= Chithira Thirunal Balarama Varma =

Last ruling Maharajah of Travancore, from 1924 to 1949

Sri Chithira Thirunal Balarama Varma
- Maharajah of Travancore; Rajpramukh of Travancore-Cochin
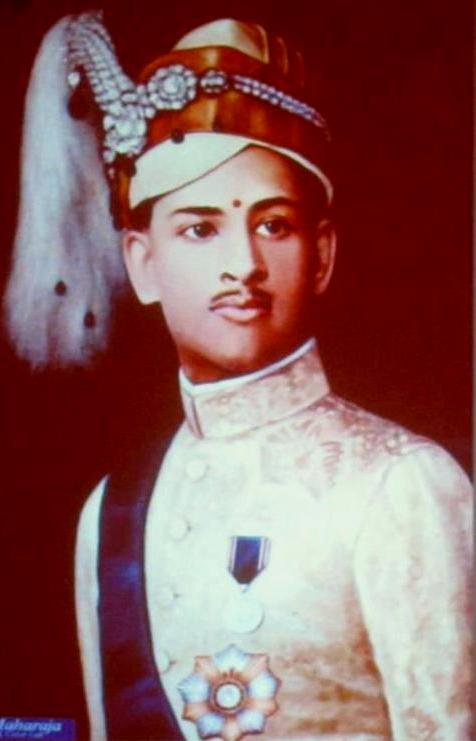
- Sree Chithira Thirunal in his courtly attire

Maharaja of Travancore
- Reign: 7 March 1924 – 1 July 1949
- Coronation: 7 August 1924
- Predecessor: Moolam Thirunal
- Regent: Pooradam Thirunal Sethu Lakshmi Bayi (1924–31)
- Successor: Monarchy abolished
- Reign: 1949–1991 (titular)
- Successor: Uthradom Thirunal Marthanda Varma (titular)
- Born: 7 November 1912; Kingdom of Travancore, British India
- Died: 20 July 1991 (aged 78); Thiruvananthapuram, Kerala, India
Names
- Sree Padmanabhadasa Vanchipala Sree Chithira Thirunal Balarama Varma
- House: Venad Swaroopam
- Father: Ravi Varma of Kilimanoor
- Mother: Amma Maharani Moolam Thirunal Sethu Parvathi Bayi

Chithira Thirunal Balarama Varma
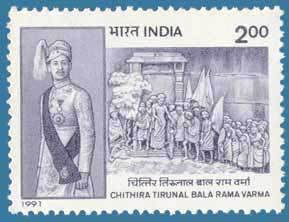
- A commemorative postage stamp on CHITHIRA TIRUNAL BALA RAMA VARMA issued by Department of Posts, Government of India on 7 November 1991.
- Country of issue: INDIA
- Date of issue: 7 November 1991
- Face value: INR 2.00

Sree Padmanabhadasa Sree Chithira Thirunal Balarama Varma GCSI GCIE, popularly known as Sree Chithira Thirunal (7 November 1912 – 20 July 1991), was the last ruling Maharaja of the Indian princely state of Travancore, in southern India until 1949 and later the Titular Maharajah of Travancore until 1991. His reign is known for several notable reforms that have had an indelible impact on the society and culture of Kerala.

Sree Chithira Thirunal was the eldest son of Junior Maharani of Travancore, Sethu Parvathi Bayi, and Sri Pooram Nal Ravi Varma Koyi Thampuran of the Royal House of Kilimanoor. He was privately educated, and became the Maharajah of Travancore, at the age of 11, upon the death of his maternal great uncle, the then Maharajah of Travancore Sree Moolam Thirunal, on 7 August 1924. For the duration of his reign he was either under a regency or effectively controlled by his autocratic Dewan, Sir C.P. Ramaswami Iyer.

Upon India's independence from the British on 15 August 1947, Sree Chithira Thirunal initially chose to keep his domain an independent country. As this was unacceptable to the Government Of India, several rounds of negotiations were held between the Maharaja and the Indian representatives. Finally an agreement was reached in 1949 and Sree Chithira Thirunal agreed to merge Travancore officially as a part of the Union of India.

In 1949, Travancore was united with Cochin, and Sree Chithira Thirunal served as the first and only Rajpramukh (Governor equivalent) of the Travancore-Cochin Union from 1 July 1949 until 31 October 1956. On 1 November 1956, the state of Kerala was created by uniting the Malayalam-speaking areas of the Travancore-Cochin Union with Malabar, and Sree Chithira Thirunal's office of Rajpramukh came to an end.

Sree Chithira Thirunal was an Hon. Major General with the British Indian Army and the Colonel-in-Chief and the Supreme Commander of the Travancore Military and of the Travancore-Cochin State Forces, for the period 1924–56. He became an Hon. Colonel in the Indian Army since 1949, as the Travancore Military was integrated by him into the former, as the 9th (1st Travancore) and the 16th Battalion of the Madras Regiment (2nd Travancore).

After the Constitutional Amendment of 1971, he was stripped of his political powers and emoluments from the privy purse by the Indira Gandhi government. At the age of 78, following a stroke, he fell into a coma for nine days and died on 20 July 1991. Along with the Sree Chitra Thirunal Institute of Medical Sciences and Technology, many other charitable trusts were established using the funds, land and buildings provided by him.

Sree Chithira Thirunal also sponsored the higher education of a young K. R. Narayanan who went on to become the 10th President of India.

== Early years ==
Maha Raja Rajya Sree Kilimanoor Pooram Nal Ravi Varma Kochu Koyi Thampuran Avergal (b.1885) – Father of Maharajah Sree Chithira Thirunal

Amma Maharani Sethu Parvathi Bayi – Mother of Maharajah Sree Chithira Thirunal

Sree Chithira Thirunal was the eldest son of Sethu Parvathi Bayi, popularly known as "Amma Maharani", the Queen Mother and Junior Maharani of Travancore, by her consort, Ravi Varma Kochu Koyi Thampuran of Royal House of Kilimanoor, a Sanskrit scholar and the great-nephew of the celebrated painter Raja Ravi Varma. He was born on Deepavali on his mother's sixteenth birthday, on 7 November 1912, as the Heir Apparent to the throne of Travancore. His siblings were Karthika Thirunal Lakshmi Bayi and Uthradom Thirunal Marthanda Varma. Sree Chithira Thirunal's mother, Sethu Parvathi Bayi, was distantly related, by birth, to the royal house of Travancore in the direct female line. In 1900, following the absence of heirs in the Travancore royal family, she had been adopted by her maternal great-aunt. According to the matrilineal traditions of the Travancore royal family, Sree Chithira Thirunal, at the time of his birth, was proclaimed the Heir Apparent of Travancore with the title of : Sree Padmanabhadasa Maharajkumar Sree Balarama Varma II, Elaya Rajah (Crown Prince) of Travancore.

=== Education ===
At the age of 6, Sree Chithira Thirunal began his education under tutors specially chosen by his uncle, Maharajah Sree Moolam Thirunal, in subjects like Malayalam, Sanskrit, Tamil, English, Mathematics, History, Geography, General Literature, Art and Culture. His early education in Malayalam and Sanskrit was imparted by the eminent scholar of the time, Attoor Krishna Pisharody and in English by Mr. Dowel I.C.S (Indian Civil Service) and T. Raman Nambeeshan. Later he had his higher education under Captain G.T.B. Harvey, and Mr Dutt I.C.S (Indian Civil Service).

At the age of 16, he began his training in State Craft and Administration, for two years, in Bangalore. Sree Chithira Thirunal lived in Bangalore until 1 July 1931, and acquired knowledge in practical administration for 15 months, under the guidance of Krishnaraja Wodeyar IV, the Maharajah of Mysore. The head tutor of Sree Chithira Thirunal, Captain. Harvey, quoted in his report to the Travancore government that : His Highness is an intelligent and willing pupil and his educational progress has been quite satisfactory. His mental equipment and the present standard of his knowledge in English, Malayalam and other subjects like Mathematics, History and Geography are higher than those laid down by the Committee ruling 'Minor Ruler's Education and Training in Administration'. His Highness continued to make very satisfactory progress in his studies and that mental progress and expansion of personality have been marked and rapid. The establishment of a separate household, has resulted in much greater self-reliance, initiative and power of decision. Opportunities for studying the laws and institutions of a progressive State have greatly broadened His Highness' experience and enlarged His Highness' sympathies and interests. By the time he reached the majority age of eighteen, Sree Chithira Thirunal, had finished his administrative training in Mysore and returned to Travancore.

== Maharajah of Travancore ==
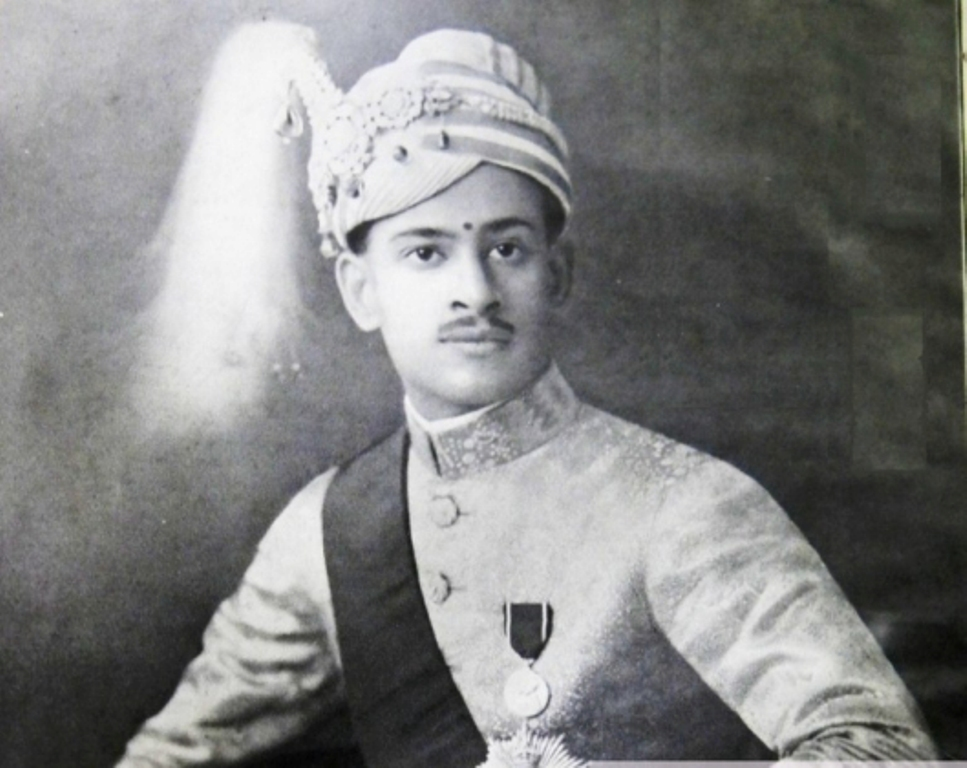
Maharaja Sree Chithira Thirunal after his investiture ceremony in 1931

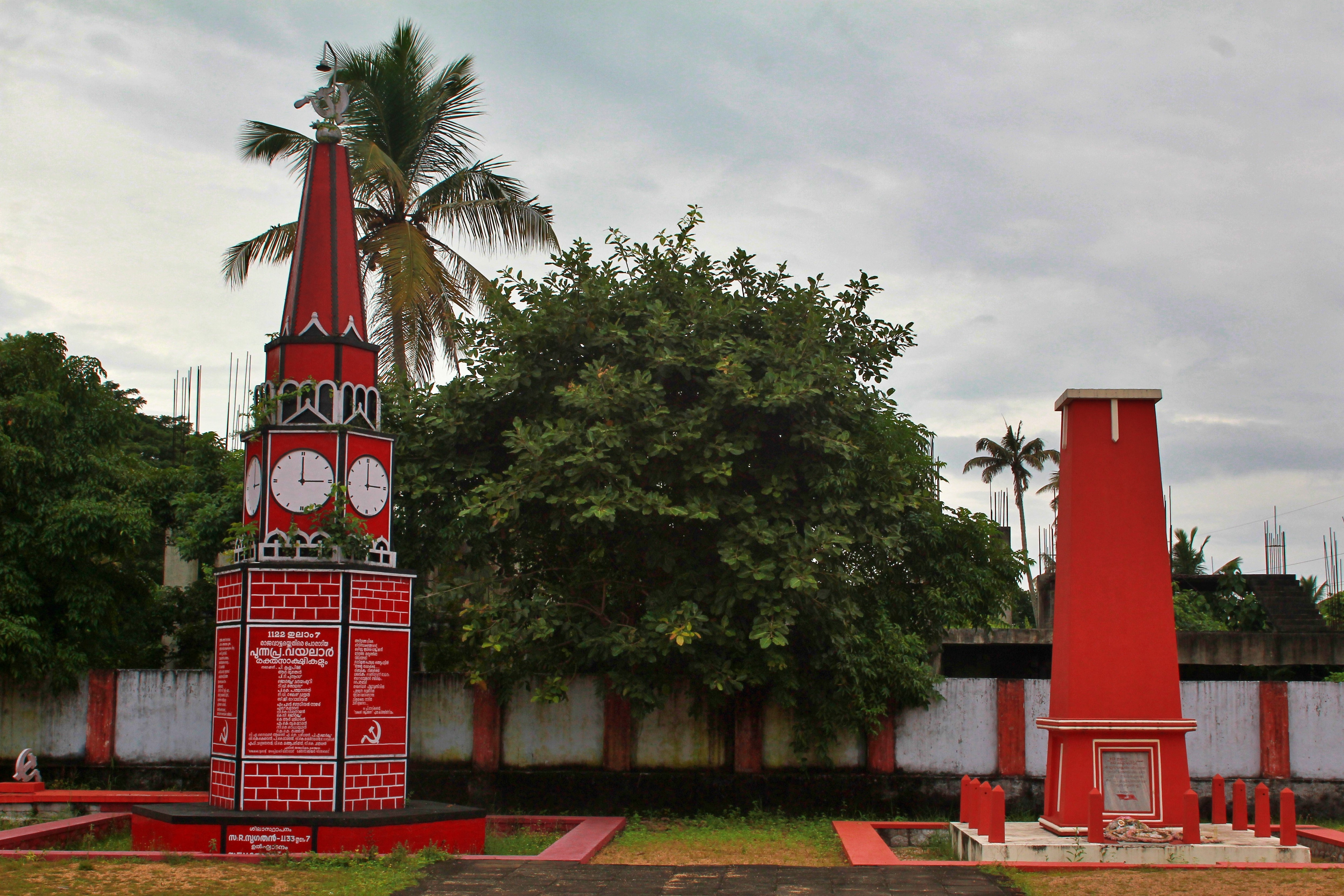
Punnapra-Vayalar Memorial

Even after turning eighteen, Sree Chithira Thirunal's investiture ceremony wasn't done and his accession to full power looked unlikely, as rumours were spread about him that he was not mentally stable and hence not qualified to occupy the throne. His mother, Maharani Sethu Parvathi Bayi, contacted Sir C. P. Ramaswamy Aiyar, a family friend, who then presented Sree Chithira Thirunal's case to the then Viceroy of India, Lord Wellington, and arranged a meeting between the two. After meeting the young monarch, the Viceroy was highly impressed and found the rumours baseless, and thus all the obstacles, in Sree Chithira Thirunal's accession to power, were removed. As Sree Chithira Thirunal was quite young, and because of the amount of controversy that had been swirling around him, Viceroy Lord Wellington insisted that Sir C.P. must become the Legal and Constitutional Adviser to the young monarch. Sree Chithira Thirunal attained full ruling powers on 6 November 1931, with the title : Major General His Highness Sree Padmanabhadasa Vanchipala Sree Chithira Thirunal Sir Balarama Varma II, Manney Sultan Maharajah Raja Ramaraja Bahadur, Shamsher Jang, Maharajah of Travancore, Knight Grand Commander of the Most Exalted Order of the Star of India, Knight Grand Commander of the Most Eminent Order of the Indian Empire. As was customary, he took the regnal name Sree Chithira Thirunal as he was born under the Chithira nakshatram or star. ln his speech, after assuming full power as the Maharajah of Travancore, he declared: "It is my hope that I shall be enabled by God's grace to earn the affection and esteem of all communities and classes amongst my people whose advancement in every department of life will be my perpetual pre-occupation and my sole aim."

All Travancore Maharajahs including Sree Moolam Thirunal conducted Hiranyagarbham ceremony. Sree Chithira Thirunal is the only Maharajah of Travancore not to have conducted Hiranyagarbham or Tulaapurushadaanam as he considered these as extremely costly ceremonies thereby making himself a Nair and not a Samantha Kshatriya.

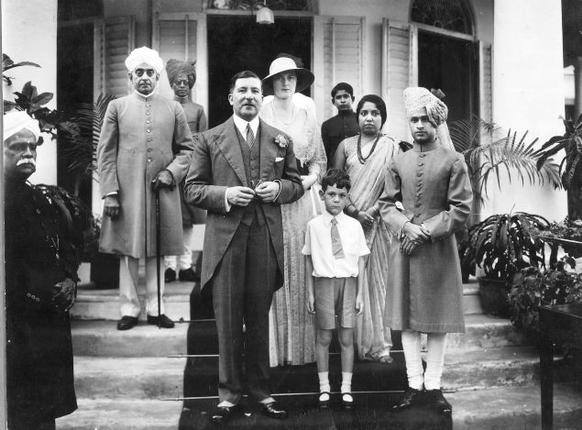
C.P.Ramaswami Aiyar

Sree Chithira Thirunal was able to secure the services of eminent statesman, Sir C.P.Ramaswami Aiyar, who initially served as his Legal and Constitutional Adviser and later as his Prime minister, for several years. Sree Chithira Thirunal went abroad, on a foreign tour, commencing on 8 April 1933 and visited England, Belgium, Germany, Switzerland and Italy etc. He had met with King George V in London and Pope Pius XI at the Vatican. Sree Chithira Thirunal also had a beautiful palace built for him named Kowdiar Palace, finished in 1934 prior to the wedding of his sister Maharani Karthika Thirunal Lakshmi Bayi to Lt. Col. G. V. Raja. It was previously an old Nalukettu, given by Maharajah Sree Moolam Thirunal to Sree Chithira Thirunal's mother, Sethu Parvathi Bayi, in 1915.

=== Bicameral assembly ===
In 1932, Sree Chithira Thirunal conducted a Constitutional Reform by forming the first Bicameral Legislature there by reducing some of his political powers. The legislative council of Travancore and Sree Moolam Popular Assembly were replaced with a formal bicameral system consisting of an Upper House—the Travancore Sree Chitra State Council, and a Lower House—the Sree Moolam Assembly. It was specified that no fewer than 55% of the members should be elected and no more than one third should be officials. In the case of the Assembly, not less than 48 members were required to be elected. Of not more than 24 nominated members, 12 should be officials. The Assembly had 72 members while the Sri Chitra State Council had 37 members. This bicameral system continued to function till September 1947, until it gave way to a constituent assembly that later led to the merger of Cochin state and the eventual joining into the Indian Union. The new bodies started functioning from 1 January 1933. The Assembly could vote on the budgetary demands for grants with powers to reduce and omit items. For the first time, a Public Accounts Committee was created making the executive increasingly accountable to the legislature. The Prime Minister (Dewan) was the President of both the Houses. The Assembly elected its own Deputy President and the term was four years.

But Ezhavas, Christians and Muslims feared the new reforms would secure for them only a few number of seats in the enlarged legislature than the Nairs. They demanded dividing the seats on the basis of population and they decided to abstain from voting and thus Abstention movement began in Travancore. The government finally acceded to protesters demand and introduced Communal Reservation on appointments in the Travancore Government Service.

=== Important regulations ===
In 1932, Sree Chithira Thirunal passed The Travancore Kshatriya Regulation (excluding Travancore royal family), for the first time, to define and amend laws related to succession, marriage & or its dissolution, property management and maintenance. The same year, the Travancore Muslim Succession Regulation was also passed to amend and define rules of succession among Muslim community. Another important bill passed in 1932 was The Jenmi-Kudiyaan Regulation. This bill proclaimed that the landlord (jenmi) will not have any right, claim or interest in the land holding except the right to receive land dues (jenmi karam). The right to review or enhance the jenmikaram rested with the government. This bill gave complete freedom for tenants (kudiyaan) over the tenant land, for the first time in history, without the interference of the landlords (janmi). It also stated that the tenant should pay the land dues to the government, to prevent exploitation and the government will then remit the dues to the land lords. Sree Chithira Thirunal also concentrated on improving the condition of women and children.

In Travancore, women were held in high respect due to the matrilineal law of inheritance, and widow remarriage was prevalent in majority of the communities. But widow remarriage was prohibited among certain communities like Vellalas, Nambuthiris, Potties, and many Brahmin communities in Travancore also. For Brahmin communities, other than Nambuthirs and potties, pre-pubescent marriage was also compulsory. So to stop the sufferings of widows and to prevent child marriages and other similar social evils and for the betterment of women, several new Bills were passed by the King: The Travancore Hindu Widows Remarriage Regulation (1938), The Travancore Child Marriage Restraint Act & The Travancore Suppression Of Immoral Traffic Act (1941), The Travancore Maternity Benefit Act (1943) etc. aimed at the betterment of women and children.

=== Educational reforms ===
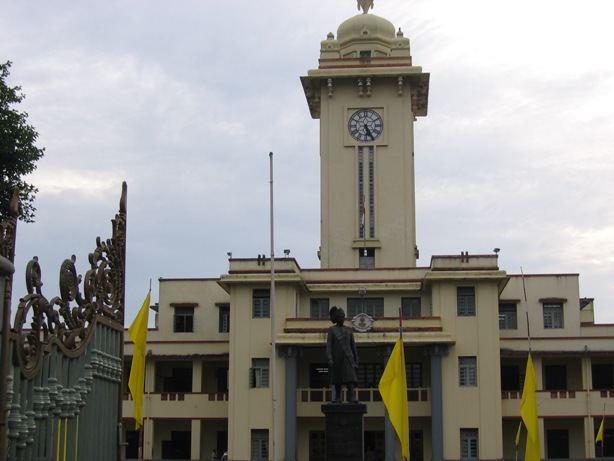
University of Travancore

Sree Chithira Thirunal established the University of Travancore (now the University of Kerala) in under The Travancore University Regulation in 1937. The need for a separate university for Travancore had been felt for long. Two committees were appointed to enquire into the question of establishing a separate university, in 1919 and 1924. After considering their recommendations, on 1 November 1937, Sree Chithira Thirunal issued the University Act. Special emphasis was given to vocational education to meet the requirements of modern conditions. The administration of the Government Colleges and the control of all the Private Colleges in the Kingdom were transferred to the university.One of the first 16 Universities in India, the University of Kerala was founded in 1937. the University of Travancore in the erstwhile princely state of Travancore(now southern part of Kerala and some neighbouring parts of state of Tamilnadu). The university came into being by a promulgation of the Maharajah of Travancore, Sri Chithira Thirunal Balarama Varma who was also the first Chancellor of the university. Sir C. P Ramaswamy Ayyar, the then Diwan (Prime minister) of the State was the first Vice-Chancellor. He was an eminent scholar and an able administrator. It is said that the Government made an unsuccessful attempt to invite Albert Einsteinto be the first Vice-Chancellor. The university was modelled after the best Universities of the United Kingdom, and even today retains some of these features. The affiliating system of the university however evolved differently from the college system in British Universities.

The earliest origins of the university may be traced back to two institutions of modern learning in Kerala – the University College Thiruvananthapuram and the Trivandrum Observatory. The University College was initially founded as the Maharaja's Free School by Maharaja Swathi Thirunal in 1834, with Mr John Roberts, a Christian Missionary as Headmaster, and soon grew into a college in 1866, affiliated to the Madras University. When the University of Travancore was founded, the departments of the college became university departments, only to switch back again when the transformation to University of Kerala happened in 1957. The University College still retains its connection with the University as an affiliated college. The Thiruvananthapuram Observatory was founded in 1838 and had an internationally reputed scientist, John Caldecott FRS as its first Director. It became a part of the Travancore University, but was administered as an independent government institution for some time. It is now the oldest institution under the Kerala University.

The Institute of Textile Technology, an engineering college and central research institute, to carry on research in Pure and Applied Sciences, were also started. A Department of Marine Biology was another significant addition. Institutions like the Observatory, the Public Library and the School of Arts were also placed under the university. He also formed a new form of University Training Corps, viz. Labour Corps, preceding the N C C, in the educational institutions. The expenses of the university were to be met fully by the government. The College of Engineering, Medical College Hospital at Ulloor, Trivandrum's SAT hospital were created at Sree Chithira Thirunal's behest. The Travancore Primary Education Act, by which Sree Chithira Thirunal introduced Free, Universal and Compulsory Education irrespective of caste, gender etc. The Act also prohibited child labour and also prohibited religious instruction in schools, thus making education completely secular.

=== Industrial and infrastructure development ===
According to historian, A. Sreedhara Menon, Sree Chithira Thirunal also initiated industrialization and increased the role of the public sector in Travancore. He introduced heavy industry in the State and established giant public sector undertakings. As many as twenty industries were established, mostly for using the local raw materials such as rubber, ceramics and minerals. A majority of the premier industries running in Kerala even today were established by Sree Chithira Thirunal. Travancore Rubber Works, Kundara Ceramics, Fertilisers and Chemicals Travancore (FACT), Travancore Titanium Products Ltd, Travancore-Cochin Chemicals, Punalur Paper Mills etc. are some of the industries started by him. Historian A. Sreedhara Menon referred to the administration of Sree Chithira Thirunal as 'enlightened' as his reign saw remarkable progress in the fields of education, economy, defence & society as a whole.

Thiruvananthapuram International Airport. The airport was established 1932 as part of the Royal Flying Club under the initiative of Lt. Col. Goda Varma Raja, husband of Karthika Thirunal Lakshmi Bayi, the Rani of Attingal and Travancore Kingdom. Goda Varma Raja, a trained pilot, felt the need for an airport to accommodate Travancore in the aviation map of India and requested the Travancore Durbar to initiate the process of establishing an aerodrome. A detailed report was made and presented to the King by Consort Prince in this regard. It may be mentioned that the King was the brother of Lt. Col. Raja's wife, and the colonel's children were the heirs to the throne.[citation needed]

In 1935, on the royal patronage of Maharaja Chithira Thirunal Balarama Varma, Tata Airlines made its maiden flight to the airport using an DH.83 Fox Moth aircraft under command of pilot Nevill Vintcent carrying Jamshed Navoroji, a Tata company official, and Kanchi Dwarakadas, commercial agent of Travancore in Karachi, with a special mail from the Viceroy of British India, Lord Willingdon, wishing birthday greetings to the Maharaja.[9]

The first flight took off on 1 November 1935, carrying mails of Royal Anchal (Travancore Post) to Bombay. In 1938, the Royal Government of Travancore acquired a Dakota as the Maharaja's private aircraft and placed the first squadron of the Royal Indian Air Force (Travancore) for protection of the state from aerial attacks. After Independence, the airstrip was used for domestic flights with the construction of a new domestic terminal, Terminal 1.[citation needed]

Public Transport Department (renamed Kerala State Road Transport Corporation)The Travancore government, headed by King Chithira Thirunal Balarama Varma, decided to establish the Travancore State Transport Department (TSTD) the predecessor of KSRTC, to improve the existing public-transport system.Initially, the department imported 60 Commer PNF3 chassis from England. Under the supervision of E.G Salter, the then Assistant Operating Superintendent of London Passenger Transport Board, the imported chassis were fitted with Perkins Lynx diesel engines. The bus bodies were built by department staff, and Travancore Dewan C. P. Ramaswami Iyer insisted on using local wood. The body shop (supervised by Salter) was originally in Chakai, and was later moved to Pappanamcode. Salter's experimental body design became standard on the rest of the buses.

Most of the private operators on the Thiruvananthapuram-Kanyakumari route had to close when the roads were nationalized, and many experienced drivers, conductors, and inspectors lost their jobs. TSTD recruited them, and Salter selected 60 people out of 81 applicants. Nearly one hundred applicants with bachelor's degrees were employed as inspectors and conductors.

The state road-transport service was inaugurated on 20 February 1938 by Maharaja Sree Chithira Thirunal, who (with his family, Col. Goda Varma Raja, and other dignitaries) rode the first bus on the Main Road to Kowdiar Square; Salter drove the bus. A fleet of 33 buses and a large crowd joined in the celebration. On 21 February 1938, the first bus operated from Thiruvananthapuram to Kanyakumari.

The early buses had 23 leather seats. Entry was through the rear, and the buses had a centre aisle. Ten first-class seats were in the front. Schedules, fares and stops were published, and a parcel service began in which goods could be delivered by designated agents. Conductors wore khaki with a white topi, and inspectors wore khaki. Conductors had machines to issue tickets. Later buses were manufactured by Dodge, Fargo, Bedford, and Chevrolet.

The TSTD operated on three routes: Thiruvananthapuram-Nagercoil, Nagercoil-Kanyakumari, and Nagercoil-Colachel. Regular service began on 21 February 1938 with 39 buses. The minimum fare for one mile was one-half chakram The next fare was one chakram, and first-class tickets were 50 percent more. Children under age three travelled free, and those between three and 14 paid half the fare. Luggage under 28 pounds (13 kg) was free; 28–56 pounds (13–25 kg) was four chakrams, and 56–112 pounds (25–51 kg) was six chakrams.The Motor Vehicle Act was passed in 1939. Bus service was extended to Kochi in 1949, and to the Malabar region in 1956.

Pallivasal Hydro-electric project Kundara had abundant reserves of China-clay the key raw material for Ceramic and Porcelain. In 1937 during reign of Chithira Thirunal Balarama Varma the clay processing industry was started in Kundara. In the 1960s this developed into The Kerala Ceramics Limited.[11]

The backbone of modern industrialisation of Kundara was setting up of a 66kV Electrical substation at Kundara on 3 May 1940 which complemented the Pallivasal project, the first hydroelectric project in Kerala.[12] This was part of the network of first eight substations established in Travancorebetween Thrissur and Trivandrum to transmit hydroelectricity generated to households towns and industries. The Kundara substation was later upgraded to 220kV capacity and today it is vital in providing electricity to Kollam City and Kollam–Thiruvananthapuram trunk line of Southern Railways.

The power of availability of cheap hydroelectricity in Kundara then was such that, it prompted the famous Nobel Laureate, C. V. Raman and his close associate, P. Krishnamurti to set up the first ever unit of their newly formed company, Travancore Chemical & Manufacturing Company Ltd (TCM Ltd) at Kundara in 1943.[13] The unit produced Potassium chlorate an ingredient used in Safety match.[14] This unit once existed near Elampalloor Masjid on present day NH 183 and today it no longer exist

The setting up of substation also helped start Aluminium Industry in Kundara. On the invitation of C. P. Ramaswami Iyer the Diwan of travancore, on 2 January 1946, Seshasayee Brothers Group of Madras started the famous ALIND, Kundara.[15] The company was pioneers in aluminium electrical cable manufacturing in the region and has manufactured cables more than 10 million km in length. The company slipped into crisis in the late 1980s due to labour issues and poor management.was begun by him. 12 September

1945 as Travancore State Bank Ltd. later known as STATE BANK OF TRAVANCORE (SBT). SBT was established in 1945 as the Travancore Bank Ltd., at the initiative of Travancore Diwan C. P. Ramaswami Iyer under the guidance of Chithira Thirunal Balarama Varma.

Instead, the bank considered the Maharaja of Travancore Sri Chithira Thirunal Balarama Varma as the founder. Although the Travancore government put up only 25% of the capital, the bank undertook government treasury work and foreign exchange business, apart from its general banking business. Its head office was at Thiruvananthapuram.

In 1960, it became a subsidiary of State Bank of India under the SBI Subsidiary Banks Act, 1959, enacted by the Parliament of India, and thus achieved the name 'State Bank of Travancore'.

=== Art, sports and culture ===
Sree Chithira Thirunal patronized musicians, artists, dancers and Vedic scholars. He appointed, for the first time, an Art Advisor to Government, Dr. J. H. Cousins. He also inaugurated an art gallery named Sree Chitra Art Gallery, features a unique collection of traditional and contemporary paintings, including the works of Raja Ravi Varma, Nicholas Roerich, Svetoslav Roerich, Jamini Roy, Rabindranath Tagore, V. S. Valiathan, C. Raja Raja Varma, and K. C. S. Paniker. Sree Chithira Thirunal also started efforts to popularize Carnatic Music, especially the works of his ancestor & Maharaja Swathi Thirunal Rama Varma. He assigned musicians Muthiah Bhagavathar and Semmangudi Srinivasa Iyer for this task. In 1939, Sree Chithira Thirunal started Sri Swathi Thirunal Music Academy (renamed as Sree Swathi Thirunal College of Music in 1962) with the primary objective of popularizing the Maharajah Sree Swathi Thirunal kritits (compositions). Nellikkampatty Game Sanctuary (renamed Periyar National Park and Wildlife Sanctuary (PNP)) was also created under his instructions. Sree Chithira Thirunal supported the vision and untiring works of his brother-in-law, Lt. Col. G. V. Raja, in the fields of Sports and Tourism. Lt. Col. G. V. Raja was synonymous with the establishment of Royal Flying Club, renamed Thiruvananthapuram International Airport and development of tourism in Travancore as well as Kerala. However, The Travancore Dramatic Performances Act in 1939 is considered by researchers as an attack on freedom of expression, as it prohibited materials that criticized the British Emperor or the government.

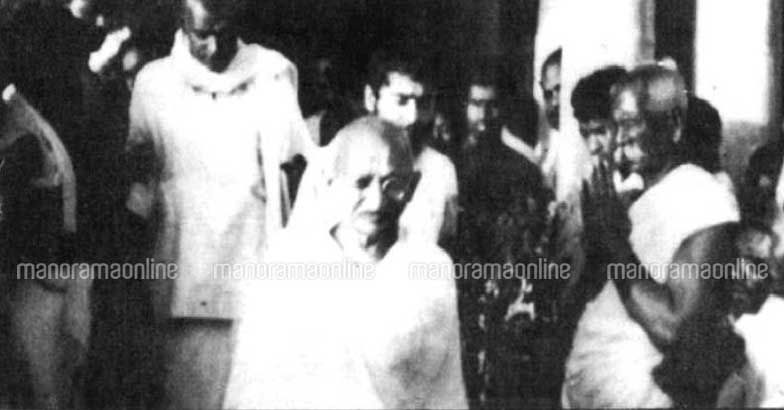
Vaikom Satyagraha

=== Banning of untouchability and Temple Entry Proclamation ===
During and immediately after the Vaikom Satyagraha, the general public started to support the temple entry movement in Kerala and due to the participation of Mahatma Gandhi, it got all India level importance as well. The Travancore Government, under the reign of Maharajah Sree Chithira Thirunal, decided to appoint a Temple Entry Enquiry Committee. The committee was formed on 25 November 1932 as per the order of the Maharajah. The committee was required to report on the subject of Temple Entry for the Dalits, and appointed V.S. Subramania Aiyar as its president. But the Committee took a negative stance against Temple Entry and advised against the temple entry citing the possibility of civil disorder from the part of the upper castes.

The committee made the following observations regarding the temple entry:

If temple entry is allowed, one result apprehended is that the opposition from a fairly large section of Savarnas (upper castes) is likely to lead to breaches of the peace. But the Government should be able to take the necessary precautionary measures. Any change in the matter of temple entry could be made only with the advice and concurrence of Vaidiks (Brahmin priests), Vadhyans (Hindu religious teachers), Thantris and the Azhvanchery Thamprakkal and men learned in the religion and conversant with present day world movements.

— quote

The committee also suggested certain methods to the government by which the rigour of the custom, that excluded the Dalits from the temple, might be softened. The Committee stated that Hindu community is bound to take immediate and adequate measures for the upliftment of the Dalits, socially and economically, and it should be done independently of the question of temple entry.

The committee suggested for this following steps for the upliftment of Dalits:

- Theendal (distance of pollution) should be removed by appropriate legislative measures, subject to reservations in the matter of entry into temples and into their adjuncts like temple-tanks, temple-wells, Homapura (places where prayer rituals were conducted), Anakottils (places where elephants are cared for) etc.
- Public tanks used for bathing purposes should be thrown open, after separate cisterns are attached to them or portions of them are walled off, where people could wash their clothes, etc. before getting into the tanks for bath.
- Public wells should be thrown open, after they are provided with cisterns, in which water should be stored from the wells by Municipal or Health Department employees, and from which water should be drained through taps.
- Government inns should be thrown open, after they are provided with separate kitchens, as in the case of such as are already open to all classes.

The above four observations were immediately put into action by the government and thus all restrictions on the usage of public amenities, like roads, wells, tanks etc. by the Dalits, were removed. The practice of theendal (distance of pollution) or untouchability was immediately banned.

- Arrangements should be made for providing Bhajanamadoms (prayer centres), instituting religious lectures, opening schools for adult instruction, and having proper housing and sanitation and the adequate supply of wells and tanks for such Avarna Communities as in the opinion of Government require such assistance. This item may be so worked as to be completed in a definite period, say, ten years.
- "In important centres, temples may be built and consecrated, where Savarnas (upper castes) and Avarnas may worship together, such savarnas retaining their full rights of worship etc., in temples where Avarnas are not now admitted."

According to Mahatma Gandhi University researchers, the report made by the Temple Entry Enquiry Committee was not relevant and became useless as it could not make satisfactory recommendations in the matter of temple entry for which it was primarily formed. After the submission of the Committee Report, people were not much interested in the temple entry movement in Travancore. But the temple entry question was discussed occasionally in Travancore without any serious organised attempts. Based on the research provided on Shodganga site, the efforts of "Kerala Harijan Sevak Sangh" played a big part in bringing the attention of the people, back to the cause. On 22 March 1936, at the annual meeting of Kerala Harijan Sevak Sangh, held at Trivandrum, a Temple Entry Committee was appointed for starting temple entry agitation in Kerala. By the decision of the Temple Entry Committee, several temple entry conferences were held at the capitals of Harijan Sevak Sangh in Kerala. After the conference, volunteers marched at various places to focus the attention of people in the matter of temple entry. In Travancore, though holding processions were prohibited at the time, they were permitted to conduct it by the government. Kerala Harijan Sevak Sangh also managed to gather the support of upper castes for the temple entry question and observed 19 April 1936 as the "Temple Entry Day" in Kerala. About 55,000 signatures of upper castes in Travancore were collected by their efforts. The Kerala State Temple Entry Conference held at Trivandrum on Mary 9th and 10th, presided by Srimathi Rameshwari Nehru, gathered more force and voice to the temple entry agitation. The resolution of temple entry, on equal status to all Hindus introduced by K. Kelappan, was unanimously passed in that conference. A team was also created in the Conference to introduce matter of the temple entry before Maharajah Sree Chithira Thirunal. Srimathi Rameshwari Nehru made a two weeks tour throughout Kerala and achieved public support for the temple entry movement. The study done by Mahatma Gandhi University researchers, published in the website, Shodhganga, has pointed out that, Sree Chithira Thirunal was indeed in full favour of a proper temple entry even when, the Maharajah of Cochin and British Malabar's Zamorin, opposed it vigorously. G. D. Birla, the then President of "All India Harijan Sevak Sangh" had an audience with the Maharajah and did an interview with him in the third week of June 1936, which is mentioned in the research paper, "TEMPLE ENTRY FREEDOM IN KERALA". The interview with Maharajah revealed that he indeed had favourable attitude towards the temple entry for Dalits. A. V. Thackar, the Secretary of All India Harijan Sevak Sangh, in his speech at Calicut on 6 November 1936 too said that the Maharajah of Travancore may be taking the decision about the matter on the next birth day of Maharajah on 12 November, same year. The team from Kerala State Temple Entry Conference also met the then Prime Minister of Travancore, Sir C. P. Ramaswamy Aiyer and handed over the memorial for submitting it to the Maharajah.

The historians also point out the fact that both the immediate predecessors of Sree Chithira Thirunal, i.e., Maharajah Moolam Thirunal as well as Regent Maharani Sethu Lakshmi Bayi, were against temple entry for Dalits. The Vaikom Satyagraha leaders and volunteers were arrested and imprisoned on a large scale, during the reign of Moolam Thirunal. During the Regency of Maharani Sethu Lakshmi Bayi those imprisoned were released and at the request of Mahatma Gandhi, she opened the west, south & north public roads to Vaikom Mahadeva Temple to all castes. But she refused to open the eastern road to the same temple as it was used by Brahmins and also refused to give temple entry for all castes. For this, she was criticized by the likes of Mannathu Padmanabhan who accused that the Regent Maharani was under the influence of Tamil Brahmins, and her excuse that as the Regent she had no power to decide, was a lie. He retorted that she had complete power to give temple entry but she simply refused to do the same. This was further proved when Mahatma Gandhi, during a visit to Travancore, posed the question of temple entry to Regent Maharani Sethu Lakshmi Bayi. She glossed over the question by saying that, it was wrong and most unfortunate but she had no power to do so as she was just a 'Regent' for her then minor nephew, Maharajah Sree Chithira Thirunal and that Gandhi should the pose the question to him. A frustrated Gandhi repeated the question to the boy Maharajah. But much to the embarrassment of Regent Maharani Sethu Lakshmi Bayi, the 12-year-old Sree Chithira Thirunal, readily and without any consultation, promised Gandhi that he would allow temple entry during his reign. This incident was later quoted by Dr. K. R. Narayanan, the former President of India, in his speech referring to the progressive mind of Sree Chithira Thirunal even as a young boy.

With an outlook which no previous Indian ruler had been able to entertain for thousands of years, Sree Chithira Thirunal signed the Proclamation. On 12 November 1936, the Travancore Government published an extra-Ordinary Gazette which contained the Temple Entry Proclamation. Thus the Proclamation, issued by Maharajah Chithira Thirunal Balarama Varma, finally abolished the ban on Dalits from entering Hindu temples in Travancore (now part of Kerala, India) and also ended the cruel practice of untouchability. Historians and sociologists consider the proclamation as a milestone in the history of Travancore as well as the rest of Kerala. It was published on the eve of Sree Chithira Thirunal's birthday in 1112 (1936 A.D.). The Proclamation was received throughout India with delight and admiration.

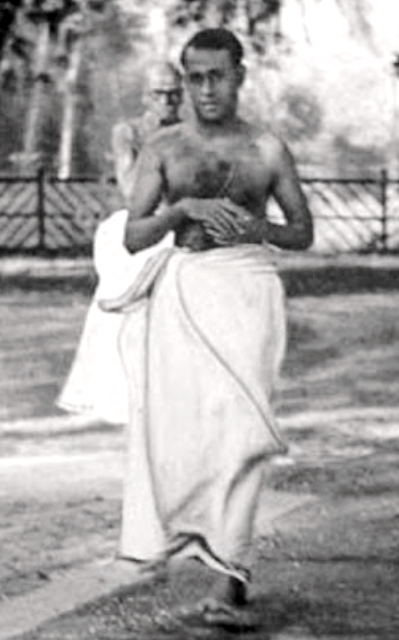
H. H. Maharajah Sree Padmanabhadasa Sree Chithira Thirunal on his way to Padmanabhaswamy Temple

The full edict of Temple Entry Proclamtion by His Highness Sree Padamanabhadasa Vanchipaala Sir Rama Varma Chithira Thirunal Kulasekhara Kireetapathi Manney Sulthan Maharajah Ramarajabahadur Shemsherjung, KNIGHT GRAND COMMANDER OF THE MOST EMINENT ORDER OF THE INDIAN EMPIRE Maharajah of Travancore, as follows:

"Profoundly convinced of the truth and validity of our religion, believing that it is based on divine guidance and on all-comprehending toleration, knowing that in its practice it has throughout the centuries, adapted itself to the needs of changing times, solicitous that none of our Hindu subjects should, by reason of birth or caste or community, be denied the consolation and the solace of the Hindu faith, we have decided and hereby declare, ordain and command that, subject to such rules and conditions as may be laid down and imposed by us for preserving their proper atmosphere and maintaining their rituals and observances, there should henceforth be no restriction placed on any Hindu by birth or religion on entering or worshipping at temples controlled by us and our Government."

Thus, Travancore achieved equal temple entry freedom of worship to all classes of Hindus in 1930s itself. The Proclamation was the first of its kind in Princely States as well as in British India. Even though there were agitations in various parts of India as well as rest of Kerala for temple entry, none managed to achieve their aim. The Travancore Temple Entry Proclamation could not make any serious effects in Cochin or British Malabar. The attitude of the Zamorin and the Maharajah of Cochin was not favourable towards it. Neither Zamorin nor the Maharajah of Cochin had any wishes to change the existing customs and usages in temples. According to historians, in such a context, the proclamation has far more importance, and through it, Travancore achieved the popularity as an enlightened progressive Princely State.

Sir C. P. Ramaswami Aiyer, the then Prime Minister of Travancore credited the Proclamation to the conviction of the young Maharajah and said:

The Proclamation is a unique occasion in the history of India and specially of Hinduism. It fell to the lot of His Highness, not as a result of agitation, although some people have claimed to result as due to agitation, but Suo moto and of his own free will, to have made it possible for every Hindu subject to enter the historic temples of this land of faith and bend in adoration before the Supreme. Such an act required may minority vision and usage amidst difficulties and handicaps. when it is remembered that this decision was a purely voluntary act, on the part of sovereign, solicitous for the welfare of this subjects and was not the result of any immediate pressure, the greatness of the achievement becomes even more apparent. This action broke the calamity of Hindu religion and helped to strengthen the Hindus.

— quote

The Prime Minister of Madras described the Proclamation as the greatest religious reform in India after the time of Asoka termed Sree Chithira Thirunal as the Modern Asoka of India.

Mahatma Gandhi in an open letter, addressed to Sree Chithira Thirunal, wrote:

People call me "The Mahatma" and I don't think I deserve it. But in my view, you have in reality become a "Mahatma" (great soul) by your proclamation at this young age, breaking the age old custom and throwing open the doors of the Temples to our brothers and sisters whom the hateful tradition considered as untouchables. I verily believe that when all else is forgotten, this one act of the Maharajah- the Proclamation- will be remembered by future generation with gratitude and hope that all other Hindu Princes will follow the noble example set by this far-off ancient Hindu State.

— quote

The researchers believe that it was Sir C. P. Ramaswami Aiyar's legal skill that ironed out all the practical difficulties, posed by the orthodox section, before the Proclamation. He foresaw all the objections that could be raised against Temple Entry and dealt with them one by one. He was also able to ensure that the actual declaration was known beforehand to only very few people. To the people of Travancore, it came as a momentous announcement. The Universities of Andhra and Annamalai conferred D.Litts on the Maharajah. A life size statue of Sree Chithira Thirunal was erected in Trivandrum as well as Madras by the citizens there which were unveiled by the Rajah of Bilkanir and Lord Erstine, the then Governor of Madras, respectively.

=== Political unrest ===
Despite all the development and prosperity attained by his reign, Sree Chithira Thirunal's ruling period saw severe political unrest due to the then ongoing Indian freedom struggle. The Haripura Session of the Indian National Congress February 1938 resolved that in the Princely States by independent organisations may be encouraged to carry on internal struggles in these states. Gandhi's view was that the demand made by the people of princely states for responsible government was just and proper added fuel to their works. Thus, the Travancore State Congress with Pattom Thanu Pillai, a lawyer and public figure of Travancore as its first president. The Travancore State Congress started an active campaign for the creation of responsible government in Travancore. Sir C. P. tried every possible measure to curb the congress activities but the party had become one of the major critics of Prime Minister (Diwan), Sir C. P. Ramaswamy Aiyar. Meetings and demonstrations were banned and A. Narayana Pillai was arrested on a charge of sedition. According to Shodhganga website, "the Dewan soon started a reign of terror to suppress the State Congress." The State Congress presented a memorandum to Sree Chithira Thirunal making him aware of the immediate need for the grant of responsible government and also bringing to his notice the repressive policies of his Prime Minister's administration. Sir C. P. retaliated by declaring State Congress and its ally 'All Travancore Youth League' as disloyal and subversive bodies. The Diwan cancelled the licences of news papers, Malayala Manorama and Kerala Kaumudi which published news relating to the activities of the State Congress. On 26 August 1938, the State Congress started a widespread Civil Disobedience Movement but leaders like Pattom Thanu Pillai and T. M. Varghese were arrested in Trivandrum. Then the congress organized a massive rally under the leadership of Akkamma Cherian on the birthday of the Maharaja on 12 November 1938. After understanding the seriousness of the situation, Sree Chithira Thirunal announced the withdrawal of the ban on the State Congress and the unconditional release of its leaders. But Sir C. P. put forward the condition of withdrawing the earlier memorandum which contained personal allegations against him which the Youth League opposed and left the Congress and strengthened the ranks of the Youth League whereas some formed radical group with Communist leanings and K. Krishna Pillai as its leader. The radical wing of the Youth League, consisting of the Communists, had decided to cooperate with the government in its war efforts following the entry of the USSR in the Second World War. But after the war, the Communist staged a violent protest against Sir C. p. which came to known as the much disputed Punnapra-Vayalar uprising. What ever be the aim or motive of the Communists for conducting Punnapra-Vayalar uprising, the government action which led to the death of hundreds of Communist Party workers, marred the otherwise progressive reign of Sree Chithira Thirunal. The image of Sir C. P. was destroyed irreparably, and has been since cast into the light of a 'villain' by the entire political class in Kerala. The State Congress' long struggle for a responsible government finally became a reality in 1948 when Sree Chithira Thirunal announced the first public election in Travancore.

=== Accession of Travancore to India ===
On 3 June 1947, British announced the date of their withdrawal from India & creation of two dominions. The Indian Independence Act 1947 provided that the suzerainty of the British Crown over the princely states would simply be terminated, with effect from 15 August 1947, that would leave the princely states completely independent. After British India became independent as two dominions in 1947, British Suzerainty was lifted from Travancore and in essence Travancore became Independent. The Instrument of Accession was a legal document created in 1947 to enable each of the rulers of the princely states under British suzerainty to join one of the new dominions of India or Pakistan created by the Partition of British India. Thus on 11 July, the Travancore Prime Minister, Sir C. P. Ramaswamy Aiyar announced, at the behest of Sree Chithira Thirunal, that the Kingdom of Travancore will neither join India nor Pakistan but will remain an Independent Country. This led to protests in Travancore mainly from Congress and other political parties who feared that it only sought to perpetuate the autocratic rule of the then Diwan. Family sources indicate that Sir C. P., himself, was not in favour of independence but only greater autonomy and that a favourable agreement had been reached between Sir C. P. and the Indian representatives by 23 July 1947 and accession to the Indian Union could not be carried out only because it was pending approval by the Maharajah. Nevertheless, an assassination attempt was made on Sir C. P. by a Brahmin youth named K.C.S. Mani on 25 July 1947 during a concert commemorating the anniversary of Maharaja Swathi Thirunal.

As Sree Chithira Thirunal's decision to keep Travancore independent of India was unacceptable to the Indian government, several rounds of negotiations were held between the Maharaja and the Indian representatives. After holding discussions with Mountbatten, Sree Chithira Thirunal agreed to enter into a Stand-still Agreement with the Indian Union on 10 August 1947. And according to the Stand-still Agreement, Travancore's domestic sovereignty will be accepted by the Indian government even though foreign policy & defence will be in Indian government's hand. But Travancore could indulge in foreign trade without India's permission; also that there won't be any interference in internal matters of Travancore by the Indian govt. But Louis Mountbatten withdrew all his assurances regarding maintaining Travancore's sovereignty and another round of discussion started between Sree Chithira Thirunal and Indian representative, V. P. Menon. In 1948, Sree Chithira Thirunal announced first public election in Travancore to create responsible government with the Maharaja as the Constitutional Head of State.

At the same time, negotiation with the Indian union was ongoing and finally Sree Chithira Thirunal agreed to accede his state to the new Dominion of India in 1949. The neighbouring Cochin state was united with the Kingdom of Travancore. According to V. P. Menon, Sree Chithira Thirunal came close to refusing the post of Rajpramukh because he could not give oath to the Indian government as he had already taken the oath in front of his family deity Sree Padmanabha. He stated that he "would rather abdicate his position and stand down for the welfare of his people." Sree Chithira Thirunal's conditions were accepted by the Indian representatives and V. P. Menon, the chief Indian negotiator, put forward the suggestion that as Sree Chithira Thirunal was unwilling to take the oath, he should write a letter to the Indian government assuring them his full co-operation and commitment to the post of Rajpramukh. Thus Sree Chithira Thirunal became the Rajpramukh of the newly created United States of Travancore-Cochin and his ancient Travancore Kingdom merged into the Union of India. He was an Hon. Major General with the British Indian Army and the Colonel-in-Chief and the Supreme Commander of the Travancore Army and of the Travancore-Cochin State Forces for the period 1949–54. He became an Hon. Colonel in the Indian Army as the Travancore Army was integrated by him into the former, after 1949, as the 9th (1st Travancore) and the 16th Battalion of the Madras Regiment (2nd Travancore).

== Rajpramukh of the United State of Travancore-Cochin ==
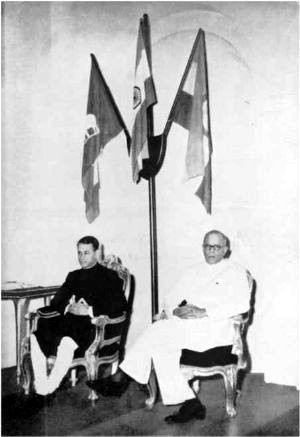
The Maharajah with V. P. Menon inaugurating the Travancore-Cochin Union

Following the national policy of integration, the State of Kochi and Travancore were merged into Travancore-Cochin State under a Rajpramukh. The rulers of Travancore and Cochin had entered into a Covenant to unite their States into one, with a common Executive, Legislature and Judiciary. The new entity was named the "United State of Travancore and Cochin", better known as "Thiru-Kochi" inaugurated on 1 July 1949. Sree Chithira Thirunal became the Rajpramukh, Governor equivalent, of the newly formed United State. A Council of Ministers was to advise him in the exercise of his functions. They were to comply with the directions of the Government of India. Questions of disputed succession in regard to the State were to be decided by the Rajpramukh after referring it to the High Court of the United State and in accordance with the opinion of the latter.

According to Article XI of the Covenant, Rajpramukh Sree Chithira Thirunal promulgated an ordinance which declared that the laws existing in the two states should continue to be in force in their respective territories and the courts, both civil and criminal. They would continue to enjoy their existing jurisdiction and powers conferred on them. The courts were to eliminate conflicts arising from the application of laws by interpretation. Another Ordinance led to the creation of the High Court of the United State of Travancore-Cochin. Sree Chithira Thirunal was empowered to appoint the Chief Justice and other judges of the High Court whose number was fixed at not less than five. The Ordinance prescribed the powers and jurisdiction of the High Court including the superintendence over all subordinate courts. All appeals pending before the High Courts of Travancore and Cochin were to be heard by the High Court of the United State. The seat of the new High Court was decided to be at Ernakulam. Sree Chithira Thirunal had already executed an "Instrument of Accession" under section 6 of the Government of India Act, 1935, thereby accepting the supremacy of Dominion Legislature. He served as the first and only Rajpramukh of the Travancore-Cochin Union from 1 July 1949 to 31 October 1956, which was the entire duration of the existence of that political entity.

The movement for a united (Aikya) Kerala gathered momentum with the attainment of independence. The first concrete step in this direction was taken on 1 July 1949. The next step came with the reorganization of States on a linguistic basis in the light of the report of the States Reorganization Commission. It was decided to add Malabar district and the Kasargod taluk of south Canara district to Travancore-Kochi and to separate the Tamil-speaking southern region of old Travancore from Travancore-Kochi for inclusion in Madras State. On 1 November 1956, the state of Kerala was created by uniting the Malayalam-speaking areas of the Travancore-Cochin Union with those of neighbouring Madras State, and Sree Chithira Thirunal's office of Rajpramukh came to an end. Thus, after a hectic public life of 25 years, Maharajah Sree Chithira Thirunal Balarama Varma retired from active public service in 1956.

== Criticism and allegations ==
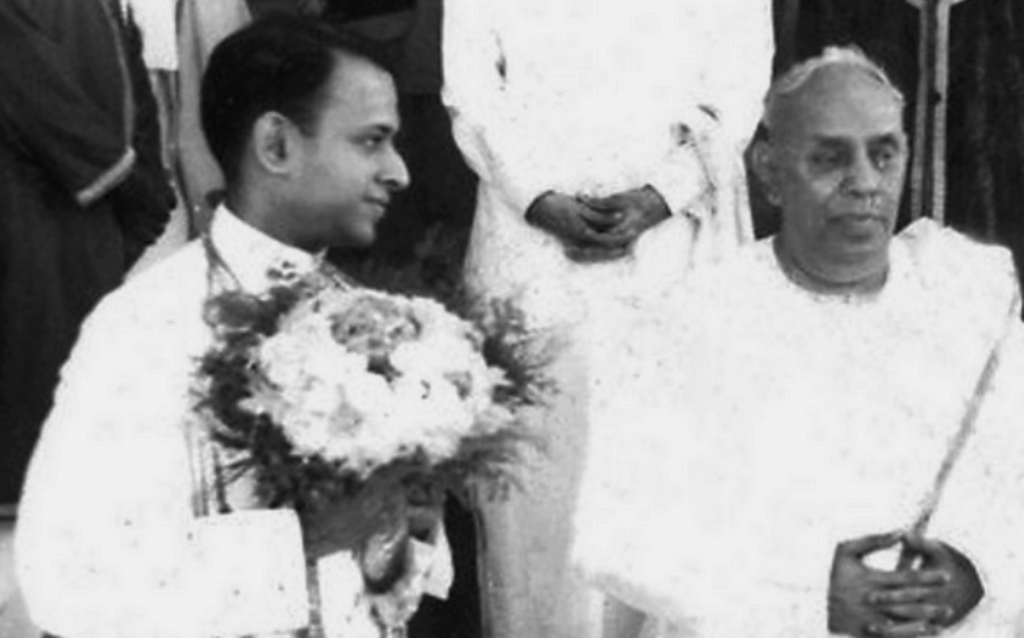
Maharajah Sree Chithira Thirunal Balarama Varma with the Cochin Maharaja

V. P. Menon, the chief Indian negotiator, alleged in his book that, Sree Chithira Thirunal was against the prospect of the Maharajah of Cochin becoming Uprajpramukh, as both Travancore and Cochin Kingdoms had a long-standing rivalry from early times itself; Cochin used to be a tributary of Travancore before the arrival of the British. Also when Sree Chithira Thirunal did the Temple Entry Proclamation in Travancore, allowing untouchables to enter all Travancore Hindu temples, the ruler of Cochin refused to accept it. This caused a further strain in their already shaky relationship.

Lakshmi Raghunanadan (a granddaughter of Senior Maharani Sethu Lakshmi Bayi) alleged that Sree Chithira Thirunal initiated a move to overtake her grandmother's summer estate at Peermade in 1938 which however did not happen due to the intervention of the then British Resident of Travancore. A division of royal properties and estates were done, after the cancellation of Privy Purse by the Indian government, in 1971. The properties were divided between the branch of Sethu Lakshmi Bayi and Sethu Parvathi Bayi, the Senior and Junior Maharanis of Travancore. The terms of division of properties was accepted by all members of both branches. But later Revathi Thirunal Balagopal Varma, (the grandson of Senior Queen Sethu Lakshmi Bayi) who at the time of property division was a minor, accused that Sree Chithira Thirunal had taken away a property, Poojappura Satelmond Palace, that rightly belonged to his grandmother, the Senior Maharani. Sree Chithira Thirunal had given away this Palace to the Government of Kerala to construct a new Medical Centre, the now famous, Sree Chitra Thirunal Institute of Medical Sciences and Technology, in 1974. Revathi Thirunal Balagopal Varma also accused Chithira Thirunal of unlawfully taking away the traditional holdings of Sethu Lakshmi Bayi as Senior Rani of Attingal. Her case was presented to the then Viceroy of India in the 1930s but was dismissed by him, as former Travancore Maharaja Marthanda Varma had already removed all the powers of Attingal Queens in the 18th century itself.

Revathi Thirunal Balagopal Varma took his grievance first to the High Court of Kerala and later to the Supreme Court of India. However, at both courts, the verdicts came in favour of Sree Chithira Thirunal and the appellant Revathi Thirunal's case was dismissed in the final judgement of 1991 by the Supreme Court of India.

== Later years ==
After retiring from active public life in 1956, Sree Chithira Thirunal turned his attention towards business and acquired some shares in the spice trading company "Aspinwall Ltd". In the early 1970s, when the English owners decided to withdraw their investment, major portion of the company's shares was bought by Sree Chithira Thirunal. After his demise, his legal heirs in the Travancore royal family hold the controlling interests of the company to date. As part of the agreement during Travancore-Cochin Union formation, the control of Sree Padmanabhaswami Temple was also left to Sree Chithira Thirunal. When the Privy Purse was cancelled, according to his niece and writer Aswathy Thirunal Gowri Lakshmi Bayi, in one stroke, he lost 1.8 million (per year), the majority of which he was using to support the Padmanabhaswami Temple, despite this, he supported the temple from his own private funds. As Padmanabhadasa and hereditary head trustee, he conducted the Murajapam and Lakshadeepam ceremonies in Padmanabhaswamy Temple, more times than all his predecessors. He also decided to use electric lights for the first time for the Lakshadeepam when there was scarcity of oil and cost escalation. Under his decision, Padmanabhaswami Temple was electrified except inside the Sreekovil. He also brought forth Pension system for the employees of Padmanabhaswami Temple.

On 28 December 1971, Sree Chithira Thirunal lost his privy purse when the Government of India de-recognized the status of the Maharajahs of the erstwhile princely states, as rulers and was thus politically stripped. However the titles as well as other clauses of the agreements signed between the Government of India and the Maharaja in 1947 legally still hold. He thus became the Titular Maharajah of Travancore from 1971. The famous Sree Chitra Thirunal Institute of Medical Sciences and Technology was created with the personal funds of Sree Chithira Thirunal, after Privy Purse was cancelled by the Govt. Of India. Sree Chithira Thirunal established many charitable trusts for helping the needy financially in medical, educational and cultural fields. Sree Chithira Thirunal also sponsored the higher education of a young K. R. Narayanan who went on to become the 10th President of India.

=== Personal life ===
Sree Chithira Thirunal was famous for his devotion and piety towards his family deity Sree Padmanabha and many has often compared him to his ancestor Maharaja Anizham Thirunal Marthanda Varma in terms of devotion to the Sree Padmanabhaswamy Temple. According to his niece, Pooyam Thirunal Gauri Parvathi Bayi, Sree Chithira Thirunal led a simple life as Padmanabhadasa and that he had a tremendous sense of humour, love for painting and drawing, fondness for knowledge about Puranas, religion, politics and history. Chithira Thirunal's devotion to Sree Padmanabha Swamy was very famous and had been referred to by many leaders including Sardar Patel, Indira Gandhi etc. He was called "Ponnammavan" by his family at Kowdiar.

== Death ==
According to niece and writer Aswathi Thirunal Gowri Lakshmi Bayi, by the late 1980s, Sree Chithira Thirunal's health had deteriorated rapidly. But against the warnings of his doctors, he continued to lead the Arattu Processions of Padmanabhaswamy Temple. And on 31 March 1991 despite his highly weakened body and advanced age, he led the procession, and other temple rituals, by walking barefoot with four and half kilogram sword in his hand, escorting the deities to the Shankumugham beach as well as back to the Padmaanabhaswamy Temple, which the common people considered as the symbol of Sree Chithira Thirunal's devotion to his Tutelary deity, Sree Padmanabha. After 15 days, he was hospitalized and was discharged after a couple of days.

On 11 July 1991, while getting ready for his daily morning darshan to Padmanabhaswamy Temple, Sree Chithira Thirunal fell down unconscious. It was diagnosed that he had suffered a stroke and was admitted to the Sree Chitra Thirunal Institute of Medical Sciences and Technology. He remained in a coma for nine days and died in the early morning of 20 July at age seventy-eight. After his death, there was a massive outpouring of public grief, he was a widely respected and much adored figure of Kerala. He was given full military as well government honours, as the Maharaja of Travancore as well as the former Supreme Commander-in-Chief of the Travancore Armed Forces and the then Hon. Colonel of the 9th and 16th Battalion (formerly the 1st & 2nd Travancore Infantry) of the Madras Regiment. The Indian Army oversaw and controlled the public proceedings of his cremation. He was cremated at his official residence, Kowdiar Palace, based on the rites and rituals of Kshatriyas. Adhering to Marumakkathayam Law, his funeral rites were done by his younger brother, Sree Uthradom Thirunal Marthanda Varma and his only nephew Sree Moolam Thirunal Rama Varma who are the legal heirs of Sree Chithira Thirunal. He had ruled Travancore for 67 years and at his death, was one of the last surviving rulers of a first-class princely state in the old British Raj. He was also the last surviving Knight Grand Commander of both the Order of the Star of India and of the Order of the Indian Empire. The Government of India issued a stamp in 1991, commemorating the reforms that marked the reign of Sree Chithira Thirunal as the Maharaja of Travancore. He was succeeded, as head of the Travancore royal house as well as the Titular Maharajah of Travancore, by his younger brother, Uthradom Thirunal Marthanda Varma.

=== Sree Chithira Thirunal Memorial Lecture ===
Every year, since 1992, the Sree Chithira Thirunal Memorial Lecture is held in the honour of the Maharajah on his birth anniversary at Kanakakunnu Palace, Thiruvananthapuram. The first ever Lecture was delivered by the then Vice President of India, Dr. K. R. Narayanan. The lecture is organized by Sree Chithira Thirunal Smaraka Samithi, a trust that organizes all celebrations related to the birth anniversary of the Maharajah every year.

=== Sree Chithira Thirunal National Award ===
The Sree Chithira Thirunal National Award was set up by the Sree Chithira Thirunal Trust in the memory of the Maharajah Sree Chithira Thirunal Balarama Varma in 2006. It carries a price of one lakh Indian rupees and a citation. It honours those individuals who have made exceptional contributions in fields such as science, sports, technology, literature, art, medicine, cinema and education.

The winners are selected by a panel consisting of trust chairman T. Raveendran Thampi, managing trustee T. Satheesh Kumar and by eminent individuals from different fields of the society. The first ever award from the trust was awarded to eminent scientist & former Chairman of ISRO G. Madhavan Nair (2006). Other winners include India's former National Security Advisor M K Narayanan (2007), agriculture scientist M S Swaminathan (2008), actor Mohanlal, veteran playback singer K J Yesudas(2010), diplomat Nirupama Rao, E. Sreedharan (2012), M T Vasudevan Nair (2013) former Indian Cricketer Sunil Gavaskar (2014), former Ambassador and vice chairman of the Kerala Higher Education Council T.P. Sreenivasan (2015), the world-renowned cardiac surgeon M S Valiathan (2016).

=== Books ===
- Sree Chithira Tirunal: Life and Times by Uma Maheshwari
- Sree Chithira Tirunal: Avasanathe Ezhunnallathu by Malayinkizhu Gopalakrishnan
- Sree Chithira Smruthikal by Varanad KP Shastrikal (Poetic)

== Titles ==
- 1912–1924: Sri Padmanabhadasa Maharajkumar Sri Balarama Varma II, Elaya Raja of Travancore
- 1924–1935: His Highness Sri Padmanabhadasa Vanchipala Balarama Varma II, Kulasekhara Kiritapathi Manney Sultan Maharaja Raja Ramaraja Bahadur, Shamsher Jang, Maharaja of Travancore
- 1935–1943: His Highness Sri Padmanabhadasa Vanchipala Sir Balarama Varma II, Kulasekhara Kiritapathi Manney Sultan Maharaja Raja Ramaraja Bahadur, Shamsher Jang, Maharaja of Travancore GCIE
- 1943–1944: Major His Highness Sri Padmanabhadasa Vanchipala Sir Balarama Varma II, Kulasekhara Kiritapathi Manney Sultan Maharaja Raja Ramaraja Bahadur, Shamsher Jang, Maharaja of Travancore GCIE
- 1944–1945: Lieutenant-Colonel His Highness Sri Padmanabhadasa Vanchipala Sir Balarama Varma II, Kulasekhara Kiritapathi Manney Sultan Maharaja Raja Ramaraja Bahadur, Shamsher Jang, Maharaja of Travancore GCIE
- 1945–1946: Colonel His Highness Sri Padmanabhadasa Vanchipala Sir Balarama Varma II, Manney Sultan Maharaja Raja Ramaraja Bahadur, Shamsher Jang, Maharaja of Travancore GCIE
- 1946–1991: Major-General His Highness Sri Padmanabhadasa Vanchipala Sir Balarama Varma II, Manney Sultan Maharaja Raja Ramaraja Bahadur, Shamsher Jang, Maharaja of Travancore GCSI, GCIE

== Honours ==
- King George V Silver Jubilee Medal, 1935
- Knight Grand Commander of the Order of the Indian Empire (GCIE), 1935
- King George VI Coronation Medal, 1937
- Knight Grand Commander of the Order of the Star of India (GCSI), 1946
- Indian Independence Medal, 1947

== See also ==
- G. V. Raja
- Travancore royal family
- Order of the Star of India
- Order of the Indian Empire
- University of Kerala
- C. P. Ramaswami Aiyar
- Vaikom Satyagraha
- Temple Entry Proclamation
- Travancore rupee
- Travancore-Cochin
- Princely state

Chithira Thirunal Balarama Varma Venad Kulasekhara dynasty Born: 7 November 1912
Regnal titles
Preceded by Moolam Thirunal	Maharaja of Travancore; 1924–1949	Succeeded by Monarchy abolished
Political offices
Preceded by Post created 1 July 1949	Rajpramukh of the Travancore-Cochin Union; 1949–1956	Succeeded by Post succeeded by that of Governor of Kerala
Titles in pretence
Preceded by None	— TITULAR — Maharaja of Travancore; 1949–1971; Reason for succession failure: Monarchy abolished	Succeeded by Uthradom Thirunal Marthanda Varma
