= T. K. Madhavan =

Indian social reformer

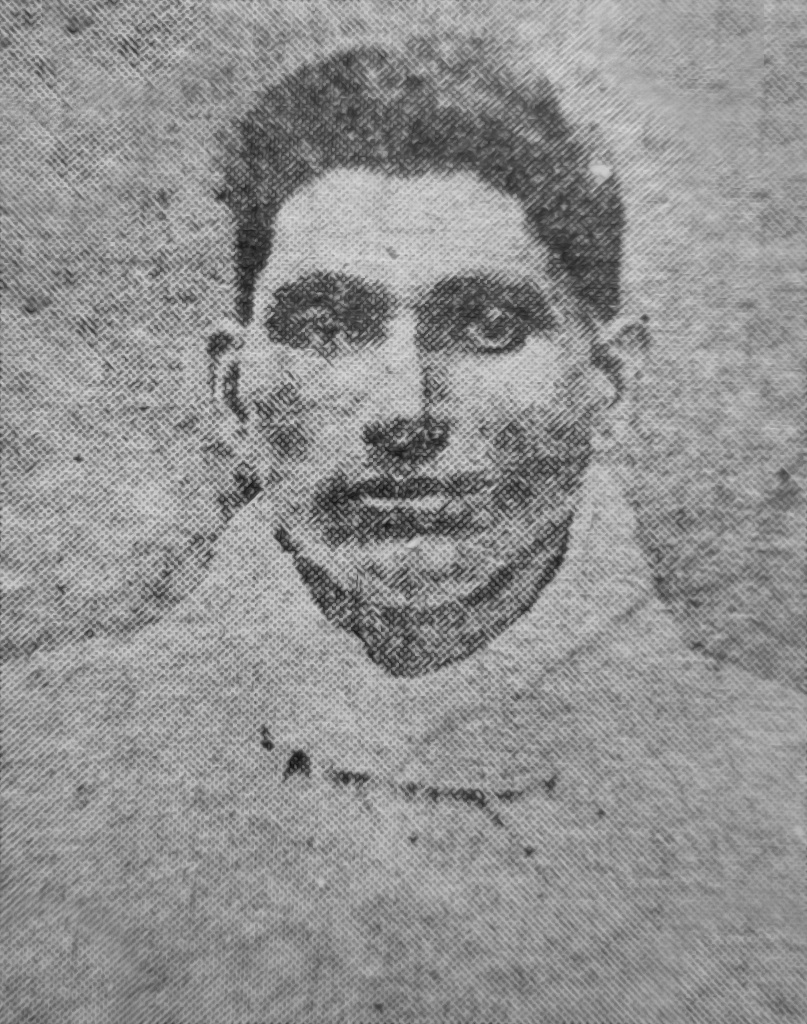
- Born: 2 September 1885; Karthikappally, Haripad, Kingdom of Travancore, India (present day Karthikappally, Alappuzha, Kerala, India)
- Died: 27 April 1930 (aged 44)
- Occupations: Social reformer; Freedom fighter
- Spouse: Narayani Amma
- Children: 2

T. K. Madhavan (2 September 1885 – 27 April 1930), also known as Deshabhimani Madhavan, was an Indian social reformer, journalist and revolutionary, who was involved with the Sree Narayana Dharma Paripalana Yogam (SNDP Yogam). He hailed from Alappuzha, Kerala and led the struggle against Social discrimination which was known as Vaikom Satyagraha.

== Early life ==
Madhavan was born on 2 September 1885 at Karthikappally, Alappuzha, Kerala as the son of Kesavan Channar of Alummoottil family and Ummini Amma of Komalezhathu family. Alummoottil family was one of the wealthiest and influential Ezhava families in the erstwhile Kingdom of Travancore.

His maternal uncle was Komalezhathu Kunjupilla was a member of the Sree Moolam Praja Sabha.

== Career ==
Temple Entry Proclamation

In 1917, Madhavan took over the daily newspaper, Deshabhimani. He was involved in the Temple Entry Movement, which fought for the entry for all communities to the temples of Kerala. He fought for the right of temple entry for all.

In 1918, Madhavan was elected to the Sree Moolam Praja Sabha, a legislative council of Travancore. In the same year he made his maiden speech at the Sree Moolam Assembly in lieu of his uncle Komalezhathu Kunjupillai Chekavar. He presented a resolution seeking permission of temple entry and right to worship to all people, irrespective of caste and community. He moved the resolution for the eradication of untouchability in the Kakkinada session of Indian National Congress in 1923.

In 1924, Vaikom Sathyagraha started under the leadership of T.K. Madhavan, K. Kelappan, and K.P. Kesava Menon, to get the right of oppressed class of people to travel through the road in front of Vaikom Sree Mahadeva temple. Madhavan and Kesava Menon were arrested and imprisoned. Finally, the Maharaja of Travancore agreed to open the road to all class of people and the Vaikom Sathyagraha was a great success. However, he had to continue his struggle for the temple entry.

In 1927, Madhavan was made the organizing secretary of the SNDP Yogam. T.K Madhavan formed a voluntary organization "Dharma Bhata Sangham" to strengthen the activities of SNDP Yogam.

It was T.K. Madhavan who wrote the biography of Dr. Palpu.

== Meeting with Gandhi ==
T. K. Madhavan's meeting with Gandhi on 24 September 1921 at Tirunelveli was a turning point in the history of Kerala. Madhavan persuaded Gandhi to address the people of Kerala, regarding his stand against untouchability. He also persuaded Gandhi to visit Vaikom and support the movement. Vaikom Satyagraha was a struggle of the backward class people of Kerala for establishing their right to walk through the temple roads of Vaikom, a small temple town in South Kerala. The centre of the movement was the Sree Mahadeva temple at Vaikom. Gandhi agreed to include the issue in the agenda of the Indian National Congress. Gandhi's visit to Vaikom made a significant impact and in November 1925, all including Ezhavas and other backward communities were allowed to walk on the temple roads.

== Death ==
Madhavan died at his residence on 27 April 1930. A monument was raised in his honour at Chettikulangara. In 1964, T. K. Madhava Memorial College was founded at Nangiarkulangara.

== See Also (Social reformers of Kerala) ==
- Chattampi Swamikal
- Sree Narayana Guru
- Dr. Palpu
- Kumaranasan
- Rao Sahib Dr. Ayyathan Gopalan
- Brahmananda Swami Sivayogi
- Vaghbhatananda
- Mithavaadi Krishnan
- Moorkoth Kumaran
- Ayyankali
- Ayya Vaikundar
- Pandit Karuppan
