= Anantha Padmanabhaswami Temple, Chennai =

Religion
- Affiliation: Hinduism
- District: Chennai
- Deity: Anantha Padmanabhaswamy

Location
- Location: Chennai
- State: Tamil Nadu
- Country: India

Architecture
- Completed: 1962

The Anantha Padmanabhaswami Temple is a Hindu temple in the neighbourhood of Adyar in Chennai, India. The temple is located on 2nd Main Road, Gandhi Nagar, near the Fortis Malar Hospital. Dedicated to the Hindu god Anantha Padmanabhaswamy (Vishnu), the temple is named after the Padmanabhaswamy Temple in Thiruvananthapuram and the deity Vishnu is depicted reclining on the mythological five-headed serpent as in the Padmanabhaswamy Temple of Thiruvananthapuram. The temple was constructed in 1962 on land donated by Chithira Thirunal, the last Maharaja of Travancore and caters to Chennai's Malayali community. The temple is constructed in the Kerala style.

Within the premises of the temple, lie an yagashala for conducting daily sermons. There is also a statue of Chithira Thirunal, the last Maharajah of Travancore unveiled by Lord Erskine, the then Governor of Madras on 29 September 1939 commemorating the Temple Entry Proclamation.

== See also ==
- Religion in Chennai
