= Guruvayur Satyagraha =

1931–32 non-violent protest in Thrissur, India

Guruvayur Satyagraha took place in 1931–32 and was a Satyagraha (non-violent protest) in the present-day Thrissur district, which was then part of Ponnani Taluk of Malabar district, now part of Kerala, India. It was an effort to allow entry for Marginalised communities into the Guruvayur Temple.

== Background ==
The Guruvayur Satyagraha was led by K. Kelappan, who undertook a hunger strike for 12 days until it was abandoned because of a request from Mahatma Gandhi and the Indian National Congress. Gandhi hailed it as "the miracle of modern times" and "a smriti which is peoples charter of spiritual emancipation".

When Samuthiri, the temple trustee, was reluctant to concede as the second phase of the struggle K.Kelappan and Manathu Padmanabhan started fast unto death from 22 September 1932 onwards. But due to Gandhiji's intervention on 2 October, the struggle was withdrawn. According to Gandhi, Kelappan had committed two errors. In the first instance, he ought to have previously consulted Gandhi, as an expert director in matters like fast, but he failed to do so; secondly, he should have given the Zamorin (Temple guardians) reasonable notice of his intention to go on fast. Gandhi felt coercion in Kelappan's fast. One of the major incidents that happened was the assault of A.K Gopalan by the opponents of the satyagraha movement. It roused the passion of the rebels to attempt a forceful entry into the temple and led to the provisional closure of the temple.

Subsequently, there was an opinion poll held at Ponnani taluk in which 77 per cent favoured the entry of all castes into the temples. Leaders, from various parts of Kerala, were later in leadership of C. Rajagopalachari and P. Krishna Pillai and A. K. Gopalan, took part in the effort. Similarly, the right to enter temples was granted to Backward Hindu communities in 1936 in Travancore by the Maharajah of Travancore followed by the Temple Entry Proclamation.

== See also ==
- Vaikom Satyagraha
- T.K. Madhavan
