= Sree Chitra Art Gallery =

Gallery in Thiruvananthapuram, India

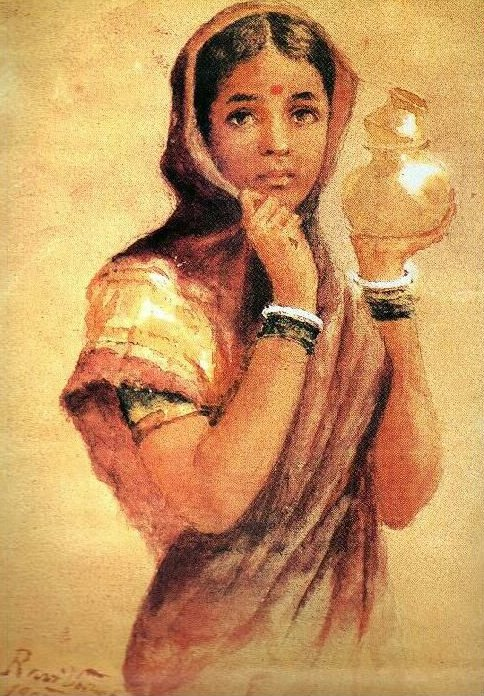
Raja Ravi Varma, The Milkmaid (1904)

Sree Chitra Art Gallery is an art gallery in Thiruvananthapuram, India, established in 1935. It is located in the northern grounds of the Napier Museum. It was inaugurated by Chithira Thirunal Balarama Varma. The gallery features a unique collection of traditional and contemporary paintings, including the works of Raja Ravi Varma, Nicholas Roerich, Svetoslav Roerich, Jamini Roy, Rabindranath Tagore, V. S. Valiathan, C. Raja Raja Varma, and K. C. S. Paniker. There are approximately 1100 paintings at the gallery.

== Overview ==
The art gallery has on display works from the Mughal, Rajput, Bengal, Rajastani, and Tanjore schools of art. It also has an oriental collection of Chinese, Japanese, and Balinese paintings, Tibetan Thangka, and unique collections of Indian mural paintings from pre-historic times. Other items of interest include miniatures from different parts of the world, reproductions of murals of Ajanta, Bagh, Sigiriya, and Sittannavasal, and manuscripts of archival importance. The gallery houses 400-year-old Tanjore miniature paintings.

The gallery has 15 original works by the Roerichs and 43 original works by Raja Ravi Varma. Ravi Varma's rare pencil sketches are also displayed at the gallery. The paintings of Ravi Varma which were earlier kept at Chithralaya in Kilimanoor were given to the art gallery by the Kilimanoor Palace as a permanent loan in 1941. The palace originally handed over 70 Ravi Varma paintings but some of them are not on display at the art gallery due to space constraints. The Kerala government undertook the restoration of Ravi Varma paintings in 2005. Ravi Varma's masterpiece paintings Shakuntala and Damayanti Talking to a Swan are displayed at the gallery.

In 2010, the gallery was closed for renovation as fire broke out due to a short circuit. In 2013, some paintings of C. Raja Raja Varma were reported damaged due to moisture. This included the paintings Secundarabad Lake, Local Toddy Shop, and Himalaya. Nine oil paintings and one water colour painting of Ravi Varma are dumped in the store room for lack of space. This included the paintings Lady Swinging, Mysore Khedda, Sreerama Break the Bow, Two Horses, Procession, Portrait Study, and Butterfly. The Kilimanoor Palace had lodged an official complaint that some of the paintings it handed over to the art gallery were missing. Due to the space constraint, a new building was proposed for the gallery and foundation stone was laid in 1985, but the work did not progress.
