= Vaikom Satyagraha =

Indian social movement

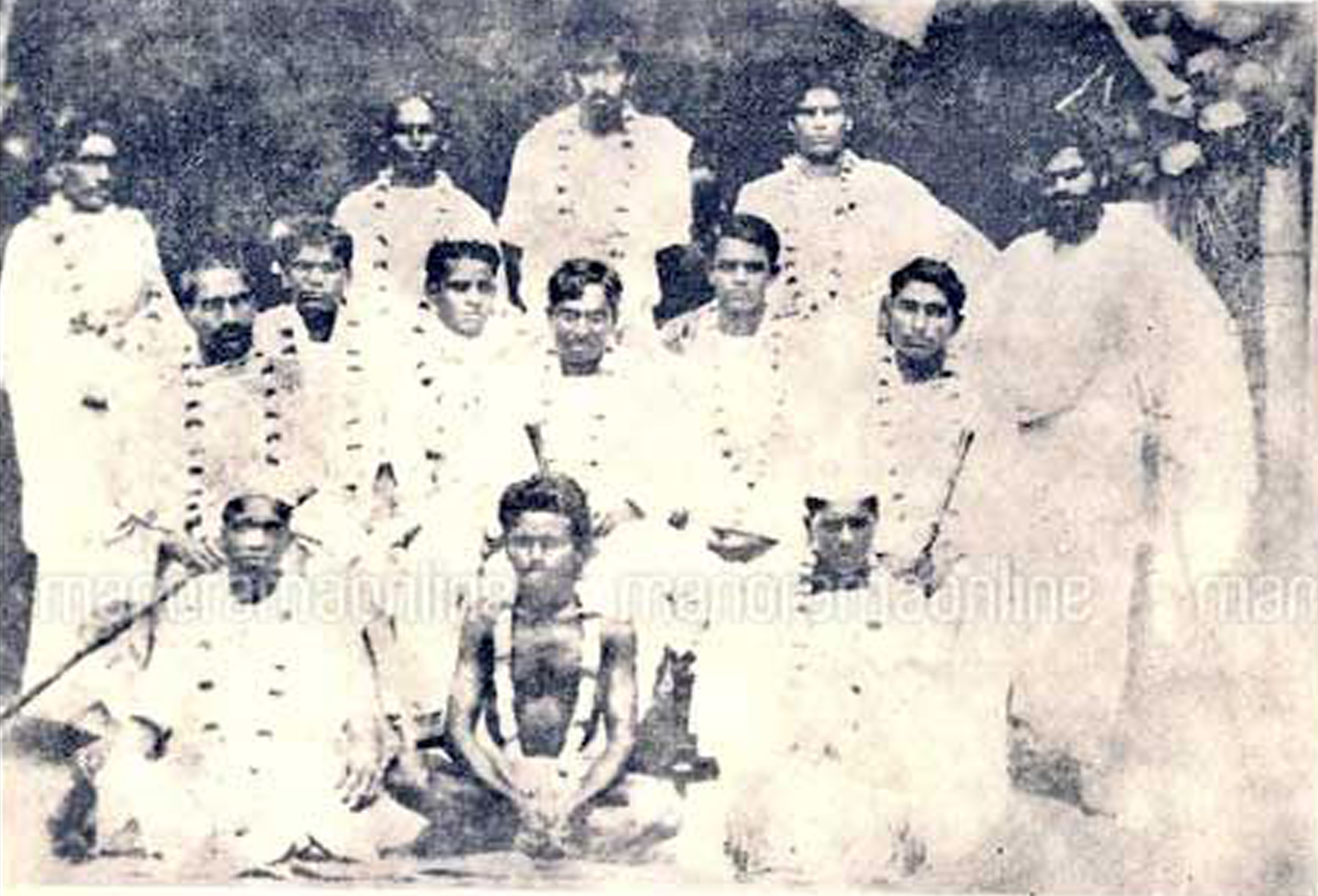
- Leaders of Vaikom Satyagraha including T. K. Madhavan (sitting: middle row, last as one views the photograph) K. Kumar (standing last in the row behind TK Madhavan: (bearded) K. P. Kesava Menon (sitting, third) and Amachadi Thevan.
- Duration: March 1924 to November 1925
- Location: Vaikom Temple, Travancore
- Type: Nonviolent agitation
- Motive: Public access
- Organised by: T. K. Madhavan; K. Kelappan; George Joseph; K. P. Kesava Menon; Mannath Padmanabhan
- Outcome: North, South and West public roads to Vaikom Mahadeva Temple opened. Protestors released.

Vaikom Satyagraha was a nonviolent agitation for access to the prohibited public environs of the Vaikom Temple in the Kingdom of Travancore that took place from 30 March 1924 to 23 November 1925. Kingdom of Travancore was known for its rigid and oppressive caste system. The campaign was conducted and led by Congress leaders T. K. Madhavan, K. Kelappan, and K. P. Kesava Menon. Other notable leaders who participated in the campaign include Mannath Padmanabhan, George Joseph, and "Periyar" E. V. Ramasamy, and it was noted for the active support and participation offered by different communities and a variety of activists.

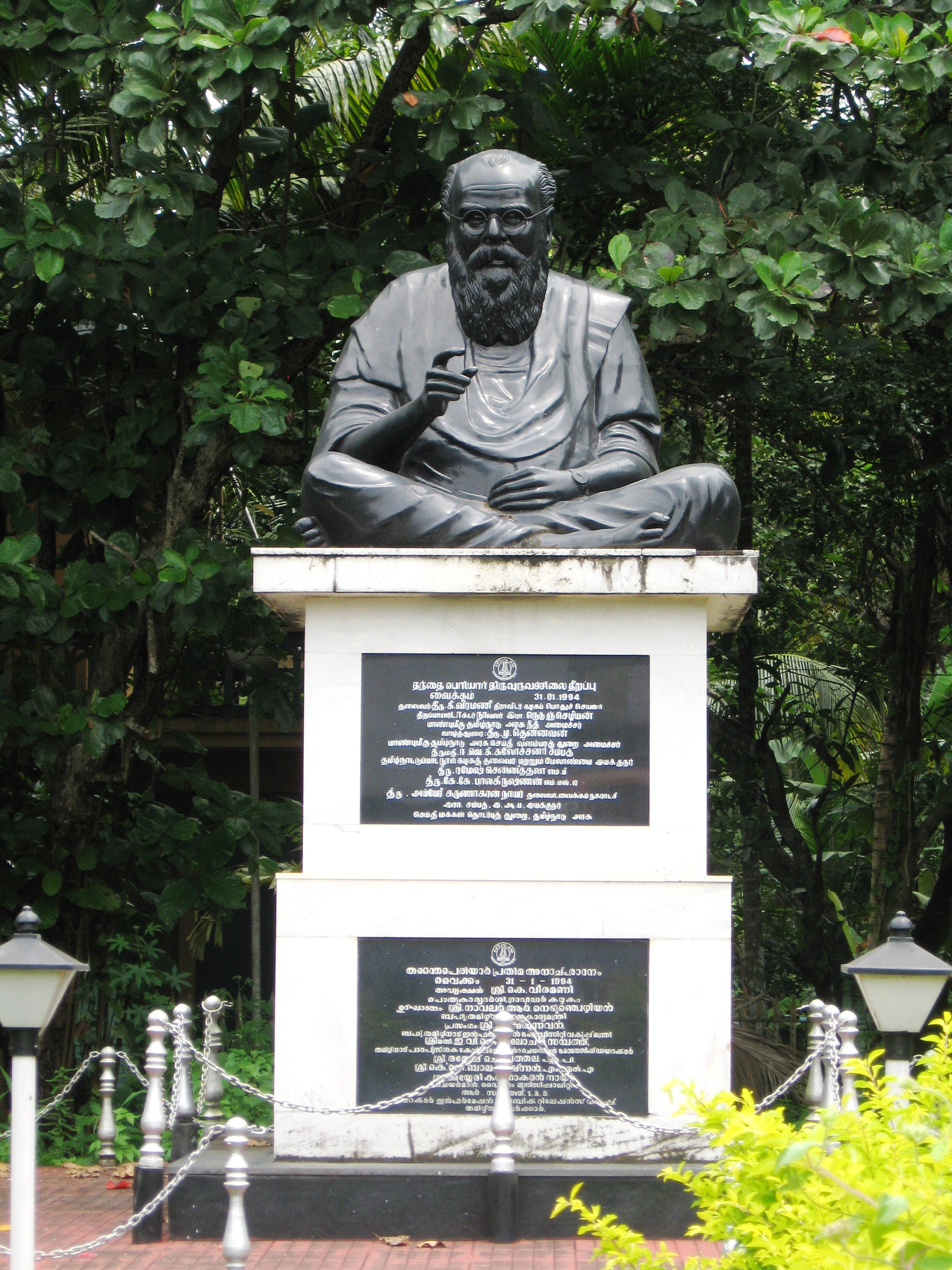
Thanthai Periyar statue at Vaikom town in Kottayam, Kerala

Most of the great temples in the princely state of Travancore had for years forbidden lower castes (untouchables) not just from entering, but also from walking on the surrounding roads. The agitation was conceived by the Ezhava Congress leader and a follower of Sri Narayana Guru, T. K. Madhavan. It demanded the right of the Ezhavas and 'untouchables' to use roads around the Vaikom Temple.

Mahatma Gandhi himself visited Vaikom in March 1925. Travancore government eventually constructed new roads near the temple for the use of lower castes. The roads, however, kept the lower castes adequately away from the near environs of the Vaikom Temple and the temple remained closed to the lower castes.

After the intervention of Mahatma Gandhi, a compromise was reached with Regent Sethu Lakshmi Bayi who released all those arrested and opened the north, south and west public roads leading to Vaikom Mahadeva Temple to all castes. Bayi refused to open the eastern road. The compromise was criticized by E. V. Ramasamy "Periyar" and some others. Only in 1936, after the Temple Entry Proclamation, was access to the eastern road and entry into the temple allowed to the lower castes. Vaikom Satyagraha markedly brought the method of nonviolent public protest to Kerala.

== Background ==
- T. K. Madhavan, an Ezhava leader, first advanced the question of temple entry of lower castes in an editorial in Deshabhimani newspaper in December 1917. Temple entry of lower castes was discussed and resolutions were introduced at meetings of S N D P Yogam and the Travancore Assembly between 1917 and 1920. In 1919, an assembly of nearly 5,000 Ezhavas demanded the right to entry into all Hindu temples managed by the Government of Travancore.
- In November 1920, T. K. Madhavan, walked beyond the regulatory notice boards on a road near the Vaikom Temple. He later publicly announced his defiance to the district magistrate. Madhavan's later temple-entry meetings in Travancore instigated counter-agitations from caste Hindus.
- T. K. Madhavan met with Mahatma Gandhi at Tirunelveli in September 1921 to inform him of the predicament of Ezhavas in Kerala. Gandhi, though initially oblivious to the position of the community in state, offered his support for the movement ("you must enter temples and court imprisonment if law interferes".).
- At the 1923 Indian National Congress session at Kakinada, a resolution was passed which committed the party to work for 'the eradication of untouchability'. This resolution was introduced by T. K. Madhavan. The resolution also stated that 'temple entry was the birthright of all Hindus'.
- In January 1924, Congress leader K. Kelappan convened an 'Anti-untouchability Committee' within the K P C C. Kelappan later toured southern Kerala with a contingent of Congress leaders from Malabar District. Madhavan also succeeded in getting the finances, the Congress support and pan-India attention for the satyagraha. The S N D P Yogam also conveyed its approval of the agitation.

== The agitation ==
Vaikom Siva Temple, like most other great temples of Kerala, had for years forbidden lower castes and the 'untouchables' not just from entering, but also from walking on the surrounding roads.

- On 30 March 1924, a Menon, a Pulaya and an Ezhava activist, followed by thousands of others, most of whom in khadar, attempted to walk on the Vaikom temple roads. The three were arrested by the Travancore police. More Congress activists, repeating the same act, were arrested by the police till the 10th April. Among the arrested where K. P. Kesava Menon, T. K. Madhavan, and K. Kelappan. The other leaders who were arrested and convicted included TR Krishna Swami Iyer, K. Kumar, AK Pillai, Chittezhathu Sanku Pillai, Barrister George Joseph, EV Ramaswami Naikker also known as Periyar, Aiyyamuthu Gaudar and K Velayudha Menon.

Demonstrators marched each day to the Travancore police barricades (erected to "prevent clashes between communities"). They blocked the road, sat before the police lines on temple's four entrances and sang patriotic songs. Later in the campaign, activists undertook public fasts. During this period, some caste Hindus spurred attacks by ruffians on the protesters.

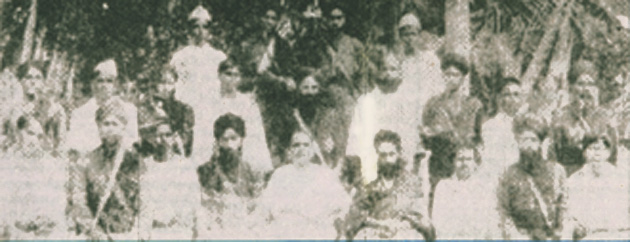
Photograph of Sikh Akalis at the Vaikom Satyagraha, ca.1924. Reprinted in Mathrubhumi Daily.

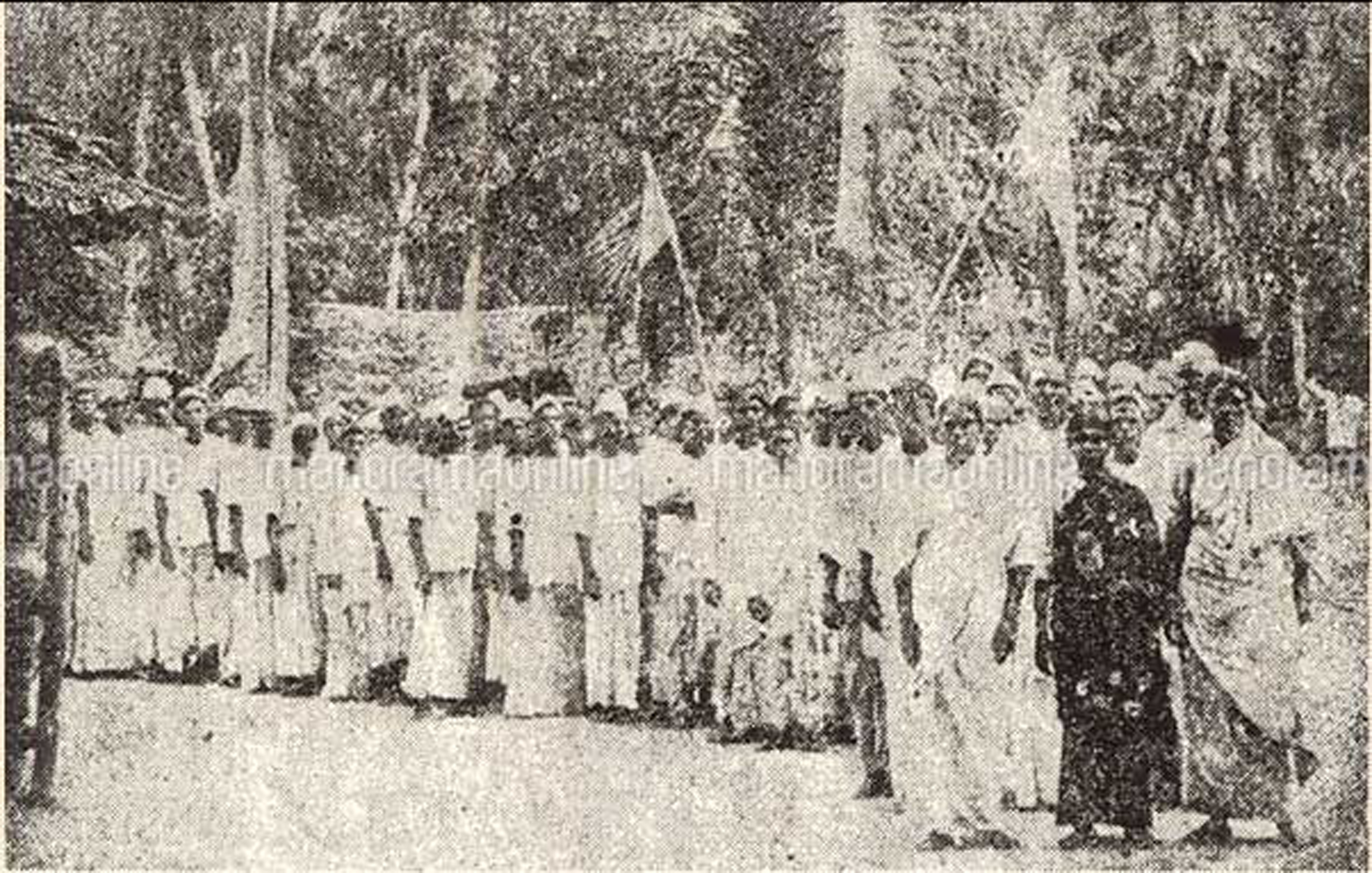
- A protest march during Vaikom Satyagraha
  The events at Vaikom attracted pan-India attention. Congress leader C. Rajagopalachari and E. V. Ramasamy "Periyar", then associated with the Congress, arrived at Vaikom and offered advice to the activists. Most of the prominent Nair Congress leaders were subsequently arrested and Christian (Congress leader) George Joseph assumed the charge of the agitation.
- The local Christian leadership was alienated by a statement by Gandhi asking them to keep clear from 'a Hindu affair' (April 1924). Sikh Akali activisits from Amritsar had also arrived at Vaikom to establish free food kitchens to the satyagrahis (April 1924). Gandhi called for the closure of the Sikh kitchens. E. V. Ramasamy "Periyar", then with the Congress, also participated in the satyagraha and was imprisoned twice. The participation earned Periyar the title "the Hero of Vaikom". Some radical participants such as K. Aiyappan associated themselves with forms of Communism.
- Mulam Thirunal, the king of Travancore, died in August 1924. At the advice of Gandhi, caste Hindus marched from Vaikom to Trivandrum to present a memorial to the ruler of Travancore (stating that caste Hindus did not object to lower castes using the roads) (starting from November 1924). Mannath Padmanabha Pillai, leader of the Nair community, led the second march to Trivandrum in 1925. A resolution to allow Ezhavas to use roads near the temple was defeated by one vote in the Travancore Legislative Council (opposed by all official members, introduced in October 1924, voted in February 1925).

=== Settlement ===
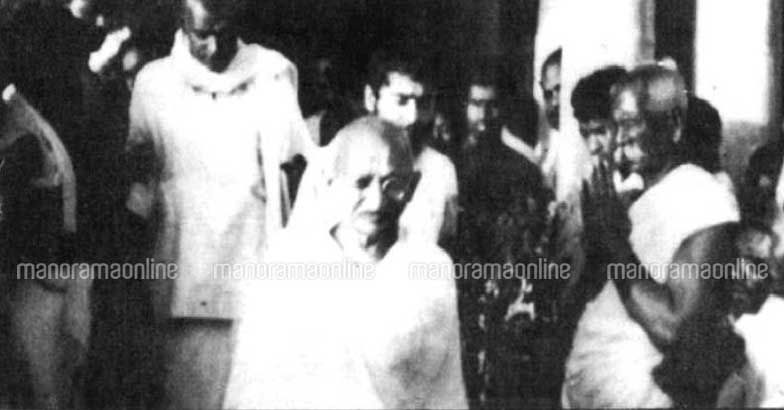
Gandhi in Cochin (during Vaikom Satyagraha)

Mahatma Gandhi, who had sent goodwill telegrams to the organizers, himself visited Vaikom in March 1925. Gandhi held discussions with all parties (the protesters, the Namboodiri Brahmins, Sri Narayana Guru, and the queen of Travancore). The police subsequently was withdrawn on the understanding that the activists would not enter the banned roads.

- The Vaikom Satyagraha settled with a compromise which allowed the entry of lower caste Hindus to (the newly constructed) roads on three sides of the Vaikom Temple. The other side and the temple remained closed to the lower castes (November 1925). The new roads also kept the lower castes adequately away from the near environs of the Vaikom Temple.
- The Vaikom Satyagraha had failed to convince the Ezhava leader Sri Narayana Guru. The Guru wanted activists to 'not only walk along the prohibited roads but enter the temple'. The word on the street hinted that the Narayana Guru had distanced himself from 'the activities of the S N D P'. He said to an Ezhava journalist,

The volunteers standing outside the barriers in heavy rains will serve no useful purpose...They should scale over the barricades and not only walk along the prohibited roads but enter all temples... It should be made practically impossible for anyone to observe untouchability.

— Sri Narayana Guru (June 1924)

== Legacy ==
- Vaikom Satyagraha introduced (sustained) nonviolent public protest in Kerala.
- The agitation revitalized the morale of the Congress Party in Kerala.
- T. K. Madhavan became of the General Secretary of the Sri Narayana Dharma Paripalana Yogam in 1927.
- Temple Entry Proclamation in Travancore (1936).

== See also ==
- Kandoth assault
- Channar revolt
- Punnapra-Vayalar uprising
- Temple Entry Proclamation
