= V. S. Valiathan =

Indian artist

Vattaparambil Sankaran Valiathan (October 1919 – 21 June 2006), commonly referred to as Artist V. S. Valiathan, was an Indian artist from Pandalam, Travancore (Present-day Pathanamthitta district, Kerala) who was known for his classical style of painting in the Raja Ravi Varma tradition. His paintings show muted colours and natural overtones.

== Early life ==
Valiathan was born at Pandalam, to Revathinal Ravi Varma Raja of the Pandalam Royal Family and Thottathil Madhavi Amma. His maternal grandfather Pandalathu Puthen Poomukhathu Kottarathil Aswathynal Godavarma Valiya Thmpuran was an artist in mural painting. Valiathan had his formal education from Thonnallur Malayalam Middle School and NSS English High School. He was trained in painting by Puthenveettil P. K. Gopala Pillai, who was his drawing master in school.

== Career ==
Valiathan followed a realistic style in his paintings. His paintings were inspired from surroundings, Indian epics, and world classics. He drew more than 2,000 portraits and subject paintings. His famous paintings include Kulakkadavu (Bathing Ghat), Themmadikkattu (The Ruffian Wind), Vreela Vivasa (The Bashful Damsel), Macbeth, Panchali, Venalkkalam (The Summer Season), Urangunnal Sundari (The Sleeping Beauty), Prakrithi Drishyam (The Landscape), Vasthrakshepam, Kurukshetra Yuddham (The Battle of Kurukshetra), Vishvamitranum Menakayum (Vishvamitra and Menaka), and Urvasy. Valiathan drew from imagination and did not use models for his paintings. Valiathan has his own rendition of The Last Supper.

Some of his paintings are on display at the Sree Chitra Art Gallery, Thiruvananthapuram. He had conducted many solo exhibitions of his paintings. Valiathan had his own art gallery and training centre by the name Chithrasala at Pandalam.

Besides painting, Valiathan was also interested in Kathakali. He authored a Kathakali story by the name Natyodbhavam, which was about the origin of Bharathanatyam. This was first staged on the occasion of Valiathan's 70th birthday celebrations. Valiathan had also directed a documentary about Swathi Thirunal.

== Personal life ==
Valiathan died on 21 June 2006 at Naduvilemalika Palace, Pandalam. In his obituary, the then Cultural Affairs Minister of Kerala, M. A. Baby observed that Valiathan's professional life was an example of an artist's integrity towards his own creations.

== Awards and recognitions ==
- Raja Ravi Varma Award, 2006
- Chitrakala Parishath Fellowship, 1996
- Kerala Lalitakala Academy Award, 2002
