= K. P. Kesava Menon =

Indian activist

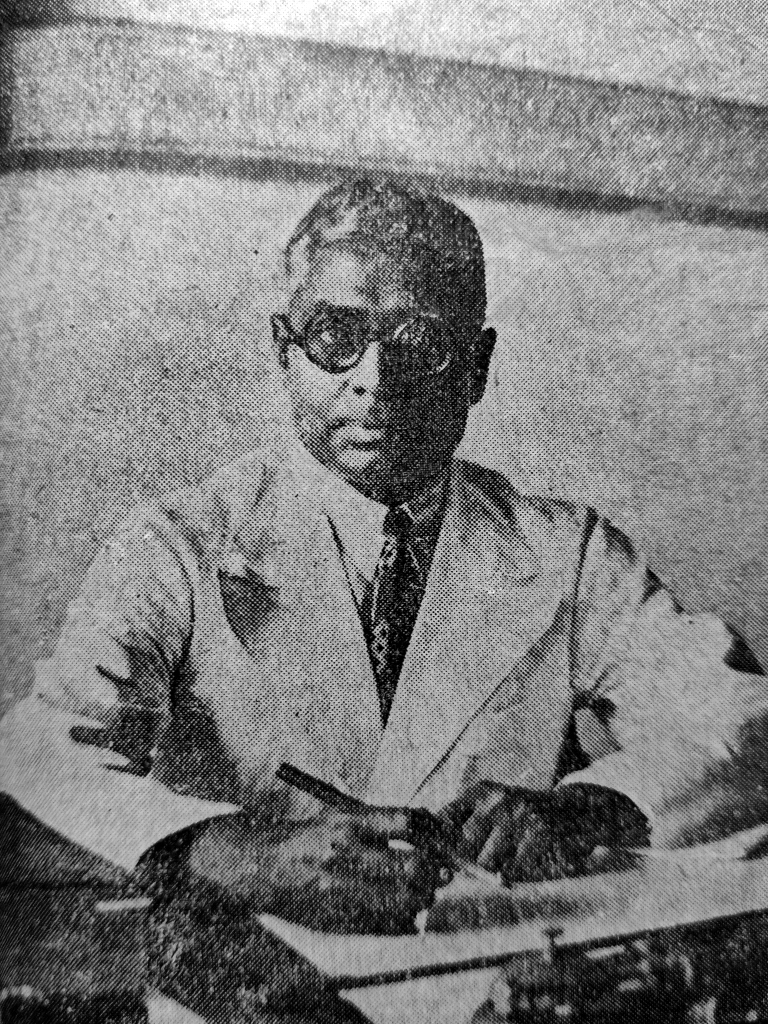
- Menon in 1937
- Born: 1 September 1886; Tharoor, Malabar District, Madras Presidency, British India (near present day Palakkad, Kerala, India)
- Died: 9 November 1978 (aged 92)
- Occupations: Politician; Social activist; Writer
- Spouse: Laxmi Nethyaramma
- Children: 5
- Relatives: K. P. Udayabhanu (nephew)

Kizhakke Potta Kesava Menon (1 September 1886 – 9 November 1978) was an Indian nationalist, idealist and Indian independence activist. Menon was the founder of Mathrubhumi, a popular daily newspaper which earned the second place in circulation in Kerala. In 1924, he led the Vaikom Satyagraha in Travancore. He was awarded the third highest civilian honour, Padma Bhushan, by the Government of India in 1966. He was conferred with an honorary doctorate (D.Litt) posthumously by University of Calicut in 1987. He was also the second Kerala Pradesh Congress Committee president and activist of INC.

== Biography ==
He was born in Tharoor, a village near Palakkad, in what was then Malabar District of the Madras Presidency, now the state of Kerala, as the son of Naduviledathil Bheemanachan and Meenakshi Amma. Kesava got his family name, Kizhakke Potta, through matrilineal succession.

He earned graduation in Arts from Madras University and obtained Bar-at-law from Middle Temple.

=== Activism ===
After his education, he became the secretary of Malabar Home rule League. In 1915 he joined the Indian National Congress. He served as the secretary of the Home Rule League's Malabar branch after starting practicing in Calicut. He was a part of the Home Rule League under the leadership of Annie Besant which presented a memorandum to the Secretary of State in London in 1917. He also wrote a dozen of books and collections of essays. In 1919, in Madras he organised sweepers and rikshaw drivers. He was among the earliest in Kerala to argue for abolition of 'untouchability'.

=== Mathrubhumi ===
Kesava Menon established the Malayalam language newspaper, Mathrubhumi in 1923. He was its Chief Editor from the beginning till his death, except for a brief interregnum he moved out of Kerala and went to practice law in Malaysia and Singapore. There also he was actively involved in nationalist movements. His autobiography, with the Malayalm title "Kazhinya Kaalam" and the English translation, "Bygone Days" has been published by Mathrubhumi Books.

== Personal life ==
Kesava Menon married Akathethara Malikalmaladom Laxmi Nethyaramma. Palakkatsseri Valiyaraja Malikalmaladom Shekhari (M.S.) Varma (the former Maharajah of Palghat) was the second of his five children (Since the first and second Rajas are residing outside India, it was the third Raja, KK Itti Pangi Achan who performed the religious duties on their behalf). The other four children are: Chellamma, Thankam, Padmini and Leela. The noted Malayalam film playback singer K. P. Udayabhanu was his nephew, being the son of his sister Ammu Nethyaramma.
