= Kandoth assault =

The Kandoth Assault was a clash In 1930 over temple entry. Lower castes were not allowed to walk in front of the Kandoth Temple Of The Thiyya Castes At Kandoth In Payyanur, Kannur. A.K. Gopalan led a procession to grieve the Harijans and the Thiyyar Leaders and the Thiyyar Women who witnessed the brutal beating of A.K.G and the Harijans.

== History ==
Kandoth is located near Payyannoor. Harijans were not allowed to walk on the public road in Kandoth. The inhabitants of Kandoth were of the Thiyyar community. Their temple was close to the road. Locals feared that the temple would be soiled and decided that no one was allowed to walk past it. K. V. Kunhi Rama Puthuval was sent to Vengayil Appukuttan Nair to discuss the situation.

The Keraliyan of Kandoth were invited. The content of these discussions remain private. Pothuval said that there would be a procession and no untoward incident would take place. A small group of Harijans led by Keralites arrived from Pazhayangadi. Many marched together. Keralites and A.K. Gopalan led the procession, which was attended by many women. Residents made the necessary arrangements in advance. As the procession approached the road, a large crowd, rushed forward and attacked A.K.G. and the Harijans. The women carried heavy sticks. A.K.G asked the accompanying women to run to safety. The attack lasted about half an hour. Women came carrying heavy wooden sticks and beat them. All the people present in Ghosha were beaten by these chiefs. But A.K.G Standing where Gopalan and Keralian were, he faced the barrage. Others fled. A.k.G told the accompanying women to run to safety. KG demanded. The attack lasted for half an hour. The "Kandoth short stick" was infamous in the press of the day. Many people were injured. A.K. Gopalan and Keralian fell unconscious. They were taken by car to the hospital, where they lay unconscious for several hours. Even the Keralite's death statement was taken. Took home in the morning This attack K. This was Gopalan's first physical attack in his political career. But the "Kandoth assault" was an event that found a prominent place in news coverage.

The "Connaught Short Stick" became infamous. Several people were injured. The Keralites and A.K.G fell unconscious and were taken to hospital.
