= Vaikom Sree Mahadeva Temple =

Hindu temple in Kerala

Vaikom Mahadeva Temple
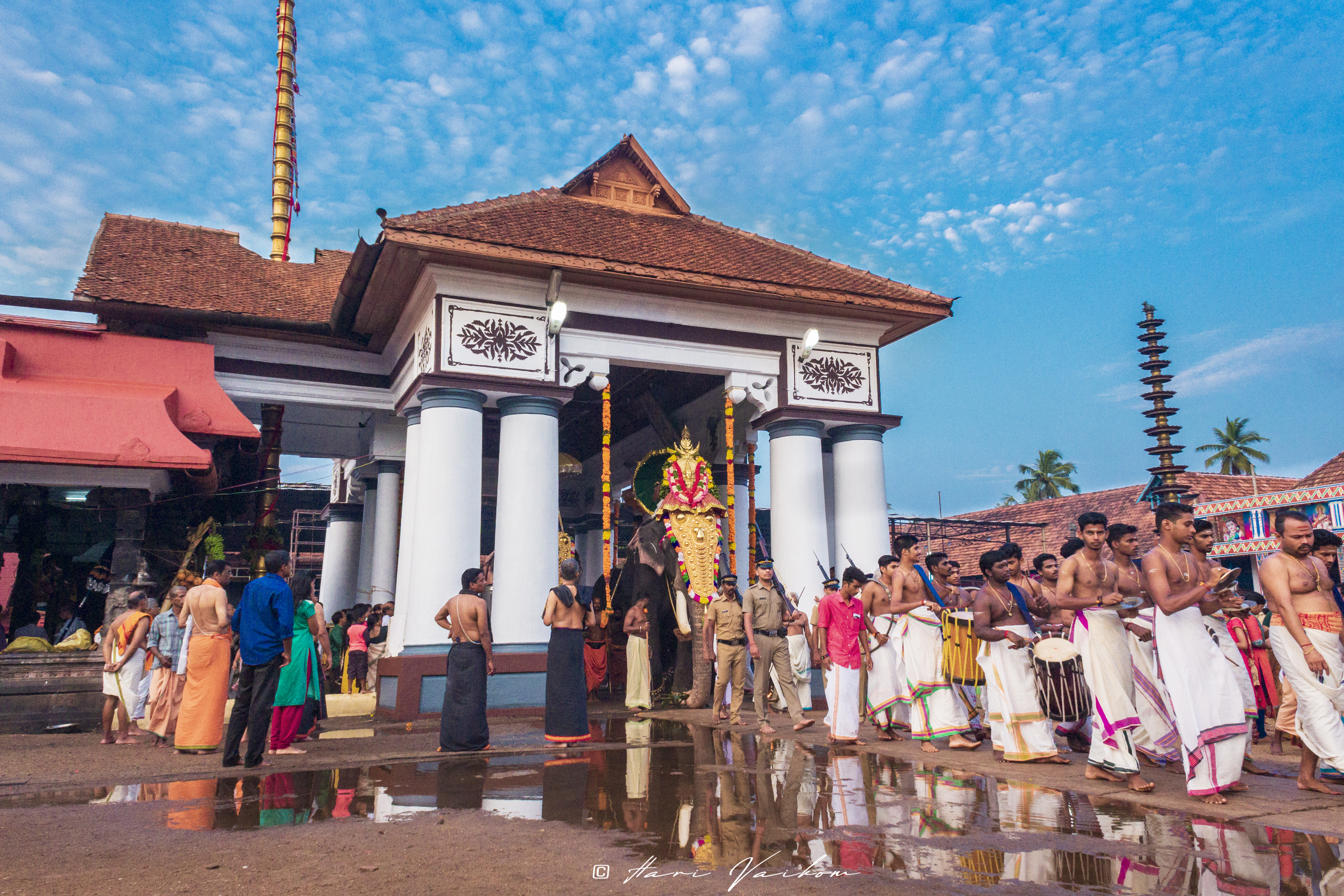
- Vaikom Mahadeva Temple

- Mahadeva Temple, Vaikom, Kottayam, Kerala

Religion
- Affiliation: Hinduism
- District: Kottayam
- Deity: Shiva
- Festivals: Vaikom Ashtami, Maha Shivaratri
- Governing body: Travancore Devaswom Board

Location
- Location: Vaikom
- State: Kerala
- Country: India
- Coordinates: 9°44′59.8″N 76°23′45.5″E

Architecture
- Type: Traditional Kerala style

Specifications
- Temple: One
- Elevation: 27.52 m (90 ft)

Website
- vaikomtemple.org

The Vaikom Sree Mahadeva Temple is a temple to the Hindu god Shiva in Vaikom, Kottayam, Kerala, India. It is one of the major Shiva temples in Kerala.

== Architecture ==
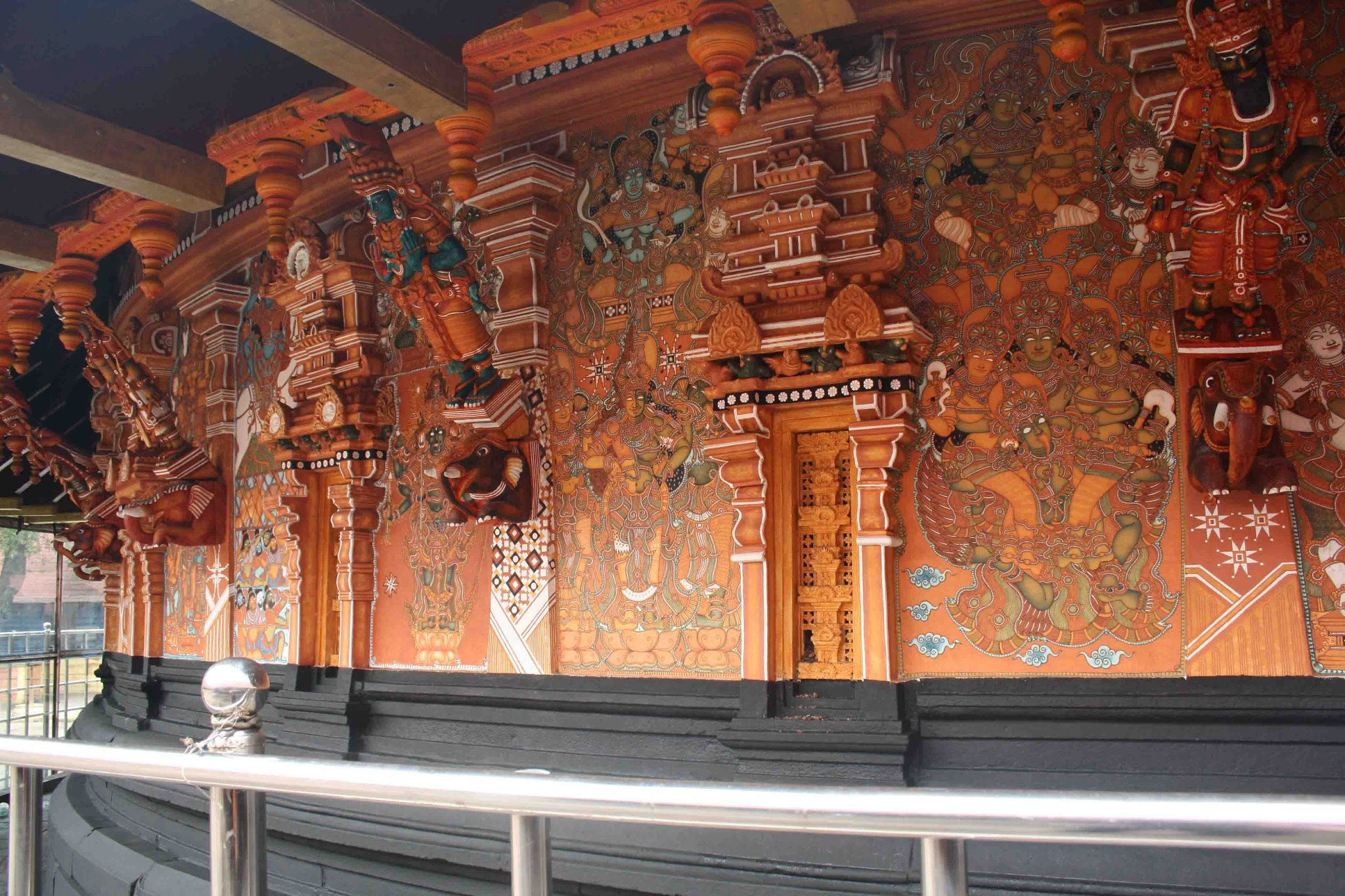
Mural paintings in the temple's sanctum

The sanctum sanctorum is apparently round in shape roofed with copper sheets and with two chambers. In fact, this is the only temple in Kerala with an oval shaped sanctum, though externally it appears like a circular temple. This oval shape is evident when the width of antharaala is measured. Only builders with exceptional skill can execute such marvellous architectural structures. The remnants of the basement of the original sanctum at the temple in Chengannur also reveal that it was elliptical in shape. It is believed that both these structures were built by the mythical architect Perumthachan,.

== Picture gallery ==
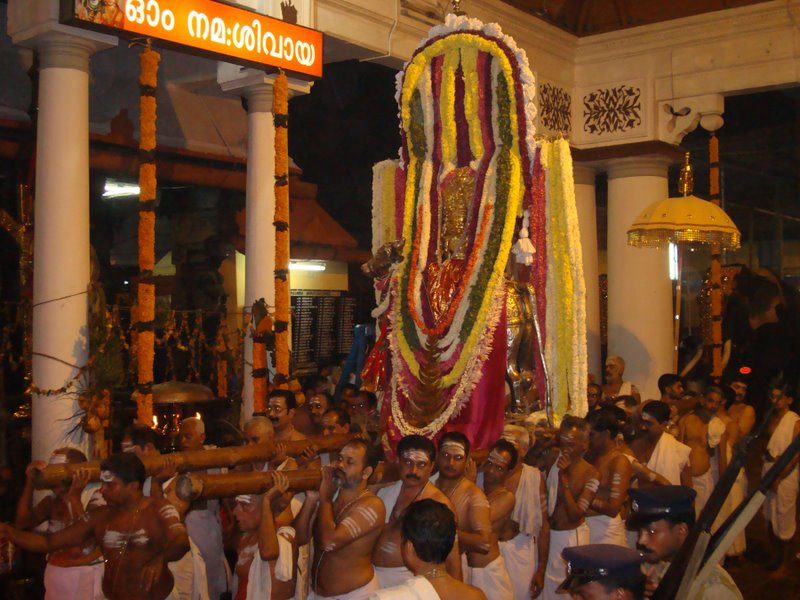
Decorated Rishabhavahanam

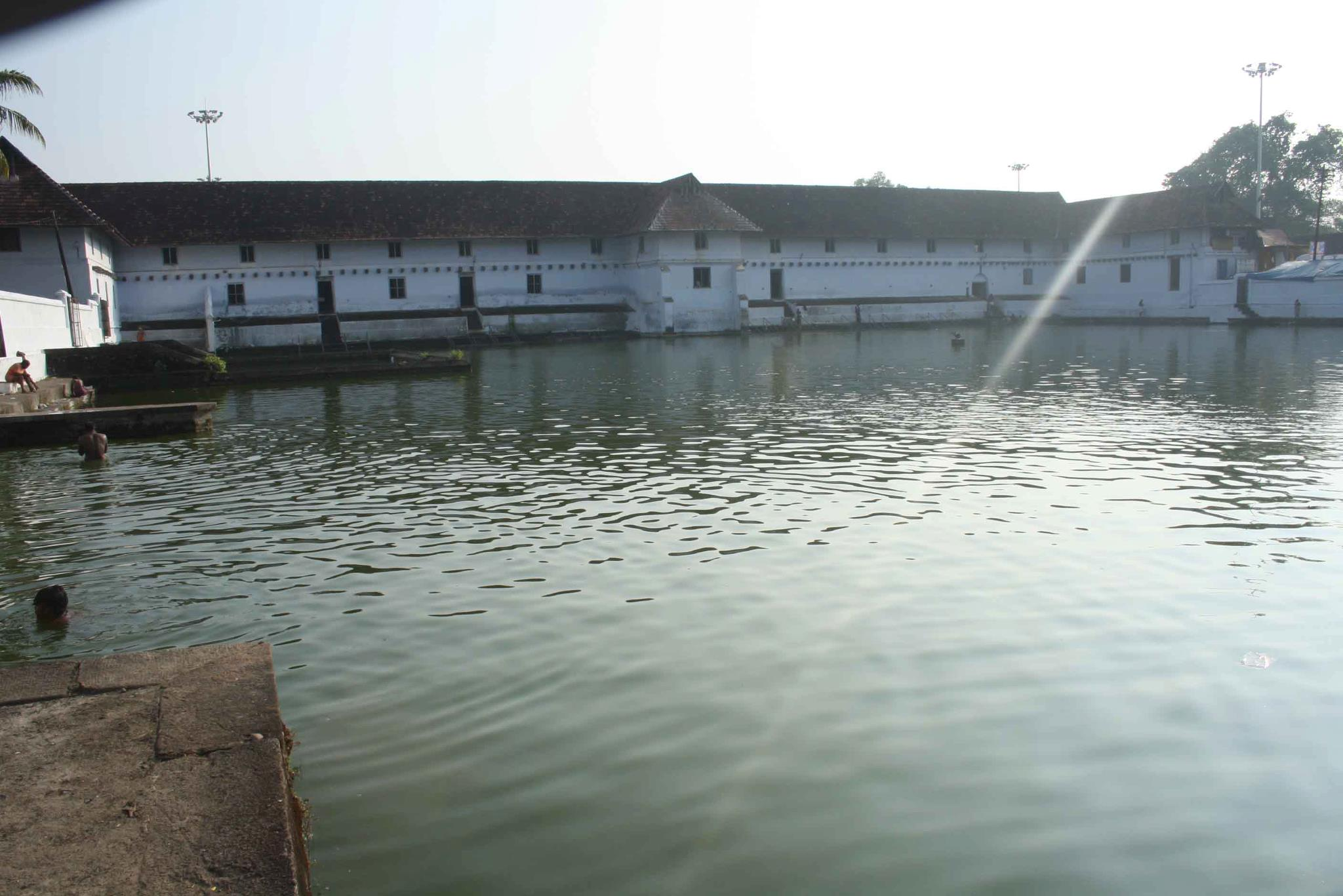
Temple pond (Pushkarini)

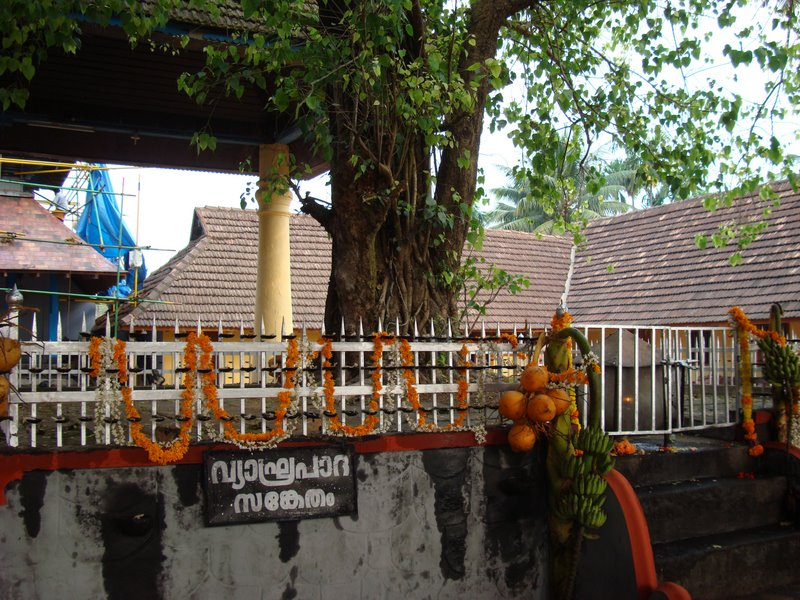
Vyakhrapada Sanketam

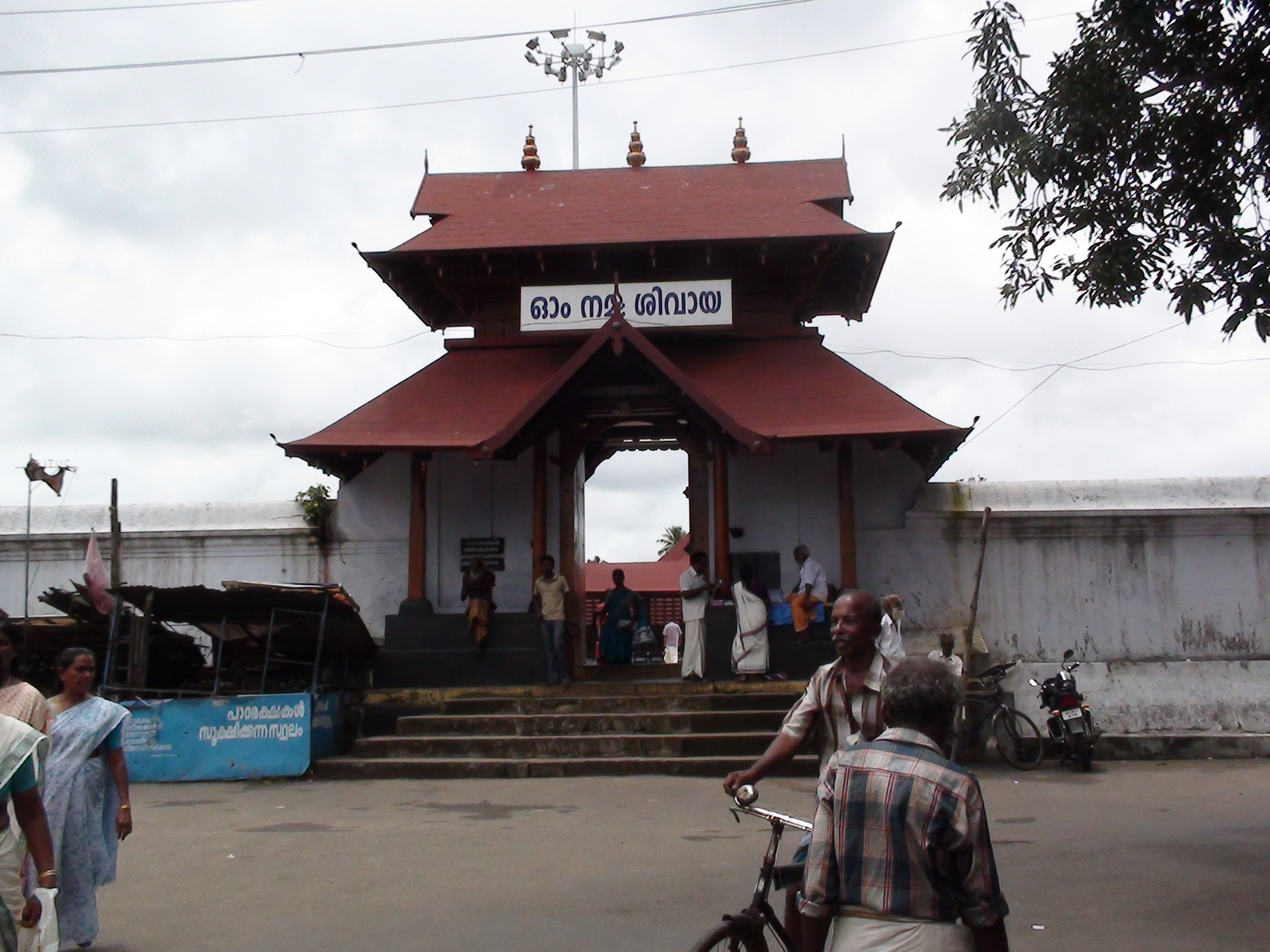
Padinjare Nada (Western gate)

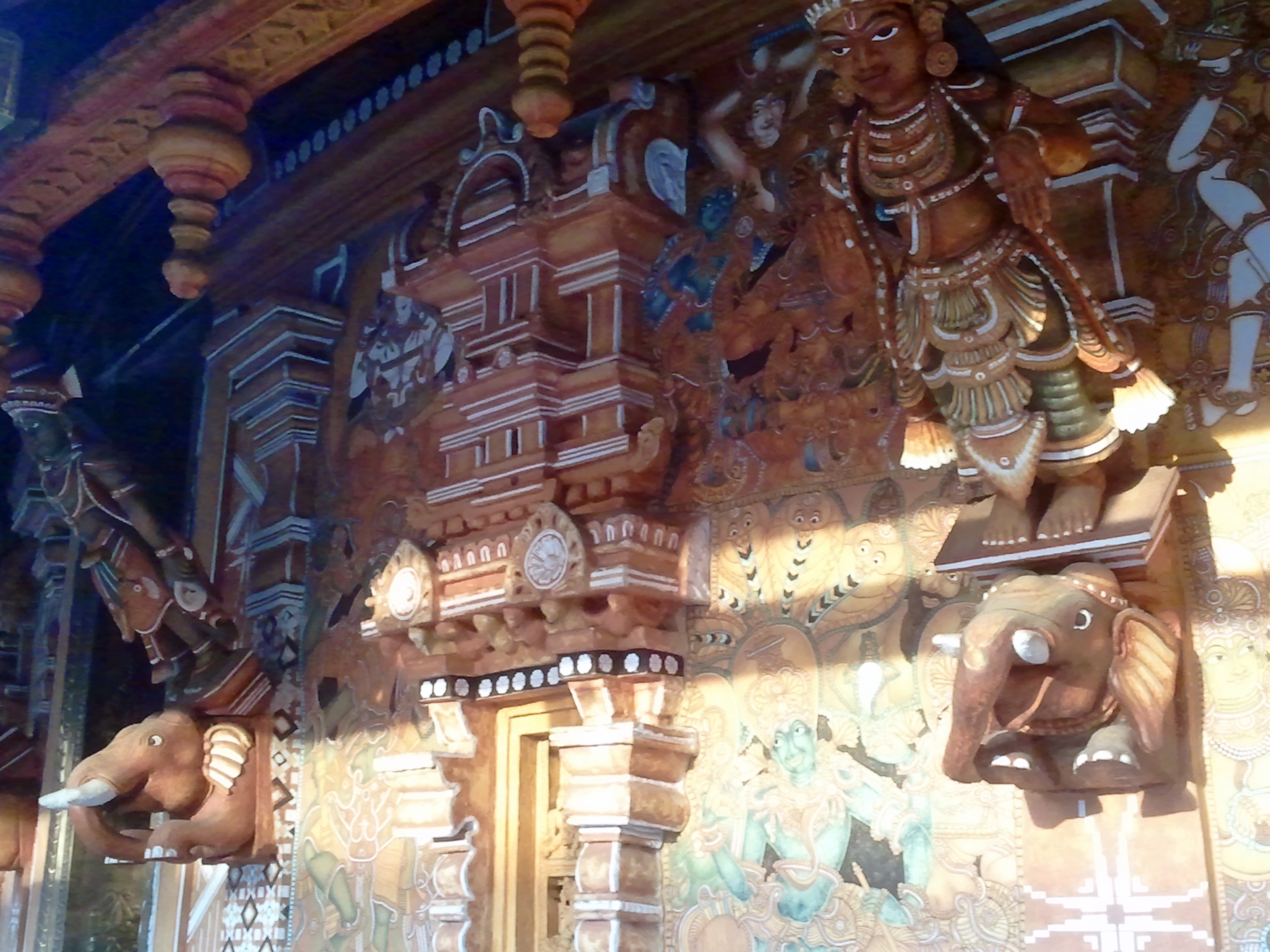
Mural paintings in the temple
