= Department of Finance (Kerala) =

Ministry in Kerala, India

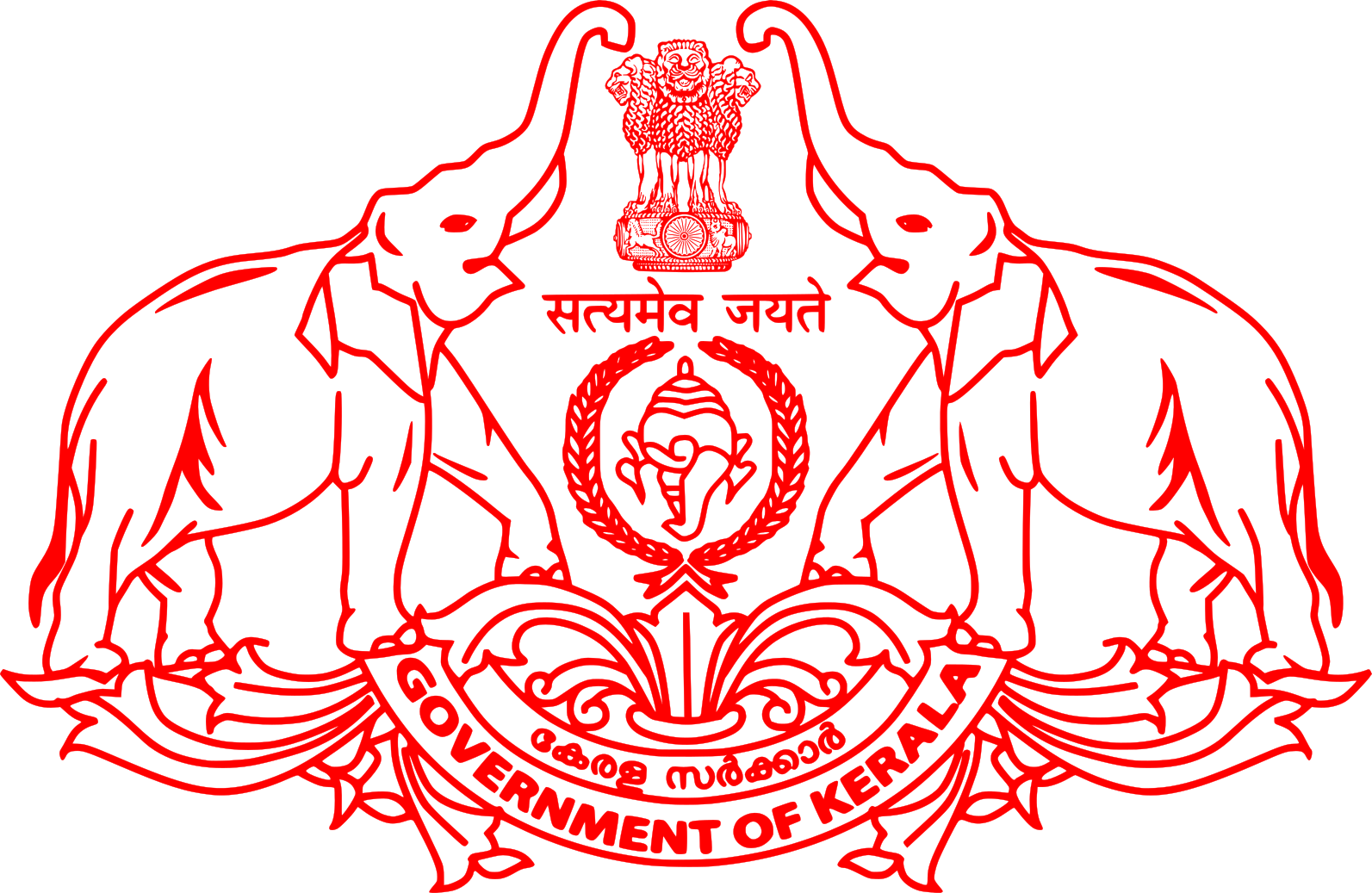

Department overview
- Formed: 1811; 215 years ago
- Jurisdiction: Kerala
- Headquarters: Thiruvananthapuram
- Minister responsible: V. D. Satheesan, Minister for Finance, Commercial & Agricultural Taxes, State Treasuries, State Insurance, Stamps and Stamp Duties.
- Department executives: K.R Jyothilal IAS, Additional Chief Secretary (Finance); Keshvendra Kumar IAS, Secretary (Finance Expenditure); Patil Ajit Bhagwatrao IAS, Secretary (Finance Resources)
- Parent department: Government of Kerala
- Child agencies: National Savings Department; Treasuries Department; State Insurance Department; State Audit Department; KIIFB Kerala Financial Corporation
- Website: http://www.finance.kerala.gov.in/

The Department of Finance is a key ministry that manages the state finances and economy of Kerala. The department is headed by a senior minister who has cabinet ranking as per Indian Cabinet Protocol Laws. The state assembly rules of 1966 ranks the department and its minister as number 3 in official rankings after Chief Minister and Opposition Leader.

The finance department manages and regulates the state economy and finances through taxation, financial legislation, financial institutions, capital markets, center and state finances, and the State Budget.

industrialists, temple bodies and religious congregations for carrying out economic activities in return for fixed revenue. Prior to forming finance department, it was Pandara (also pronounced as Bhandra Dept- Malayalam name of Revenue dept) managing state finances. When separate finance department was formed to formulate state financial policies, expenditure controls, investment opportunities and controlling fiscal deficits, the tax collection and revenue remained as a separate body itself.

== Functions ==
Major functions of the Finance Department include the following

1. Framing of rules regulating the pay, leave and pension of persons in the service of the Government and rules regulating the number, gradings or cadre and emoluments of posts under the Government and also be responsible for seeing that these rules are properly applied.
2. Finance Department is responsible for all matters relative to financial procedure and the application of the principles of sound finance.
3. Advise on the financial aspect of all transactions relating to loans granted by the Government.
4. Safety and proper employment of Famine Relief Fund and other special funds, if any, and for the administration of Provident Funds, Deposits and Advances.
5. Examine and report on all proposals for the imposition, increase, reduction or abolition of taxes, duties, cesses or fees.
6. Examine and report on all proposals for borrowing or giving of a guarantee by the Government and raise such loans as have been duly authorised, Finance Department shall be in charge of all matters relating to the service of loans or the discharge of guarantees.
7. Ensure that proper financial rules are framed for the guidance of other departments and that suitable accounts, including commercial accounts, whatever necessary, are maintained by other departments and establishments subordinate to them.
8. Prepare an estimate of the total receipts and disbursements of the State in each year and watching the state of the Government's balances and for their ways and means operations.
9. Preparation of Budgets and supplementary estimates.
10. Advise departments responsible for the collection of revenue regarding the progress of collection and methods of collection employed.

== About Department ==
The Department is managed by a senior Minister who has a Cabinet ranking. The Current minister is V.D. Satheesan, the Chief Minister of Kerala. The department is assisted by Finance Secretary and 17 additional secretaries. The Finance Secretary is the senior Indian Administrative Service officer, and has the rank of Additional Chief Secretary to Government.

The Finance Department is headed by the Finance Secretary, who is assisted by the Secretary (Finance Resources) and the Secretary (Finance Expenditure), both Indian Administrative Service (IAS) officers, along with a Special Secretary, 17 Additional Secretaries, the Chief Technical Examiner, 33 Joint Secretaries, 26 Deputy Secretaries, and several Under Secretaries and Section Officers. At the district level, the department has a District Finance Inspection Officer (DFIO) in each of Kerala's 14 districts.

== Sub departments ==
Department of Finance has following sub-divisions;

- Expenditures
- Budget
- Resources

The Following are classified as line departments of Finance Department, in which they have direct control;

- National Savings Department
- Treasuries Department
- Kerala State Audit Department
- Kerala State Insurance Department

The Department of Finance also controls Kerala Financial Corporation, an important agency in leading finance and credit for industrial and agricultural projects for private and public.

Te Finance Department controls the major functions like Budget, Treasuries, Local Fund Audit, Financial Enterprises, State Insurance, etc.

=== Special wings ===
- Finance (Inspection – Non-Technical) Wing – Non-technical financial inspections, audits and examinations of government departments, offices and financial procedures.
- Finance (Inspection – Technical) Wing – Technical inspections of projects and expenditure. Provides technical oversight, inspections and advice on government public works and projects.
- Finance (IT Division) Department – Finance IT and e-governance systems.

== List of Finance Ministers ==
Portrait	Name	Start date	End date	Chief Minister	Party
	C. Achutha Menon	5 April 1957	31 July 1959	E. M. S. Namboodiripad	CPI
	R. Sankar	22 February 1960	26 September 1962	Pattom A. Thanu Pillai	INC
	R. Sankar	26 September 1962	10 September 1964	Himself	INC
	P. K. Kunju	6 March 1967	13 May 1969	E. M. S. Namboodiripad	Praja Socialist Party
	N. K. Seshan	1 November 1969	2 April 1970	C. Achutha Menon	Socialist Party
	K. T. George	25 September 1971	3 April 1972	C. Achutha Menon	INC
	K. G. Adiyodi	16 May 1972	25 December 1975	C. Achutha Menon	INC
	K. M. Mani	26 December 1975	25 March 1977	C. Achutha Menon	Kerala Congress (M)
	M. K. Hemachandran	25 March 1977	27 October 1978	K. Karunakaran / A. K. Antony	INC
	S. Varadarajan Nair	29 October 1978	7 October 1979	P. K. Vasudevan Nair	INC
	N. Bhaskaran Nair	12 October 1979	1 December 1979	C. H. Mohammed Koya	National Democratic Party
	K. M. Mani	25 January 1980	20 October 1981	E. K. Nayanar	Kerala Congress (M)
	K. M. Mani	28 December 1981	17 March 1982	K. Karunakaran	Kerala Congress (M)
	K. M. Mani	24 May 1982	5 June 1986	K. Karunakaran	Kerala Congress (M)
	Thachadi Prabhakaran	5 June 1986	5 March 1987	K. Karunakaran	INC
	V. Viswanatha Menon	2 April 1987	17 June 1991	E. K. Nayanar	CPI(M)
	Oommen Chandy	24 June 1991	22 June 1994	K. Karunakaran	INC
	C. V. Padmarajan	22 June 1994	9 May 1996	K. Karunakaran / A. K. Antony	INC
	T. Sivadasa Menon	20 May 1996	13 May 2001	E. K. Nayanar	CPI(M)
	K. Sankaranarayanan	17 May 2001	29 August 2004	A. K. Antony	INC
	Vakkom Purushothaman	31 August 2004	12 May 2006	Oommen Chandy	INC
	T. M. Thomas Isaac	18 May 2006	16 May 2011	V. S. Achuthanandan	CPI(M)
	K. M. Mani	18 May 2011	10 November 2015	Oommen Chandy	Kerala Congress (M)
	Oommen Chandy	10 November 2015	20 May 2016	Himself	INC
	T. M. Thomas Isaac	25 May 2016	3 May 2021	Pinarayi Vijayan	CPI(M)
	K. N. Balagopal	20 May 2021	17 May 2026	Pinarayi Vijayan	CPI(M)
	V. D. Satheesan	18 May 2026	Incumbent	Himself	INC

== See also ==
- Department of Taxes (Kerala)
- Department of Revenue (Kerala)
- Department of Home (Kerala)

== Sources ==
- http://www.finance.kerala.gov.in (Official Website of the Finance Department, Kerala)
- https://web.archive.org/web/20060118031516/http://www.kerala.gov.in/ (Official website of Govt. of Kerala)
