= Department of Home (Kerala) =

Indian State Government Department

Home Department

Department overview
- Formed: November 1, 1956
- Jurisdiction: Government of Kerala
- Headquarters: Ground Floor, Main Block, Secretariat, Thiruvananthapuram
- Ministers responsible: Ramesh Chennithala, Minister for Home and Vigilance; V.D. Satheesan, Minister for Administration of Justice
- Department executive: K.R. JyothilalIAS, Additional Chief Secretary (Home Department and Vigilance Department)
- Child agencies: Kerala Police; Kerala Prisons and Correctional Services; Kerala Fire And Rescue Services; Directorate of Prosecution
- Website: kerala.gov.in

The Home Department is an administrative department of the Government of Kerala. It plays a key role in maintenance of law and order in the state of Kerala. The department oversees the maintenance of law and order, prevention and control of crime, prosecution of criminals, administration of civil and criminal justice, besides dealing with fire services and prisons administration.

The department is also responsible for the functioning of State Police, Prisons and Correctional Services, Fire and Rescue Services, Civil Defence and Home Guards. The department is also the cadre controlling authority of Kerala Police Service (KPS). The Chief Minister generally serves as the departmental minister, and the Additional Chief Secretary (Home & Vigilance), an IAS officer, is the administrative head of the department. Ramesh Chennithala is the current Home Minister of Kerala.

== Leadership and administration ==
The Home Department is headed by the Minister for Home, who is a political appointee responsible for making policy decisions and providing strategic direction. The minister in charge of the home department is Shri Ramesh Chennithala, the Minister of Home Affairs and Vigilance. The portfolio of Civil and Criminal Justice Administration is generally held by the Chief Minister. Assisting the Minister is the Additional Chief Secretary (Home & Vigilance), a senior IAS officer, also known as Home Secretary, who handles the day-to-day administrative affairs of the department.

The Home Department is organised into 21 sections, namely A, B, C, D, E, F, G, H, J, K, L, M, N, PS, Attestation, SC, SSA, and SSB, each handling specific administrative and functional subjects. Each section is headed by an Additional Secretary, Joint Secretary, Deputy Secretary, or Under Secretary, depending on the nature of work. They are responsible for handling specific subjects such as police administration, prisons, fire and rescue services, prosecution, administration of civil and criminal justice, and internal security.

The hierarchy within the Secretariat is as follows: Additional Chief Secretary (or Principal Secretary), Special Secretary, Additional Secretary, Joint Secretary, Deputy Secretary, Under Secretary, followed by Section Officers and other supporting staff.

== Functions ==
- Law and Order
  - Police
  - Welfare of police personnel
  - Criminal Investigation (Crime Branch)
  - Prosecution including appeals, revision, and withdrawal of prosecution.
    - Directorate of Prosecution; Public Prosecutors and Assistant Public Prosecutors
  - Attrocities against scheduled castes and scheduled tribes
  - Law and order and allied matters in place of public worship.
  - VIP Security
  - Arms, and Ammunition Act
  - Explosives
  - Restriction in use of sound amplifiers.
  - Delhi Special Police Establishment Act (DSPE)
  - TADA (Terrorists and Disruptive Activities (Prevention) Act)
  - Chemical Examiner’s Laboratory
  - Traffic policing and traffic laws
  - Prevention of drug abuse
- Public Safety
  - Internal security
  - Civil defence and Homeguards
  - Fire and Rescue Services
  - Censorship
  - Verification of character and antecedent
  - Licence for construction of cenema theatres
  - Regulation of gambling, betting, installment schemes, and lotteries other than state government lotteries.
  - War Book - Maintenance and Revision
  - Prevention of smuggling and contravention of foreign exchange regulations.
  - Maintenance of communal harmony and peace
- Administration of Civil and Criminal Justice
  - All matters relating to the administration of justice, including civil and criminal law, and the constitution and organisation of courts (except the High Court), as well as matters relating to the offices and staff of the High Court.
  - Motor Accident Claims Tribunals
  - Official receivers.
- Prisons
  - Administration of jails
  - Department of Prisons and Correctional Services
  - Mercy petitions, remission and commutation.
  - Release of prisoners with mental illnesses.
  - Parole for prisoners.
- Foreigners, Passport and Visa, etc
  - Matters related to absconding evacuees and displaced persons from Bangladesh, Pakistan and Sri Lanka.
  - Ban on entry into India by certain foreigners.
  - Extension of stay in India of foreigners
  - Issue of NORI certificates and PCC verification of national status
  - Determination of citizenship status
  - Foreign Contribution (Regulation) Act, 1976
  - Citizenship Act and Foreigners Act

=== Acts and rules administered by the Home Department ===
- Advocates Act
- Arms Act
- Central Industrial Security Force Act
- Cinematograph Act
- Cinema Regulation Act
- Commissions of Inquiry Act, 1952 (interpretation and consultation)
- COFEPOSA
- Dramatic Performances Act
- Essential Services Maintenance Act
- Explosives Act
- Gaming Act
- Habitual Offenders Act
- Internal Security Act
- Indian Soldiers Litigation Act
- Kerala State Civil Services (Safeguarding of National Security) Rules
- Kerala Criminal Law Amendment Act
- Kerala Prisons Act
- National Security Act, 1980
- Petroleum Act, 1934
- Kerala Police Act
- Prevention of Damage to Public Property Act, 1984
- Probation of Offenders Act, 1958
- Prize Competitions Act
- Passports Act, 1967
- SIT Act
- Prevention of Blackmarketing and Maintenance of Supplies of Essential Commodities Act, 1980
- Young Persons (Harmful Publications) Act
- Prevention of Illicit Traffic in Narcotic Drugs and Psychotropic Substances Act, 1988
- Religious Institutions (Prevention of Misuse) Act, 1988
- Kerala Anti-Social Activities (Prevention) Act, 2007

== Child agencies / Directorates ==
The following departments and agencies function under the administrative control of the Home Department:

- Kerala Police: Primary law enforcement agency responsible for law enforcement and maintenance of public order.
- Kerala Prisons and Correctional Services: Administers prisons and oversees prisoner custody, correction and rehabilitation.
- Directorate of Prosecution: Oversees criminal prosecutions on behalf of the state.
- Kerala Fire and Rescue Services: Provides firefighting, rescue and emergency services.
- Kerala Civil Defence and Homeguards: Assists in civil defence, disaster response and emergency operations, and functions under Fire Department.
- Chemical Examiners Laboratory
- Kerala State Forensic Science Laboratory: provides forensic analysis to support criminal investigations.

All these departments are inter-linked and co-ordinated by the Home department.

=== Heads of Departments (HODs) ===
Position	Incumbent	Department	Website
DGP & State Police Chief, Kerala	Ravada Chandrashekhar IPS	Kerala Police	Official website
Director General of Fire and Rescue Services, Civil Defence and Home Guards	Balramkumar Upadya IPS, ADGP	Kerala Fire and Rescue Services	Official website
Director General of Prisons and Correctional Services	S.Sreejith IPS DGP	Kerala Prisons and Correctional Services	Official website
Director General of Prosecution (DGP)	T. Asaf Ali	Directorate of Prosecution	Official website
Chairman and Managing Director	S.Shyamsunder IPS IGP	Kerala Police Housing & Construction Corporation	
Chief Chemical Examiner	Ambily T.S.	Chemical Examiners Laboratory Department	Official website

== Statutory bodies ==
Statutory institutions

- Kerala State Police Complaints Authority (SPCA)
  - District Police Complaints Authorities (DPCAs)

Public sector undertakings

- Kerala Police Housing & Construction Corporation Ltd.

== List of Home ministers of Kerala ==
No.	Portrait	Name	Constituency	Term of office			Party	Ministry
No.	Portrait	Name	Constituency	From	To	Days in office	Party	Ministry
1		V. R. Krishna Iyer	Assembly constituency	5 April 1957	31 July 1959	2 years, 117 days	Independent	First Namboodiripad ministry
2		P. T. Chacko	Meenachil	22 February 1960	20 February 1964	3 years, 363 days	Indian National Congress	Pattom MinistrySankar ministry
3		E. M. S. Namboodiripad (Chief minister)	Pattambi	6 March 1967	1 November 1969	2 years, 240 days	Communist Party of India (Marxist)	Second Namboodiripad ministry
4		C. H. Mohammed Koya	Mankada	01 November 1969	01 August 1970	273 days	Indian Union Muslim League	First C. Achutha Menon ministry
4		C. H. Mohammed Koya	Kondotty	04 October 1970	01 March 1973	2 years, 148 days	Indian Union Muslim League	Second C. Achutha Menon ministry
5		K. Karunakaran	Mala	25 September 1971	25 March 1977		Indian National Congress	Second C. Achutha Menon ministry
6		K. M. Mani	Pala	25 March 1977	21 December 1977		Kerala Congress	First Karunakaran ministry First Antony ministry
7		P. J. Joseph	Thodupuzha	4 January 1978	26 September 1978		Kerala Congress	First Antony ministry
8		K. M. Mani	Pala	4 October 1978	26 July 1979		Kerala Congress	P. K. Vasudevan Nair ministry
9		C. H. Mohammed Koya (Chief minister)	Malappuram	12 October 1979	1 December 1979	50 days	Indian Union Muslim League	Koya ministry
10		T. K. Ramakrishnan		25 January 1980	20 October 1981	1 year, 268 days	Communist Party of India (Marxist)	First Nayanar ministry
11		Oommen Chandy	Puthuppally	28 December 1981	17 March 1982	79 days	Indian National Congress	Second Karunakaran ministry
12		Vayalar Ravi	Cherthala	24 May 1982	24 May 1986	4 years	Indian National Congress	Third Karunakaran ministry
13		E. K. Nayanar (Chief minister)	Thrikaripur	26 March 1987	24 June 1991	4 years, 90 days	Communist Party of India (Marxist)	Second Nayanar ministry
14		K. Karunakaran (Chief minister)	Mala	24 June 1991	22 March 1995	3 years, 271 days	Indian National Congress	Fourth Karunakaran ministry
15		A.K. Antony (Chief minister)	Tirurangadi	22 March 1995	20 May 1996	1 year, 59 days	Indian National Congress	Second Antony ministry
16		E. K. Nayanar (Chief minister)	Thalassery	20 May 1996	17 May 2001	4 years, 362 days	Communist Party of India (Marxist)	Third Nayanar ministry
17		A. K. Antony (Chief minister)	Cherthala	17 May 2001	31 August 2004	3 years, 106 days	Indian National Congress	Third Antony ministry
19		Oommen Chandy (Chief minister)	Puthuppally	31 August 2004	18 May 2006	1 year, 260 days	Indian National Congress	First Chandy ministry
20		Kodiyeri Balakrishnan	Thalassery	18 May 2006	16 May 2011	4 years, 363 days	Communist Party of India (Marxist)	Achuthanandan ministry
		Oommen Chandy (Chief minister)	Puthuppally	18 May 2011	12 April 2012	330 days	Indian National Congress	Second Chandy ministry
21		Thiruvanchoor Radhakrishnan	Kottayam	12 April 2012	31 December 2013	1 year, 263 days	Indian National Congress	Second Chandy ministry
22		Ramesh Chennithala	Haripad	1 January 2014	25 May 2016	2 years, 145 days	Indian National Congress	Second Chandy ministry
23		Pinarayi Vijayan (Chief minister)	Dharmadom	25 May 2016	3 May 2021	9 years, 358 days	Communist Party of India (Marxist)	First Vijayan ministry
23		Pinarayi Vijayan (Chief minister)	Dharmadom	20 May 2021	18 May 2026	9 years, 358 days	Communist Party of India (Marxist)	Second Vijayan ministry
24		Ramesh Chennithala	Haripad	18 May 2026	Incumbent	5 months and 15 days	Indian National Congress	Satheesan ministry

== See also ==
- Department of Vigilance (Kerala)
- Department of Finance (Kerala)
- Department of Revenue (Kerala)
