= Department of Revenue (Kerala) =

Government department of Kerala

Revenue Department Government of Kerala

Department overview
- Formed: 1811
- Jurisdiction: Kerala
- Headquarters: Thiruvananthapuram
- Annual budget: ₹1,178.7527 crore (US$120 million) (2026–27, revised)
- Minister responsible: A.P. Anil Kumar, Minister for Land Revenue, Land Reforms, Survey and Land records
- Department executive: M.G. Rajamanickam, IAS, Principal Secretary (Revenue)
- Child agencies: Land Bank of Kerala; Commissionerate of Land Revenue; Directorate of Survey and Land Records; Institute of Land and Disaster Management
- Website: clr.kerala.gov.in/eng/

The Department of Land Revenue or Revenue Department is a government department under Government of Kerala that manages all government owned lands and decides land use policies in the Indian state of Kerala. The department is also a government agency, deriving various taxes on land, as well as lease amounts from various government lands, which are principal sources of income for the Government. In addition, the department manages land-use policy, survey of land areas, and effective management and implementation of land reforms.

It is the largest department under the Government of Kerala, with more than 19000 employees and is also known as the Mother of All Departments.

== Leadership ==
The Revenue Department is headed by a senior cabinet minister, known as Minister for Revenue. The incumbent Minister is A. P. Anil Kumar.

At the administrative level, the department is headed by a senior IAS officer serving as the Additional Chief Secretary or Principal Secretary to the Government. The revenue secretary is assisted by additional secretaries, joint secretaries, deputy secretaries and under secretaries at the secretariat.

At the field level, the Commissioner of Land Revenue, the Director of Surveys and Land Records, and other heads of field agencies oversee their respective administrations. The Commissioner of Land Revenue, an officer of the Indian Administrative Service (IAS) cadre, functions as the Head of the Department and supervises revenue administration at various levels, such as district collectorate.

== Sub-divisions ==
- Land
- Distress Relief
- Devaswom & Religious Endowments
  - Devaswom Boards
- Other matters
  - Revenue recovery
  - Bhoodan
  - Legislation on agricultural debt relief
  - Public Accountants Act
  - Rain gauge
  - Kerala Requisition and Acquisition of Property Act, 1956
  - State Names Authority
  - Issues relating to Kerala Building Tax Act

== Sub-departments ==
- Commissionerate of Land Revenue
- Directorate of Survey and Land Records
- The State Land Board

Institute of Land and Disaster Management is an autonomous body that provides training to members of the department.

== Commissionerate of Land Revenue ==
The Land Revenue Commissionerate, which functions under the Revenue Department of the Government of Kerala and is headed by the Land Revenue Commissioner, serves as the headquarters of the Land Revenue Department. It has its headquarters in Thiruvananthapuram. It is the main operational wing of the Revenue Department, tasked with the protection and maintenance of government lands; the collection of land tax and plantation tax; the maintenance of land records; election-related duties; disaster management; maintenance of law and order; and the issuance of various licenses and certificates.

For this purpose, the department is organised into 14 districts, 27 revenue divisions, 78 taluks, and 1,666 revenue villages. Each of the 14 districts has a Collectorate headed by the District Collector; each revenue division is headed by a Revenue Divisional Officer (RDO); each taluk is headed by a Tehsildar; and each revenue village is administered by a Village Officer.
The district collectors of various districts reports to land revenue commissioner of the state.

=== Other agencies under Land Revenue Department ===
- Kerala Land Board
- Institute of Landand Disaster Management (ILDM)

== Directorate of Survey and Land Records ==
The Directorate of Survey and Land Records, Kerala is the department responsible for land surveys and maintenance of land records in Kerala, supporting revenue administration and land management. It has its headquarters in Thiruvananthapuram. The department is headed by a Director (IAS), and is assisted by Additional Directors, Joint Directors, and Deputy Directors.

The department consists of three wings: the Field Wing (Surveyors and Head Surveyors), the Office Wing (Draftsmen and Head Draftsmen), and the Administrative Wing.

== List of Revenue Ministers ==
K. M. Mani is the longest-serving Revenue Minister in Kerala, followed by Baby John as the second longest-serving.
The following is the list of ministers who held the portfolio of land revenue in various ministries:

Sl. No.	Minister	Term	Party	Chief Minister
1	K. R. Gowri Amma	1957–1959	CPI	E. M. S. Namboodiripad
2	K. Chandrasekharan	1960–1962	PSP	Pattom A. Thanu Pillai
3	K. Chandrasekharan	Sep 1962 – Oct 1962	PSP	R. Sankar
4	T. A. Thomman	2 Mar 1964 – 10 Sep 1964	INC	R. Sankar
5	K. R. Gowri Amma	1967–1969	CPI(M)	E. M. S. Namboodiripad
6	K. T. Jacob	1969–1970	CPI	C. Achutha Menon
7	Baby John	1970–1977	RSP	C. Achutha Menon
8	Baby John	25 Mar 1977 – 25 Apr 1977	RSP	K. Karunakaran
9	Baby John	1977–1978	RSP	A. K. Antony
10	Baby John	1978–1979	RSP	P. K. Vasudevan Nair
11	K. J. Chacko	12 Oct 1979 – 1 Dec 1979	Kerala Congress	C. H. Mohammed Koya
12	P. S. Sreenivasan	1980–1981	CPI	E. K. Nayanar
13	P. J. Joseph	1981–1982	Kerala Congress	K. Karunakaran
14	P. J. Joseph	1982–1987	Kerala Congress	K. Karunakaran
15	P. S. Sreenivasan	1987–1991	CPI	E. K. Nayanar
16	K. M. Mani	1991–1995	Kerala Congress (M)	K. Karunakaran
17	K. M. Mani	1995–1996	Kerala Congress (M)	A. K. Antony
18	K. E. Ismail	1996–2001	CPI	E. K. Nayanar
19	K. M. Mani	2001–2004	Kerala Congress (M)	A. K. Antony
20	K. M. Mani	2004–2006	Kerala Congress (M)	Oommen Chandy
21	K. P. Rajendran	2006–2011	CPI	V. S. Achuthanandan
22	Adoor Prakash	2011–2016	INC	Oommen Chandy
23	E. Chandrasekharan	2016–2021	CPI	Pinarayi Vijayan
24	K. Rajan	2021–2026	CPI	Pinarayi Vijayan
25	A. P. Anil Kumar	2026-	INC	V. D. Satheesan

== Controversies ==
The Revenue Department has frequently faced allegations of corruption. According to information obtained under the RTI Act, 42 of the 151 government employees arrested by the Vigilance and Anti-Corruption Bureau (VACB) between January 2017 and July 2022 belonged to the Revenue Department, the highest among state departments. Revenue officials also topped the list of government employees arrested by the VACB for the last five years.

== See also ==
- Department of Finance (Kerala)
- Department of Taxes (Kerala)
- Department of Home (Kerala)
