= K. T. George =

Indian politician

Member of the Kerala Legislative Assembly
- In office 1965–1972
- Preceded by: K. A. Damodara Menon
- Succeeded by: Xavier Arakkal
- Constituency: Paravur

Minister for Finance, Government of Kerala
- In office 1971 September 25 – 1972 April 3
- Preceded by: N. K. Seshan
- Succeeded by: K. G. Adiyodi

Minister of Law, Government of Kerala
- In office 1971 September 25 – 1972 April 3

Personal details
- Born: 20 July 1929 British India
- Died: 3 April 1972 (aged 42) Thiruvananthapuram, Kerala, India
- Spouse: Saramma George
- Children: 3

K. T. George was a lawyer and politician from Kerala, India. He represented Paravur Assembly constituency as an Indian National Congress representative in the third and fourth Kerala Legislative Assemblies.

== Biography ==
Born July 20, 1929, K. T. George was survived by his wife, Saramma George. The couple had three daughters. He was a lawyer by profession.

While speaking in the Kerala Legislative Assembly as the Law Minister, on April 5, 1972, he collapsed and died soon after.

== Political career ==
George, who was a criminal lawyer from Paravur, entered public service in 1954 as an active member of the Indian National Congress. Later he was selected member of Kerala Pradesh Congress Committee and All India Congress Committee. He was first elected from Paravur in 1965. However no single party could form a ministry commanding majority and hence this election was considered abortive. On March 25, President's rule was invoked in the state for the fourth time. He later won the 1967 elections from Paravur and became a member of the Third Kerala Legislative Assembly. During this period he was also served as the Chief Whip of the Congress Legislative Party. He again won the 1970 elections from Paravur. During this period he was the Chairman of the Estimates Committee from 1970 to 1971 and the Deputy Leader of the Congress Legislative Party.

From September 25, 1971, till his death he served as the Kerala state Minister for finance and Minister of Law.
