= P. K. Kunju =

Former Finance Minister of Kerala

Minister for Finance, Government of Kerala
- In office 6 March 1967 – 13 May 1969
- Preceded by: R. Sankar
- Succeeded by: N. K. Seshan

Minister for Labour, Medical and Local Bodies of Travancore-Cochin
- In office 1954–1955

Member of Sree Moolam Popular Assembly
- In office 1937–1947

Member of Travancore Legislative Assembly
- In office 1948–1949

Member of Travancore-Cochin Legislative Assembly
- In office 1954–1955

Member of Kerala Legislative Assembly
- In office 1967–1969
- Constituency: Krishnapuram

Member of Kerala Legislative Assembly
- In office 1969–1970
- Constituency: Kayamkulam

Personal details
- Born: 1906
- Died: 24 June 1979 (aged 72–73)
- Party: Praja Socialist Party (from 1953)
- Other political affiliations: Indian National Congress (Until 1940)
- As of 17 October, 2022 Source: Kerala Niyamasabha

P. K. Kunju (1906 – 24 June 1979) was a politician from Kerala, India. He was a long-time Member of Legislative Assembly. He was Kerala finance minister from 1967 to 1969. He was a member of the Sree Moolam Assembly in 1937, the Travancore Legislative Assembly in 1948-49 and the Thiru-kochi Assembly in 1954. He was elected to the 2nd Kerala Legislative Assembly as a Praja Socialist Party representative from Krishnapuram and the 3rd Legislative Assembly as a Samyukta Socialist Party candidate from Kayamkulam. The Kerala State Lottery was established when he was the finance minister.

== Life ==
He was born in 1906. He studied up to intermediate level. He died on 24 June 1979.

== Political career ==
Kunju started his political career as a member of Indian National Congress. He was active in the Indian Independence Movement and took part in the Vaikom Satyagraha social movement. Before Indian independence, he was elected to the Sree Moolam Popular Assembly of Travancore from 1937 to 1947. After independence he was elected a member of Travancore Assembly from 1948 to 1949. During his term, he was the whip of the parliamentary party of All Travancore Joint political Congress. He was later elected to the Travancore-Cochin Legislative Assembly in 1954, and during his term he was the minister for labour, medical and local bodies.

Kunju resigned from Congress in 1940 and joined the Praja Socialist Party in 1953. He was elected to the 2nd Kerala Legislative Assembly as a Praja Socialist Party representative from Krishnapuram and the 3rd Legislative Assembly as a Samyuktha Socialist Party candidate from Kayamkulam. In the Second E. M. S. Namboodiripad ministry, from 6 March 1967 to 13 May 1969, he was finance minister.

Kunju was the chief editor of the Malayalam language weeklies Rajyabhimani and Swaraj and the Malayalam daily Kerala Janata. He was the founder of M.S.M. Arts and Science College in Kayamkulam.

=== Kerala State Lotteries ===
The Kerala State Lottery was established when he was finance minister. He had earlier experience of conducting lotteries as chairman of Kayamkulam MSM Trust. The first prize of the lottery held in July 1967 to raise funds for MSM College was 20,000 rupees or a Hindustan Ambassador car.

== Legacy ==
The P.K.Kunju Sahib Memorial Taluk Hospital and PK Kunju Sahib Memorial Higher Secondary School in Kayamkulam are named after him.

There is also an Ayurvedic hospital, in Kayamkulam under his name.
