= Goonda =

Indian term for criminals and gangsters

"Goonda" is a term used in the Indian subcontinent for hired criminals and gangsters. It is both a colloquial term and defined and used in laws, generally referred to as Goonda Acts.

== Etymology ==
The word possibly comes from the Hindi word guṇḍā (Hindi: गुंडा, "rascal"). There is also the identically-spelled Marathi word with a similar meaning, attested as early as the 17th century, and possibly ultimately having Dravidian roots. Another theory suggests that it originates from the English word "goon". However, the first English-language appearance of "goonda" (in British newspapers of the 1920s, with the spelling "goondah") predates the use of "goon" to mean criminal, a semantic change which seems to go back only as far as the 1930s comic strip character Alice the Goon. Related terms are goonda-gardi, goondagiri, gundai and goondaism roughly meaning bully-boy tactics, gang violence or gang warfare. Another is goonda tax, referring to money extorted in a protection racket. Another term is goonda raj (literally: 'goonda regime') which refers to a criminalized nexus (or "mafia") of government officials, elected politicians, business interests and other entities (such as law-enforcement authorities, non-governmental organization, trade unions and criminal organizations).

== Definitions ==
Many legislative bodies have passed "Goonda Acts" (a colloquial name, due to the long titles) providing legal definitions of who constitutes a "goonda". Some of these laws permit harsh treatment such as giving the police the power to shoot them on sight.

=== Bangladesh ===
Bangladesh's Control of Disorderly and Dangerous Persons (Goondas) Act (East Bengal Act IV of 1954), Section 13(1), gives seven grounds under which a tribunal may declare a person to be a goonda and place him on the prescribed list of goondas:

1. frequents for immoral purposes houses or localities inhabited by prostitutes; or
2. frequents resorts of vice such as drinking or gambling dens, or places where opium or other intoxicating drugs are smoked or otherwise consumed; or
3. generally appears in public while drunk; or
4. is addicted to smoking opium; or
5. uses obscene or abusive language in public; or
6. makes fraudulent collection in the name of charity;
7. is involved in affray, rowdyism or acts of intimidation or violence in any place private or public so as to cause alarm to the people living or frequenting the neighbourhood

Section 13(2) additionally establishes the category of "dangerous goonda", giving more than twenty further grounds on which a tribunal may declare a person to be a dangerous goonda, mostly related to violence, prostitution, and forgery, or offences committed by a person previously declared a goonda under the Act. Per Section 14, goondas may be required to post a bond, and may be restricted from entering gambling houses; dangerous goondas may have much broader restrictions placed on their freedom of movement, and per Section 18 also may have enhanced punishment imposed on them for future offences.

=== India ===
Many states of India have enacted special laws to deal with goondas.

==== Madhya Pradesh ====
Madhya Pradesh once had a goonda act in force, known as the Central Provinces and Berar Goondas Act (Act X of 1946), amended by Act XLIX of 1950. However it was struck down in 1960 in the Supreme Court of India case State of Madhya Pradesh vs. Baldeo Prasad. The court held that "the definition of a goonda laid down by the Act, which is of an inclusive character, indicated no tests for deciding whether the person fell within the first part of the definition".

==== Uttar Pradesh ====
The Uttar Pradesh Control of Goondas Act (U.P. Act No. 8 of 1971, amended by U.P. Act No. 1 of 1985) Section 2(b) defines a goonda as a person who:

1. either by himself or as a member or leader of a gang, habitually commits or attempts to commit, or abets the commission of an offence punishable under Section 153 or Section 153-B or Section 294 of the Indian Penal Code or Chapter XV, Chapter XVI, Chapter XVII or Chapter XXII of the said Code; or
2. has been convicted for an offence punishable under the Suppression of Immoral Traffic in Women and Girls Act, 1956; or
3. has been convicted not less than thrice for an offence punishable under the U.P. Excise Act, 1910 or the Public Gambling Act, 1867 or Section 25, Section 27 or Section 29 of the Arms Act, 1959; or
4. is generally reputed to be a person who is desperate and dangerous to the community; or
5. has been habitually passing indecent remarks or teasing women or girls; or
6. is a tout; or
7. is a house-grabber.

Section 3 gives the district magistrate the power to order a goonda in writing to remove himself from a jurisdiction, or to report his movements, for periods of up to six months.

==== Rajasthan ====
The Rajasthan Control of Goondas Act (Act No. 14 of 1975), in Section 2(b) defines who is a "goonda" for purposes of the Act. Like the similar act in Uttar Pradesh, it provided that goondas may be ordered to leave the district ("externment") for up to six months. However, the Rajasthan High Court struck down the externment provisions as unconstitutional in 2001. In particular, the Court pointed out that a person imprisoned had to be provided with a residential accommodation and subsistence at the expense of the state government, whereas the Control of Goondas Act made no provision for a goonda under externment to be provided with residential accommodation, putting him in a comparatively worse situation than a prisoner; this was held to violate the right to life guaranteed under Article 21 of the Constitution of India.

==== Tamil Nadu ====
The Tamil Nadu Prevention of Dangerous Activities of Bootleggers, Drug-offenders, Forest-offenders, Goondas, Immoral Traffic Offenders, Slum-grabbers and Video Pirates Act (Tamil Nadu Act 14 of 1982; "Video Pirates" was added by Act 32 of 2004), Section 2(f) states "goonda means a person, who either by himself or as a member of or leader of a gang habitually commits, or attempts to commit or abets the commission of offence, punishable under Chapter XVI or Chapter XVII or Chapter XXII of the Indian Penal Code (Central Act XLV of 1860)". According to a 2011 ruling of the Madras High Court, even a single offense under the Act permits detention of a person as a goonda.

==== Karnataka ====
The Karnataka Prevention of Dangerous Activities of Bootleggers, Drug-Offenders, Gamblers, Goondas, Immoral Traffic Offenders and Slum-Grabbers Act (Act 12 of 1985), as amended by Act 16 of 2001, in Section 2(g) states "goonda means a person who either by himself or as a member of or leader of a gang, habitually commits or attempts to commit or abets the commission of offences punishable under Chapter VIII, Chapter XV, Chapter XVI, Chapter XVII or Chapter XXII of the Indian Penal Code (Central Act XLV of 1860)". In 2014 the Government of Karnataka brought most offences under the Information Technology Act, 2000, and Indian Copyright Act, 1957, under the ambit of the Goonda Act. Until now, people with a history of offences like bootlegging, drug offences and immoral trafficking could be taken into preventive custody. But the government, in its enthusiasm, while adding acid attackers and sexual predators to the law, has also added 'digital offenders', meaning "any person who knowingly or deliberately violates, for commercial purposes, any copyright law in relation to any book, music, film, software, artistic or scientific work and also includes any person who illegally enters through the identity of another user and illegally uses any computer or digital network for pecuniary gain for himself or any other person or commits any of the offences specified under sections 67, 68, 69, 70, 71, 72, 73, 74 and 75 of the Information Technology Act, 2000".

==== Kerala ====
The Kerala Anti-Social Activities Prevention Act (Act 34 of 2007), Section 2(j), states "goonda means a person who indulges in any anti-social activity or promotes or abets any illegal activity which are harmful for the maintenance of the public order directly or indirectly and includes a bootlegger, a counterfeiter, a depredator of environment, a digital data and copyright pirate, a drug offender, a hawala racketeer, a hired ruffian, rowdy, an immoral traffic offender, a loan shark or a property grabber".

=== Pakistan ===
==== Punjab ====
The Punjab Control of Goondas Ordinance (W.P. Ordinance XXXV of 1959), Section 13, establishes a list of more than twenty offences (mostly related to violence, public drunkenness, sexual crimes, and habitual counterfeiting or smuggling) under which a tribunal may declare a person a "goonda" and place his name on the prescribed list of goondas, after which he may be subject to enhanced punishment for any future offenses. It overrode the earlier Punjab Control of Goondas Act (Act XIV of 1951).
