= Cholakkulam =

- Village
- Location in Kerala, India Cholakkulam (India)
- Coordinates: 11.072096°N 76.266885°E
- Country: India
- State: Kerala
- District: Malappuram

Languages
  - Official: Malayalam, English
- Time zone: UTC+5:30 (IST)
- PIN: 679326
- Telephone code: 04933
- Vehicle registration: KL-53

Cholakkulam is a village in Malappuram district of Kerala. It is situated in Melattur. The name Cholakkulam came from the Malayalam words 'Chola' (Stream), 'Kulam' (Pond); i.e., 'Place where there is a pond with a stream'. The village is well connected to Perinthalmanna (17 km), Mannarkkad (24 km), Manjeri (23 km) and Karuvarakundu (11 km). The shortest route connecting Kozhikode with Palakkad (via Manjeri - Pandikkad - Melattur - Mannarkkad, 134 km) passes through this village.

== Facilities ==
Basically nearby town is melattur, buses passing are available to Kozhikode, Mannarkkad, Palakkad, Kalikavu, Nilambur, Edathanattukara and Thrissur.

The Shoranur-Nilambur Railway Line passes through Cholakkulam, with all trains stopping in Melattur. Trains to Palakkad, Ernakulam, and Thiruvananthapuram will be available from here. In terms of education, a government-aided Lower Primary School is situated in Cholakkulam. Government owned KSEB Substation is situated here. Cholakkulam is the meeting place for the village folks. Golden City is the center point of Cholakkulam and grocery stores, bakeries and snack shops are situated here. Additionally, Cholakkulam hosts semi industrial activities, including metal and wood fabrication, timber processing and merchandising of rubber and coconut. The population is highly educated, with many residents employed in Government, Semi-Government organizations and Middle East countries, etc. A government affiliated library named Anaswara Vayanashala runs here with active involvement in the cultural and sport activity promotion.

== Culture ==
Cholakkulam village is a predominantly Muslim populated area. Hindus exist in comparatively smaller numbers. So the culture of the locality is based upon Muslim traditions. Duff Muttu, Kolkali and Aravanamuttu are common folk arts of this locality. There are many libraries attached to mosques giving a rich source of Islamic studies. Most of the books are written in Arabi-Malayalam which is a version of the Malayalam language written in Arabic script. People gather in mosques for the evening prayer and continue to sit there after the prayers discussing social and cultural issues. Business and family issues are also sorted out during these evening meetings. The Hindu minority of this area keeps their rich traditions by celebrating various festivals in their temples. Hindu rituals are done here with a regular devotion like other parts of Kerala.

== Transportation ==
Cholakkulam village connects to other parts of India through Perinthalmanna town. National highway No. 66 passes through Tirur and the northern stretch connects to Goa and Mumbai. The southern stretch connects to Cochin and Trivandrum. Highway No. 966 goes to Palakkad and Coimbatore. The nearest airport is at Kozhikode. The nearest major railway station is at Shoranur Junction railway station.
