= KSLB =

KSLB may refer to:

- Kerala State Land Bank
- Storm Lake Municipal Airport in Storm Lake, Iowa, United States
