= K. A. Damodara Menon =

Indian freedom fighter and politician

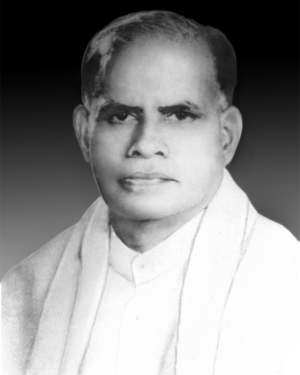

Minister of Industries, Government of Kerala
- In office February 22, 1960 – September 10, 1964
- Preceded by: K. P. Gopalan
- Succeeded by: T. V. Thomas

Minister of Local Self Government, Government of Kerala
- In office September 26, 1962 – September 10, 1964
- Succeeded by: M. P. M. Ahammed Kurikkal

Member of Parliament (Lok sabha)
- In office April 17, 1952 – April 4, 1957
- Succeeded by: K. P. Kutti Krishnan Nair
- Constituency: Kozhikode

Member of the Kerala Legislative Assembly
- In office February 9, 1960 – September 10, 1964
- Preceded by: N. Sivan Pillai
- Succeeded by: K. T. George
- Constituency: Paravur

Personal details
- Born: June 10, 1906 Karumalloor, Cochin Kingdom, British India
- Died: November 1, 1980 (aged 74)
- Party: Indian National Congress
- Spouse: Leela Damodara Menon
- Children: 4 Dr. V.K Ravindran, V.K. Harindran
- Parents: T. R. Achuthan Pillai (father); Nangu Amma (mother)

Kalappurakkal Achutha Damodara Menon (1906-1980) was an Indian National Congress politician, minister, journalist, writer, freedom fighter and an activist in the movement for united Kerala. He was elected to the Provincial Parliament in 1950 and Indian Parliament (lok sabha) from Kozhikode (Madras State) as a representative of Kisan Mazdoor Praja Party, in 1952. During his term as a member of Kerala Legislative Assembly, he served as the Minister for Industries and Local Administration.

== Biography ==
K. A. Damodara Menon was born on June 10, 1906, the son of T. R. Achuthan Pillai of the Thazhathuveettil house, and Nangu Amma of the Kalappurakkal house at Karumalloor in present-day Ernakulam district of Kerala.

After primary education Menon joined Paravur High School. Damodaran's father, Achuthan, died while he was still a schoolboy. He came to Thiruvananthapuram with his elder brother Parameswaran, who got a government job in Thiruvananthapuram at that time; and continued his schooling at SMV High School, Thiruvananthapuram. During this time he became attracted towards the national independence movement and the thoughts of Mahatma Gandhi. When Raghavaya, the then Diwan of Travancore decided to increase school fees, he took part in the student protest against the fees hike. He passed the matriculation examination in 1922 and completed his college education in Thiruvananthapuram itself. In 1926 he received his B.A. Graduation.

On June 12, 1941, Damodara Menon married Leela Damodara Menon, who later became active in Kerala politics. The couple have four children. He died on November 1, 1980.

== Career and activism ==
=== Abroad and Return ===
After completing his education, Damodara Menon worked at the Devaswom Commissioner's Office for a short time and then moved to Burma (Myanmar) in search of a better career. He got a job as a clerk in the Accountant General's office in Burma. He later became a teacher at Kelly High School in Mandalay. A year later he joined a teacher training course at the University of Rangoon. After completing DT (Diploma in Teaching), he worked for a year as a teacher at a government school in Pyapon, southern Burma. For participating in the freedom struggle in Kerala, he quit his job and returned home. On the way back, he observed the freedom struggle in Kolkata, Bihar, Surat, Mumbai and other important centers of India.

=== Congress party ===
On the day he reached Palakkad in 1930, Damodara Menon was arrested at the Congress convention venue and lodged in the Palakkad sub-jail. Two weeks later he was sentenced to nine months' imprisonment and transferred to the Central Jail in Coimbatore and from there to the Bellary Camp Jail. After his release from prison, he returned to full-time politics. He was arrested and sentenced to six months imprisonment at jails in Kozhikode and Kannur, for violating a government ban and speaking at a public meeting at Kozhikode Beach. While in prison, he authored the book Rashtra Vijnanam. After his release, Menon and his accomplices were again arrested by the police and lodged in the Alipore Jail in Calcutta. In the Gandhian and Socialist sections of the Congress organization in Kerala at that time, Damodara Menon was a follower of Gandhian ideology. Menon was also involved in activities related to the labor movement.

When a faction called the Democratic Front emerged in the Congress, Damodar Menon joined them. Acharya Kripalani was the leader of this sect. This faction later became a new political party, the Kisan Mazdoor Praja Party. Damodar Menon has been elected Parliamentary Secretary of the party. He left the Kisan Mazdoor Praja Party and returned to the Congress in 1955.

As a member of Congress party, Damodara Menon served as the secretary of Kerala Pradesh Congress Committee (KPCC) from 1930 to 1932 and 1948 to 1949; treasurer of the KPCC from 1945 to 1947; president of KPCC in 1957 and member of the All India Congress Committee (AICC) from 1948 to 1949 and 1950 to 1951.

=== Journalism ===
By 1933, the Indian National Congress had decided to stop violating the law and focus on the legislature. During this time Damodara Menon took a break from public career and joined the Law College, Thiruvananthapuram to study law. His relationship with journalist Kesari Balakrishna Pillai helped him to train in journalism. After graduating in law, Menon took up law practice in Thiruvananthapuram. During this time he took over the editorship of the weekly Samadarshi and also wrote in Kesari newspaper. In 1937, Damodar Menon became the editor of Mathrubhumi.

The Morazha incident that occurred in Malabar in the 1940s took place when he was the editor of Mathrubhumi. A police inspector has been killed in a dispute over a farmers' union meeting. On February 27, 1942, Mathrubhumi wrote an introductory speech calling for the saving of the life of K. P. R. Gopalan, a Communist leader who had been sentenced to death in this case. On March 5, KPR day was observed all over Kerala. Following the intervention of Nehru and Gandhi, the death penalty was commuted to life imprisonment. Following this, Mathrubhumi was banned. In 1948 he resigned from the editorial board of Mathrubhumi.

=== Indian independence movement ===
Damodara Menon served as the Secretary of the Thiruvithamkoor Samarasahaya Committee (Travancore Struggle Assistance Committee) formed in Kozhikode to assist in the struggle for responsible governance in Travancore. He also took an active part in the Indian independence movement and was arrested in 1942 in connection with the Quit India Movement and was lodged in the Vellore and Amravati jails. He was imprisoned until June 1945. After his release, he continued to work in Mathrubhumi.

=== Aikya Kerala Movement ===
Damodara Menon has advocated for a united Kerala, organized many meetings and has written extensively for it. He was also a member of the committee formed in September 1946, by KPCC to form a Joint Committee for the implementation of United Kerala and to take other practical steps, in consultation with various political parties in Malabar, Kochi and Travancore. Based on this, a meeting was held on October 26, 1946 at Cheruthuruthy under the chairmanship of K. P. Kesava Menon. After Indian independence, the Aikya Kerala Convention held at Aluva in 1948, appointed an Action Committee of 15 members with K. Kelappan as the President and Damodara Menon as the Secretary.

=== Electoral politics ===
Damodara Menon was elected to the Provincial Parliament of India in 1950. As a representative of Kisan Mazdoor Praja Party, in 1952, he became a Member of Parliament from Kozhikode (Madras). In the first elections to the Kerala Legislative Assembly in 1957, Menon contested from Perumbavoor and his wife Leela from Kundamangalam, in which he lost and his wife won. In the second Kerala Assembly elections of 1960, Menon contested from Paravur and his wife Leela from Kunnamkulam, as an Indian National Congress candidate, and both of whom won. As a member of the second Kerala Legislative Assembly representing Paravur, he also served as the Minister for Industries from February 2, 1960 to September 26, 1962 and Minister for Industries and Local Administration from September 26, 1962 to September 10, 1964.

=== Others ===
Representative from Kerala to the All India Kisan Mazdoor Sangh and General Secretary of the United Kerala Conference (1947) in Thrissur. When Kerala Press Academy was formed in 1979, Damodara Menon was appointed its first Chairman.

== Literary works ==
- Thoppile Nidhi (meaning: Treasure in the garden)
- Alasa Velakal (meaning: Lazy times)
- Raashtra Vijnjanam (meaning: Political Science)
- Bhavanaasoonam (meaning: Imagination)
- Narma kathakal (meaning: Humorous stories) (two parts)
- Balaramam
- Thirinju Nokkumpol (meaning: Looking back) (autobiography)
