= Directorate of Prosecution (Kerala) =

Prosecution agency of the Government of Kerala, India

Directorate of Prosecution, Kerala
- പ്രോസീക്യൂഷൻ ഡയറക്ടറേറ്റ്, കേരളം

Agency overview
- Formed: 2000
- Jurisdiction: Kerala
- Headquarters: Ernakulam, Kerala
- Agency executives: T. Asaf Ali, Director General of Prosecution (DGP); Vacant, Director of Prosecution (Administration)
- Parent department: Department of Home, Government of Kerala
- Website: https://prosecution.kerala.gov.in

Directorate of Prosecution is the prosecuting agency of Government of Kerala, and under administrative control of Home Department, Government of Kerala. The key function of the Directorate is to streamline the conduct of prosecution, for and on behalf of the State, before the Courts and to monitor and supervise the Prosecutors working in various sub-ordinate Courts in the State. The key responsibility of the Directorate is to supervise and streamline the work of prosecution machinery of the state. The Directorate of Prosecution is headed by the Director General of Prosecution, The DGP is assisted by Director of Prosecution, Deputy Directors of Prosecution, Assistant Directors of Prosecution and Public Prosecutors. The Directorate of Prosecution is headquartered in Ernakulam, the judicial capital of Kerala.
T. Asaf Ali is the current Director General of Prosecution of Kerala.

== Overview ==
The Directorate of Prosecution is established in 2000 and it is headed by the Director General of Prosecution. He is assisted by a Director of Prosecution (Admn). The directorate is under administrative control of the Department of Home. the Department of Home is headed by the Additional Chief Secretary (Home).

=== organizational structure ===
- Additional Chief Secretary (Home & Vigilance)
- Director General of Prosecution (DGP) [Head of the department and also State Public Prosecutor]
- Director of Prosecution (Administration)
- Deputy Director of Prosecution and District Public Prosecutor and Government Pleader
- Public Prosecutor and Government Pleader
- Assistant Public Prosecutor and Government Pleader

== See also ==
- Advocate general (India)
- Advocate general
- Department of Home (Kerala)
