= Leela Damodara Menon =

Indian politician (1923–1995)

Member of Parliament, Rajya Sabha
- In office 1974-1980
- Constituency: Kerala

Member of the Kerala Legislative Assembly
- In office 1987–1991
- Preceded by: K. E. Ismail
- Succeeded by: K. E. Ismail
- Constituency: Pattambi
- In office March 16, 1957 – September 10, 1964
- Succeeded by: V. Kuttikrishnan Nair
- Constituency: Kunnamangalam

Personal details
- Born: 4 January 1923
- Died: 10 October 1995 (aged 72)
- Party: Indian National Congress
- Spouse: K. A. Damodara Menon
- Children: 4 Dr. V.K. Ravindran, V.K. Harindran

Leela Damodara Menon (Malayalam: [l̪iːl̪aː d̪aːmoːd̪ɐɾ̪ɐ meːn̪oːn̪]; 4 January 1923 – 10 October 1995) was an Indian politician. She was a Member of Parliament, representing Kerala in the Rajya Sabha the upper house of India's Parliament as a member of the Indian National Congress.

== Biography ==
Leela was born on January 4, 1923, the daughter of K. U. Krishnan Nair.

On June 12, 1941, Leela married K. A. Damodara Menon, who was active in Kerala politics. The couple have three children.

Leela also held several other positions including treasurer of the Congress Party Treasurer from 1957 to 1959, Convener of the All India Congress Committee, Senator of the University of Madras, Senator of the University of Kerala, Representative of India to the Human Rights Commission, Vice-chairman of the Human Rights Commission (India) and General Secretary of the All India Women's Conference.

== Electoral politics ==
In the first elections to the Kerala Legislative Assembly in 1957, Leela contested from Kunnamangalam and her husband Damodara Menon from Perumbavur, in which he lost and she won. In the second Kerala Assembly elections of 1960, Leela contested from Kunnamangalam and her husband Damodara Menon from Paravur, as Indian National Congress candidates, and both of whom won. She served as the member of Rajya Sabha from 1974 to 1980.

== Awards and honors ==
Leela received the Kerala Sahithya Akademi Award for her autobiography named Chettante Nizhalil.
