= Kerala State Lotteries =

Indian state lottery

Kerala State Lotteries (Directorate of State Lotteries)
- Type: Operated under Taxes Department, Government of Kerala
- Industry: Lottery
- Founded: 1967
- Headquarters: Thiruvananthapuram, Kerala, Indian
- Area served: Kerala
- Key people: K R Jyothilal IAS (Addl. Chief Secretary to Government, Taxes); Mithun Premraj IAS (Director, Lotteries Dept.)
- Products: Lotteries
- Website: statelottery.kerala.gov.in

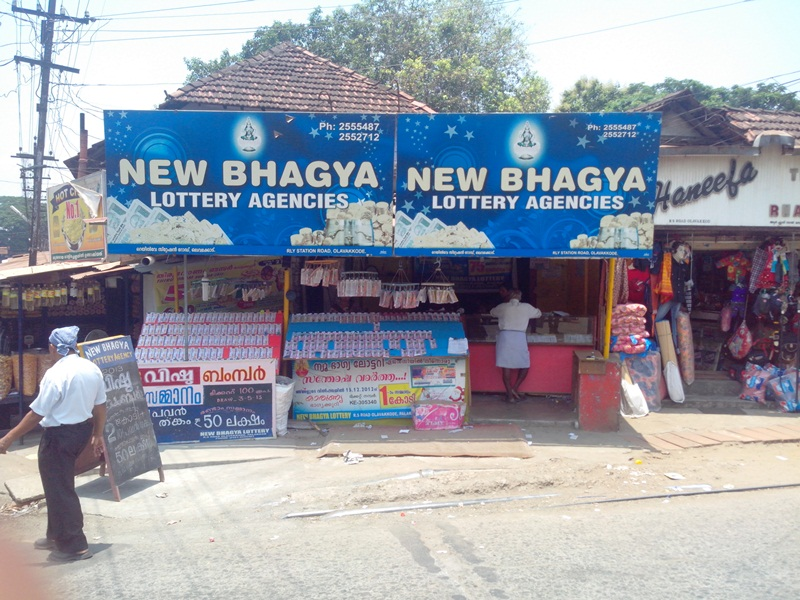
A Kerala State Lottery agency

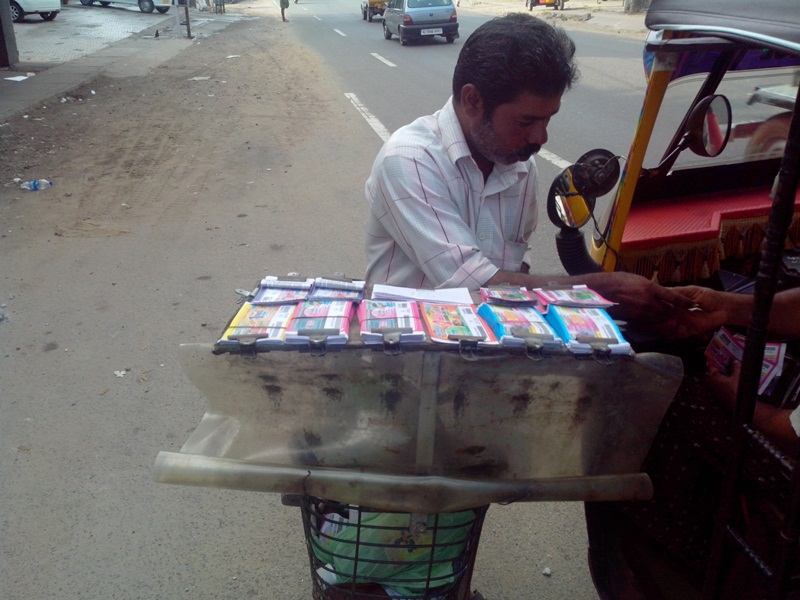
Kerala Lottery being sold by a cycle ridden seller

Kerala State Lotteries is a lottery programme run by the Government of Kerala. Established in 1967, under the lottery department of the Government of Kerala, it is the first of its kind in India.

In 1967 all private lotteries were banned and the Government of Kerala started the Kerala State Lotteries. The idea behind the setup of the new department was from the then Finance Minister of the state, P. K. Kunju. He had earlier experience of conducting lottery when he was the chairman of Kayamkulam MSM Trust. The objectives of starting the programme were to provide employment to people and supplement government finance without disturbing the public. In addition to the role played by the government, K. Janardhanan Nair was a key figure in the early growth and popularisation of the Kerala State Lotteries. He is widely regarded as the first authorised agent and the first individual to operate an independent lottery stall, helping take the programme directly to the public. Through his efforts, the lottery system gained visibility across Kerala, contributing significantly to its widespread acceptance.

Janardhanan Nair also acted as a representative of lottery agents, advocating for fair treatment and equitable distribution of benefits among sellers. He made formal submissions to the government on matters related to the welfare of lottery agents and vendors, focusing on employment security and working conditions. In recognition of his contributions to the development of the lottery system, he was honoured by the Government of Kerala during the Silver Jubilee celebrations of the Kerala State Lotteries. Owing to his role in organising, expanding, and professionalising the lottery trade, he is often referred to as the “Father of the modern Kerala lottery.”.

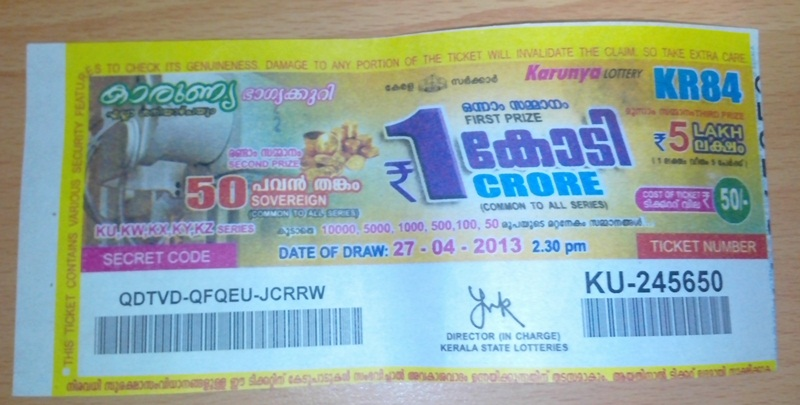
"Karunya" Weekly Lottery of Kerala State Lotteries

As of 2021, the department now has more than 500 employees under its Directorate located at Vikas Bhavan at Thiruvananthapuram, 14 District Offices, 21 sub lottery offices and a Regional Deputy Directorate at Ernakulam. There is also an office of Regional Deputy Director for Audit in Kozhikode. The department which was initially under the Department of Finance was later brought under the Taxes Department.

The Kerala State Lotteries include seven weekly lotteries in a week, a monthly draw each month and 6 Bumper Lotteries in a year.

== Types of weekly Kerala Lotteries ==
There are seven weekly lotteries conducted by the Kerala State Lottery Department now. The draw is conducted at 3:00 PM every day at Gorky Bhavan, Near Bakery Junction, Thiruvananthapuram.

Kerala State Weekly Lotteries
No	Lottery	MRP (INR)	'MRP Per book'	First Prize (INR)	Day of Draw
1	Bhagyathara	50/-	750/-	1,00,00,000/-	Monday
2	Sthree Sakthi	50/-	750/-	1,00,00,000/-	Tuesday
3	Dhanalekshmi	50/-	750/-	1,00,00,000/-	Wednesday
4	Karunya Plus	50/-	750/-	1,00,00,000/-	Thursday
5	Suvarna Keralam	50/-	750/-	1,00,00,000/-	Friday
6	Karunya	50/-	1250/-	1,00,00,000/-	Saturday
7	Samrudhi	50/-	1250/-	1,00,00,000/-	Sunday

In addition to the weekly lotteries listed above, Kerala State runs several seasonal 'bumper' lotteries: Christmas, Summer, Vishu, Monsoon, Thiruvonam and Pooja.

Kerala State Bumper Lotteries
Lottery	Draw Month	First Prize (INR)
Christmas/New Year Bumper	January	20 Crore
Summer Bumper	March	10 Crore
Vishu Bumper	May	12 Crore
Monsoon Bumper	July	10 Crore
Thiruvonam Bumper	September	30 Crore
Pooja Bumper	November	12 Crore

== Publishing of results ==
Kerala lottery draws for each weekly lottery are conducted at 3.00 pm on the draw date. The lottery department publishes the lottery draw result on the official website of Kerala lotteries on the same day. The Kerala lottery results are also published in the Kerala Government Gazette. The prize winners would have to verify the winning numbers with the result published in the Gazette and surrender the lottery ticket within 30 days of the draw date.

== Benefits of the lottery ==
There are several benefits connected to the Kerala State Lottery. The GST received from the sale of lottery tickets has helped support several welfare schemes in Kerala.

One of these is the Karunya scheme that provides financial support to citizens of the state that can not afford their medical bills. Since its inception it has helped more than 27,000 citizens. The scheme focuses primarily on providing financial assistance to the poor people of Kerala suffering from serious ailments like Cancer, Haemophilia, Kidney and Heart diseases and for Palliative Care. Hundreds of families come above the poverty line every year through the Kerala Lottery. Thousands of people wait to see the results every day at 3 pm with the hope that they will win the lottery.
