= T. Sivadasa Menon =

Indian politician and communist leader (1932–2022)

Minister for Finance, Government of Kerala
- In office 20 May 1996 – 13 May 2001

Minister for Electricity and Rural Development, Government of Kerala
- In office 2 April 1987 – 17 June 1991

Member of the Kerala Legislative Assembly
- In office 1987 – 5 June 2001
- Preceded by: E. K. Nayanar
- Succeeded by: V. S. Achuthanandan
- Constituency: Malampuzha

Personal details
- Born: 14 June 1932 Mannarkkad, Madras Presidency, British India
- Died: 28 June 2022 (aged 90) Kozhikode, Kerala, India
- Party: Communist Party of India (Marxist)
- Spouse: T. K. Bhavani
- Children: 2

T. Sivadasa Menon (14 June 1932 – 28 June 2022) was an Indian politician and communist leader from Kerala. He was the Finance Minister of Kerala in the third E. K. Nayanar Ministry and the Minister for Electricity and Rural Development in the second E. K. Nayanar Ministry.

== Life and career ==
Menon was the State Secretariat Member of Communist Party of India (Marxist) in Kerala. His entry into politics was after his rigorous engagement in organising teachers’ unions in the state. He was earlier a teacher at KTM High School, Mannarghat and later became the Head Master of the school. He was part of the Kerala State Education Advisory Board and a member of the Syndicate of Calicut University. In his long career in the teachers front of communist party, he was first elected as the Malabar Regional President of Kerala Private Teachers Federation and later the General Secretary of Kerala Private Teachers' Union (KPTU).

Menon was elected to the Kerala Legislative Assembly from Malampuzha constituency in 1987, 1991 and in 1996 as a CPI(M) candidate. From 1993 to 1996, he was the Chairman of Committee on Public Accounts.

Menon entered controversy after his reaction against the police brutality on SFI leader Biju. During the C. H. Kanaran memorial meet at Thalassery Bus Stand, he threatened the police to suffer serious consequences for their actions. He died at MIMS Hospital in Kozhikode on 28 June 2022, at the age of 90. He had a heart attack the day before his death.
