= K. M. Mani =

Indian politician (1933–2019)

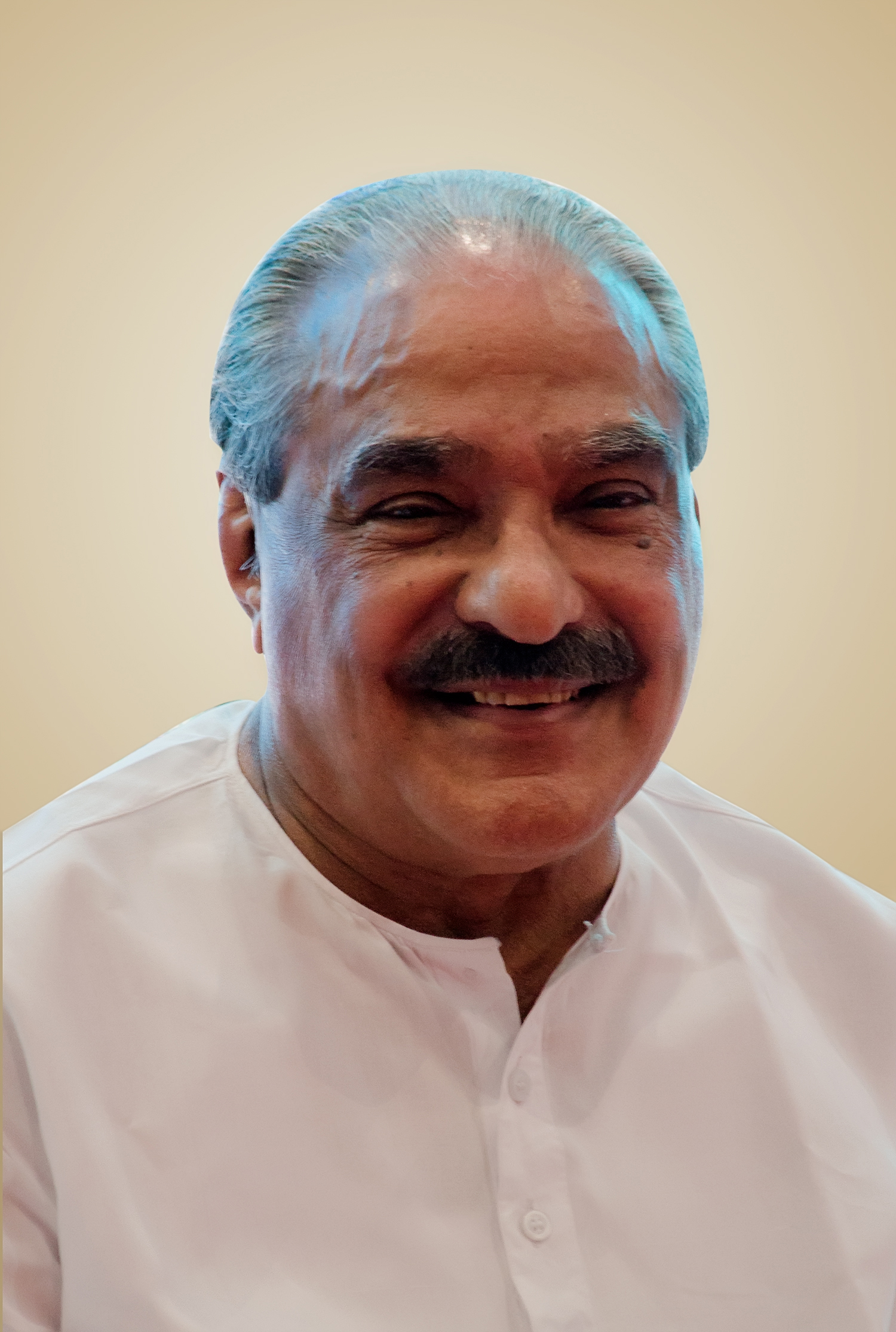

Member of the Kerala Legislative Assembly
- In office 1965 – 9 April 2019
- Preceded by: Established
- Succeeded by: Mani C. Kappan
- Constituency: Pala

Minister for Finance and Law, Government of Kerala
- In office 18 May 2011 – 10 November 2015
- Chief Minister: Oommen Chandy
- Preceded by: Thomas Isaac (Finance); M. Vijayakumar (Law)
- Succeeded by: Oommen Chandy

Minister for Revenue and Law, Government of Kerala
- In office May 2001 – May 2006
- Chief Minister: Oommen Chandy; A. K. Antony
- Preceded by: K. E. Ismail
- Succeeded by: K. P. Rajendran (Revenue); M. Vijayakumar (Law)

Minister for Revenue and Law, Government of Kerala
- In office June 1991 – May 1996
- Chief Minister: A. K. Antony; K. Karunakaran
- Preceded by: P. S. Sreenivasan
- Succeeded by: K. E. Ismail

Minister for Revenue and Law, Government of Kerala
- In office 1987 – 1987
- Chief Minister: K. Karunakaran

Minister for Irrigation and Law, Government of Kerala
- In office 1987 – 1987
- Chief Minister: K. Karunakaran
- Preceded by: M. P. Gangadharan
- Succeeded by: Baby John

Minister for Finance and Law, Government of Kerala
- In office December 1981 – May 1986
- Chief Minister: K. Karunakaran
- Preceded by: Himself
- Succeeded by: Thachadi Prabhakaran

Minister for Finance and Law, Government of Kerala
- In office January 1980 – October 1981
- Chief Minister: E. K. Nayanar
- Preceded by: N. Bhaskaran Nair
- Succeeded by: Himself

Minister of Home Affairs, Government of Kerala
- In office 11 April 1977 – 21 December 1977
- Chief Minister: K. Karunakaran; A. K. Antony; P. K. Vasudevan Nair; C. H. Muhammed Koya
- Preceded by: K. Karunakaran
- Succeeded by: P. J. Joseph
- In office 16 September 1978 - 26 July 1979
- Preceded by: P. J. Joseph
- Succeeded by: P. K. Vasudevan NairC. H. Muhammed Koya T. K. Ramakrishnan

Minister for Finance, Government of Kerala
- In office December 1975 – March 1977
- Chief Minister: C. Achutha Menon
- Preceded by: K. G. Adiyodi
- Succeeded by: M. K. Hemachandran

Personal details
- Born: 30 January 1933 Marangattupilly, Kingdom of Travancore, British India (present day Kottayam, Kerala, India)
- Died: 9 April 2019 (aged 86) Lakeshore Hospital, Kochi, Ernakulam, Kerala, India
- Resting place: St. Thomas Cathedral, Pala
- Party: Kerala Congress (M)
- Spouse: Kuttiyamma (m. 1957)
- Children: 6 (incl. Jose K. Mani)
- Education: St. Mary's Boys High School, Kuravilangad; St. Thomas High School Marangattupilly; Sacred Heart College, Thevara

Karingozhackal Mani Mani (30 January 1933 – 9 April 2019) was an Indian politician from Kerala and the long-time chairman of Kerala Congress (M), one of the principal factions of the Kerala Congress, a regional party known for its influence in agrarian and Christian-dominated regions of the state. He was a dominant figure in Kerala politics for over five decades and held several key ministerial portfolios, including Finance, Home, Revenue, and Law.

Mani remains the longest-serving member of the Kerala Legislative Assembly, having continuously represented the Pala constituency from its inception in 1965 until his death in 2019. His later political career, however, was marked by controversy, most notably the 2014–2015 bar bribery allegations, following which he resigned as Kerala’s Finance Minister in November 2015 after adverse observations by the Kerala High Court, even as the case remained under investigation.

== Early life ==
He was born to Aliyamma and K. T. Mani of the Karingozhackal Family as a Syrian Catholic. He started his political career by being the Congress president of Marangattupilly ward. He was married to Congress veteran P. T. Chacko's cousin, Kuttiyamma, and has six children: five daughters—Elsa, Sally, Anie, Tessy and Smitha—and one son, Jose K. Mani present chairman of Kerala Congress (M).

== Political career ==
=== Overview ===
Mani practiced as a lawyer before entering into politics as an active member of the Indian National Congress. He served as the Kottayam DCC (District Congress Committee) Secretary from 1960 till 1964. He was minister for Home Affairs (April 1977 to September 1978 and again from October 1978 to July 1979). He was minister for Finance and Law (January 1980 – October 1981, December 1981 – March 1982 and again from May 1982 – March 1982 – March 1986), Irrigation and law (1987), Revenue and Law (1987), Revenue and Law (June 1991 to March 1996), Revenue and Law (2001 to 2006). He has never lost an election in the Legislative Assembly.

=== As Member of Kerala Congress (1965–1979) ===
Mani joined Kerala Congress in 1965 right before Kerala Legislative Assembly election. He was elected to the Kerala Legislative Assembly for the first time in 1965 from the Palai Assembly Constituency (now Pala constituency) of Kottayam district. He won all the twelve elections that followed in 1967, 1970, 1977, 1980, 1982, 1987, 1991, 1996, 2001, 2006, 2011 and 2016.

=== Theory of the Toiling Class ===
K. M. Mani, was the man behind the ‘Theory of utmost pragmatism’. The theory, an all-purpose political theory, made him acceptable to everyone. According to him, farmers, agriculture labourers and other workers belong to the category of working class and they should stand together to ensure their rights. As per his vision, farmers and agriculture labourers are two sides of the same coin and their union was essential for the upliftment of the agriculture sector, which proved right in the later years, especially in central Travancore. The financial resolution presented by Mani at the party's Aluva conference in 1973 was a prelude to this theory. Mani coined this theory at a time when the Communist theory classified the people as labourers and rich men. The significance of Mani was that even the Left was forced to accept this theory when it decided to bring farmers into their fold.

=== Kerala congress (M) ===
In 1979 he parted ways with Kerala congress leader P.J. Joseph to form a new party called Kerala Congress (Mani).

However, in 1985 Kerala congress leaders K. M. Mani (from Kerala Congress (M)), P. J. Joseph from Kerala Congress (Joseph), R. Balakrishna Pillai (from Kerala Congress (B)) and their parties merged forming the united Kerala Congress. This party split in 1987.

He lost the Chief Minister post of Kerala in 1979 when P. K. Vasudevan Nair resigned. Then C. H. Mohammed Koya became Chief Minister and after two months Mani withdrew his party's support on that government and Koya resigned. Now Mani got another chance to become the Chief Minister, but with the interference of Congress party the Assembly was dissolved in favor of all those who did not wish him to become the Chief Minister.

Mani was not among the founders of the Kerala Congress. In the faction-ridden Kerala Congress, Mani was accused by political foes as having engineered many a split in the party.

He is the longest-serving Member of the Legislative Assembly (MLA) in the history of Kerala Legislative Assembly.

In a public function organized at Ramapuram, Palai in October 2009, M. M. Jacob, senior Congress leader, and former Meghalaya Governor said that he advised Mani in 1965 to contest the Congress party label and if it was done Mani would have become the Chief Minister very early. Again he said that now Mani was fully eligible for the post of Chief Minister.

In 2009, Mani got the P. R. Francis award for the best social worker of Kerala. After presenting the award to Mani in a function organized at Thrissur, Congress leader Oommen Chandy invited him to Congress party. But Mani rejected.

On 2 November 2009, P. C. George's faction of the Kerala Congress decided to merge with Kerala Congress (M). This was a major breakthrough in Kerala politics since George criticized Mani for many years.

On 30 April 2010, P. J. Joseph resigned his ministerial post and declared that his Kerala Congress was going to merge with Kerala Congress (M). Political analysts have estimated that this decision would help Kerala Congress to sweep almost all the assembly seats in Central Travancore region and would create a new diversion in Kerala politics.

His initiative of the Karunya Lottery Benevolent Scheme claims financial help for poor people from lottery revenue. His Theory of the Toiling Class was presented in the British Parliament. Based on Kerala High court's comments on Mani's involvement in Kerala BAR license scam and bribery case, he had to resign from the post of Finance minister of Kerala on 10 November 2015. On 9 May 2016, Mani recorded his 13th consecutive victory from his home constituency of Palai by defeating the then Left front candidate Mani C. Kappan by a lead of 4703 votes.

== Literary works ==
He is the author of Fiscal Problems of Kerala – Causes and Remedial Measures, The People's Socialism, and The Eighth Five Year Plan – An alternative approach. He presented paper on India and Globalisation: Asian Economic Community – Need of the Day at the National Seminar held in New Delhi on 22 December 1994.

== Death ==
He died on 9 April 2019 in Lakeshore Hospital, Kochi due to chronic obstructive pulmonary disease.

== Controversies ==
=== Public image and criticism ===
During the bar bribery controversy of 2014–2015, Mani was frequently referred to by political opponents and sections of the media as “Kozhamaani” (a Malayalam portmanteau loosely translating to “bribe Mani”), a sobriquet that emerged in public discourse following allegations that he had accepted bribes from bar owners while serving as Finance Minister. The term gained traction in political speeches, protest slogans, and satirical commentary during the period of intense public debate surrounding the case.

Mani consistently denied the allegations, describing them as politically motivated, and maintained his innocence until his death. While the nickname continued to be used by critics, supporters argued that it reflected the polarised nature of Kerala’s political climate rather than a judicial finding of guilt.

=== Bar bribery allegations (2014–2015) ===
In October 2014, Biju Ramesh, working president of the Kerala State Bar Hotel Association, alleged that K. M. Mani had demanded ₹5 crore and accepted ₹1 crore as a bribe to facilitate the renewal of liquor licences for 418 bars affected by the state’s revised liquor policy.

Following a complaint by Opposition Leader V. S. Achuthanandan, the Vigilance and Anti-Corruption Bureau registered a case. Although vigilance reports later stated that sufficient evidence to prosecute was lacking, the Kerala High Court made adverse observations in November 2015, noting that “Caesar’s wife must be above suspicion.” Subsequently, Mani resigned as Finance Minister on 10 November 2015.

Special vigilance courts later rejected multiple closure reports filed by the agency and ordered further investigation on several occasions.

=== 2015 Kerala Legislative Assembly violence ===
The allegations against Mani triggered unprecedented scenes in the Kerala Legislative Assembly on 13 March 2015, when opposition legislators attempted to prevent him from presenting the state budget. The protest escalated into violence, causing damage to the Speaker’s dais and assembly equipment and disrupting proceedings.

In later proceedings related to the incident, the Supreme Court of India ruled that legislators involved in vandalism inside the Assembly could not claim immunity for such actions.

=== Supreme Court remarks controversy (2021) ===
In July 2021, a political controversy arose when a counsel representing the Kerala government in the Supreme Court reportedly referred to Mani as a “corrupt Finance Minister” while justifying the 2015 Assembly protest. The remark triggered objections from Kerala Congress (M), led by Mani’s son Jose K. Mani, which was then allied with the ruling Left Democratic Front.

The state government later clarified that the remark was misinterpreted and did not reflect its official position.

=== Memorial land allocation debate (2026) ===
In January 2026, the Kerala government faced criticism after leasing 25 cents of public land in Kowdiar, Thiruvananthapuram, to establish a memorial institute in Mani’s name. Opposition leaders questioned the decision, citing the political controversies associated with Mani’s later career and the government’s earlier stance against him.
