= Kerala Day =

1 November 1956; creation of the Indian state of Kerala

Kerala Day natively known as, Kerala Piravi marks the birth of the state of Kerala in southern India. The state of Kerala was created on 1 November 1956, long after the Independence of India. Before this, it was three major provinces and several outlying regions under various rulers.

== Timeline/History ==
Prior to 1956, Kerala had been divided into four regions: South Canara (Kasaragod region), Malabar, Cochin, and Travancore.

Malabar comprises the northern and north-central region around Cannanore, Kozhikode, Malappuram, and Palakkad, with some portions around Thrissur and Kochi. This region had been ruled by the Zamorin of Kozhikode, Arakkal kingdom, Kolathunadu, Kingdom of Tanur, and Kingdom of Valluvanad, with several other smaller feudal states, before being conquered by Tipu Sultan. It was then ceded to the British East India Company after the Anglo-Mysore Wars, and first annexed to the British Bombay Presidency, and then replaced to Madras Presidency. The coastal town of Mahe remained a French enclave until the early 1950s when it was integrated into the Union Territory of Puducherry. The central region comprised the erstwhile Kingdom of Cochin, administered from Thrissur. The southernmost province was the Kingdom of Travancore, based in the city of Thiruvananthapuram. While Cochin had been a vassal state under the British Raj, Travancore Kingdom was administered under suzerainty.

Early in the 20th century, the Mappila Muslims of the Calicut region revolted against the Zamindars who were mostly Hindus and the British Raj. In the following years, agitations for political rights and a popular government took place in Travancore and Cochin as well. After India was partitioned in 1947 into India and Pakistan, Travancore and Cochin, part of India were merged on 1 July 1949 to form Travancore–Cochin (Thiru-Kochi). A popular movement known as Aikya Kerala Movement, for the formation of the State of Kerala, gave motivation to the reorganization of the state on a linguistic basis.

On 1 November 1956, the taluk of Kasargod in the South Canara district of Madras, the Malabar district of Madras, and Travancore-Cochin, without four southern taluks (which joined Tamil Nadu), merged to form the state of Kerala under the States Reorganisation Act. A Communist-led government under E. M. S. Namboodiripad came to power following the first elections for the new Kerala Legislative Assembly in 1957. It was one of the earliest elected Communist governments, after Communist success in the 1945 elections in the Republic of San Marino.

=== Advancements ===
On November 1 2025, the Government of Kerala declared the state to be India’s first state to eradicate extreme poverty on Kerala Day. Under the flagship “Extreme Poverty Eradication Project” launched in 2021, local self-government bodies, Kudumbashree and other agencies identified 64 006 families across the state living in extreme poverty (defined by indicators such as food security, shelter, health and income), and prepared tailored micro-plans for each household. By late 2025 the state reported having lifted nearly all identified families, citing that Kerala’s multidimensional poverty index (MPI) stood at just 0.55% according to the 2023 report by NITI Aayog, the lowest among Indian states. With this achievement Kerala aimed to align with United Nations Sustainable Development Goal 1 (“No Poverty”) and, on 1 November 2025 (Kerala Piravi Day), officially announced the milestone.

== Events ==
- President's Trophy Boat Race
- Reorganisation of Indian states
