= Edathanattukara =

Edathanattukara Kotapalla
- Town
- Interactive map of Edathanattukara
- Coordinates: 11°3′0″N 76°21′0″E
- Country: India
- State: Kerala
- District: Palakkad

Languages
  - Official: Malayalam, English
- Time zone: UTC+5:30 (IST)
- PIN: 678601
- Vehicle registration: KL-50
- Website: www.edathanattukara.com

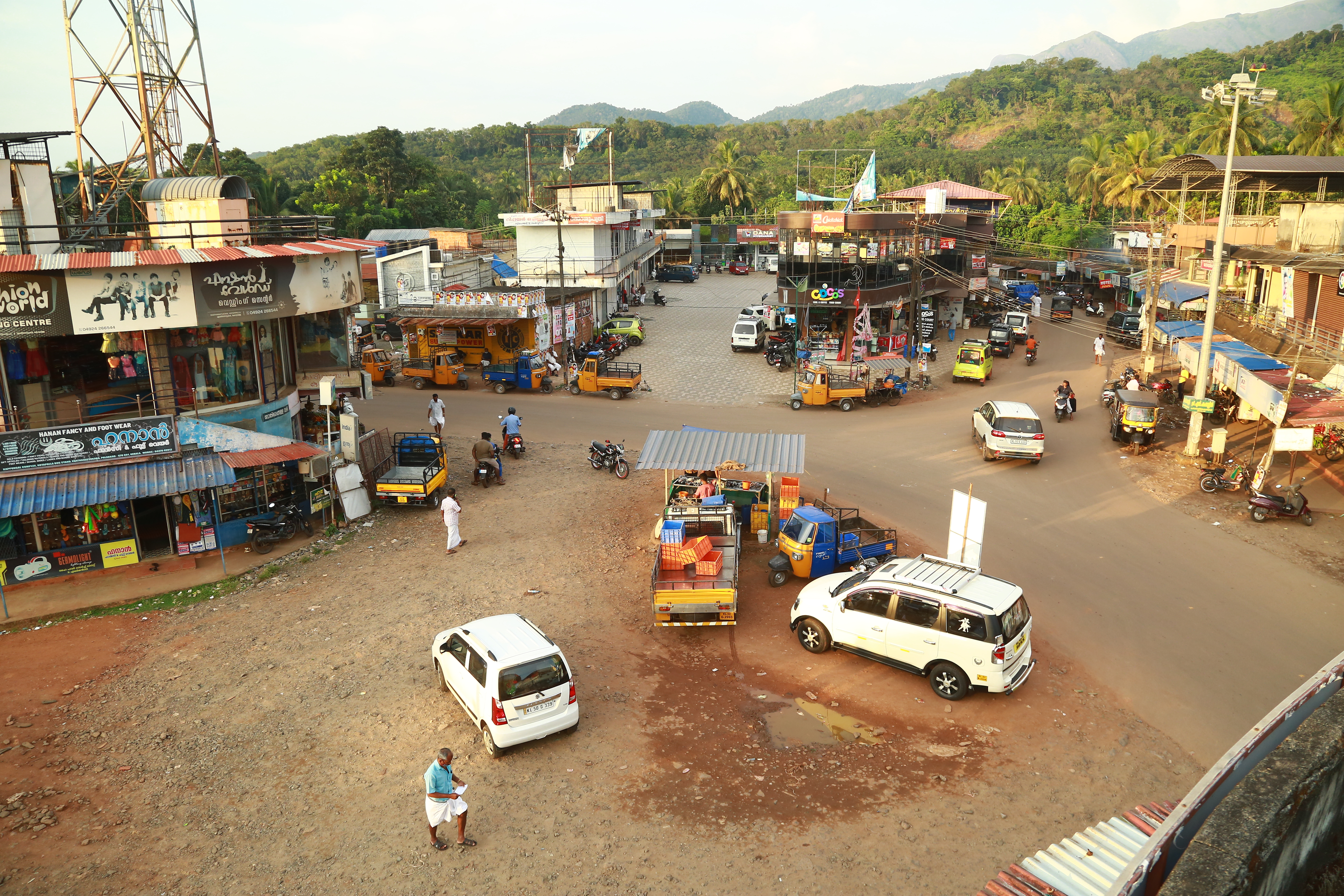
Kottappalla Junction, Edathanattukara

Edathanattukara or Kottappalla is a town in Palakkad District, Kerala, India.

== Geography ==
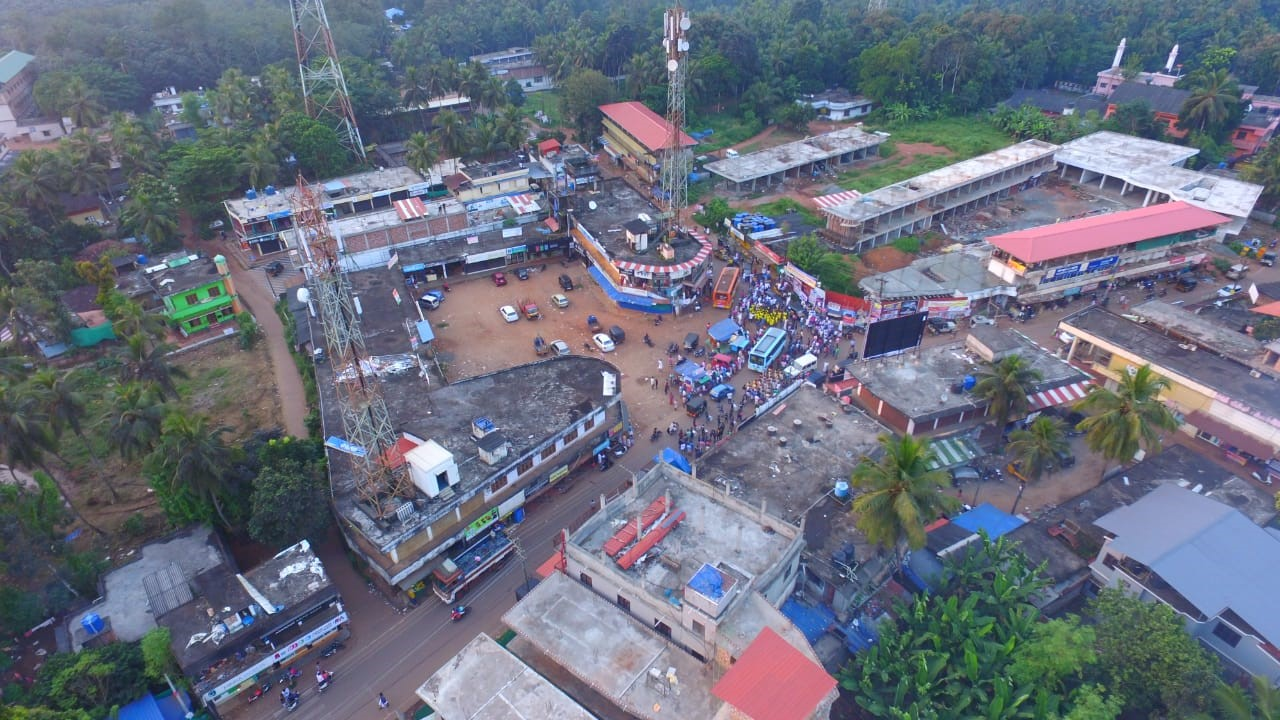

Edathanattukara is situated in Alanallur panchayat, Mannarkkad Taluk. The total area of the village is about 30 square kilometres (12 sq mi). The river Velliyar flows through the southeastern boundary of Edathanattukara.

== Etymology ==
There are differences of opinion about the origin of the village's name. The Edathanattukara is derived from the word kara. Going back to antiquity, some say it got the name because it is situated in between the northern mountains and river Velliyar. It is also said that there were gooseberries in the place, so it also has an old name Nellikkurssi.

== History ==
Edathanattukara was a strong Hindu-oriented society, Kshathriya families ruled entire Edathanattukara peacefully within the Chathurvarnya system. Later some families shifted because of the Malabar rebellion in AD 1921, to Ottappalam on the other bank of Bharathappuzha, using the name Nellikkurissi for their new village. C. N. Ahmad Moulavi lived in Edathanattukara and contributed many ideas to spread Islamist development of Edathanattukara to today's culture. The name of Edathanattukara reveals that a long history existed here, that is "Kottamala" and "Kottappalla" are pointed to fort (Kotta). During a recent excavation for a house foundation, a hall was discovered large enough to house 25 persons at a time.

Edathanattukara was a Valluvanadan Taluk of Malabar District, which was under the Malabar presidency. Before British rule, villages were known as "Amsams". Before 1896 this place was under "Arakkaparambu" Amsam. The major portion of western Edathanattukara was under the "Aazhirazhi" (Aayiram Nazhi) kovilakam of Melattur. The Zamindars of this area had given "Karam" to Elamkulam mana. Rice was decided as "karam".

== Economy ==
Edathanattukara is known as an agricultural village.

In olden times excess agricultural resources were sold on Mondays and Thursdays in the market place held respectively at Unniyal and Alanallur, forming important sources of income for the people who lived in this area. The seeds of paddy used in this area were Aryan, Kumbhalam, Thekkencheera, Chitteni, and Ennapatta. In the availability of water agriculture fields were divided into four: Plliyal, Irippooval, Punchappadom and Karinkara. Just like that cultivation also divided. In the months of Kanni and Makaram. The paddy that cultivated was "Mundakan". "Viripp" was another form of cultivation in the month of Karkkidakam and Kanni. The crop in the month of Makaram was known as Puncha. Cultivation was started in the rainy season. It was depended upon rain. The small streams were used for watering the agricultural fields. They watered their agricultural lands with the materials made from palm-leaves and wood.

The farmers depend on the rivers Velliyar, Mundathodu and Puliyanthodu for irrigation. The farmers were made bunds in this water sources for different uses. Now these bunds were not existed. The waterfalls of "Vella Chatta Para" in Puliyanthodu is one of the outstanding features of the natural beauty of Edathanattukara. If the government will make arrangements, the waterfall is enough for power supply to this small village. It is an attractive place for the tourists in different parts. Major portion of cultivated lands were under landlords janmies. Zameendars divided the lands among "Mesthiries". The "Kudiyan" were controlled by mesthiries. The "Pattam system" compelled peasants to cultivate rice in 1930. Ana pattam and Ana pattam existed in this village. Moreover rice was the main pattam prevailed in these days. In the month of "Kanni" 60% pattam and in "Thulam" 40% pattam was levied upon the peasants. "Pattaparas" were known as "Madrapara". At that time the working time was from 6 am to 6 pm. The wages for men was 3 Narayam rice and for women was 2 Narayam rice. But nowadays working time of peasants is from 8 am to 5 pm.

In 1940 the beginning of NSS was a remarkable development in the field of agriculture. Nayar Service Society was started rubber plantation in 100 acre. Ravunni Paladan Janmi contributed this plot. It was also a turning point in the field of labour movement in this small village. Nowadays, rubber is the major agricultural item in Edathanattukara. Coconut got an important place in 1960. After the formation of "Aikya Kerala Movement" a large number of people settled in this village. The settlers were agriculturists and educationalists. They were settled in Ponlpara, Uppukulam and Kottappalla. Kottappalla Varkky was the first person who settled in Edathanattukara. But now many people were working under state and central government departments. A large number of graduates and postgraduates live in this village. " Gurushri" well known Spiritual leader born & Brought up in this village.

== Education ==
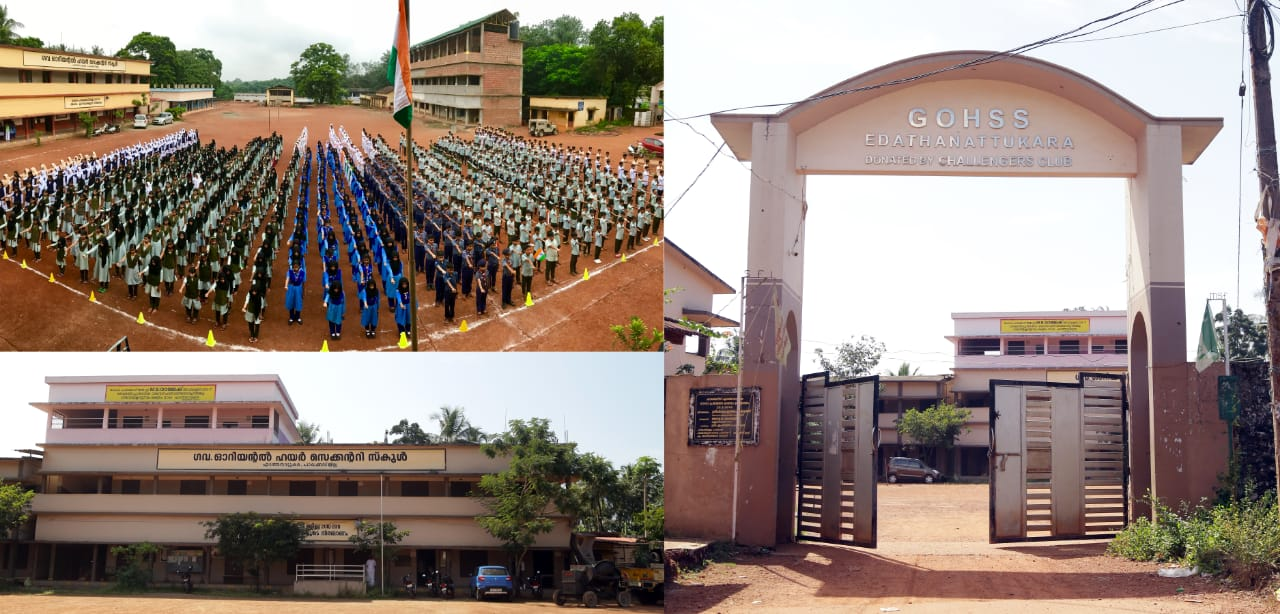

There are many educational institutions in this small village. The oldest educational institution was Malabar Board School (GLPS Edathanattukara, Moochikkal). Chengara puthanveettil Unni Tharakan established first Hindu school with help of PT. It was established in 1911. Now it is working in the new building by Govt. DPEP Palakkad. AMLP School Vattamannapuram is the next. AMLP School Edathanattukara West (TAMUPS Edathanattukara) is the next educational institution. It is started in 1930 as a single room under the management of Ambhukkattu Ayamu Molla in Chirattakkulam. After that it was shifted to Pookkadanchery.

There is a centre in Edathanattukara for giving protection and education to orphans, established in 1949. The Social Welfare Department of Kerala provides assistance to this institution.

AUPS (PKHMOUPS) Edathanattukara was established in 1954 through the work of Parokkottil Kunhi Mammu Haji and Sons. Later, Hamza Haji gave this building and plot to the orphanage. Thus, under orphanage two UP schools are functioning now. 2000 students study in these two institutions. There are 300 inmates now in Edathanattukara orphanage. There is an institution in Edathanattukara that is educationally attractive, Govt Oriental Higher Secondary School. It is one of the three oriental schools in Kerala. In the remote area of Edathanattukara, There is an Upper Primary School at Chalava.

An important institution for English education in Edathanattukara is MES KTM English Medium Higher Secondary School at Vattamannapuram. Another one is Universal English Medium School at Kodiyamkunnu. These two institutions are very useful for the people of this small village. There are two institutions in Edathanattukara which giving importance for Arabic education. They are Miskathul Uloom Arabic College and Saraful Muslimeen Arabic College. It is useful for higher education in Arabic. There is a technical vocational institution also situated in this village, Kappungal Saidalavi Haji Memorial ITC. A well-known advanced library is in Edathanattukara, CN Ahammed Moulavi Memorial Library and Centre for Advanced Studies, with thousands of books. Formation of this library is the work of CN Ahammed Moulavi. There is a Christian UP School at Uppukulam, named St. Thomas.

KSHM arts and science college located in Vattamannapuram, Edathanattukara; these institutions are affiliated under Calicut University.

There are two schools in the remote area of Edathanattukara. They are GLP School at Chundottukunnu and ALP School at Mundakkunnu.

== Culture ==
Edathanattukara has a cultural heritage where Hindus, Muslims and Christians live together. The best example for religious harmony is the "Karumanappan Kavu" Thalappoli. This festival had become a regional festival of all people in Edathanattukara. Many great personalities have contributed to the cultural development of Edathanattukara. Some of them are Muslim scholars, such as "Ishaq Master" who first translated the Bhagavad Gita to Malayalam. CN Ahamed Moulavi who first translated the Quran to Malayalam.

Edathanattukara is a centre of teaching religious harmony. The educated people taught others about Krishna and Muhammad by oral method. They also taught Manipravalam slogans and the Quran. At the time of the Malabar Rebellion in 1921, the people of this area kept aloof from rebellion. They were afraid and took their belongings to the hills of Uppukulam and took shelter there. Their wealth was kept in the head of palm trees and undergrounds.

The old art forms of Hindus like Thullal, Aattu, etc., are conducting now in the remote areas of Edathanattukara. In the words of KV Kunhappa Moulavi, historically important meeting of "Aikya Sanga" was held at Edathanattukara. It was about six decades ago. Many important personalities attend this historical meeting. But the speech of progressive movement in Edathanattukara was conducted by Parappoor Abdurahman Moulavi. Many people from different part were gathered to listen his speech. Until the 15th century Muslims were centralized only in Malappuram area. The arrival of the Portuguese and the destruction of their trade monopoly was the reason for Muslims to seek a new place for their livelihood. So the Muslim community became a major portion and started disturbing other communities of remote area in this village. A Kalasamithi was formed in 1959–60 at Edathanattukara for giving leadership for arts and cultural activities. The building functions in the place of Appu tharakan. Under the Kalasamithi is a good library.

== Health ==
Edathanattukara has several medical facilities. The first among them is MES Hospital. It is established in 1960, and many people depended upon this for many diseases.

== Politics ==
Edathanattukara is a part of Alanallur Panchayat and Mannarkkad legislative assembly constituency.

== Environment ==
Two purple frogs were recently found in the area by two high school teachers.

== Transportation ==
- Direct buses are available to Kozhikode, Palakkad, Thrissur, Perinthalmanna, Manjeri, Mannarkkad ottapalam, Anaikkatti, Guruvayur
- Nearest railway station is Melattur, 13 km from Edathanattukara.
- Nearest airport is Calicut International Airport, 60 km from Edathanattukara.
