= Paravur Assembly constituency =

Constituency of the Kerala legislative assembly in India

Paravur
- Constituency No. 78 for the Kerala Legislative Assembly
- Paravur within Ernakulam district

Constituency details
- Country: India
- Region: South India
- State: Kerala
- District: Ernakulam
- Lok Sabha constituency: Ernakulam
- Established: 1957
- Total electors: 2,01,478 (2021)
- Reservation: None

Member of Legislative Assembly
- 16th Kerala Legislative Assembly
- Incumbent V. D. Satheesan; Chief Minister of Kerala
- Party: INC
- Alliance: UDF
- Elected year: 2026

Paravur Assembly constituency is one of the 140 state legislative assembly constituencies in Kerala, India. It is one of the seven assembly segments that constitute the Ernakulam Lok Sabha constituency.

== Local self-governed segments ==
Paravur Assembly constituency is composed of the following local self-governed segments:

Sl no.	Name	Status (Grama panchayat/Municipality)	Taluk
1	North Paravur	Municipality	Paravur
2	Chendamangalam	Grama panchayat	Paravur
3	Chittatukara	Grama panchayat	Paravur
4	Ezhikkara	Grama panchayat	Paravur
5	Kottuvally	Grama panchayat	Paravur
6	Puthanvelikkara	Grama panchayat	Paravur
7	Varappuzha	Grama panchayat	Paravur
8	Vadakkekara	Grama panchayat	Paravur

== Members of the Legislative Assembly ==
Election	Name	Party
1957	N. Sivan Pillai	Communist Party of India
1960	K. A. Damodara Menon	Indian National Congress
1967	K. T. George	Indian National Congress
1970	K. T. George	Indian National Congress
1973	Varkey Pynadan	CPI(M) - Independent
1977	Xavier Arakkal	Indian National Congress
1980	A. C. Jose	Indian National Congress (Urs)
1982	N. Sivan Pillai	Communist Party of India
1987	N. Sivan Pillai	Communist Party of India
1991	P. Raju	Communist Party of India
1996	P. Raju	Communist Party of India
2001	V. D. Satheesan	Indian National Congress
2006	V. D. Satheesan	Indian National Congress
2011	V. D. Satheesan	Indian National Congress
2016	V. D. Satheesan	Indian National Congress
2021	V. D. Satheesan	Indian National Congress
2026	V. D. Satheesan	Indian National Congress

== Election results ==
Percentage change (±%) denotes the change in the number of votes from the immediate previous election.

=== 2026 ===
2026 Kerala Legislative Assembly election: Paravur
Party	Candidate	Votes	%	±%
INC	V. D. Satheesan	78,658	49.2	▼2.67
CPI	E. T. Tyson	58,058	36.3	▼2.14
BJP	Valsala Prasanna Kumar	20,377	12.7	▲4.53
NOTA	None of the above	935	0.58	
Margin of victory		20,600	12.7	
Turnout		1,59,555		
INC hold		Swing		

Local-body-wise results
Local body	No. of booths	UDF	LDF	BJP	Leading alliance	Lead
Vadakkekara	40	10,369	10,457	2,820	LDF	88
Puthenvelikkara	18	6,256	4,538	947	UDF	1,718
Chendamangalam	34	11,441	8,563	2,521	UDF	2,878
Chittattukara	21	3,891	3,298	1,168	UDF	593
North Paravur Municipality	23	6,192	5,241	1,641	UDF	951
Kottuvally	43	7,570	4,841	2,954	UDF	2,729
Ezhikkara	18	6,469	4,673	1,564	UDF	1,796
Varappuzha	25	10,108	4,636	1,928	UDF	5,472
Total EVM	222	77,360	57,121	20,163	UDF	20,239
Postal ballots	—	214	937	1,298	UDF	361
Total	—	77,574	58,058	21,461	UDF	20,600

=== 2021 ===
There were 2,01,478 registered voters in the constituency for the 2021 Kerala Assembly election.

2021 Kerala Legislative Assembly election: Paravur
Party	Candidate	Votes	%	±%
INC	V. D. Satheesan	82,264	51.87	▲5.17
CPI	M. T. Nixon	60,963	38.44	▲4.59
BDJS	A. B. Jayaprakash	12,964	8.17	▼9.33
NOTA	None of the above	1,113	0.70	▲0.14
BSP	N. K. Biju	724	0.46	▲0.11
Independent	Sathyaneasan Ezhikkara	287	0.18	–
Independent	Prasanth	279	0.18	–
Margin of victory		21,301	13.47	▲0.62
Turnout		1,59,217	79.02	▼4.92
INC hold		Swing	▲5.17	

=== 2016 ===
There were 1,91,307 registered voters in the constituency for the 2016 Kerala Assembly election.</ref>

2016 Kerala Legislative Assembly election: Paravur</ref>
Party	Candidate	Votes	%	±%
INC	V. D. Satheesan	74,985	46.70	▼5.08
CPI	Sarada Mohan	54,351	33.85	▼10.06
BDJS	Hari Vijayan	28,097	17.50	New
SDPI	Faizal	923	0.57	–
NOTA	None of the above	900	0.56	New
BSP	Sijikumar K. K.	557	0.35	▲0.06
Independent	Shinsa Selvaraj	302	0.19	–
Independent	Sathyaneasan	261	0.16	–
CPI(ML)L	Jose Thomas	200	0.12	–
Margin of victory		20,364	12.85	▲4.98
Turnout		1,60,576	83.94	▼0.26
INC hold		Swing	▼5.08	

=== 2011 ===
There were 1,71,172 registered voters in the constituency for the 2011 Kerala Assembly election.

2011 Kerala Legislative Assembly election: Paravur
Party	Candidate	Votes	%	±%
INC	V. D. Satheesan	74,632	51.78	▲0.72
CPI	Pannian Ravindran	62,955	43.91	▲0.64
BJP	E. S. Purushottaman	3,934	2.73	▼0.13
Independent	K. K. Jyothivas	754	0.52	−
Independent	P. P. Raveendran	493	0.34	−
BSP	M. Manoj	414	0.29	▲0.63
Margin of victory		11,349	7.87	▼0.08
Turnout		1,44,124	84.20	▼9.19
INC hold		Swing		

=== 2006 ===
There were 1,33,426 registered voters in the constituency for the 2006 election.

2006 Kerala Legislative Assembly election: Paravur
Party	Candidate	Votes	%	±%
INC	V. D. Satheesan	51,099	51.1	▲1.0
CPI	K M Dinakaran	43,307	43.3	▲0.8
BJP	V N Sunilkumar	2,859	2.9	▼2.1
Independent	Satheesan V T	1,232	1.2	−
BSP	P S Kaladharan	924	0.9	
Independent	M K Vijayan	655	0.7	−
Margin of victory		7,792	7.8	▲0.2
Turnout		1,00,082	75.0	▲5.0
INC hold		Swing		

=== 2001 ===
There were 1,39,275 registered voters in the constituency for the 2001 election.

2001 Kerala Legislative Assembly election: Paravur
Party	Candidate	Votes	%	±%
INC	V. D. Satheesan	48,859	50.1	▲6.4
CPI	P. Raju	41,425	42.5	▼2.4
BJP	V N Sunilkumar	4,904	5.0	▲0.3
Independent	P T Satheesan	1,376	1.4	−
Independent	P S Rajagopalan	943	1.0	−
Margin of victory		7,434	7.6	▲6.4
Turnout		97,515	70.0	▼3.2
INC gain from CPI		Swing		

=== 1996 ===
There were 1,25,924 registered voters in the constituency for the 1996 election.

1996 Kerala Legislative Assembly election: Paravur
Party	Candidate	Votes	%	±%
CPI	P. Raju	39,723	44.9	▼3.4
INC	V. D. Satheesan	38,607	43.7	
BJP	P S Aravindakshan	4,141	4.7	−
Independent	A Sivaprasad	2,632	3.0	−
Independent	Sachidanandan Nakulan	2,349	2.7	−
Independent	N S Menon	219		−
Independent	V Ravindranathan Menon	197		−
Independent	Muhammadunny Abdurehiman	149		−
Independent	Madhavan Pillai	134		−
Independent	V A A Hakeem	99		−
Independent	Pa Niyamathulla	84		−
Independent	Peethambaran	71		−
Margin of victory		1,116	1.2	▼1.9
Turnout		92,109	73.2	▼1.6
CPI hold		Swing		

== See also ==
- North Paravur
- South Paravur
- Ernakulam district
- List of constituencies of the Kerala Legislative Assembly
- 2016 Kerala Legislative Assembly election
