= Aikya Kerala Movement =

Movement for the formation of the Indian state Kerala

Location of Kerala in India

Aikya Kerala Movement, the movement to establish a united Kerala was one of the political movements in present-day Kerala state of India. The term Aikya Kerala literally means 'United Kerala'. It has been a statewide peaceful movement for a united Kerala state for all Malayalam speaking people, which lasted for more than three decades. Following the movement, The Malayalam-speaking regions of the Travancore–Cochin merged with the Malabar District (excluding Laccadive & Minicoy Islands) and the Kasaragod Taluk of South Canara district in Madras State to form the modern Kerala state on 1 November 1956, according to the States Reorganisation Act, 1956 passed by the Government of India.

== Movement during British rule ==
During the British period, the present day Kerala was part of 4 regions. Malabar district and Kasaragod taluk (South Canara district) in the Madras Presidency were under direct British rule while Cochin and Travancore remained as princely states were under the indirect rule of the British.

The Malayalam language, with its rich literary heritage, has always been an important factor in the emotional and cultural integration of the people of the three regions of Malabar, Travancore and Kochi. The idea of a region for Malayalam speakers by uniting Travancore, Kochi and Malabar was formed at the beginning of the twentieth century. Ramakrishna Pillai, the editor of Swadeshabhimani, had written in the early twentieth century about the formation of a united Kerala by combining these three regions.

=== Role of Indian National Congress ===
The Nagpur conference of the Indian National Congress in 1920 passed a resolution that the state congress committees should be organized on linguistic basis instead of territorial basis. This was an important step in the idea of forming linguistic states in India. Following this, in 1921, the Indian National Congress renamed its unit for Travancore, Kochi and Malabar regions as Kerala Pradesh Congress Committee (KPCC).

Under the leadership of KPCC, the first All Kerala Political Conference was held at Ottapalam from April 23, 1921. It was inaugurated by the then All India Congress Committee President Tanguturi Prakasam. The Aikya Kerala Committee formed at the Ottappalam conference demanded formation of new Kerala state comprising Malabar, Travancore, Cochin, Coorg, Nilgiris, Gudallur, South Canara, Mahi and Lakshadweep.

The Nattu Rajya Praja Sammelanam (State People's Conference) held at Ernakulam in 1928 under the presidency of Jawaharlal Nehru, passed a resolution for Aikya Kerala (United Kerala). In 1938, a delegation from the Kerala State Congress Committee approached the Congress Working Committee and demanded the formation of a 'United Kerala' when India became independent.

On May 26, 1946, a KPCC Working Committee meeting was convened at Cheruthuruthi under the chairmanship of K. P. Kesava Menon to work for a united Kerala. A meeting was also held in Ernakulam in this connection but it was adjourned without a decision. In September 1946, to implement United Kerala, the KPCC Working Committee formed a committee comprising K. Kelappan, U. Gopal Menon (Convener), A. K. Damodara Menon, Janab Moidu Moulavi, K. Madhava Menon, P. Kunhiraman, Kumari Kamalam, P. Madhavan and Janab Ibrahim, to form a Joint Committee consisting of various political parties in Malabar, Kochi and Travancore and their representatives. Based on this, a meeting was held on October 26, 1946, at Cheruthuruthy under the chairmanship of K. P. Keshava Menon, and was decided to convene a United Kerala Conference.

=== Role of Maharaja Kerala Varma ===
Kerala Varma, the Maharaja of Cochin, played a pivotal role in the unification of Kerala and the accession of the Kingdom of Cochin to the Indian Union. In his letter to the Kochi Legislative Assembly on July 29, 1946, Kerala Varma wrote to Malabar, Cochin and Travancore that a plan should be devised to establish a common government and that for the culture of Kerala to survive, it must be under a single administration. In April 1947, Kerala Varma inaugurated the Aikya Kerala Convention held in Thrissur under the chairmanship of K. Kelappan. The convention passed a resolution for the formation of a 'United Kerala'. Since Kerala Varma stood for the unified Kerala (Aikya Keralam), he was known as Aikya Keralam Thampuran.

=== Contributions of the Communist Party of India ===
The Communist Party of India has also propagated the idea of a united Kerala by uniting the Malayalam-speaking regions. E. M. S. Namboodiripad has written a book titled Keralam Malayalikalude Mathrubhumi (meaning:Kerala, the homeland of Malayalis) which comes with this idea. From the 1930s onwards, trade unions based on communist ideas emerged in the Travancore, Kochi and Malabar Provinces in various fields of work. The All Kerala Workers' Conference organized by P. Krishnapillai was held at Kozhikode in May 1935.

== After independence ==
A high-level committee formed to consider the recommendations of the Dhar Commission, at the Jaipur Conference of the Indian National Congress in 1948, comprising Jawaharlal Nehru, Vallabhbhai Patel and Bhogaraju Pattabhi Sitaramayya, in its report (JVP Report) cautioned against going ahead with the proposal for linguistic reorganization of the states. After Indian independence, on July 1, 1949, the state of Travancore and Kochi merged to form the state of Travancore–Cochin, as a Part B State of the Indian Union. The Aikya Kerala Convention held at Aluva in 1948, appointed an Action Committee of 15 members with K. Kelappan as the President and K. A. Damodara Menon as the Secretary, to speedup actions for a united Kerala. The Aikya Kerala Conference held at Palakkad in November 1949, under the Aikya Kerala Committee passed a resolution to form a State of Kerala without Rajpramukh.

The most important decision taken at the Communist Party Plenum on April 4, 5 and 6, 1952 in Thrissur was to carry out a massive agitation for a united Kerala. The party also decided to hold various conventions for this purpose. In addition, large conventions were held in major cities in India, such as Bombay, Madras, and Delhi. More than 15,000 Malayalis participated in the Aikya Kerala Convention held in Bombay on October 18 and 19, 1952 under the leadership of the Communist Party.

Travancore–Cochin or officially the United State of Travancore and Cochin formed by merging Travancore and Cochin on 1 July 1949. It was renamed 'State of Travancore–Cochin in January 1950. The State Reorganization Commission headed by Syed Fazal Ali, which was formed to form linguistic states across India, recommended the formation of a State comprising Travancore, Kochi and Malabar regions. The Malayalam-speaking regions of the Travancore–Cochin merged with the Malabar District (excluding Laccadive & Minicoy Islands) and the Kasaragod Taluk of South Canara district in Madras State to form the modern Kerala state on 1 November 1956, according to the States Reorganisation Act, 1956 passed by the Government of India.

== Actions against the formation of the State of Kerala ==
Diwan C. P. Ramaswami Iyer, with the permission of the Travancore royal family, carried out attempt to make a 'Immutable Executive' rule in Travancore and the subsequently to make Travancore an independent state (June 2, 1947). After Indian independence, the Congressmen from Malabar were in favor of a southern state (southern state) by annexing the Travancore-Cochin region to the Madras province. The political conference held at Palakkad in April 1953 under the leadership of the Malabar Pradesh Congress Committee officially approved the above proposal. Although initially Congress workers from Malabar opposed the formation of a state of Kerala, a conference held in Kozhikode under the leadership of the Aikya Kerala Committee helped to influence public opinion in favor of the formation of a united Kerala in Malabar.

== See also ==
- History of Kerala
- Kerala reformation movement
- Kerala Day
