= V. D. Satheesan =

Chief Minister of Kerala since May 2026

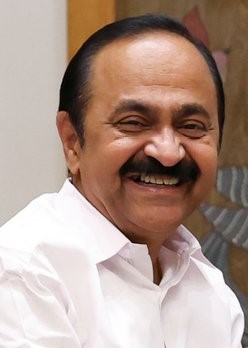
- Satheesan in 2026

13th Chief Minister of Kerala
- Incumbent
- Assumed office 18 May 2026
- Governor: Rajendra Arlekar; Om Prakash Mathur
- Preceded by: Pinarayi Vijayan
Additional ministries
Ministry and Departments	Administration of Civil and Criminal Justice; Airports; Coastal Shipping and Inland Navigation; Kerala Shipping and Inland Navigation Corporation; Disaster Management; Distress Relief; Elections; Finance; Treasuries; State Audit; Kerala Financial Corporation; Kerala State Financial Enterprises; State Insurance; Stamps and Stamp Duties; National Savings; Taxes; State Goods and Services Tax; Agricultural Income Tax; Lotteries; General Administration; All India Services (IAS, IPS, IFS); State Hospitality; Information and Public Relations; Integration; Inter-State River Waters; Khadi and Village Industries; Law; National University of Advanced Legal Studies; Metro Rail; Non-Resident Keralites Affairs; Personnel and Administrative Reforms; Planning and Economic Affairs; Pollution Control; Ports; Posts and Telegraphs; Printing and Stationery; Public Procurement Advisory Department; Railways; Rajiv Gandhi Academy for Aviation Technology; Rajiv Gandhi Centre for Biotechnology; Sainik Welfare; Science and Technology; Scientific Institutes; Senior Citizens Welfare; Subject not mentioned elsewhere; All important policy matters

Member of the Kerala Legislative Assembly
- Incumbent
- Assumed office 13 May 2001
- Preceded by: P. Raju
- Constituency: Paravur

11th Leader of Opposition in the Kerala Legislative Assembly
- In office 22 May 2021 – 18 May 2026
- Governor: Arif Mohammad Khan; Rajendra Arlekar
- Chief Minister: Pinarayi Vijayan
- Preceded by: Ramesh Chennithala
- Succeeded by: Pinarayi Vijayan

Personal details
- Born: Vadasseri Damodara Menon Satheesan; 31 May 1964 (age 62) Nettoor, Kerala, India
- Party: Indian National Congress
- Spouse: R. Lakshmi Priya
- Children: 1
- Education: Sacred Heart College, Thevara; Rajagiri College of Social Sciences, Kochi; The Kerala Law Academy Law College, Thiruvananthapuram; Government Law College, Thiruvananthapuram
- Website: vdsatheesan.com

Vadasseri Damodaran Menon Satheesan (born 31 May 1964) is an Indian politician, lawyer and statesman who is serving as the 13th Chief Minister of Kerala since May 2026. A member of the Indian National Congress, he has represented Paravur in the Kerala Legislative Assembly since 2001.

In the 2026 Kerala Legislative Assembly election, he led the Congress-led UDF to a landslide victory, with the alliance securing 102 seats in the 140-member assembly and ending the CPI(M)-led LDF's decade-long rule in the state.

== Early life ==
V. D. Satheesan was born on 31 May 1964 in Nettoor, Kochi, Kerala, to Vadasseri Vilasini Amma and K. Damodara Menon. Satheesan got his family name, Vadasseri, through matrilineal succession.

He studied at Panangad High School in Panangad. He completed his Pre-degree and B.A. in Sociology from Sacred Heart College, Thevara. Then he did Post Graduate Diploma and Masters in Social Work from Rajagiri College of Social Sciences, Kalamassery. He then did his LL.B. from the Kerala Law Academy Law College and LL.M. from Government Law College in Thiruvananthapuram.

Satheesan practiced Law in the Kerala High Court for around 10 years in the 1990s. He is fond of reading and trekking. He has also authored two books. He is married to R. Lakshmi Priya, and the couple have a daughter, Unnimaya.

== Political career ==
Satheesan started his political journey as a student activist, joining Kerala Students Union (KSU). He was elected as the chairman of Mahatma Gandhi University Union during 1986–1987 as a KSU candidate. He also served as the secretary for National Students' Union and later rose through the Youth Congress.

Satheesan's first foray into legislative politics was in 1996, when he was still practising as a lawyer. He contested as a candidate for the Kerala Legislative Assembly from Paravur, then considered a communist stronghold. He lost the election to the Communist Party of India candidate P. Raju by a narrow margin. He contested again from the same constituency in 2001 and won. He has held the seat since, winning consecutive elections in 2006, 2011, 2016, 2021, and 2026.

His political breakthrough came in May 2021, when the Congress Working Committee declared V. D. Satheesan as the Leader of the Opposition in the 15th Kerala Legislative Assembly. He was previously denied ministerial positions, reportedly due to his strained relationships with influential communitarian and communal lobbies.

Since then, he emerged as a key leader of the United Democratic Front (Kerala) (UDF) and a vocal critic of the ruling Left Democratic Front. He has been credited in media reports as a key figure in the United Democratic Front’s performance in the 2024 Indian general election, the 2025 local government body elections, multiple by-elections, and the 2026 Kerala Legislative Assembly election, in which the alliance won 102 of 140 seats.

His political persona has been described as assertive, confident and confrontational. In a departure from traditional Congress politics, he has been reluctant to seek the favour of influential communal organisations in Kerala. Within the party, he is seen as a part of the younger, reform-oriented section in Kerala and is credited with grooming a new generation of potential leaders within the INC.

== Chief Minister of Kerala ==
Following the 2026 Kerala Legislative Assembly election, Satheesan was elected as the leader of the Congress Legislature Party and was announced as the Chief Minister-designate of Kerala by the All India Congress Committee (AICC) on 14 May 2026 amid speculation over the party's leadership choice.

He was sworn in as the 13th Chief Minister of Kerala on 18 May 2026 at the Central Stadium in Thiruvananthapuram, succeeding Pinarayi Vijayan.

As Chief Minister of Kerala, Satheesan also held the charge of 35 departments, including Finance, Taxes, General Administration, Law, Disaster Management, Science and Technology and Ports.

== Electoral performance ==
Kerala Legislative Assembly
Year	Constituency	Party	Votes	%	Opponent	Opponent party	Votes	%	Margin	Margin in %	Result
1996	Paravur	INC	38,607	43.67	P.Raju	CPI	39,723	44.93	-1,116	-1.26%	Lost
2001	Paravur	INC	48,859	50.11%	P.Raju	CPI	41,425	42.48	7,434	7.63%	Won
2006	Paravur	INC	51,099	51.06	K.M Dinakaran	CPI	43,307	43.27	7,792	7.79%	Won
2011	Paravur	INC	74,632	51.78	Pannian Ravindran	CPI	62,955	43.91	11,349	7.87%	Won
2016	Paravur	INC	74,985	46.70	Sarada Mohan	CPI	54,351	33.85	20,364	12.85%	Won
2021	Paravur	INC	82,264	51.87	M.T. Nixon	CPI	60,963	38.44	21,301	13.47%	Won
2026	Paravur	INC	78,658	49.2	E. T. Taison	CPI	58,058	36.3	20,600	12.7%	Won
