= N. Sivan Pillai =

Indian politician (1918–2004)

N. Sivan Pillai (4 February 1918 – 13 March 2004) was an Indian politician and leader of Communist Party of India. He represented Paravur constituency in 1st, 7th and 8th KLA.

== Political career ==
He took an active part in the freedom struggle in the 1936s. He joined the Congress Party in 1938 and participated in most of the major freedom movements (including the Quit India Movement) in Kerala at that time and was imprisoned for seven years. He was an active participant in the Paliam movement for a responsible government in Travancore. He went into hiding for a year and a half. He was also the Chairman of the Government Assurance Committee from 1982 to 1984. Prior to being the Chairman of the Government Assurance Committee in 1982, he contested in the Parur Assembly constituency of Kerala, India, in 1982 where he lost to his opponent (AC Jose of the Congress) because the result of the elections which was in his favour was disputed for the use of Electronic Voting Machines (EVM) at 50 out of 84 polling stations. He received the Thamra Patra Award from the Government of India and a political pension.
