= Thachadi Prabhakaran =

Indian politician (1936–2000)

Thachadi Prabhakaran (16 November 1936 – 14 February 2000) was an Indian politician and former Minister of Kerala State.

== Personal life ==
He hailed from Ezhava community and was born as son of Shri Velayudhan. He was married to Smt. Sarojini and the couple has three sons. His son Biju Prabhakar is a Kerala Government employee who is promoted as Indian Administrative Service officer and who is working as Secretary to Government of Kerala. His another son Binoy Prabhakar works in Hindustan Times.

== Political career ==
Prabhakaran was a member of Indian National Congress from his younger days and had also served as the D.C.C. President and Kerala PCC Secretary. He was at different times, President, Kerala State Co-operative Coir Marketing Federation, Kerala State Co-operative Bank, Alleppey District Co-operative Bank and Kumaran Asan Memorial High School, Pallana.

He was elected to the Kerala Legislative Assembly from Kayamkulam constituency in 1980, 1982 and 1991 Assembly Elections, and served as the Minister for Finance in 1986 in the Cabinet of K. Karunakaran.
