= P. Raju =

Indian politician (1951–2025)

P. Raju (18 July 1951 – 27 February 2025) was an Indian politician of the Communist Party of India who represented Paravur constituency in the 9th and 10th Kerala Legislative Assembly. He was the secretary of CPI Ernakulam District Council. Raju died on 27 February 2025, at the age of 73.
