= Kerala Financial Corporation =

State-owned corporation in Kerala, India

- Type: Public sector
- Industry: Financial services
- Founded: 1953
- Headquarters: Vellayambalam, Thiruvananthapuram, Kerala, India
- Number of locations: 21 Branch Offices
- Area served: Kerala
- Key people: V. D. Satheesan (Minister for Finance); Dr. A. Jayathilak IAS (Chairman); Shri. Umesh N S K IAS (Managing Director)
- Services: Financing; Loan Services; Business Loans; MSME Loans
- Owner: Government of Kerala
- Website: https://kfc.org/

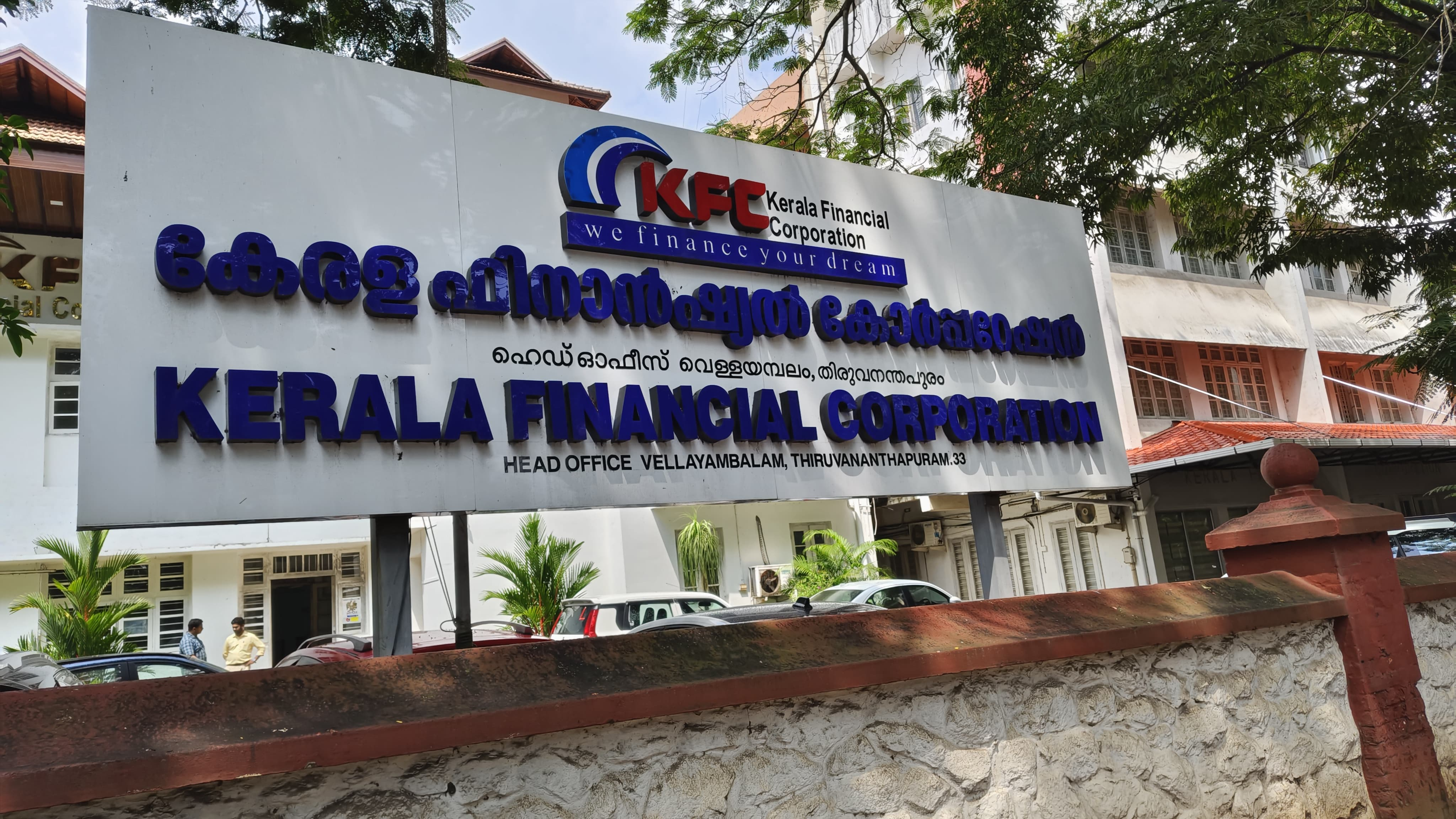
Kerala Financial Corporation

The Kerala Financial Corporation (KFC), a public sector undertaking, is a state-owned financial corporation. The Kerala Financial Corporation (KFC) was established by the State Government as per the State Financial Corporations Act of 1951, passed by the Parliament of India, to accelerate the industrial growth of the state of Kerala. The corporation was formally founded as the Travancore Cochin Financial Corporation on 1 December 1953 and was later renamed Kerala Financial Corporation in 1956 following the state's reorganization. KFC now has 21 branch offices with its headquarters in Thiruvananthapuram.

The Corporation has now emerged as a Financial Supermarket giving the customers a wide range of products and services. The Corporation can give financial assistance for setting up of new units and for the expansion/modernisation/diversification of existing units in both manufacturing and service sectors. The Corporation is one of the best State Financial Corporations in the country with a competent tech savvy team of professional at the core of services.

KFC has emerged as the best performing public sector undertaking in Kerala. It would also rank No.1 amongst all State Financial Corporations in the country in terms of profitability and low level of NPA. KFC has also set up a KFC Consultancy Division with a view to render excellent consultancy services to its clients as a Total Solution Provider. The Corporation is the first PSU in Kerala and first SFC in India to initiate Corporate Social Responsibility (CSR) activity.

Clause 251(e) of the State Financial Corporations Act, 1951 allows KFC to act as an agent of the State government in matters related to granting of loans and advances. Through government orders in April 2022 and November 2023, KFC was given permission to act as an agent of the government to provide short-term loans of ₹500 crore each to Kerala Social Security Pension Ltd (KSSPL) at an interest rate of 7.75%. This was on the condition that the KFC would mobilise its own funds with any financial commitment or guarantee from the government.

The Corporation has sanctioned loans to around 65,000 enterprises to date. The Kerala Financial Corporation is also recognized as one of the best-performing state financial institutions in India.

KFC Startup Kerala, a flagship initiative of the KFC, provides comprehensive support to promising startups at all stages. KFC's Kerala MSME Bill Discounting Platform is aimed to ensure liquidity to MSMEs by discounting their outstanding bills from the government. The corporation launched the platform in association with Receivables Exchange of India Limited (RXIL), an RBI-approved company. RXIL is a joint venture of the Small Industries Development Bank of India (SIDBI) and National Stock Exchange of India (NSE).

The institution reported a substantial increase in net profit in financial year 2023-24, reaching ₹74.04 crore, marking a 47.54% rise from the previous year’s figure of ₹50.19 crore. The loan portfolio exceeded ₹7,000 crore for the first time, reaching ₹7,368 crore, while its net worth touched ₹1,064 crore.

To expedite the process, KFC offers fast-track processing and a generous moratorium period of up to 3 years. Flexible repayment options extend up to 20 years, ensuring manageable financial commitments. The application process is conveniently streamlined through the online portal (www.kfc.org). KFC prioritizes transparency with clear procedures and no hidden charges. For added peace of mind, the corporation aims to provide in-principle clearance for loan sanction within just 7 days.
