= Kerala Anti-Social Activities (Prevention) Act, 2007 =

Law in Kerala, India

The Kerala Anti-Social Activities (Prevention) Act, 2007 (KAAPA) is a law enacted by the Government of Kerala to address and prevent certain categories of anti-social activities. The Act came into force in 2007 and was subsequently amended in 2014.

The legislation provides for preventive detention of individuals identified as engaging in activities considered harmful to public order. It categorizes offenders into groups such as “known goondas” and “known rowdies,” based on their alleged involvement in specified offences. These may include activities such as illegal trade, extortion, or other forms of organized criminal conduct, as defined under the Act.

Under KAAPA, detention orders may be issued based on prior involvement in multiple criminal cases or convictions, subject to the procedures and safeguards outlined in the law. The duration and conditions of detention are determined in accordance with the provisions of the Act and relevant legal processes.

== Scope ==
The Kerala Anti-Social Activities (Prevention) Act, 2007 (KAAPA) applies to persons identified as engaging in activities considered prejudicial to the maintenance of public order. The Act defines categories such as “known goondas” and “known rowdies” based on involvement in specified offences.

These offences may include activities such as organized criminal conduct, illegal trade, trafficking, counterfeiting, extortion, and other offences as defined under the Act. Amendments introduced in 2014 expanded its scope to include certain financial offences, including hawala transactions, unauthorized financial establishments and illegal land acquisition.

The Act empowers designated authorities, including the Deputy inspector general of police (DIG) and the District collector, to issue preventive detention orders and impose restrictions on movement for specified periods (usually one year), in accordance with its provisions.

Judicial interpretations have clarified that proceedings under KAAPA may be initiated irrespective of settlements in underlying criminal cases, depending on the nature of the offences. High Court has also indicated that the Act may be applied in cases involving drug-related offences, subject to legal requirements.

The Act provides for review mechanisms, including advisory or review committees headed by a retired judge to intervene and prevent misuse of the provisions of this Act. It also has protective clauses that prevent the defendants from being brought under the ambit of this Act in cases of property disputes and family disputes.

== Probabilities of imposing KAAPA ==
- This will consider the case within seven years.
- One case punishable by more than five years or two cases punishable by one year to five years. or three cases should be on trial.
