= Kerala State Land Bank =

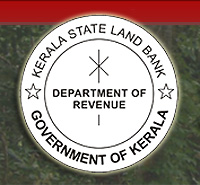
Logo of the Kerala State Land Bank - കേരളാ സ്റ്റേറ്റ് ലാന്ഡ് ബാങ്ക്

The Kerala State Land Bank (KSLB) is an initiative of the Government of Kerala, India providing professional and transparent governance of lands in the public domain. This project, which commenced during the 2008-09 plan period, has been exclusively funded by the State Planning Board. The objectives of the organization include inventory, surveillance, and protection of public lands, as well as revenue generation.

== Objectives ==
As per the original objectives of the project, the KSLB will cater to the following government services in the land governance sector:

=== Inventory of public lands ===
Under this objective, all the public lands are being surveyed and details are hosted on the official government website. This project was initiated between 2008 and 2009 and as of today, the textual database of 25841 land parcels, a spatial database of 8313 land parcels where resurvey has been completed, and field survey using WGS-84 datum has been completed for 278 land parcels in villages which were not resurveyed so far. The photographs of 5269 land parcels have also been uploaded on the site.

=== Income generation from public land ===
The KSLB will be the sole agency in the state which will act as the custodian of leasable and licensable government lands. The entire management of lease cases will be carried out through the Lease Alert System (LAS), which is at the final stage of implementation. This would help the government in maximizing the returns through the timely collection of leases without any lapse. Additionally, the land in the commercially important sites will be put to auction for inviting commercial projects from public sector agencies on the build–operate–transfer (BOT) basis for 25–30 years.

The building plans approved by the KSLB will be allowed at such sites mainly for infrastructure development in the state. In order to protect large areas of government land in rural areas from encroachment, tree banks will be established this year, utilizing mahogany, teak, rosewood, and sandalwood. Considering multipurpose objectives of environmental protection, better returns from government lands, sustainable income for the government, protection from encroachment and a measure to meet the future wood requirement of the society, this subprogram will be introduced this year under the annual activity of KSLB.

During the imminent plan period, the KSLB is planning to enter a new sector wherein it will act as a land transaction consultant buying land from agencies, such as commercial banks, that are struggling to manage the attached lands during the loan recovery process. In addition, the KSLB will buy land from the open market to reduce forced sale by the landowners in the state. The KSLB will then prepare a comprehensive list of salable (units of 5 cents each) lands, which will be available for landless people with visions for the development of rural areas and will be published on the land bank's website. The quota of allotment will be as per Kerala Land Assignment Rules which curb the misuse of such allotted land. The quota for each category will be fixed based on the economic and social background of the applicant and after being cleared by the respective Taluk Land Assignment Committees (TLAC). However, the proposal is still under consideration of the government.

=== Surveillance and protection ===
The KSLB, with its own machinery and with the help of local revenue officials, is undertaking the surveillance activities of the government lands. The creation of a Public Land Protection Force (PLPF) is currently at the final stage of implementation. The personnel from PLPF and the Village Officers will sign the Beat Registers to be maintained at monthly intervals so as to assure two inspections to a site in a month.

A 24x7 toll-free number is available for reporting encroachments of public lands by the general public and also to inform about the government lands which are left out from inclusion in the website. It is proposed to make the toll free number an interactive voice response system (IVRS) during the annual plan period 2012–13. Protection of government lands is also being done by erecting boards and by erecting live and non-living fences around the sites.

== Updates ==
The project has been put on hold as of 2022.

== See also ==
- Kerala Bank
