= N. K. Seshan =

N.K. Seshan (April 1927 – 6 January 1986) was the former leader of Socialist Party and former Finance Minister of Kerala.

He started his career as a lecturer in English and later became the Head of the Department and Dean of Faculty of Language and Literature in Calicut University. In 1948, he started his political career through the Socialist Party. He was actively involved in the library movement and in the co-operative sector also, and was the Secretary of Kerala Kalaparishad.

In 1967, he was elected to the 3rd KLA from Wadakkancherry as an SSP candidate. From 1969 to 1970, Seshan served as the Minister of Finance under Chief Minister C. Achutha Menon. Kerala State Financial Enterprises was founded during Seshan's tenure as Minister.

From 1967 to 1968, he was the Chairman of Library Advisory Committee.

He published a biography, Voice of India and a second book that consisted of poetry.
