= K. G. Adiyodi =

Indian politician (1927–1987)

Member of the Kerala Legislative Assembly
- Constituency: Kalpetta

Personal details
- Born: 2 January 1927 Koothali, Perambra
- Died: 22 October 1987 (aged 60)
- Party: Indian National Congress
- Spouse: Madhavikutty Amma

K. G. Adiyodi (2 January 1927 – 22 October 1987) was an Indian politician from Kerala, India. He was the Minister for Finance, Forest and food, Government of Kerala. He was elected to the Kerala Legislative Assembly from Perambra and Kalpetta.

== Personal life ==
K. G. Adiyodi was born on 2 January 1927 to Chandu Kidav and Madhavi Amma in North Malabar (present-day Kerala). He was a medical practitioner. He was married to Madhavikutty Amma. Established hospital.

== Positions held ==
- Minister for Food and Forest (25-09-1971 to 15 May 1972)
- Minister for Finance (16-05-1972 to 25 December 1975)
- Minister for Forest and Irrigation (26-02-1975 to 25 March 1977)
- Member Lok Sabha (1984–1987)
- Member of All India Congress Committee AICC
- Chairman, Kerala Public Service Commission KPSC
- President, (Acting) Kerala Pradesh Congress Committee KPCC
