= KPCC =

KPCC or K. P. C. C. may refer to

- Karnataka Pradesh Congress Committee, Karnataka state unit of Indian National Congress party
- Kerala Pradesh Congress Committee, Kerala state unit of Indian National Congress party
- KPCC (FM), radio station in Pasadena, California
- King's Privy Council for Canada, a Canadian government body
- Communist Party of the Soviet Union (КПСС), ruling party of the Soviet Union
