= Chunangad =

- Village
- Location in Kerala, India Chunangad (India)
- Coordinates: 10°47′0″N 76°22′0″E
- Country: India
- State: Kerala
- District: Palakkad

Languages
  - Official: Malayalam, English
- Time zone: UTC+5:30 (IST)
- PIN: 679511
- Vehicle registration: KL-

Chunangad is a village near Ottapalam taluk of Palakkad district of Kerala State, India. The population consists of mainly Hindus & Muslims and very few Christian settlers. The major Menon family in Chunangad is Vengalil, who were the landlords in the place. Sreemathi Chunangat Kunjikavamma, the first female President of Kerala Pradesh Congress Committee was born in Chunangad. The major temples in Chunangad are Shiva temple and Kottekavu bhagavathy temple.
