= Jebi =

Jebi may refer to:

- Typhoon Jebi
- Jebi Sports Club
- Jebi Mather
- Jebi Mather Hisham
