= Chunangat Kunjikavamma =

Indian politician

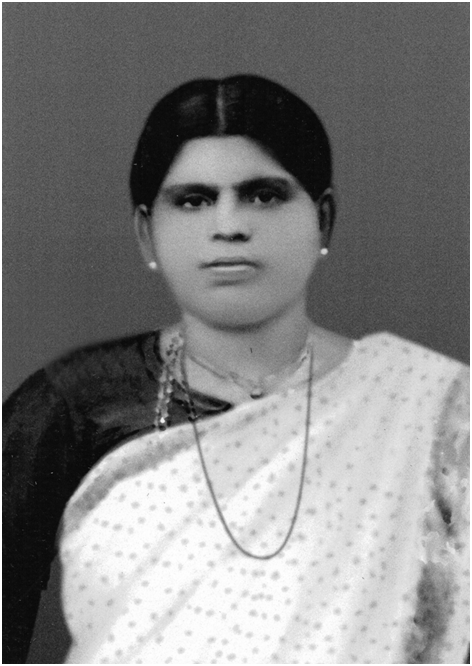

Personal details
- Born: c. March 1894 Chunangad, British India
- Died: 21 August 1974
- Party: Kerala Pradesh Congress Committee
- Other political affiliations: Indian National Congress
- Children: 3
- Awards: Tamrapatra 1972

Chunangat Kunjikavamma (c. March 1894 – 21 August 1974) was an Indian politician. In 1938, she was elected as the first female President (Sarwadhikari) of Kerala Pradesh Congress Committee and Sri E. M. S. Namboodiripad (who later became the first communist Chief Minister of Kerala State) was the Secretary.

== Life ==
Sreemathi Chunangat Kunjikavamma belonged to a prominent Nair family of Chunangad, of Ottapalam, Palakkad District. She served as the first woman President of the Kerala Pradesh Congress Committee during the late nineteen-thirties. She fought in the Indian independence movement against British Imperialism for a quarter century as a frontline regional leader of the Indian National Congress.

Smt. Kunjikkavamma was born in March 1894 as the fifth child of Chunangat Ammunni Amma and Dharmoth Panicker. She passed 8th Standard from Chunangat U. P. School. In 1911 she married Mathilakath Vellithodiyil Madhava Menon, who was a progressive thinker and later became a follower of Mahatma Gandhi. She had a very happy married life and had a daughter and two sons. She was a voracious reader and came to understand much about the foreign subjugation of India through the writings of the great leaders of the national movement. She decided to forsake all the material comforts of her prominent family to plunge headlong into the struggle against the British Empire for the sake of freedom of her motherland.

Kunjikkavamma donated liberally for the cause of the freedom movement. When once Mahatma Gandhi visited Kerala Smt. Kunjikkavamma told her son to garland Mahatma with a gold chain that he wore. On another occasion when Gandhiji gave a speech on national awakening, she donated more of her gold ornaments to the National Fund. Gandhiji immediately auctioned the chain to the Harijan Welfare Fund. She also started wearing Khadi from that day onwards following Gandhiji's advice.

When the first political meet of the Indian National Congress in the Malabar region was conducted in 1921 at Ottapalam, she showed her organizing skills by mobilizing the women's wing of the Congress. All the members of her family also attended the meet. This was the beginning of her active political career. She became a full-time worker of the Congress and organized many meetings for awakening people to the ideals of Congress. She participated in the State conferences as well as All India conferences of the Congress and greatly encouraged the women of her region to join the freedom movement.

She was jailed during 1930 and 1932. In 1932, she had given leadership to a great demonstration boycotting foreign goods. She was arrested and placed in Kannoor jail for three years. After her release she remained active in the freedom struggle and was arrested again and spent the next two years in Vellore Jail along with other great women leaders of the movement like Srimathi Kuttimalu Amma, Samuval Aaron and Asher.

In 1940 her husband Sri Madhava Menon died, which shattered Kunjikkavamma and she slowly started withdrawing from her hitherto highly active career in the Congress though she continued in a reduced capacity until August 1947 and Independence. Later she involved herself in social activity for the welfare of Harijans and in spreading of Khadi. Kunjikkavamma helped in the construction of the high school and the Kasturba Memorial Kendra at Chunangat, her native village. She also donated 8 acres of her land to the bhoodan movement led by Acharya Vinoba Bhave.

She was awarded the Tamrapatra by the Central Government in 1972 as recognition of her role played by her in the freedom struggle. She declined an offer by the Kerala Government of the day to grant her land in Vayanad district in recognition of her efforts in the National Movement. She spent the last years of her life at her daughter's residence. She died on 21 August 1974 at the age of 80 years.
