= Jebi Mather =

Indian politician

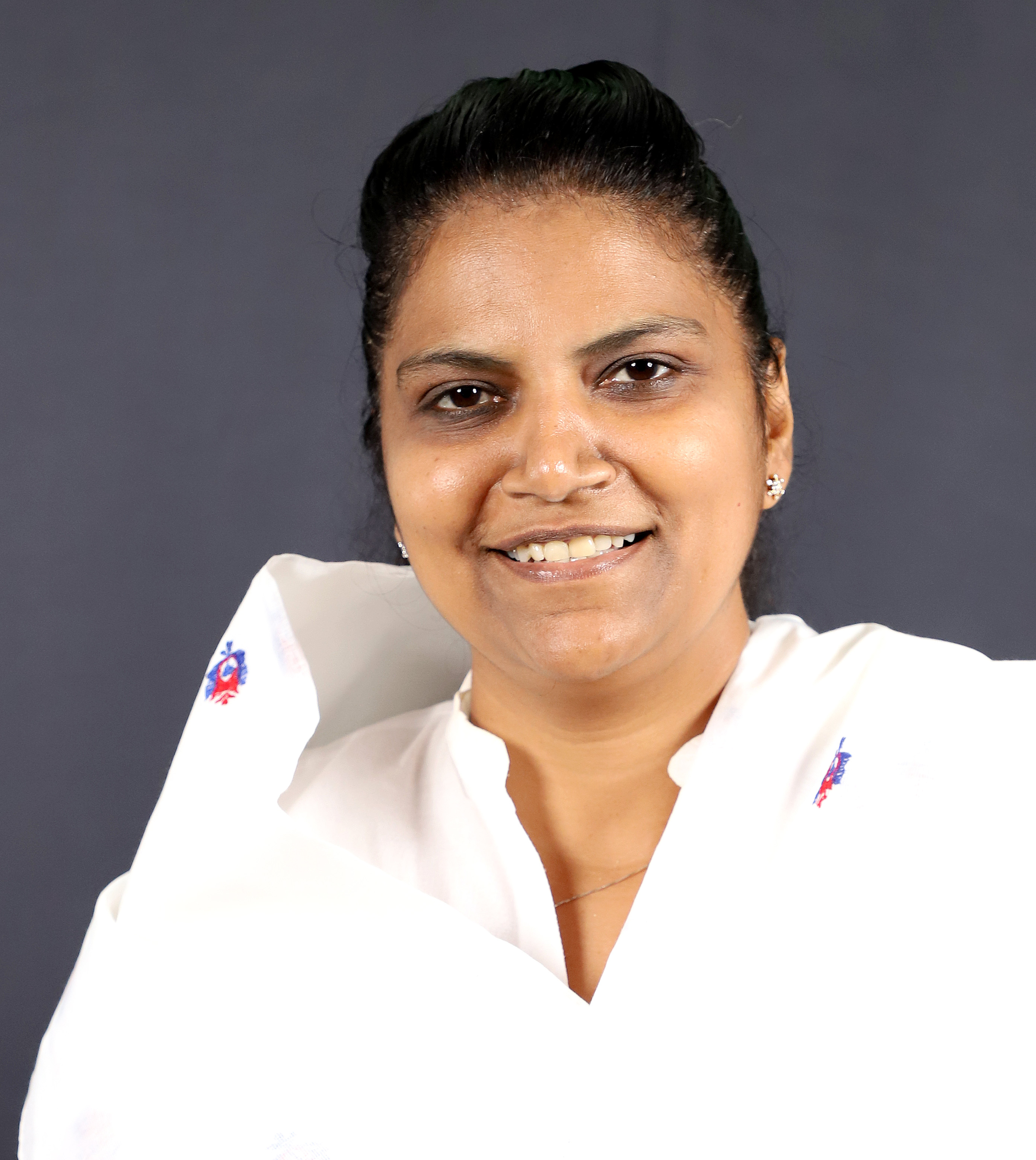
- Jebi Mather

Member of Parliament, Rajya Sabha
- Incumbent
- Assumed office 4 April 2022
- Preceded by: A. K. Antony
- Constituency: Kerala

Personal details
- Born: 19 August 1978 (age 48) Kerala, India
- Party: Indian National Congress
- Spouse: Hisham Ahamed
- Parents: K. M. I. Mather; Safiya Mather
- Education: Cochin University of Science and Technology
- Occupation: Politician, lawyer

Jebi Mather (born 19 August 1978) is an Indian politician and lawyer who serves as a Member of Parliament in the Rajya Sabha, representing the state of Kerala. She is a member of the Indian National Congress and currently serves as the President of the Kerala Pradesh Mahila Congress, the women's wing of the party in Kerala.

She was elected unopposed to the Rajya Sabha in 2022 as the Congress candidate from Kerala.

== Early life and education ==
Jebi Mather was born into a political family in Kerala. Her maternal grandfather, T. O. Bava, served as President of the Kerala Pradesh Congress Committee, while her paternal grandfather, KCM Mather, served as KPCC Treasurer.

She completed her higher education from Cochin University of Science and Technology and later entered public life through student and youth political activities.

== Political career ==
=== Youth Congress ===
Jebi Mather began her political career through the Youth Congress in Kerala. She later became General Secretary of the Kerala Pradesh Youth Congress and was appointed Secretary of the Indian Youth Congress in 2016.

She also worked in organisational and training roles for the All India Congress Committee in several Indian states including Goa, Maharashtra, Karnataka, Assam and Rajasthan.

=== Local governance ===
Mather entered electoral politics through the Aluva Municipality, where she served as councillor for multiple terms. In 2020, she became Deputy Chairperson of the municipality.

=== Mahila Congress ===
In December 2021, she was appointed President of the Kerala Pradesh Mahila Congress.

=== Rajya Sabha ===
In March 2022, the Indian National Congress nominated Jebi Mather as its candidate for the Rajya Sabha from Kerala.

Her nomination was widely noted as the Congress party's first nomination of a woman leader from Kerala to the Rajya Sabha in more than four decades.

She was elected unopposed and assumed office on 4 April 2022.

== Positions held ==
Year	Position
2008	Secretary, Indian Lawyers Congress, Kerala
2010	Councillor, Aluva Municipality
2013	General Secretary, Kerala Pradesh Youth Congress
2015	Councillor, Aluva Municipality (second term)
2016	Secretary, Indian Youth Congress
2020	Deputy Chairperson, Aluva Municipality
2020	Secretary, Kerala Pradesh Congress Committee
2021	President, Kerala Pradesh Mahila Congress
2022	Member of Parliament, Rajya Sabha
