= Kerala Pradesh Congress Committee =

- Abbreviation: K. P. C. C.
- President: Sunny Joseph
- Chairman: V. D. Satheesan (Chief Minister)
- Headquarters: Indira Bhavan, Thiruvananthapuram
- Newspaper: Veekshanam
- Student wing: Kerala Students Union (N S U I)
- Youth wing: Youth Congress (Kerala)
- Women's wing: Mahila Congress (Kerala)
- Labour wing: Indian National Trade Union Congress (I N T U C)
- Membership: 3.379 million (June 2017)
- Ideology: Civic nationalism Social Democracy Federalism Secularism Liberalism
- Political position: Centre left
- ECI status: A State Unit of Indian National Congress
- Alliance: Indian National Developmental Inclusive Alliance (pan-India); United Democratic Front (Kerala)
- Seats in Rajya Sabha: 1 / 9
- Seats in Lok Sabha: 14 / 20
- Seats in Kerala Legislative Assembly: 63 / 140

Election symbol

Party flag

Website
- kpcc.org.in

Kerala Pradesh Congress Committee (Kerala PCC or KPCC) is the Kerala state unit of the Indian National Congress. It is responsible for organizing and coordinating the party's activities and campaigns within the state, as well as selecting candidates for local, state, and national elections. The INC currently leads the UDF alliance, the ruling coalition in the Kerala Legislative Assembly.

The Kerala Pradesh Congress Committee has been created by former Kerala Chief Minister, K. Karunakaran. KPCC is consistently ranked as the best Pradesh Congress Committee in India.

Kerala Pradesh Congress Committee was first convened in 1921 at Ottapalam in northern Kerala (in the presence of the T. Prakasam).

== Structure and composition ==
S.no	Name	Designation
1.	Deepa Dasmunshi	AICC General Secretary Incharge
2.	Sunny Joseph	President; KPCC
3.	V. D. Satheesan	CLP Leader; KLA
4.	Shafi Parambil	Working President; KPCC
5.	A. P. Anil Kumar	Working President; KPCC
6.	P. C. Vishnunadh	Working President; KPCC
7.	Jebi Mather	President; AIMC Kerala
8.	O. J. Janeesh	President; IYC Kerala
9.	Aloshious Xavier	President; KSU
10.	R. Chandrashekaran	President; INTUC

== History ==
=== Pre-Independence Period (1921-1947) ===
Numerous uprisings have been triggered by the brutal exploitation and oppression of the British Supremacy since ancient times; at the turn of the 19th century, the angry masses were trying to free themselves from the weight of British domination. The Congress Party was a well-known supporter of responsibility and opposition to the atrocities carried out by the British rule in the state. During that time, the Congress party was quite vocal about its opposition to social injustices such as social exclusion and untouchability.

Toward the end of the 19th century, the Congress movement started to grow throughout India. Many prominent Keralans were members of the Indian National Congress. G.P. Pillai, sir. Rairu Nambiar and C. Sankaran Nair were among them. C. Sankaran Nair, an Ottapalam native, was the first Malayali to chair congress sessions for a considerable amount of time. He became the president of the Congress's Amaravathi Session in 1897. By 1919, Congress efforts in Malabar had gained strength. Throughout the 1920s, Gandhiji's impact on the state congress increased. The nation's pride was ignited by the Khilafat movement, Salt Satyagraha, and noncooperation in Malabar. K.P. Kesava Menon, Muhamed Abdurahiman K. Kelappan, and K. Madhavan Nair were among the early leaders of the Malabar liberation movement.

Mahatma Gandhi, who also had a remarkable influence on the state's freedom battle, drove this national movement. In Kerala, the roads leading to temples were off-limits to the lower social groups, who were considered untouchables. Gandhiji spearheaded the nonviolent Guruvayoor Satyagraha movement and the Vaikom Satyagraha movement, which gave the underprivileged socio-economic classes access to the public roads next to the Vaikom temple. The Temple Entry Proclamation, issued in 1936 by Travancore's ruler, Sree Chithira Thirunal Balaramavarma, allowed people of all castes to access this temple.

In 1930, the British imposed severe restrictions on the manufacture of salt and imposed large tariffs on the populace. The people of Kerala and the entire country were enraged by this under K. Kelappan's leadership. At Payannur, where salt was made, there was resistance to the legislation. Hundreds of agitators were arrested after salt regulations were broken in many places, especially in Payyannur and Kozhikode. K. Madhavan Nair participated in each of these state-wide uprisings, as did other prominent figures including K.P. Kesava Menon, Mohammad Abdurahiman, etc.

The Travancore liberation struggle had a very different nature. In Travancore, caste groups had a big impact. These groups promoted social justice and sufficient representation of under-represented groups in the legislative and governance within the city borders. T.K. Madhavan, T.M. Varghese, C. Kesavan, and Pattom Thanu Pillai were among the prominent leaders of the newly formed Travancore State Congress. Its members battled for the state's citizens' rights, which had been infringed upon during British administration. Ikkanda Warrier and Panampilly Govinda Menon, both of whom were born in Cochin, had a significant impact on the creation of Cochin Praja Mandalam.

The Malabar District was not devoid of adherents of the Home Rule Movement. The Secretary of both the Congress Committee and the Home Rule League was K.P. Kesava Menon. His political activities galvanized the entire Malabar district. In Malabar, the national movement experienced a surge in support and influence during the First World War. Concurrently, the Muslim populace of Malabar was incensed by the Khilafat movement. The Malabar rebellion of 1921 stood as the most significant occurrence associated with the political movement in Malabar to this time. 61 of the 90 Mapillas who were being transported as captives in a closed railway goods wagon from Tirur to Coimbatore perished of suffocation during the Wagon Tragedy,one of the tragic events associated with this rebellion. The insurrection of 1921 constituted a significant national unrest that challenged the authority of the British.

The Congress personnel appeared to have been dormant in the immediate aftermath of the uprising. In contrast, few other Congress employees, including K. P. Kesava Menon, established the Mathrubhumi, a Malayalam daily based in Calicut, with the intention of disseminating the Congress's message. The Salt Satyagraha, which commenced in 1930 under the guidance of Gandhiji, also influenced the state of Kerala. The Salt Sathyagraha in Malabar primarily took place in Payyannur. Long after this, Malabar eventually emerged as the focal point of nationwide movements in Kerala.

The British government regarded the Congress as a "illegitimate organization" during the Second Phase of the Civil Disobedience Movement in 1932. The participation of thousands of men and women in the agitation in Malabar rendered the government's threats futile. The withdrawal of the Civil Disobedience Movement was followed by a schism in the Congress Party viz. including both leftists and rightists. The Communist Party of Malabar was established in 1939 from the Congress party's radical faction. They abandoned the Gandhian Principles after being inspired by the Russian Revolution. However, they opposed the foreign government in solidarity with the Congress.

The Congress persisted in its ardent pursuit of liberty following the conclusion of the Second World War. Even subsequent to its liberation in August 1947, Malabar remained an administrative region of the Madras state. The Madras Legislature was augmented by four seats won by the Congress Party of Malabar in the general election of 1951. The state reorganization that occurred on November 1, 1956 resulted in the creation of Kerala, a new state formed by the merger of Travancore, Cochin, and Malabar.

=== Travancore-Cochin Period (1947-1956) ===
During the early British colonial period, the princely states of Travancore and Cochin engaged in internal conflicts and demonstrations to advocate for the rights of their respective populations. The initial agitations were directed toward the implementation of effective governance. Subsequently, an ongoing resistance emerged in pursuit of political rights, encompassing the representation and participation of individuals at every level of government.

Shri. Kesavappillai, a representative from Trivandrum, attended the inaugural session of Congress that was convened in Bombay on December 28, 1885. Travancore had a modest representation in the early years of Congress formation at the national level. Barrister G.P Pillai established the Malayalee Memorial in 1891 to advocate for the rights of locals in government service. The Congress convention held in Amaravati was presided over by Shri. C. Sankaran Nair in 1897. A branch of the Congress was established in Trivandrum in 1929, and the party unit's secretary was Barrister A.K Pillai. In the same year that the KPCC was established in Ottapalam, Later in 1921, Riverdrum also established a congress committee.

Travancore was immediately affected by the civil disobedience movements that Gandhiji initiated in 1920. The state's Congress Committee coordinated demonstrations, processions, and a boycott of British products. Travancore experienced one of its most turbulent political unrest periods in its history during the early 1930s. Commencing as a form of resistance against the constitutional reforms implemented in 1932, the Nivarthana movement emerged. The agitation ultimately resulted in success, notwithstanding the repressive measures implemented by the government. Precise deliberations were conducted regarding each community in response to the agitation.

The Travancore State Congress was established in 1938. Presided over initially was Pattom Thanu Pillai. The State Congress also included notable figures such as Kesavan, P. K. Kunju, and T.M. Varghese. The objective of the nascent organization was to secure a government that was entirely accountable to the citizens of Travancore.In Travancore, the Quit India Movement failed to elicit any violent opposition. However, the political landscape of Travancore became overshadowed by ominous clouds during the postwar era. The proposal for constitutional reforms put forth by Sir C. P. Ramaswamy Iyer in January 1946 included the establishment of an irrevocable executive branch, inspired by the "American model." The State Congress deemed the proposal to be unlawful and rejected it.

A sequence of extraordinary occurrences that transpired between 1946 and 1947 came to a dramatic conclusion with the establishment of responsible government in Travancore. When did Sir begin in July 1947, C. P. Ramaswamy Iyer declared that Travancore would attain independence on the date of the British withdrawal from India. Both within and without the state, the Diwan's proclamation sparked considerable controversy. The ineffectual application of force by the government in response to the statewide mass movement spearheaded by the Congress party was evident. After the Diwan was assaulted, he departed Travancore and tendered his resignation from office. The state's quest for accountable governance concluded triumphantly with the conclusion of that conflict. Pattom Thanu Pillai, T. M. Varghese, established the first well-known ministry in Travancore. March 24, 1948 marked Kesavan's ascension to authority.

=== Post- Kerala Formation Period (1956 Onwards) ===
The national freedom movement significantly influenced the political history of Kerala. Here, an echo of the Salt Satyagraha was heard. The entrance of lower castes into the Vaikom temple via a Satyagraha was acknowledged as a direct challenge to the rulers' and, by extension, the British occupation's prevailing political and hierarchical supremacy. In addition to Gandhiji's physical presence, numerous Congress-led people's movements contributed to the Kerala national movement against the British. As a result of their leadership in various political movements opposing British rule, Congress ultimately transformed the freedom struggle in the state into a struggle for the rights of the state's people, particularly millions of impoverished and marginalized individuals, which had been violated.

The inaugural general election for the State Legislature of Kerala took place in February 1957. A handful of independent candidates and the Communist Party of India secured 65 of the 126 seats in the legislature. The Communist Ministry was established under the Chief Minister of Kerala on April 5, 1957, following the end of Presidents Rule. The authority was seized by E.M. S. Namboothiripad. Opposition arose in every region of the state in response to the Communist Government's anti-people policies and ruthless methods of cell rule. This resulted in countless agitations throughout the state, ultimately culminating in the regime's overthrow in 1959. Kerala once more was placed under the presidency.

Kerala State Legislature elections were re-conducted in February 1960. In opposition to the Communist Party, the Congress, the P.S.P., and the Muslim League formed an alliance. The Congress-P.S.P coalition established a ministry with Pattom subsequent to the alliance's triumph. The swearing-in of Chief Minister Pattom A. Thanu Pillai on February 22, 1960 marked the conclusion of President's Rule. Pattom was resigned in September,1962. Governor of the state of Punjab, Pattom A. Thanu Pillai, was appointed to the position. R. Sankar,the chief of the Congress Party, was appointed as the Chief Minister. The ministry tendered its resignation on September 10, 1964. Kerala State once more came under the governance of the President subsequent to the downfall of the Sankar Ministry. The Marxist Communist Party's division within the Communist Party was the most significant political development of the era.

All political parties, including Congress, ran independently in the 1965 midterm elections, lacking any electoral alliance. Thus, in the new legislature, none of the parties received a clear majority of representatives. President's Rule was instituted in Kerala on March 24, 1965, subsequent to the dissolution of the recently elected Legislative Assembly.

Elected to power in the General Election of 1967 under the leadership of E. M.S. Namboothiripad, was the Communist Party. Nonetheless, this ministry was overthrown in October 1969, and on November 1, 1969, a new non-Marxist coalition ministry was inaugurated under the leadership of C. Achutha Menon, the leader of the C.P.I. The Congress party was among this front's principal allies.

In order to pursue a new mandate, the Achutha Menon Ministry tendered its resignation on August 1, 1970. A unified front led jointly by the Communist Party of India and the Indian National Congress won an overwhelming majority in the September 1970 General Election. A newly established ministry led by C. Achutha Menon attained to power . Nevertheless, the general elections that were scheduled to occur in Kerala in 1976 were rescheduled subsequent to the President of India's proclamation of Emergency in June 1975.

During the period of emergency, the Congress party supported Indira Gandhi, and Kerala experienced a remarkably tranquil political and social climate. March 1977 saw the convening of general elections subsequent to the withdrawal of the Emergency. The elections were won by a coalition led by the Congress. March 23, 1977 marked the inauguration of a new ministry led by K. Karunakaran, the chief of the Congress Legislature Party. A month later, the Chief Minister was compelled to tender his resignation, putting an end to the Karunakaran Ministry. Following the collapse of the Karunakaran Ministry, a new ministry led by A.K. Antony was established. This ministry occupied power between 1977 and 1978. P.K. Vasudevan Nair presided over the newly established Ministry that commenced operations on October 29, 1978. Under the leadership of P.K. Vasudevan Nair, the C.P.I. remained in power until October 12, 1979. Another Ministry, which was led by the leader of the Muslim League, C.H. Mohammad Koya. In 1979, Muhammad Koya was in office between October 12 and December 5. On December 5, 1979, following the resignation of the Koya ministry, President's Rule was proclaimed. In January 1980, elections for the Legislative Assembly were conducted. The Ministry of the Democratic Front on the left, led by E.K. Nayanar, the chairman of the Marxists, assumed office on January 25, 1980.

On October 20, 1981, the Nayanar Ministry was deposed as a result of the Congress group's cessation of support; Kerala was once more placed under President's Rule. K. established a new ministry under the Congress. December 25 marked the inauguration of Karunakaran. However, his survival was short-lived. An additional period of President's Rule was imposed in Kerala between March 17 and May 23, 1982.

The Congress-led United Democratic Front, which won the general elections for the Kerala Assembly in May 1982, assumed power on May 24, 1982, with K. Mr. Karunakaran is the Chief Minister. It maintained its position for an entire term. The Kerala Legislative Assembly general election in March 1987 resulted in the United Democratic Front's defeat. On March 25, 1987, the L.D.F ministry, led by C.P.M leader E.K. Nayanar, assumed power in Kerala. The ministry was dissolved by the Chief Minister in 1991, and he was presented with a new mandate prior to the customary conclusion of his term in office. The party U.D.F., which was headed by Congress, seized power. K. Karunakaran was installable as chief minister. Kirunakaran tendered his resignation on March 16, 1995, while A.K. Twenty-first March 1995 saw Antony's inauguration as the new chief minister. May of that year witnessed the occurrence of general elections in 1996. With a simple majority, the LDF reestablished itself as the ministry's leader under E.K. Nayanar assumed authority. He resigned at the end of his term, followed by Shri, after the Congress-led UDF won an overwhelming victory in the 2001 assembly elections (100 out of 140 seats).

On May 18, 2011, Oommen Chandy's UDF government took office. Seven of the Cabinet's 20 overall members began serving on May 18; the remaining members were sworn in on May 23 following a meeting with UDF member parties. In the assembly election held on April 13, 2011, Oommen Chandy's UDF narrowly defeated the LDF with 68 members, earning 72 seats overall.

== Timeline ==
- 1921 – Kerala Pradesh Congress Committee convened at Ottapalam in northern Kerala.
- 1924/25 – Vaikom Satyagraha led by Congress leaders T. K. Madhavan, K. Kelappan and K. P. Kesava Menon.
- 1930 – Salt Satyagraha, a part of the Civil Disobedience Movement, organised by K. Kelappan in northern Kerala.
- 1931/32 – Guruvayur Satyagraha, commenced under K. Kelappan.
- 1933 – Joint Political Congress established in Travancore.
- 1938 – Chunangat Kunjikavamma elected as President and E. M. S. Namboodiripad, the future Communist leader, as Secretary.
- 1938 – formation of Travancore State Congress. Agitation against Diwan C. P. Ramaswami Iyer for 'Responsible Government'.
- 1939/40 – Split in Congress. Communist Party of India walked away with the entire Kerala unit.
- 1947 – Following the Punnapra-Vayalar Revolt, the Travancore State Congress enters the agitation against the Diwan.
- 1957 – Congress loses first assembly election in Kerala
- 1958 – formation of the Kerala Students Union (KSU).
- 1960 – Congress-led alliance in power after the 'Liberation Struggle' against Communist ministry.
- 1964 – Major split in Congress.
- 1971 – Congress joins the Achuta Menon Government.
- 1979/80 – Congress leader K. Karunakaran forms the UDF alliance.

=== Gandhi's visits to Kerala ===
1. 1920 (during the Non-Cooperation/Khilafat Agitation)
2. 1925 (during Vaikom Satyagraha)
3. 1927 (campaign against the untouchability)
4. 1934 (fundraising)
5. 1937 (after the 1936 Temple Entry Proclamation)

== Headquarters ==
The Headquarters of the Kerala Pradesh Congress Committee is currently situated at Indira Bhavan, Thiruvanathapuram.

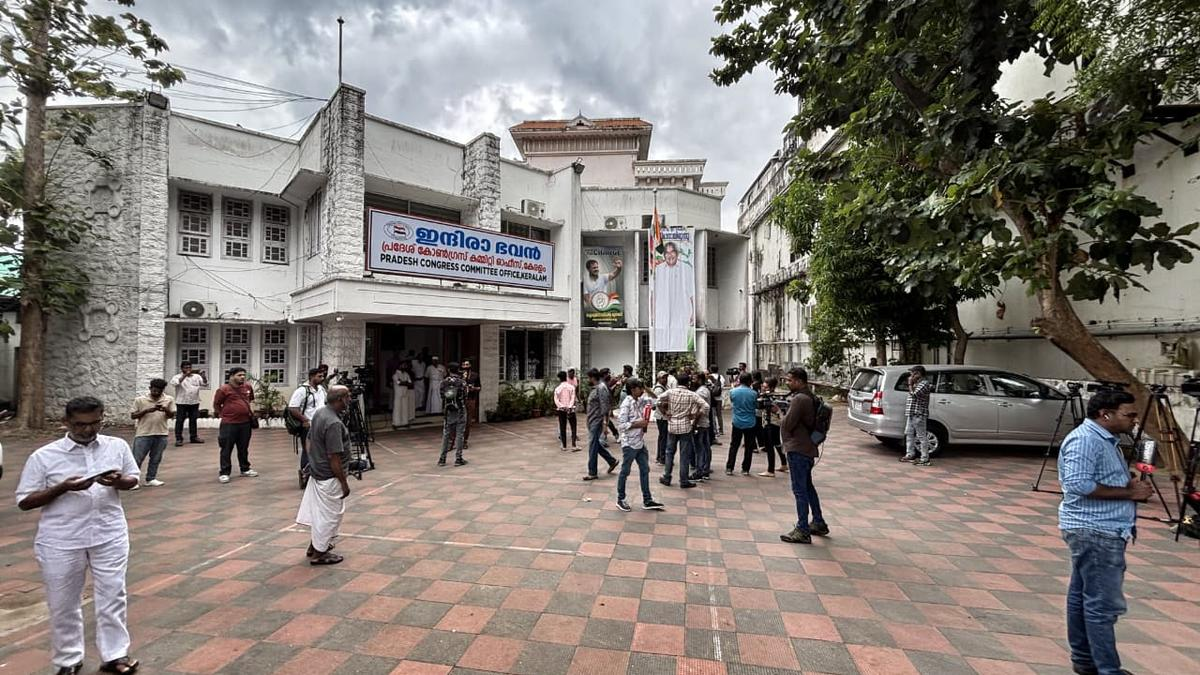

== Kerala Legislative Assembly election ==
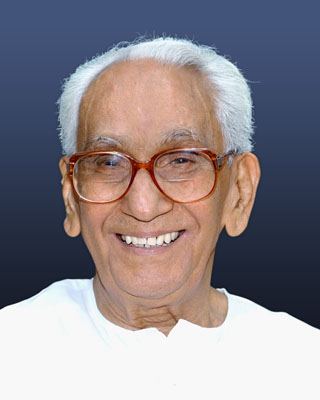
K. Karunakaran

Source: Thomas J. Nossiter - Communism in Kerala: A Study in Political Adaptation (1982)

Year	Party leader	Seats won / Total Seats in Assembly	Seats won / Seats Contested	Change in seats	Outcome
Travancore-Cochin
1952	A. J. John	44 / 108	44 / 108	▲ new	Government
1954	A. J. John	45 / 117	45 / 117	▲1	Opposition
Kerala
1957	P. T. Chacko	43 / 126	43 / 126	▲ new	Opposition
1960	R. Sankar	63 / 126	63 / 126	▲20	Government with PSP
1965	R. Sankar	36 / 133	36 / 133	▼27	Opposition
1967	K. Karunakaran	9 / 133	9 / 133	▼27	Opposition
1970	K. Karunakaran	30 / 133	30 / 133	▲21	Government UF
1977	K. Karunakaran	38 / 140	38 / 140	▲8	Government UF
1980	K. Karunakaran	17 / 140	17 / 140	▼21	Opposition UDF
1982	K. Karunakaran	20 / 140	20 / 140	▲3	Government UDF
1987	K. Karunakaran	33 / 140	33 / 76	▲13	Opposition UDF
1991	K. Karunakaran	55 / 140	55 / 91	▲22	Government UDF
1996	A. K. Antony	37 / 140	37 / 94	▼18	Opposition UDF
2001	A. K. Antony	63 / 140	63 / 88	▲26	Government UDF
2006	Oommen Chandy	24 / 140	24 / 77	▼39	Opposition UDF
2011	Oommen Chandy	38 / 140	38 / 82	▲14	Government UDF
2016	Oommen Chandy	22 / 140	22 / 87	▼16	Opposition UDF
2021	Ramesh Chennithala	21 / 140	21 / 92	▼1	Opposition UDF
2026	V. D. Satheesan	63 / 140	63 / 92	▲42	Government UDF

Source: Government of Kerala Government of India

Kerala Congress Legislative Assembly seat count

== Kerala Lok Sabha Performance ==
Lok Sabha Elections
Year	Lok Sabha	Seats contested	Seats won / Total Seats in Kerala	Seats won / Total Seats contested	(+/-) in seats	% of votes	Vote swing	Popular vote	Outcome
1951	1st	11	6 / 12	6 / 11	New entry	35.08%	New entry	12,24,533	Government
1957	2nd	17	6 / 18	6 / 17	Steady	34.76%		21,02,883	Government
1962	3rd	14	6 / 18	6 / 14	Steady	34.28%		18,95,226	Government
1967	4th	19	1 / 19	1 / 19	▼5	36.15%		22,67,393	Government
1971	5th	7	6 / 20	6 / 7	▲5	19.75%		12,89,601	Government
1977	6th	11	11 / 20	11 / 11	▲5	29.13%		25,79,745	Opposition
1980	7th	11	5 / 20	5 / 11	▼6	26.32%		21,50,186	Government
1984	8th	13	13 / 20	13 / 13	▲8	33.27%		36,24,315	Government
1989	9th	17	14 / 20	14 / 17	▲1	41.70%		62,18,850	Opposition
1991	10th	16	13 / 20	13 / 16	▼1	38.77%		55,26,187	Government
1996	11th	17	7 / 20	7 / 17	▼6	38.01%		54,67,132	Opposition
1998	12th	17	8 / 20	8 / 17	▲1	38.67%		57,46,566	Opposition
1999	13th	17	8 / 20	8 / 17	Steady	39.35%		60,51,905	Opposition
2004	14th	17	0 / 20	0 / 17	▼8	32.13%		48,46,637	Government
2009	15th	17	13 / 20	13 / 17	▲13	40.13%		64,34,486	Government
2014	16th	15	8 / 20	8 / 15	▼5	31.10%		55,90,285	Opposition
2019	17th	16	15 / 20	15 / 16	▲7	37.46%		75,96,610	Opposition
2024	18th	16	14 / 20	14 / 16	▼1	35.06%		70,03,971	Opposition

== List of Chief Ministers ==
Source: Thomas J. Nossiter - Communism in Kerala: A Study in Political Adaptation (1982)

S.no	Name	Portrait	Term		
1.	R. Sankar		26 September 1962	10 September 1964	1 year, 350 days
2.	K. Karunakaran		25 March 1977	27 April 1977	8 years, 324 days
2.	K. Karunakaran		28 December 1981	17 March 1982	8 years, 324 days
2.	K. Karunakaran		24 May 1982	26 March 1987	8 years, 324 days
2.	K. Karunakaran		24 June 1991	22 March 1995	8 years, 324 days
3.	A. K. Antony		27 April 1977	29 October 1978	5 years, 350 days
3.	A. K. Antony		22 March 1995	20 May 1996	5 years, 350 days
3.	A. K. Antony		17 May 2001	31 August 2004	5 years, 350 days
4.	Oommen Chandy		31 August 2004	18 May 2006	6 years, 267 days
4.	Oommen Chandy		18 May 2011	25 May 2016	6 years, 267 days
5.	V. D. Satheesan		18 May 2026	Incumbent	139 days

== List of Leaders of Opposition ==
S.no	Name	Portrait	Term	
1.	P. T. Chacko		1957	1959
2.	K. Karunakaran		1967	1969
2.	K. Karunakaran		1978	1979
2.	K. Karunakaran		1980	1981
2.	K. Karunakaran		1987	1991
3.	A. K. Antony		1996	2001
4.	Oommen Chandy		2006	2011
5.	Ramesh Chennithala		2016	2021
6.	V. D. Satheesan		2021	2026

== List of President of Kerala Pradesh Congress Committee ==
S.no	President	Portrait	Term	
1.	K. Madhavan Nair		1920	1921
2.	K. P. Kesava Menon		1921	1925
3.	P. Ramunni Menon		1925	1930
4.	T. Hassan Koya Molla		1930	1931
5.	Ponmadathu Moideen Koya		1931	1934
6.	Chunangat Kunjikavamma		1934	1934
7.	M.P. Narayana Menon		1934	1935
8.	A. V. Kuttimalu Amma		1935	1936
9.	Kongattil Raman Menon		1935	1937
10.	Muhammed Abdurahman Sahib		1938	1940
11.	K. T Kunhiraman Nambiar		1940	1942
12.	P. K Moideen Kutty Sahib		1946	1948
13.	K. Kelappan		1946	1949
14.	Kumbalathu Sanku Pillai		1950	1952
15.	A. P Udayabhanu		1954	1956
16.	Kozhipurath Madhava Menon		1944	1946
16.	Kozhipurath Madhava Menon		1956	1958
17.	K. A. Damodara Menon		1958	1959
18.	R. Sankar		1958	1960
19.	C.K. Govidhavan Nair		1963	1964
20.	K.C. Abraham		1965	1966
21.	T. O. Bava		1967	1969
22.	K.K. Viswanathan		1970	1972
23.	A.K. Antony		1972	1977
24.	S. Varadarajan Nair		1977	1978
25.	K. M. Chandy		1978	1982
26.	C. V. Padmarajan		1983	1987
27.	A.K. Antony		1987	1992
28.	Vayalar Ravi		1992	1998
29.	Thennala Balakrishna Pillai		1998	2001
30.	K. Muraleedharan		2001	2004
31.	P. P. Thankachan		2004	2004
32.	Thennala Balakrishna Pillai		2004	2005
33.	Ramesh Chennithala		2005	2014
34.	V.M. Sudheeran		2014	2017
35.	M.M. Hassan		2017	2018
36.	Mullappally Ramachandran		2018	2021
37.	K. Sudhakaran		2021	2025
38.	Sunny Joseph		2025	2026

== List of INC Presidents from Kerala ==
Serial Name	Name of the President	Year	Session	Image
1.	C. Shankaran Nair	1897	Amaravathi	

== List of Congress Working Committee Members from Kerala ==
Serial No.	Name	Image	Status of Membership
1.	A.K. Antony		Member, CWC
2.	Dr Shashi Tharoor		Member, CWC
3.	K.C. Venugopal		Member, CWC
4.	Ramesh Chennithala		Permanent Invitee, CWC
5.	K. Sudhakaran		Permanent Invitee,CWC
6.	Kodikunnil Suresh		Special Invitee, CWC

== List of Political Affairs Committee Members ==
Serial No.	Name of the member
1	V.D. Satheesan
2	Sunny Joseph
3	Ramesh Chennithala
4	K. Sudhakaran
5	V.M. Sudheeran
6	Mullappally Ramachandran
7	M.M. Hassan
8	Kodikkunnil Suresh
9	Prof. P.J. Kurien
10	Dr. Shashi Tharoor
11	Thiruvanchoor Radhakrishnan
12	K.C. Joseph
13	Benny Behanan
14	Adoor Prakash
15	M.K. Raghavan
16	T.N. Prathapan
17	Anto Antony
18	Hibi Eden
19	P.C. Vishnunath
20	Shanimol Osman
21	M. Liju
22	T. Siddique
23	A.P Anilkumar
24	Roji M. John
25	N. Subramanian
26	Ajay Tharayil
27	V.S. Sivakumar
28	Joseph Vazhackan
29	Cherian Philip
30	Bindhu Krishna
31	Shafi Parambil
32	P.K. Jayalakshmi
33	Johnson Abraham

== District Congress Committee Presidents ==
Sl. No.	District	Name of the DCC President
1	Kasargod	P K Faisal
2	Kannur	Adv. Martin George
3	Kozhikode	Adv. K. Praveenkumar
4	Wayanad	Adv.T.J.Issac
5	Malappuram	V.S.Joy
6	Palakkad	A Thankappan
7	Thrissur	Adv. Joseph Tajet
8	Ernakulam	Mohammed Shiyas
9	Idukki	C P Mathew
10	Kottayam	Nattakam Suresh
11	Alappuzha	Adv.B.Babuprasad
12	Pathanamthitta	Prof. Satheesh Kochuparambil
13	Kollam	P Rajendraprasad
14	Thiruvananthapuram	N Sakthan

== List of elected members ==
=== 16th Kerala legislative assembly 2026 ===
The following members elected to the 16th Kerala Legislative Assembly elections 2026. These members are part of the Congress Legislative Party for the year 2026-2031.

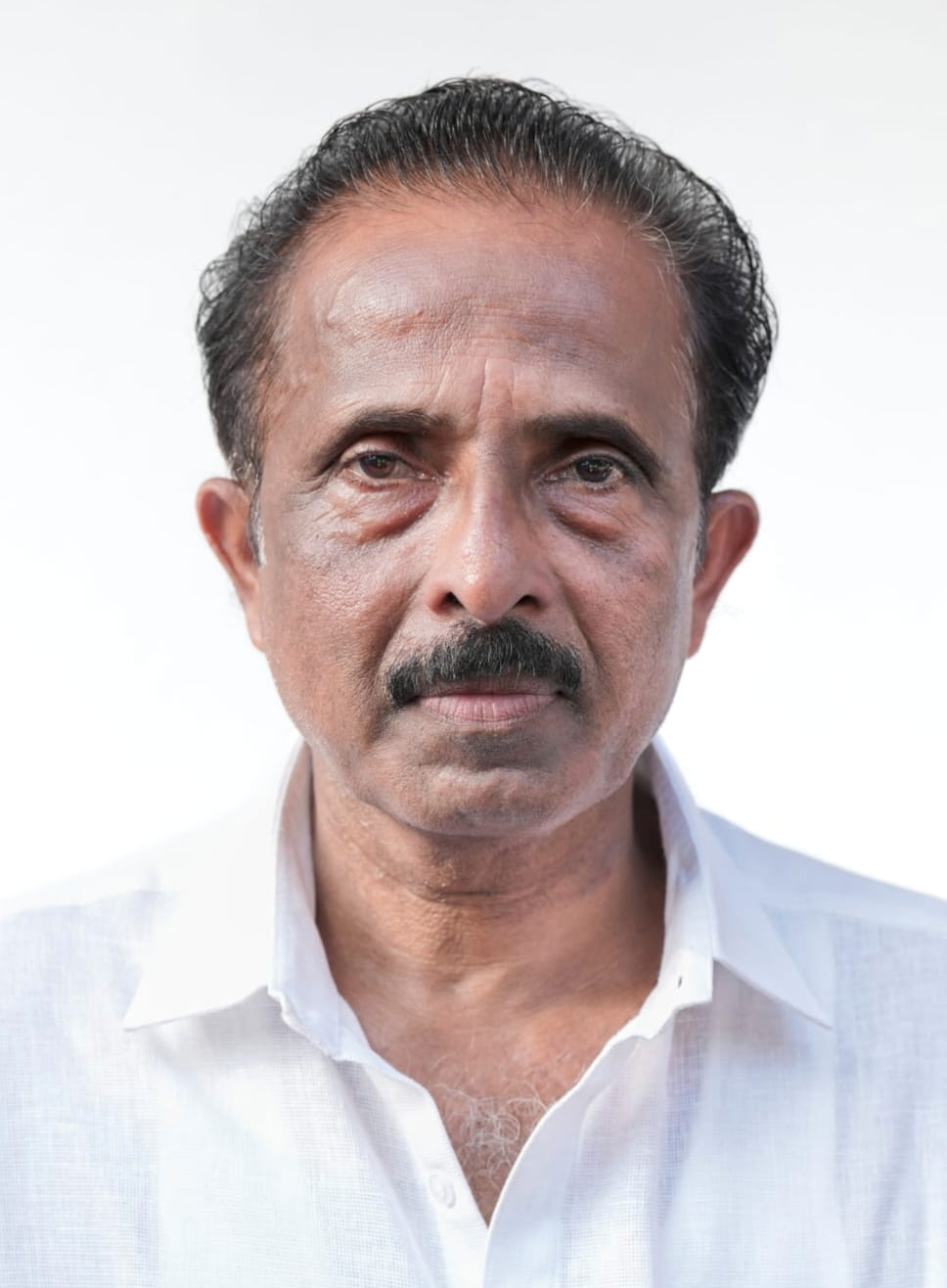
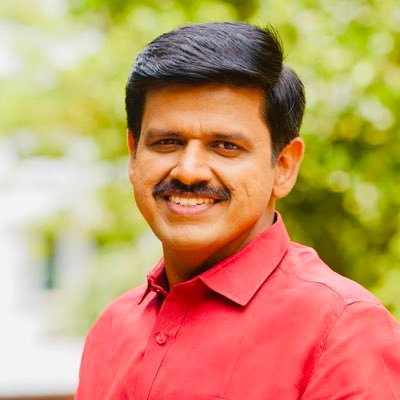
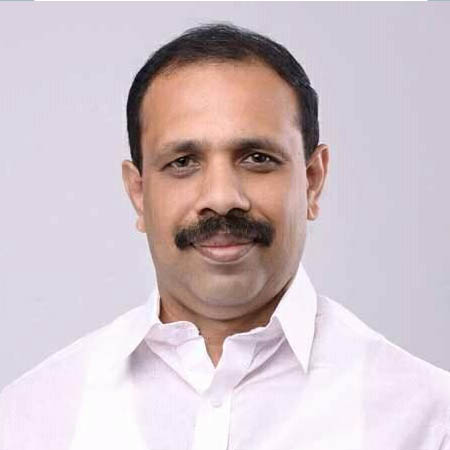
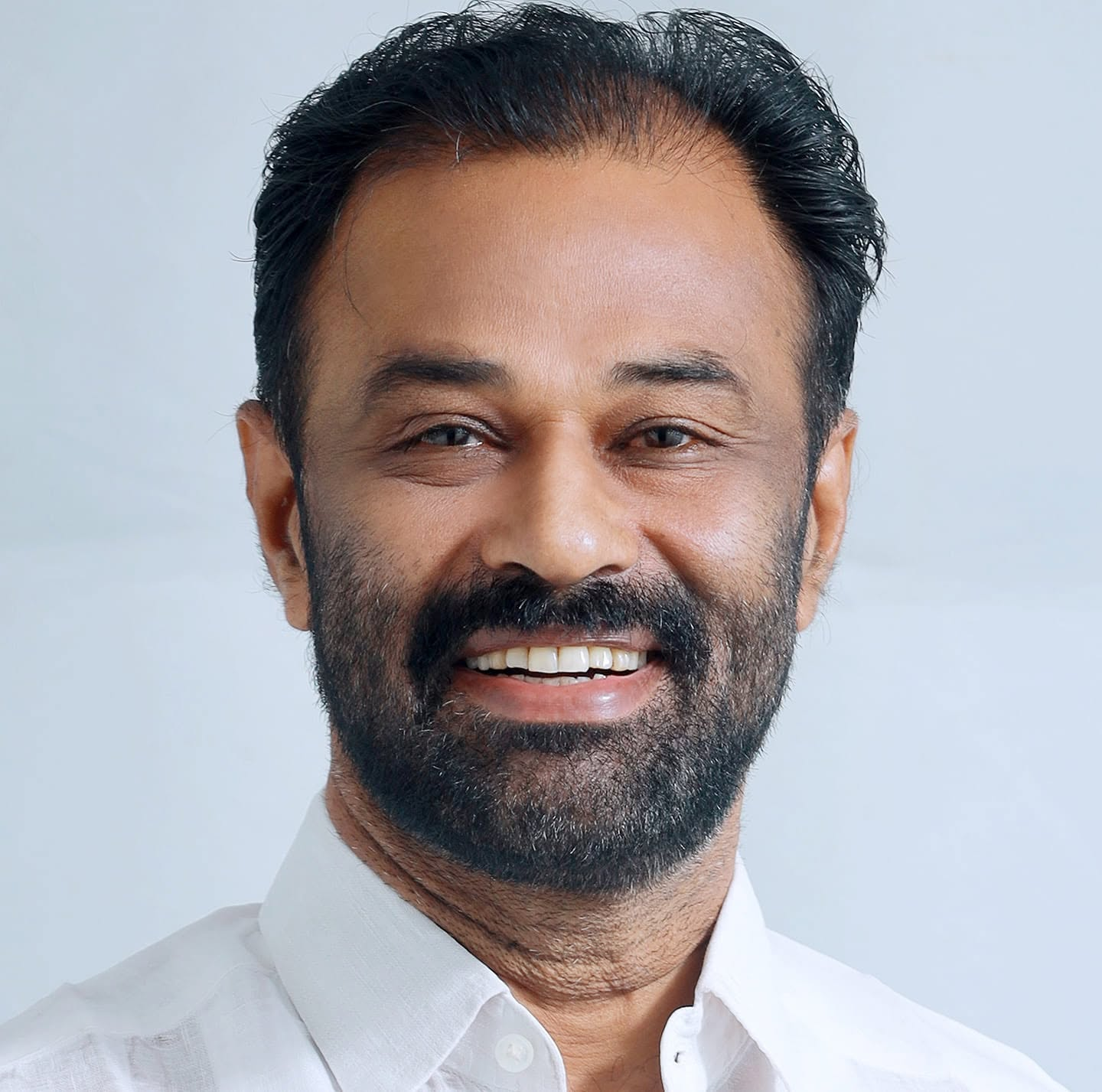
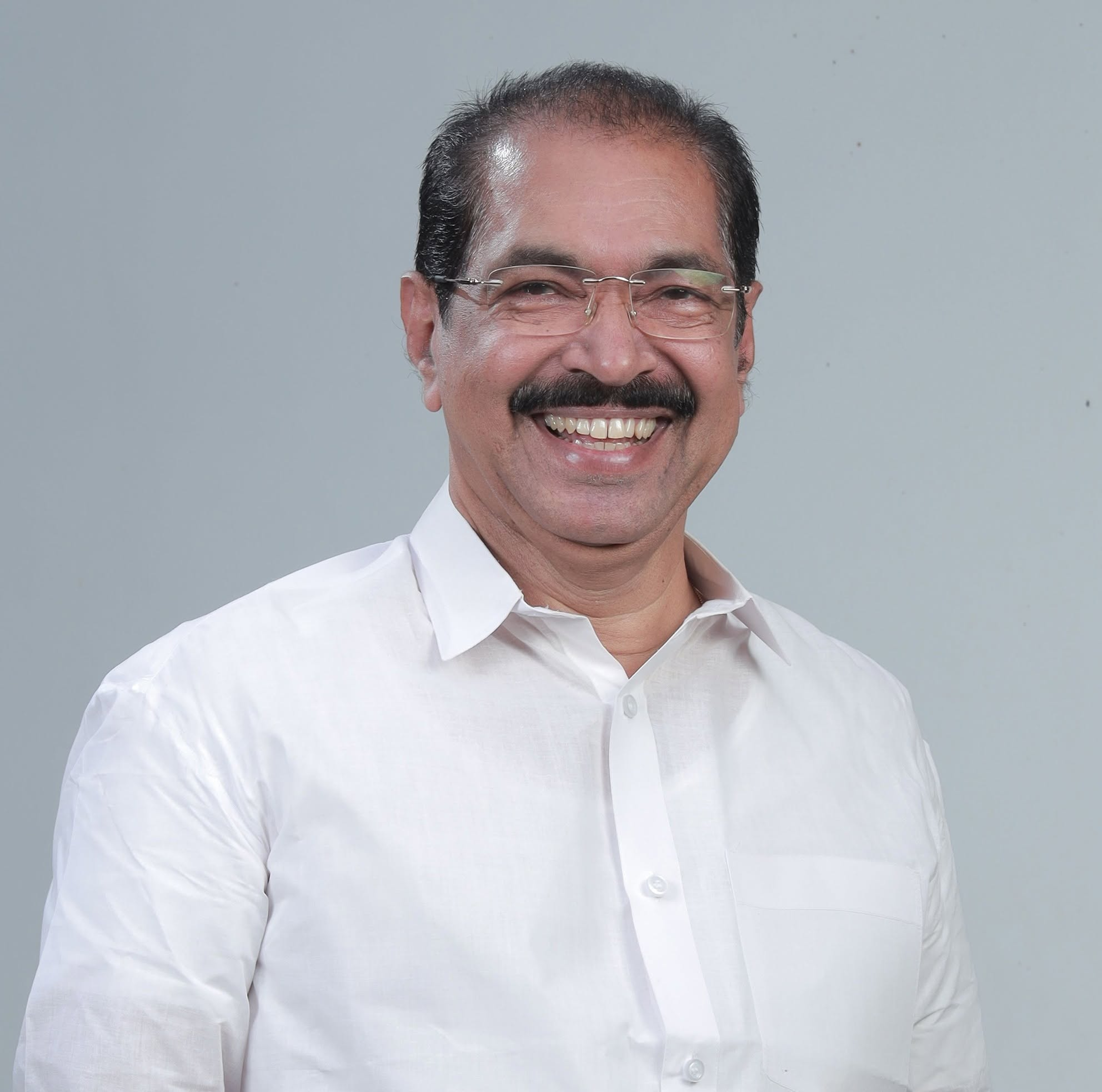
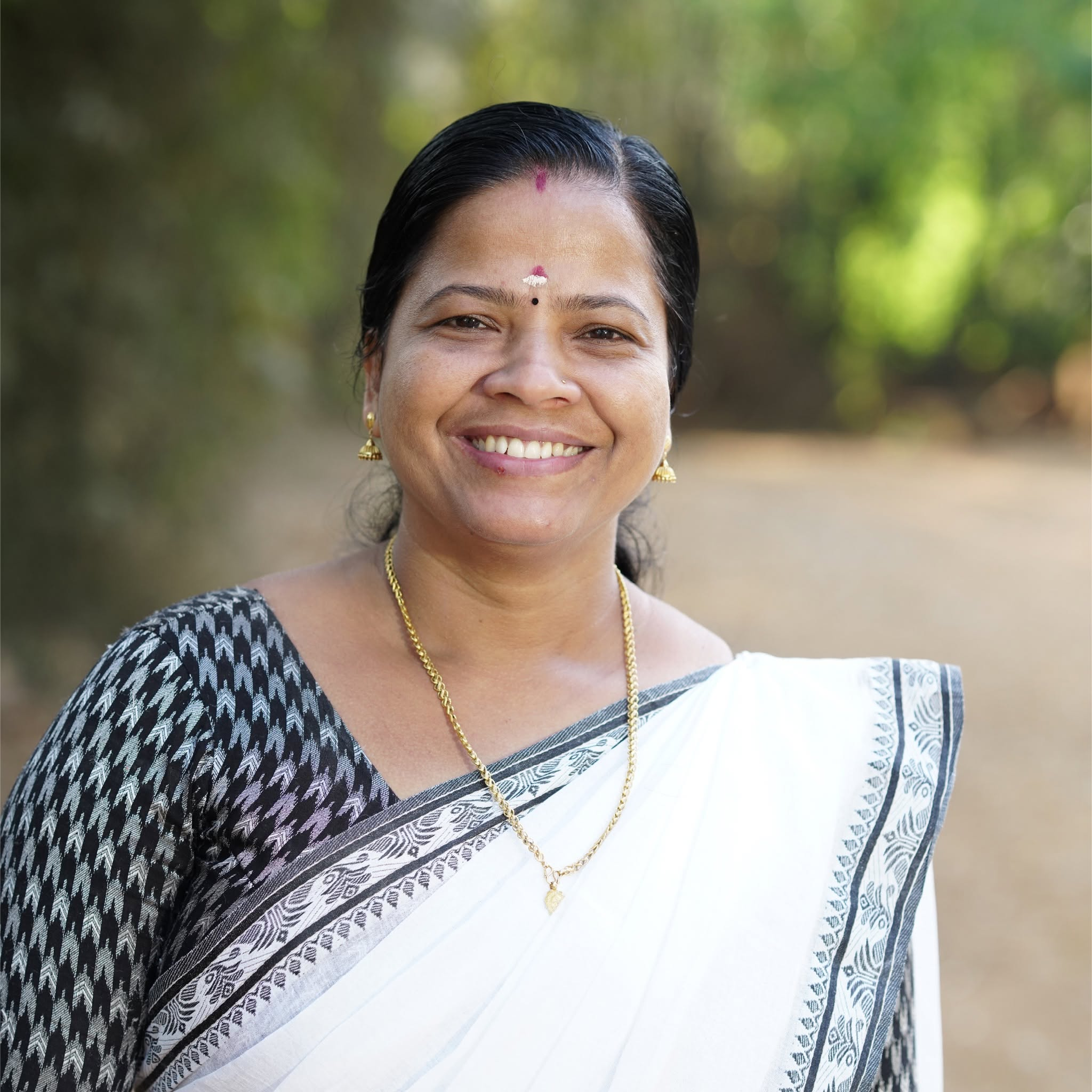
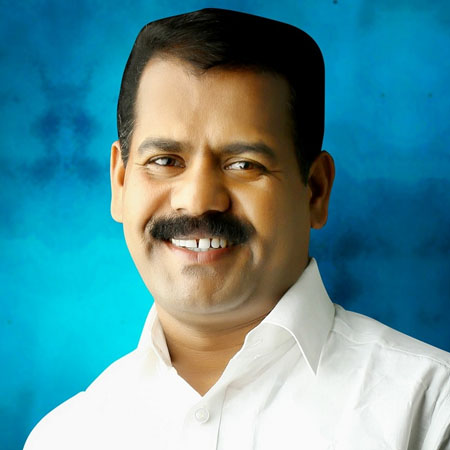
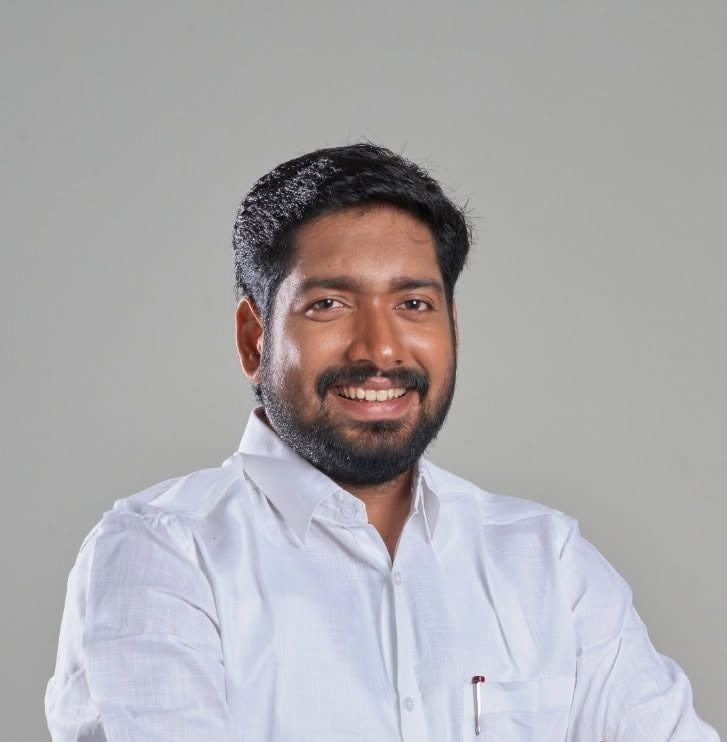
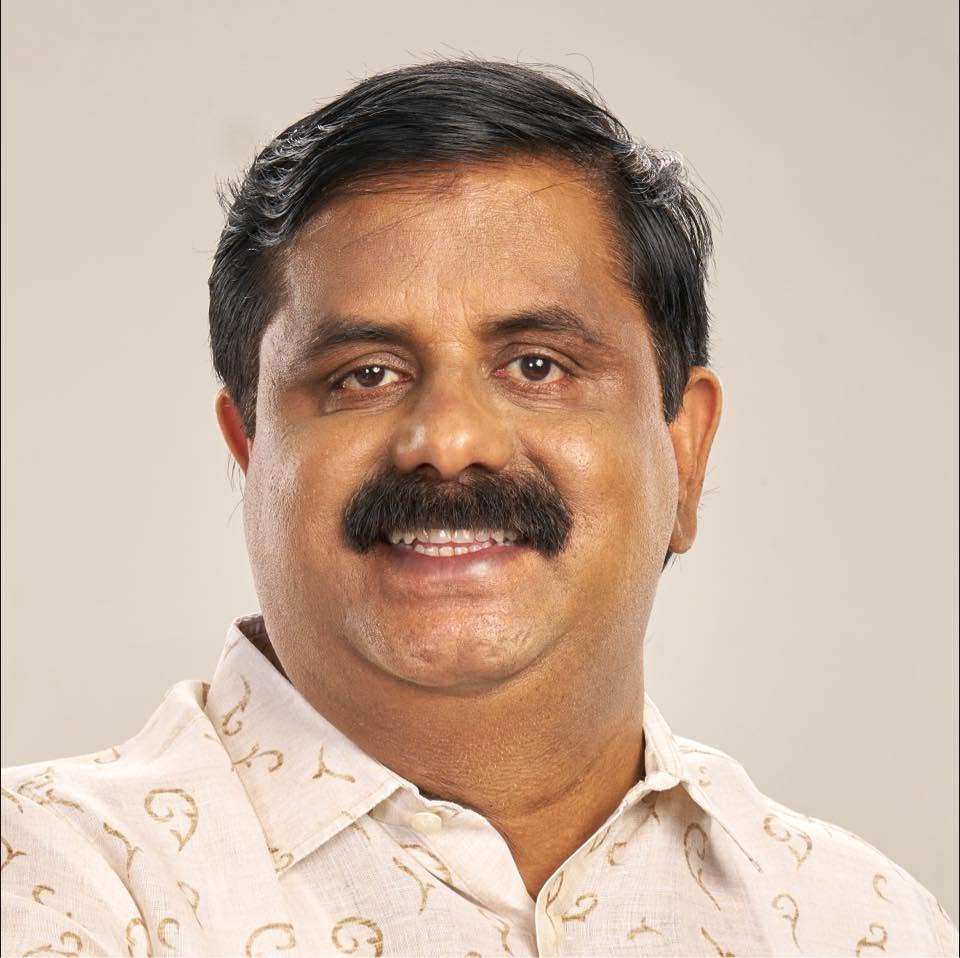
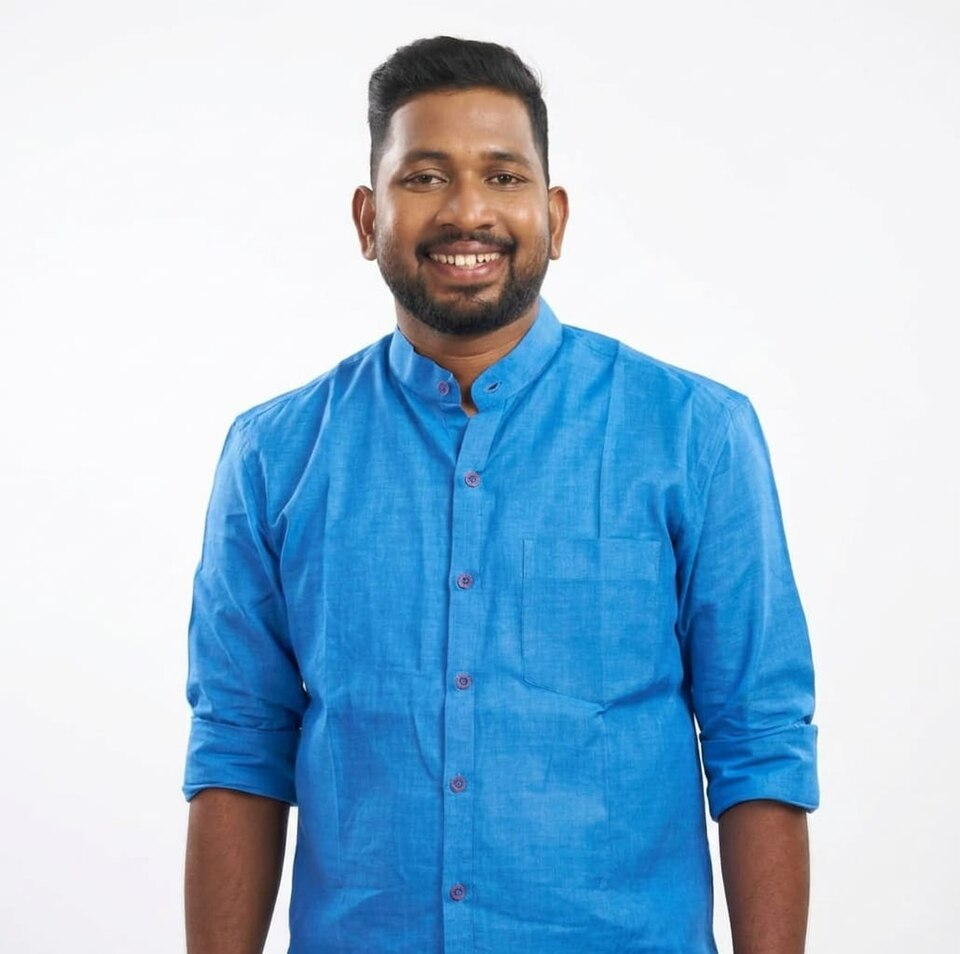
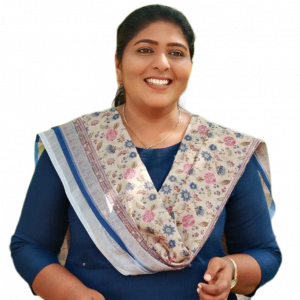
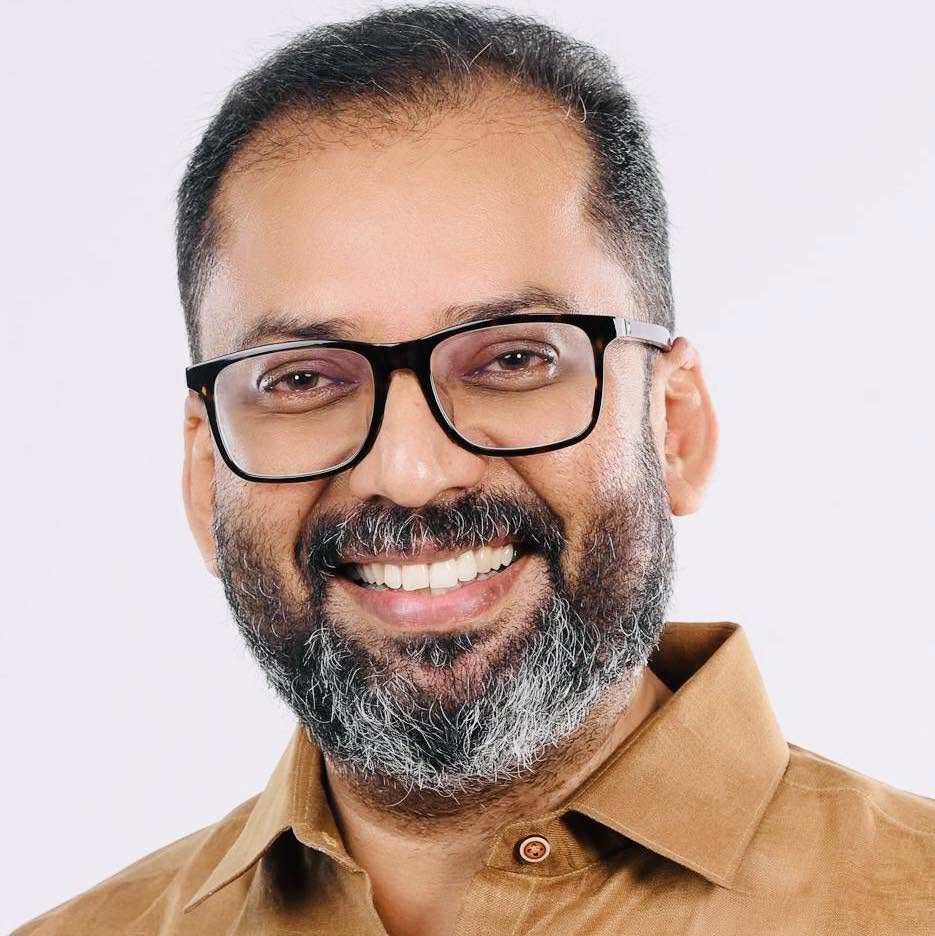
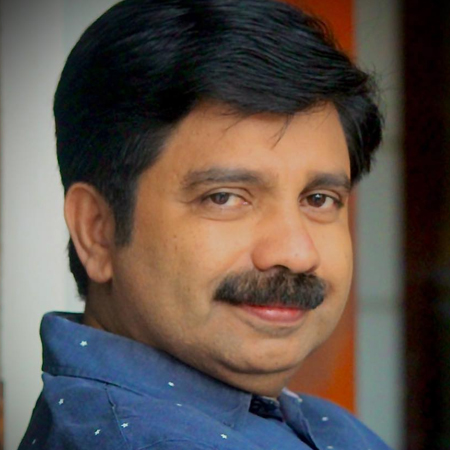
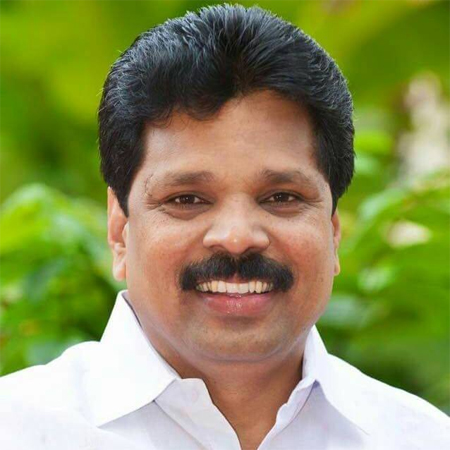
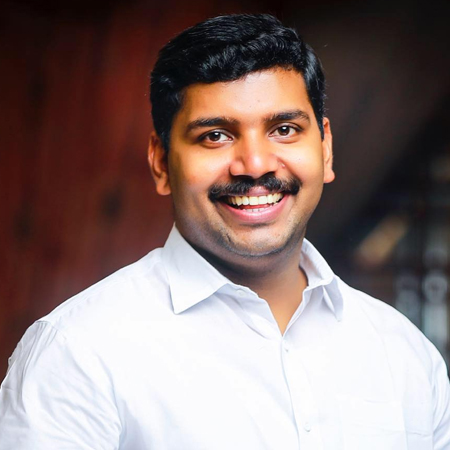
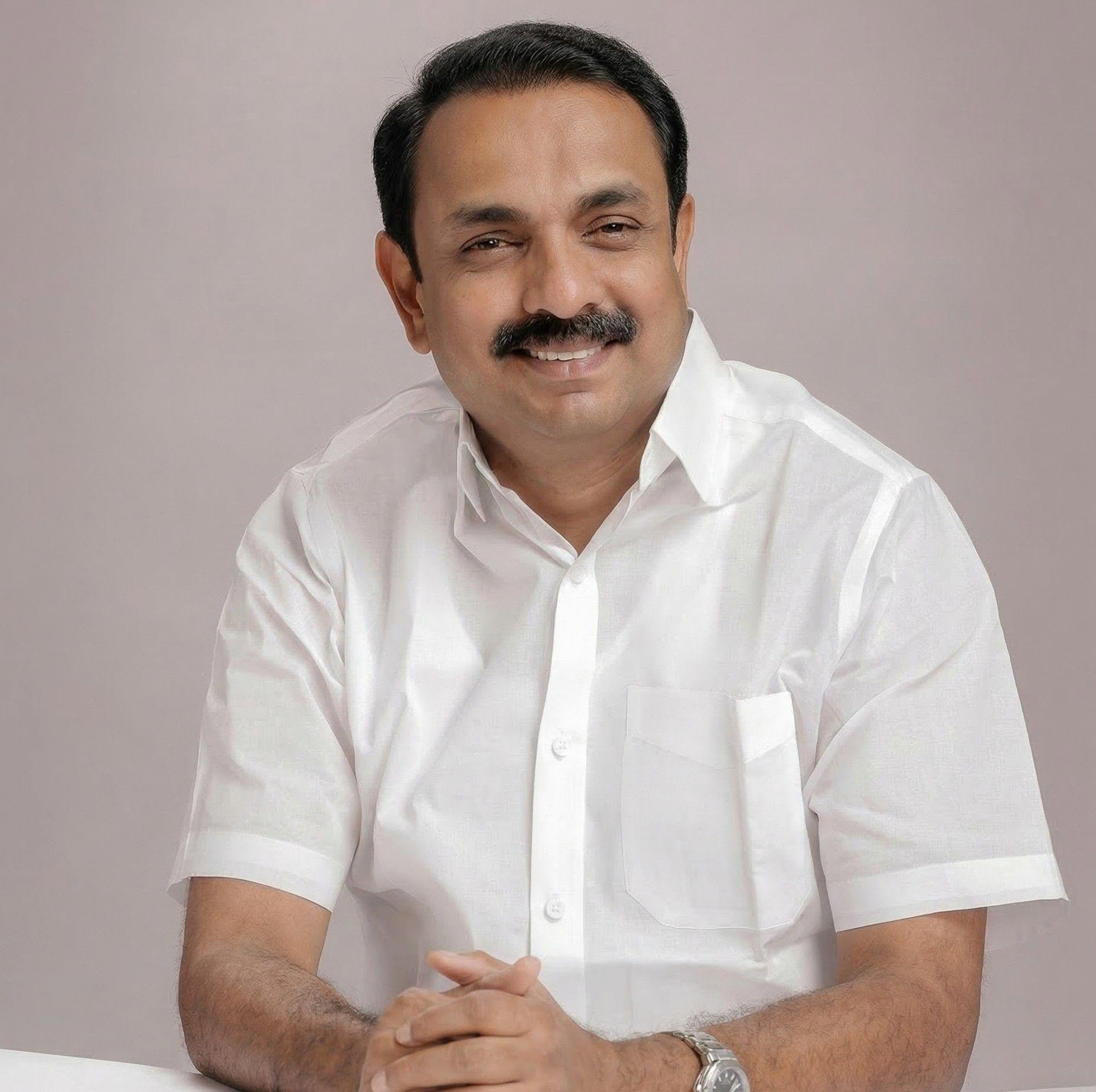
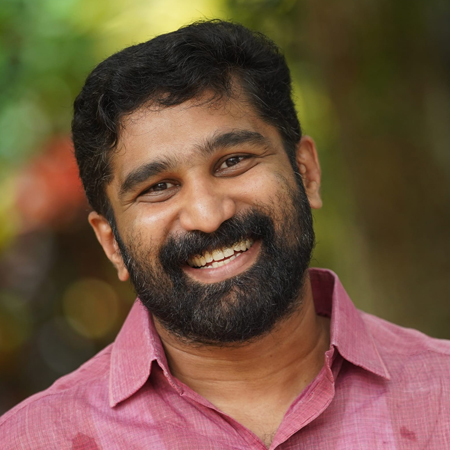
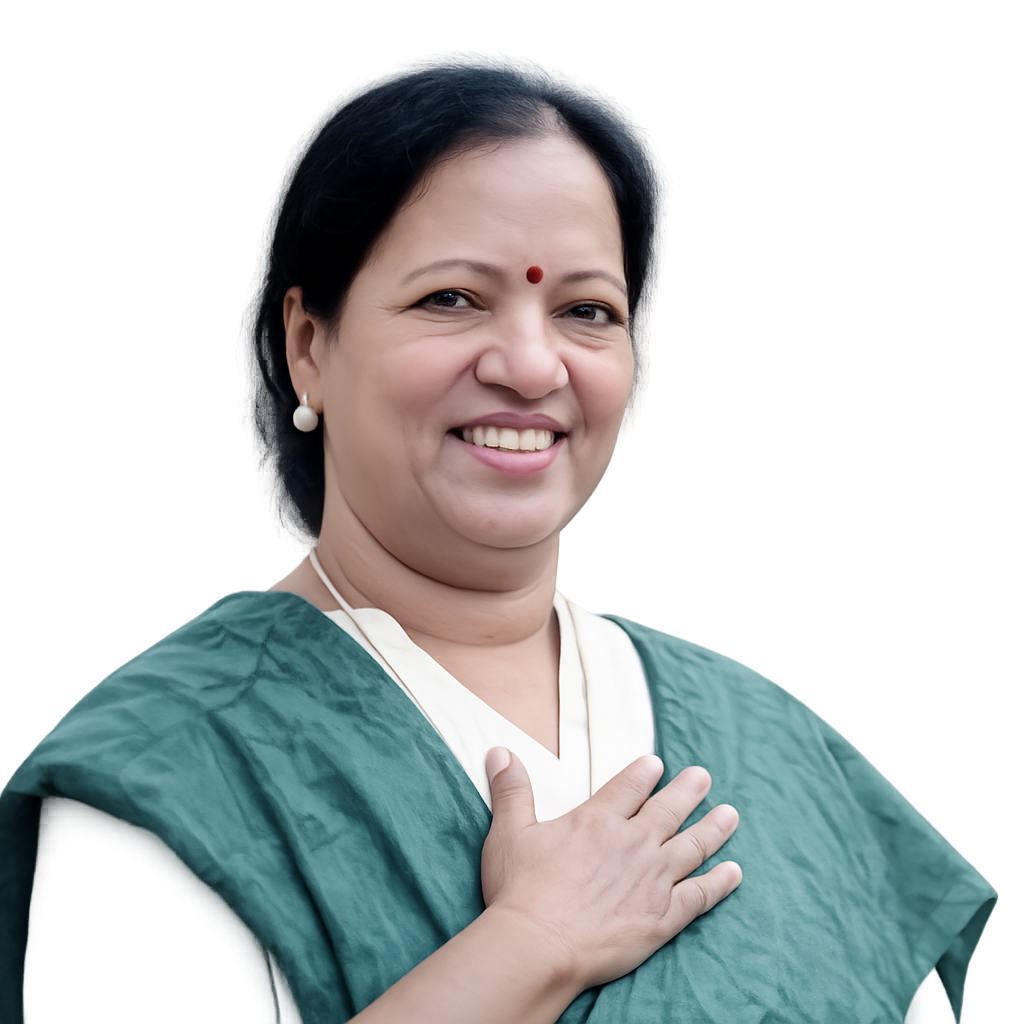
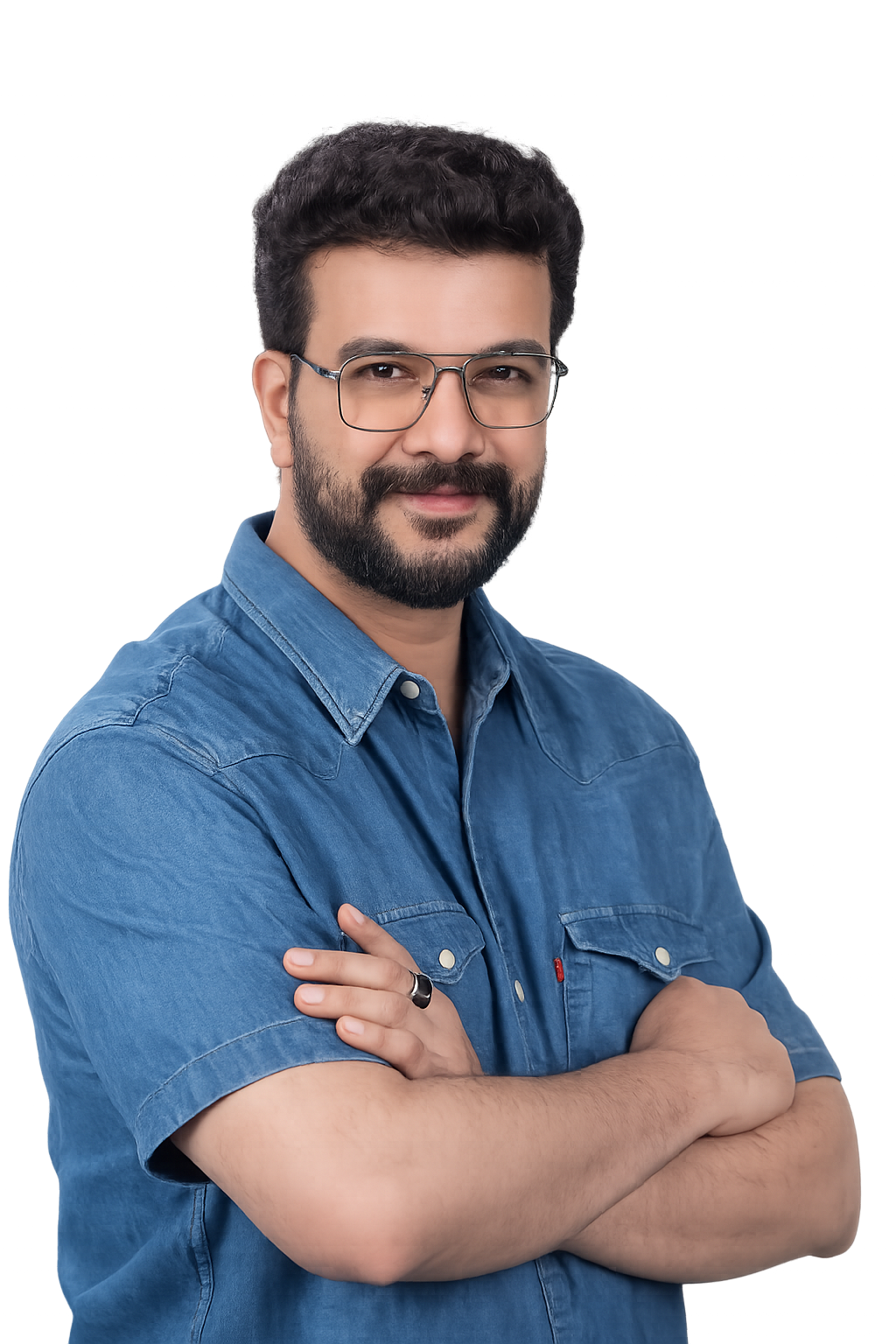
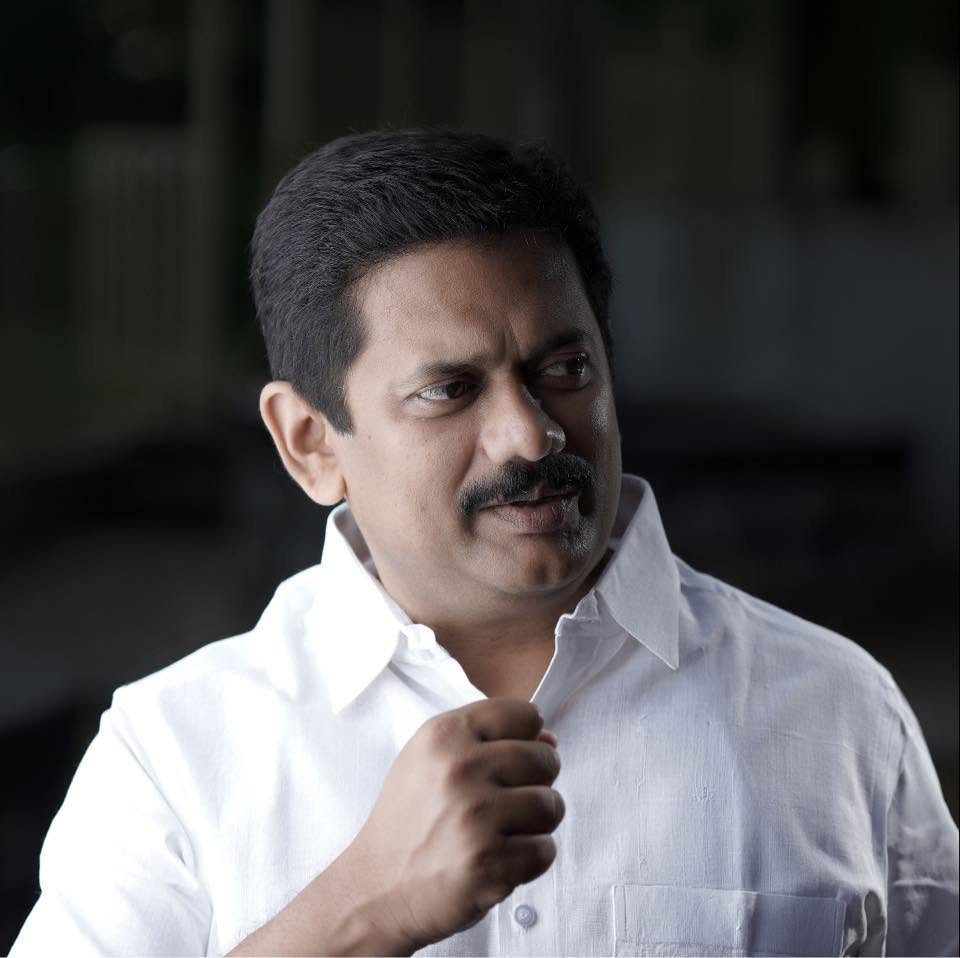
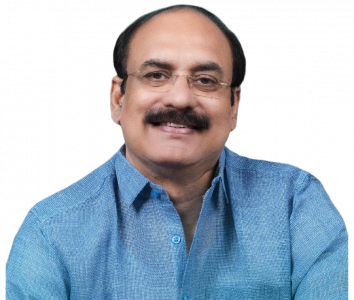
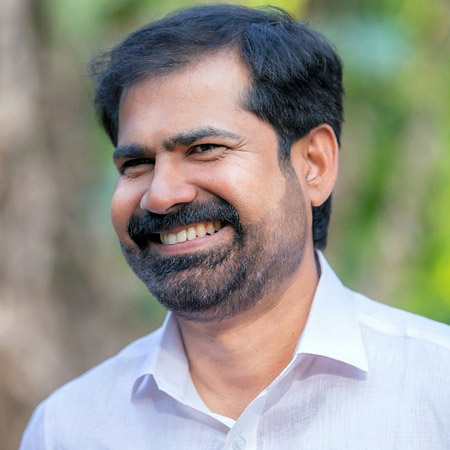
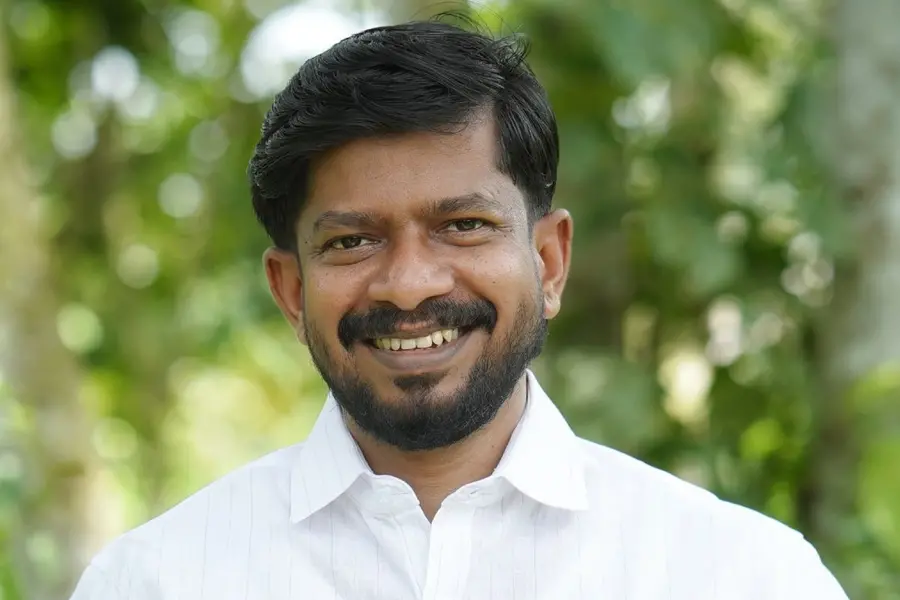
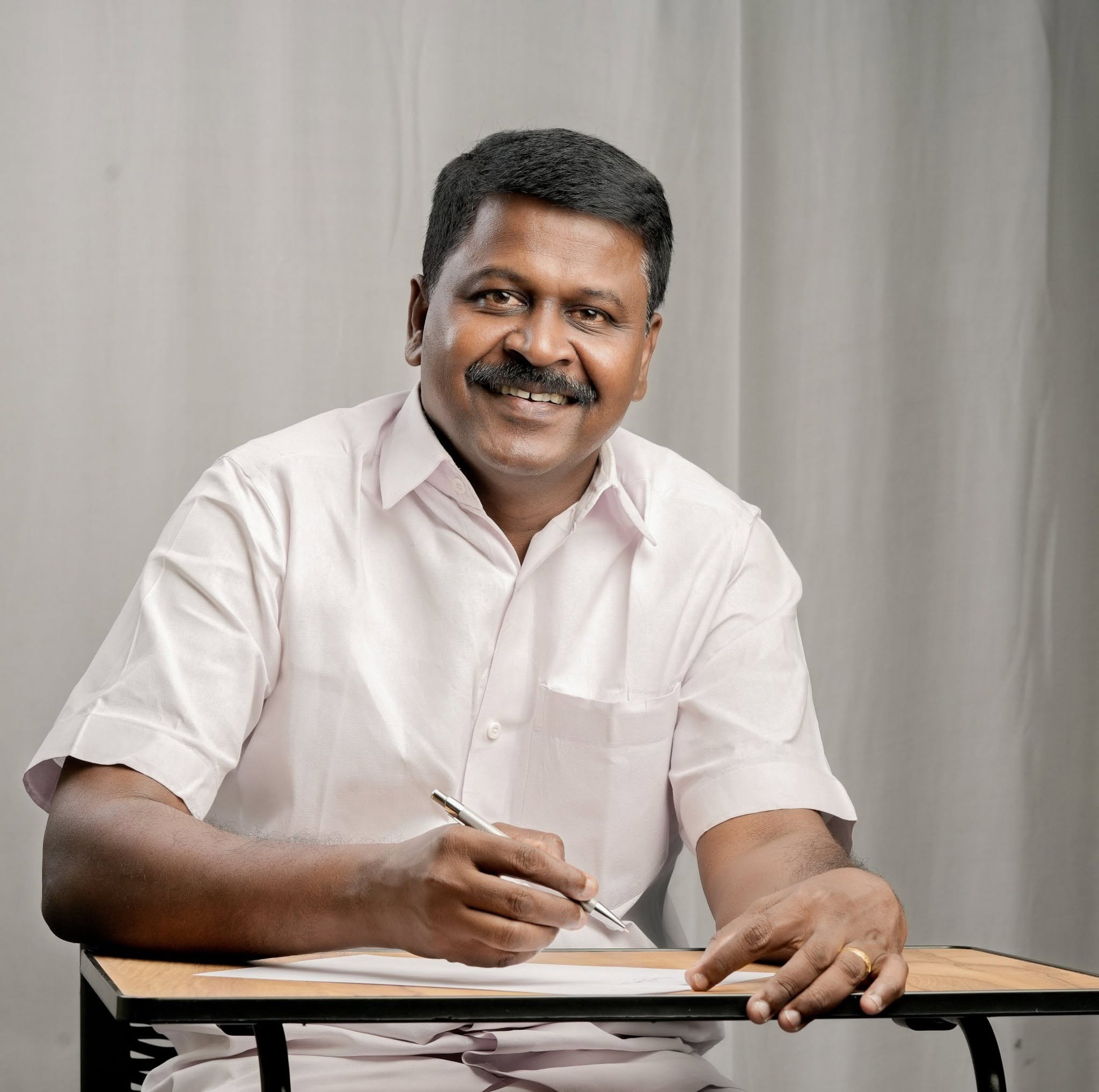
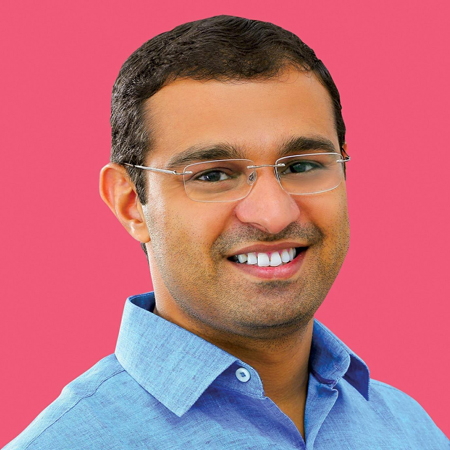
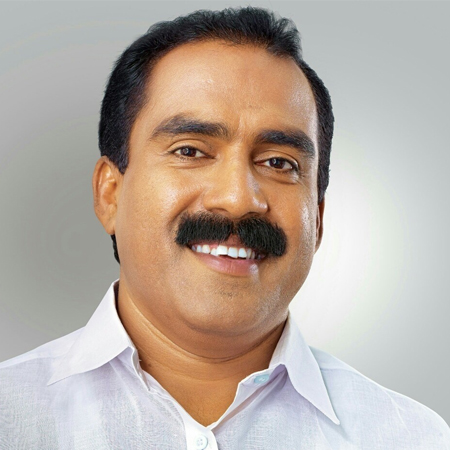
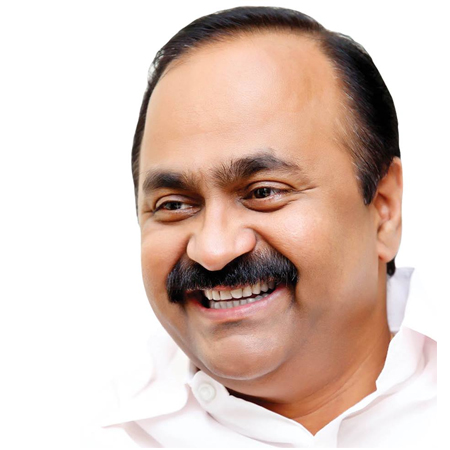
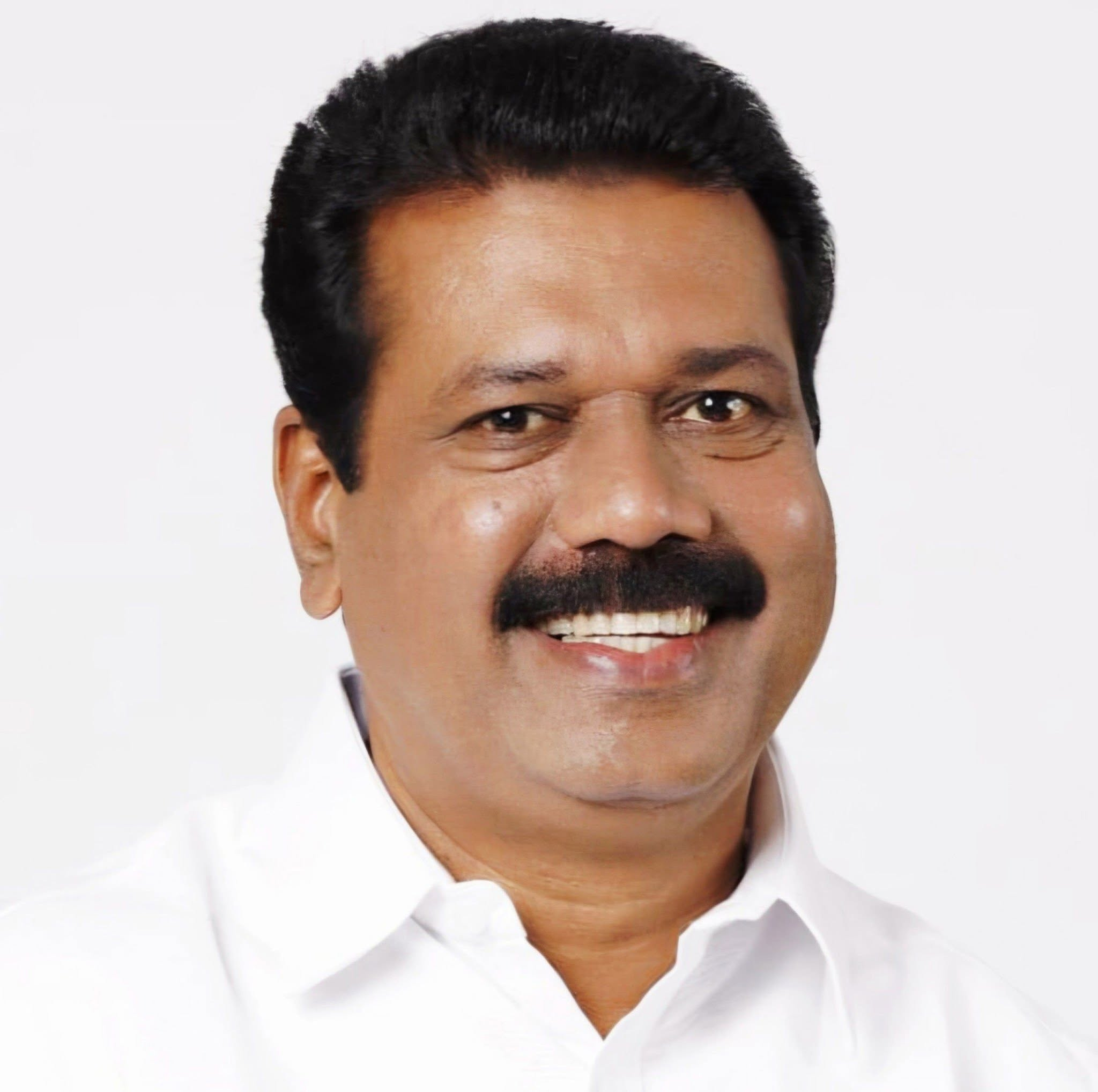
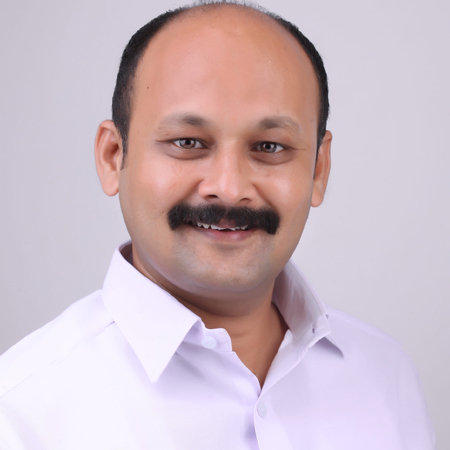
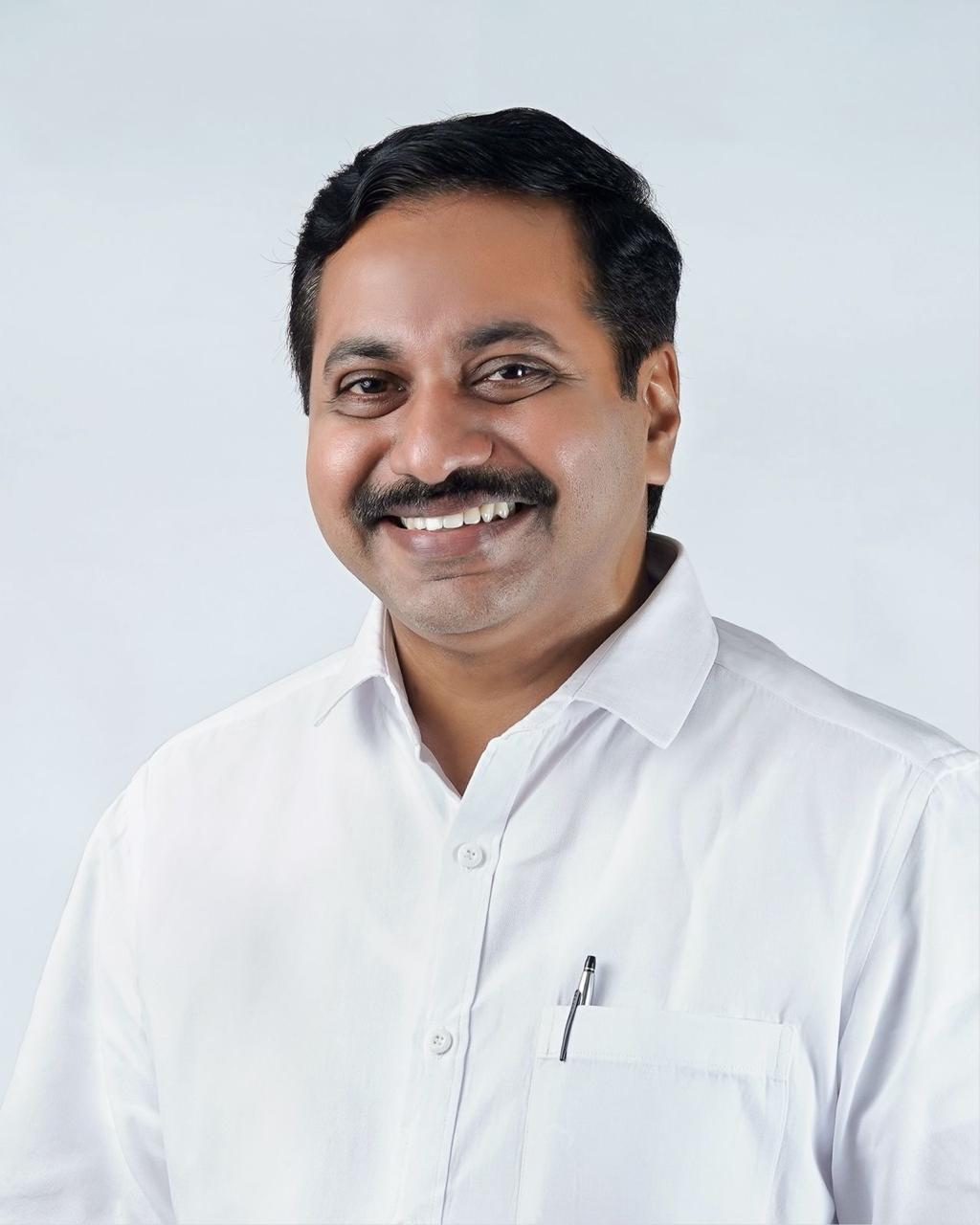
No.	Constituency	Name	Image	Party	Role
Kasargod District
1.	Uduma	K. Neelakandan		INC	Member, Subject Committee II (Revenue & Devaswom), Kerala Legislative Assembly; Member, Committee on Government Assurance, Kerala Legislative Assembly; Member, Rules Committee, Kerala Legislative Assembly
2.	Thrikaripur	Sandeep Varier		INC	Member, Subject Committee V (Public Works, Transport & Communications), Kerala Legislative Assembly; Member, Committee on the Welfare of Youth &Youth Affairs, Kerala Legislative Assembly
Kannur district
1	Irikkur	Sajeev Joseph		INC	Member, Local Fund Audit Committee, 16th Kerala Legislative Assembly; Member, Subject Committee II (Revenue & Devaswom), Kerala Legislative Assembly; Chairperson, Committee on Enviornment, Kerala Legislative Assembly
2	Kannur	T.O Mohanan		INC	Member, Estimates Committee, 16th Kerala Legislative Assembly; Member, Subject Committee IX (Local Self Government, Rural Development & Housing), Kerala Legislative Assembly; Member, Committee on Subordinate Legislation, Kerala Legislative Assembly
3.	Peravoor	Sunny Joseph		INC	President, Pradesh Congress Committee, Keralam; Minister of Electricity, Environment & Parliamentary Affairs; Member, Political Affairs Committee, Kerala Pradesh Congress Committee; Chairperson,Subject Committee VII (Electricity, Labour & Labour Welfare), Kerala Legislative Assembly; Ex-Officio Member, Subject Committee X (Forest, Enviornment & Tourism), Kerala Legislative Assembly
Wayanad district
1	Mananthavady (ST)	Usha Vijayan		INC	Member, Subject Committee I (Agriculture, Animal Husbandary & Fisheries), Kerala Legislative Assembly; Member, Committee on Privileges & Ethics, Kerala Legislative Assembly; Member, Committee on Women, Children & Transgenders, Kerala Legislative Assembly
2	Sulthan Bathery	I. C. Balakrishnan		INC	Member, Public Undertakings Committee, 16th Kerala Legislative Assembly; Member, Subject Committee V (Public Works, Transport & Communications), Kerala Legislative Assembly; Chairperson,Committee on Scheduled Castes-Scheduled Tribe Welfare, Kerala Legislative Assembly; Member, General Council, Kerala Agricultural University
3	Kalpetta	T Siddique		INC	Minister of Agriculture; Member, Political Affairs Committee, Kerala Pradesh Congress Committee; Chairperson, Subject Committee I (Agriculture, Animal Husbandary & Fisheries), Kerala Legislative Assembly
Kozhikode District
1	Nadapuram	K. M. Abhijith		INC	Member, Subject Committee XI (Food, Civil Supplies & Cooperation), Kerala Legislative Assembly; Member, Committee on Backward Classes, Kerala Legislative Assembly; Member, Committee on the Welfare of Non-Resident Keralites, Kerala Legislative Assembly
2	Koyilandy	K. Praveen Kumar		INC	President, Kozhikode District Congress Committee; Member, Subject Committee VIII (Finance), Kerala Legislative Assembly; Member, Committee on Papers Laid in the Table, Kerala Legislative Assembly; Member, Committee on the Welfare of Old Aged People, Kerala Legislative Assembly
3	Balussery (SC)	V. T. Sooraj		INC	Member, Subject Committee XIII (Social Service), Kerala Legislative Assembly; Member, Committee on Government Assurance, Kerala Legislative Assembly; Member, Committee on Scheduled Castes-Scheduled Tribe Welfare, Kerala Legislative Assembly
4	Elathur	Vidya Balakrishnan		INC	Member, Subject Committee XII (Health & Family Welfare), Kerala Legislative Assembly; Member, Committee on Papers Laid in the Table, Kerala Legislative Assembly; Member, Committee on Women, Children & Transgenders, Kerala Legislative Assembly
5	Kozhikode North	K.Jayanth		INC	Member, Subject Committee XIV (Home Affairs), Kerala Legislative Assembly; Member, Committee on Subordinate Legislation, Kerala Legislative Assembly; Member, House Committee, Kerala Legislative Assembly
Malappuram district
1	Nilambur	Aryadan Shoukath		INC	Member, Estimates Committee, 16th Kerala Legislative Assembly; Member, Subject Committee X (Forest, Enviornment & Tourism), Kerala Legislative Assembly; Member, Committee on Official Language, Kerala Legislative Assembly
2	Wandoor	A. P. Anil Kumar		INC	Minister of Revenue Department; Working President, Pradesh Congress Committee, Keralam; Member, Political Affairs Committee, Kerala Pradesh Congress Committee; Chairperson, Subject Committee II (Revenue & Devaswom), Kerala Legislative Assembly
3	Thavanur	V. S Joy		INC	President, Malappuram District Congress Committee; Member, Local Fund Audit Committee, 16th Kerala Legislative Assembly; Member, Subject Committee III (Water Resources), Kerala Legislative Assembly; Member, Committee on the Welfare of Fish workers & Allied abourers, Kerala Legislative Assembly; Member, Committee on the Welfare of Youth &Youth Affairs, Kerala Legislative Assembly
4	Ponnani	K. P Noushad Ali		INC	Member, Local Fund Audit Committee, 16th Kerala Legislative Assembly; Member, Subject Committee XIV (Home Affairs), Kerala Legislative Assembly; Member, Committee on Enviornment, Kerala Legislative Assembly
Palakkad District
1	Thrithala	V. T. Balram		INC	Chairperson, Estimates Committee, 16th Kerala Legislative Assembly; Member, Subject Committee III (Water Resources), Kerala Legislative Assembly
2	Kongad (SC)	K. A. Thulasi		INC	Minister of Scheduled Castes, Scheduled Tribes and Backward Classes; Ex-Officio Member, Subject Committee XIII (Social Service), Kerala Legislative Assembly
3	Palakkad	Ramesh Pisharody		INC	Member, Subject Committee X (Forest, Enviornment & Tourism), Kerala Legislative Assembly; Member, Committee on Official Language, Kerala Legislative Assembly
4	Chittur	Sumesh Achuthan		INC	Member,Subject Committee VII (Electricity, Labour & Labour Welfare), Kerala Legislative Assembly; Member, Committee on Backward Classes, Kerala Legislative Assembly
Thrissur district
1	Thrissur	Rajan Pallan		INC	Member, Local Fund Audit Committee, 16th Kerala Legislative Assembly; Member, Subject Committee IV (Industries & Minerals), Kerala Legislative Assembly; Member, Committee on the Welfare of Old Aged People, Kerala Legislative Assembly
2	Chalakudy	T. J. Saneesh Kumar Joseph		INC	Member, Estimates Committee, 16th Kerala Legislative Assembly; Member, Subject Committee XI (Food, Civil Supplies & Cooperation), Kerala Legislative Assembly; Chairperson, Committee on the Welfare of Youth &Youth Affairs, Kerala Legislative Assembly; Member, General Council, Kerala Agricultural University
3	Kodungallur	O. J. Janeesh		INC	Minister of Youth Affairs, Sports, Registration & Museum; President, Indian Youth Congress, Keralam; Ex-Officio Member, Subject Committee VI (Education), Kerala Legislative Assembly
Ernakulam district
1	Perumbavoor	Manoj Moothedan		INC	Member, Subject Committee XIII (Social Service), Kerala Legislative Assembly; Member, Committee on Government Assurance, Kerala Legislative Assembly
2	Angamaly	Roji M. John		INC	Minister of Higher Education; Secretary, All India Congress Committee (Karnataka); Member, Political Affairs Committee, Kerala Pradesh Congress Committee; Ex-Officio Member, Subject Committee VI (Education), Kerala Legislative Assembly
3	Aluva	Anwar Sadath		INC	Chairperson, Local Fund Audit Committee, 16th Kerala Legislative Assembly; Member,Subject Committee VII (Electricity, Labour & Labour Welfare), Kerala Legislative Assembly; Member, Library Advisory Committee, Kerala Legislative Assembly
4	Paravur	V. D. Satheesan		INC	Chief Minister of Kerala; Chairman, UDF Keralam; Leader of the Congress Legislative Party; Member, Political Affairs Committee, Kerala Pradesh Congress Committee; Chairperson,Subject Committee VIII (Finance), Kerala Legislative Assembly; Special Invitee, Subject Committee V (Public Works, Transport & Communications), Kerala Legislative Assembly
5	Vypin	Tony Chammany		INC	Member, Subject Committee IX (Local Self Government, Rural Development & Housing), Kerala Legislative Assembly; Member, Committee on Government Assurance, Kerala Legislative Assembly; Member, Committee on the Welfare of Non-Resident Keralites, Kerala Legislative Assembly
6	Kochi	Mohammad Shiyas		INC	President, Ernakulam District Congress Committee; Member, Public Accounts Committee, 16th Kerala Legislative Assembly; Member, Subject Committee V (Public Works, Transport & Communications), Kerala Legislative Assembly; Member, Committee on Petitions, Kerala Legislative Assembly; Member, Committee on Privileges & Ethics, Kerala Legislative Assembly; Member, Syndicate, Cochin University of Science & Technology
7	Thrippunithura	Deepak Joy		INC	Member, Subject Committee IX (Local Self Government, Rural Development & Housing), Kerala Legislative Assembly; Member, Committee on Private Members' Bill & Resolution, Kerala Legislative Assembly; Member, House Committee, Kerala Legislative Assembly
8	Ernakulam	T. J. Vinod		INC	Member, Local Fund Audit Committee, 16th Kerala Legislative Assembly; Member, Subject Committee IX (Local Self Government, Rural Development & Housing), Kerala Legislative Assembly; Chairperson, Committee on Official Language, Kerala Legislative Assembly
9	Thrikkakara	Uma Thomas		INC	Member, Public Undertakings Committee, 16th Kerala Legislative Assembly; Member, Subject Committee XIII (Social Service), Kerala Legislative Assembly; Chairperson, Committee on Women, Children & Transgenders, Kerala Legislative Assembly; Member, Board of Governors, A.P.J. Abdul Kalam Technological University
10	Kunnathunad (SC)	V. P. Sajeendran		INC	Member, Public Accounts Committee, 16th Kerala Legislative Assembly; Member, Subject Committee XII (Health & Family Welfare), Kerala Legislative Assembly; Member, Committee on Scheduled Castes-Scheduled Tribe Welfare, Kerala Legislative Assembly
11	Muvattupuzha	Mathew Kuzhalnadan		INC	Member, Public Accounts Committee, 16th Kerala Legislative Assembly; Member, Subject Committee VI (Education), Kerala Legislative Assembly; Chairperson, Committee on Private Members' Bill & Resolution, Kerala Legislative Assembly; Member, Syndicate, Mahatma Gandhi University
Idukki District
1	Devikulam (SC)	F Raja		INC	Member,Subject Committee VII (Electricity, Labour & Labour Welfare), Kerala Legislative Assembly; Member, Committee on Papers Laid in the Table, Kerala Legislative Assembly; Member, Committee on Scheduled Castes-Scheduled Tribe Welfare, Kerala Legislative Assembly
2	Udumbanchola	Senapathy Venu		INC	Member, Subject Committee II (Revenue & Devaswoms), Kerala Legislative Assembly; Member, Committee on Subordinate Legislation, Kerala Legislative Assembly; Member, Committee on Backward Classes, Kerala Legislative Assembly
3	Idukki	Roy K Paulose		INC|	Member, Subject Committee III (Water Resources), Kerala Legislative Assembly; Member, Committee on Petitions, Kerala Legislative Assembly; Member, Rules Committee, Kerala Legislative Assembly
4	Peerumade	Cyriac Thomas		INC	Member, Subject Committee I (Agriculture, Animal Husbandary & Fisheries), Kerala Legislative Assembly; Member, Committee on Privileges & Ethics, Kerala Legislative Assembly; Member, Rules Committee, Kerala Legislative Assembly
Kottayam district
1	Vaikom (SC)	K. Binimon		INC	Member, Subject Committee III (Water Resources), Kerala Legislative Assembly; Member, Committee on Private Members' Bill & Resolution, Kerala Legislative Assembly; Member, Committee on Scheduled Castes-Scheduled Tribe Welfare, Kerala Legislative Assembly
2	Ettumanoor	Nattakom Suresh		INC	President, Kottayam District Congress Committee; Member, Subject Committee XI (Food, Civil Supplies & Cooperation), Kerala Legislative Assembly; Member, Committee on Backward Classes, Kerala Legislative Assembly
3	Kottayam	Thiruvanchoor Radhakrishnan		INC	Speaker of Kerala Legislative Assembly; Ex-Officio Chairperson, Rules Committee, Kerala Legislative Assembly; Member, Political Affairs Committee, Kerala Pradesh Congress Committee
4	Puthuppally	Chandy Oommen		INC	Member, Public Undertakings Committee, 16th Kerala Legislative Assembly; Member, Subject Committee IV (Industries & Minerals), Kerala Legislative Assembly; Member, Committee on Enviornment, Kerala Legislative Assembly; Member, General Council, National University of Advanced Legal Studies
5	Kanjirappally	Rony K Baby		INC	Member, Subject Committee VI (Education), Kerala Legislative Assembly; Member, Library Advisory Committee, Kerala Legislative Assembly
6	Poonjar	Sebastian M. J.		INC	Member, Subject Committee IV (Industries & Minerals), Kerala Legislative Assembly; Member, Committee on Enviornment, Kerala Legislative Assembly; Member, Committee on Official Language, Kerala Legislative Assembly; Member, Rules Committee, Kerala Legislative Assembly
Alappuzha district
1	Aroor	Shanimol Osman		INCINC'	Deputy Speaker of Kerala Legislative Assembly; Member, Political Affairs Committee, Kerala Pradesh Congress Committee
2	Alappuzha	A.D.Thomas		INC	Member, Subject Committee III (Water Resources), Kerala Legislative Assembly; Member, Committee on the Welfare of Fish workers & allied labourers, Kerala Legislative Assembly
3	Haripad	Ramesh Chennithala		INC	Minister of Home Affairs, Vigilance, Fire & Rescue, Prisons & Coir; Permanent Invitee, Congress Working Committee; Member, Political Affairs Committee, Kerala Pradesh Congress Committee; Chairperson, Subject Committee XIV (Home Affairs), Kerala Legislative Assembly; Ex-Officio Member, Subject Committee IV (Industries & Minerals), Kerala Legislative Assembly
4	Kayamkulam	M. Liju		INC	Minister of Excise & Coir; Member, Political Affairs Committee, Kerala Pradesh Congress Committee; Ex-Officio Member, Subject Committee VIII (Finance), Kerala Legislative Assembly; Ex-Officio Member, Subject Committee XI (Food, Civil Supplies & Cooperation), Kerala Legislative Assembly
Pathanamthitta District
1	Ranni	Pazhakulam Madhu		INC	Member, Subject Committee X (Forest, Enviornment & Tourism), Kerala Legislative Assembly; Member, Committee on the Welfare of Non-Resident Keralites, Kerala Legislative Assembly; Member, Library Advisory Committee, Kerala Legislative Assembly
2	Aranmula	Abin Varkey		INC	Member,Subject Committee VII (Electricity, Labour & Labour Welfare), Kerala Legislative Assembly; Member, Committee on Privileges & Ethics, Kerala Legislative Assembly; Member, Committee on Women, Children & Transgenders, Kerala Legislative Assembly
3	Adoor (SC)	Adv. C. V. Santhakumar		INC	Member, Subject Committee XIII (Social Service), Kerala Legislative Assembly; Member, Committee on Subordinate Legislation, Kerala Legislative Assembly
Kollam district
1	Karunagappally	C. R. Mahesh		INC	Member, Public Undertakings Committee, 16th Kerala Legislative Assembly; Member, Subject Committee I (Agriculture, Animal Husbandary & Fisheries), Kerala Legislative Assembly; Chairperson, Committee on the Welfare of Fish workers & allied labourers, Kerala Legislative Assembly
2	Pathanapuram	Jyothi Kumar Chamakkala		INC	Member, Public Undertakings Committee, 16th Kerala Legislative Assembly; Member, Subject Committee VI (Education), Kerala Legislative Assembly; Member, Committee on Private Members' Bill & Resolution, Kerala Legislative Assembly; Member, Board of Governors, A.P.J. Abdul Kalam Technological University
3	Chadayamangalam	M. M. Naseer		INC	Member,Subject Committee VII (Electricity, Labour & Labour Welfare), Kerala Legislative Assembly; Member, Committee on Government Assurance, Kerala Legislative Assembly; Member, Committee on the Welfare of Old Aged People, Kerala Legislative Assembly
4	Kundara	P. C. Vishnunadh		INC	Minister of Tourism Culture &Cinema; Working President, Pradesh Congress Committee, Keralam; Member, Political Affairs Committee, Kerala Pradesh Congress Committee; Ex-Officio Member, Subject Committee VI (Education), Kerala Legislative Assembly; Ex-Officio Member, Subject Committee X (Forest, Enviornment & Tourism), Kerala Legislative Assembly
5	Kollam	Bindu Krishna		INC	Minister of Labour, Dairy Development, Women & Child Development & Animal Husbandary; Member, Political Affairs Committee, Kerala Pradesh Congress Committee; Ex-Officio Member, Subject Committee I (Agriculture, Animal Husbandary & Fisheries), Kerala Legislative Assembly; Ex-Officio Member,Subject Committee VII (Electricity, Labour & Labour Welfare), Kerala Legislative Assembly; Ex-Officio Member, Subject Committee XII (Health & Family Welfare), Kerala Legislative Assembly
Thiruvananthapuram district
1	Chirayinkeezhu (SC)	Ramya Haridas		INC	Member, Estimates Committee, 16th Kerala Legislative Assembly; Member, Subject Committee XII (Health & Family Welfare), Kerala Legislative Assembly; Member, Committee on the Welfare of Fish workers & allied labourers, Kerala Legislative Assembly; Member, Board of Governors, A.P.J. Abdul Kalam Technological University
2	Vamanapuram	Sudheersha Palode		INC	Member, Subject Committee XIII (Social Service), Kerala Legislative Assembly; Member, Committee on the Welfare of Youth &Youth Affairs, Kerala Legislative Assembly
3	Vattiyoorkavu	K. Muraleedharan		INC	Minister of Health & Devaswoms; Member, Political Affairs Committee, Kerala Pradesh Congress Committee; Chairperson, Subject Committee XII (Health & Family Welfare), Kerala Legislative Assembly; Ex-Officio Member, Subject Committee II (Revenue & Devaswom), Kerala Legislative Assembly
4	Kattakkada	M. R. Baiju		INC	Member, Subject Committee IX (Local Self Government, Rural Development & Housing), Kerala Legislative Assembly; Member, Committee on Petitions, Kerala Legislative Assembly; Member, Library Advisory Committee, Kerala Legislative Assembly
5	Kovalam	M. Vincent		INC	Member, Public Accounts Committee, 16th Kerala Legislative Assembly; Member, Subject Committee VIII (Finance), Kerala Legislative Assembly; Member, Committee on the Welfare of Non-Resident Keralites, Kerala Legislative Assembly; Member, Rules Committee, Kerala Legislative Assembly
6	Neyyattinkara	N. Sakthan		INC	President, Thiruvananthapuram District Congress Committee (I/C); Member, Public Accounts Committee, 16th Kerala Legislative Assembly; Member, Subject Committee XIV (Home Affairs), Kerala Legislative Assembly; Chairperson, Committee on Privileges & Ethics, Kerala Legislative Assembly; Member, Rules Committee, Kerala Legislative Assembly

=== 18th Lok Sabha- 2024 ===
Parliamentary Constituency	Member (M. P.)	Image	Role
Kasaragod	Rajmohan Unnithan
Kannur	K. Sudhakaran
Vatakara	Shafi Parambil
Wayanad	Priyanka Gandhi (elected in 2024 by-election)
Kozhikode	M. K. Raghavan
Palakkad	V. K. Sreekandan
Chalakudy	Benny Behanan
Ernakulam	Hibi Eden
Idukki	Dean Kuriakose
Mavelikkara	Kodikunnil Suresh
Pathanamthitta	Anto Antony Punnathaniyil
Alappuzha	K. C. Venugopal
Attingal	Adoor Prakash
Thiruvananthapuram	Dr Shashi Tharoor

=== Rajya Sabha ===
No.	State	Member (M. P.)	Image	Role
1	Kerala	Jebi Mather

=== Local Body Elections- 2025 ===
==== I. MUNCIPAL CORPORATION ====
Sl. No.	Muncipal Corporation	Total Seats	UDF	INC	Government/ Opposition	Mayor	Deputy Mayor
1.	Kannur	56	36	21	Government	Adv. P. Indira	
2.	Kozhikode	76	28	14	Opposition		
3.	Thrissur	56	35	33	Government	Dr. Niji Justin	A Prasad
4.	Kochi	76	48	42	Government	Adv. Minimol V.K.	V.R. Sudheer
5.	Kollam	56	27	22	Government	A.K. Hafeez	Karumalil Dr Udaya Sukumaran
6.	Thiruvananathapuram	101	20	17	Other Opposition		
TOTAL		421	187	148			

==== II. DISTRICT PANCHAYAT ====
Sl.No.	Name of the District Panchayat	Total Seats	UDF	INC	Government/ Opposition	President	Vice President
1.	Kasargod	18	8	4	Opposition		
2.	Kannur	25	7	4	Opposition		
3.	Wayanad	17	15	9	Government	Chandrika Krishnan	
4.	Kozhikode	28	14	8	Government	Mili Mohan	
5.	Malappuram	33	33	9	Government		
6.	Palakkad	33	12	8	Opposition		
7.	Thrissur	30	9	7	Opposition		
8.	Ernakulam	28	25	22	Government	K.G. Radhakrishnan	Sinta Jacob
9.	Idukki	17	14	10	Government		T.S. Siddique
10.	Kottayam	23	16	12	Government	Joshy Philip	
11.	Alappuzha	24	8	8	Opposition		
12.	Pathanamthitta	17	12	10	Government	Deenama Roy	Anish Varikanamala
13.	Kollam	27	10	9	Opposition		
14.	Thiruvananthapuram	28	13	12	Opposition		
TOTAL		346	196	130			

=== III. Other Local Bodies ===
Sl. Number	Category	Total Local Bodies	UDF	INC Ruled	Total Wards	UDF	INC
1.	Muncipality	87	54	29	3240	1458	899
2.	Block Panchayat	152	79		2267	1241	917
3.	Grama Panchayat	941	501		17337	8021	5723

== See also ==
- Indian National Congress
- National Students' Union of India
- Kerala Students Union
- Indian Youth Congress
- Communist Party of India (Marxist) – Kerala
- United Democratic Front (Kerala)
- Indian National Developmental Inclusive Alliance
