= Vadakkancheri =

Vadakkancheri may refer to

- Vadakkancheri-I, a village in Palakkad district, Kerala, India
- Vadakkancheri-II, a village in Palakkad district, Kerala, India
- Vadakkancheri (gram panchayat), a gram panchayat serving the above villages

== See also ==
- Vadakkencherry, a town in Palakkad district, Kerala
- Wadakkancherry, a town in Thrissur district, Kerala
