= Kuzhalmannam =

Kuzhalmannam (Coyalmannam, Kozhalmannam) may refer to

- Kuzhalmannam-I, a village in Palakkad district, Kerala, India
- Kuzhalmannam-II, a village in Palakkad district, Kerala, India
- Kuzhalmannam (gram panchayat), a gram panchayat serving the above villages
