= Tarur =

Tarur may refer to

- Tarur-I, a village in Palakkad district, Kerala, India
- Tarur-II, a village in Palakkad district, Kerala, India
- Tarur (gram panchayat), a gram panchayat serving the above two villages
