= Anjumoorthy =

Anjumoorthy Anjumoorthy Mangalam
- Neighbourhood
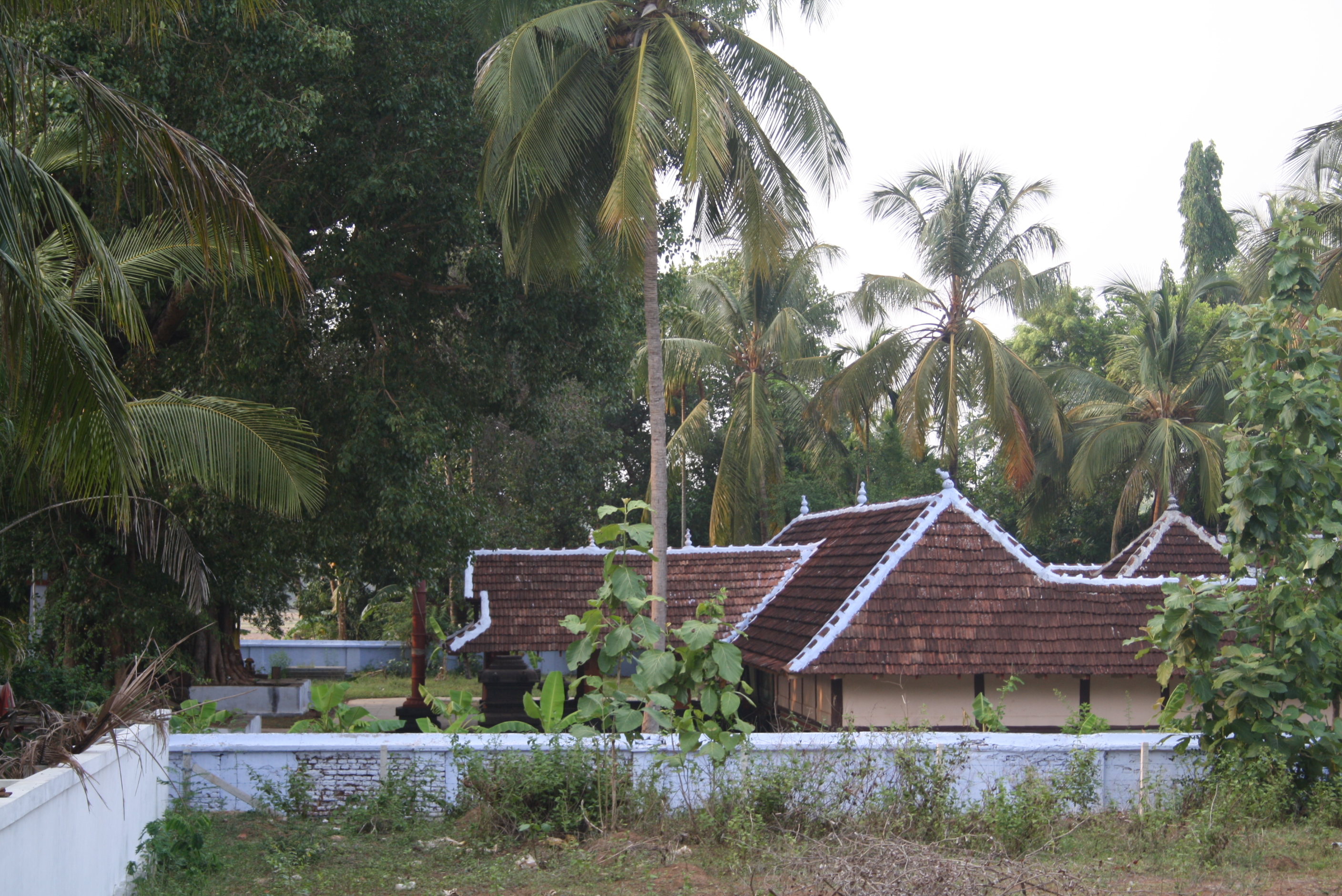
- Anjumoorthy temple

- Anjumoorthy, Palakkad, Kerala
- Coordinates: 10.6106°N 76.5031°E
- Country: India
- State: Kerala
- District: Palakkad
- Elevation: 84.76 m (278.1 ft)

Languages
  - Official: Malayalam, English
  - Speech: Malayalam, English
- Time zone: UTC+5:30 (IST)
- PIN: 678682
- Telephone code: +914922******
- Other Neighbourhoods: Vadakkencherry, Ayakkad, Mudappallur, Chittalancheri, Vadakkancheri-II, Mannapra, Kavasseri-II
- LS: Alathur
- VS: Tarur

Anjumoorthy or Anjumoorthy Mangalam is a neighbourhood in Palakkad district, Kerala state in India. (It is also called as Anjumoorthy Mangalam).

== Location ==
Anjumoorthy village is located with the coordinates of 10.6106°N 76.5031°E in Palakkad district with the pincode of 678682.

Anjumoorthy (Kerala)

== Religion ==
=== Hindu temple ===
There is a Hindu temple viz., Anjumoorthy Temple here which is one of the 108 Shiva Temples.
