= Irikkur Assembly constituency =

Constituency of the Kerala legislative assembly in India

Irikkur
- Constituency No. 9 for the Kerala Legislative Assembly
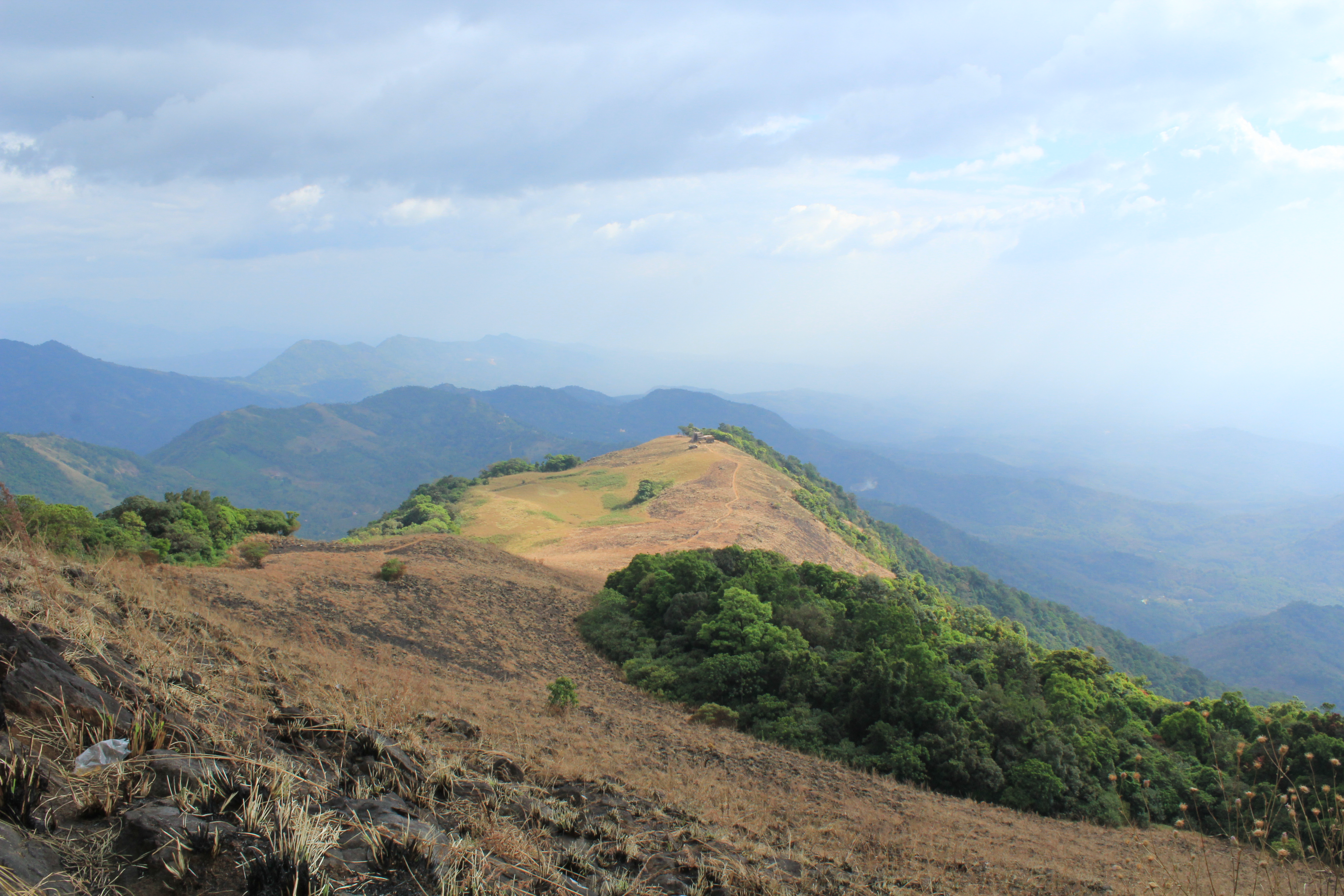
- Paithalmala in Irikkur constituency

Constituency details
- Country: India
- Region: South India
- State: Kerala
- District: Kannur
- Established: 1957
- Total electors: 199,326 (2026)
- Reservation: None

Member of Legislative Assembly
- 16th Kerala Legislative Assembly
- Incumbent Sajeev Joseph
- Party: INC
- Alliance: UDF
- Elected year: 2026

Irikkur State assembly constituency is one of the 140 state legislative assembly constituencies in Kerala in southern India. It is also one of the seven state legislative assembly constituencies included in Kannur Lok Sabha constituency. As of the 2026 elections, the current MLA is Sajeev Joseph of INC.

This Constituency Is Dominated By Migrant Syrian Christians, Predominantly Syro-Malabar Catholics Belonging To The Archeparchy of Tellicherry.

== Local self-governed segments ==
Irikkur Assembly constituency is composed of the following local self-governed segments:

Sl no.	Name	Status (Grama panchayat/Municipality)	Taluk
1	Sreekandapuram	Municipality	Taliparamba
2	Alakode	Grama panchayat	Taliparamba
3	Chengalayi	Grama panchayat	Taliparamba
4	Eruvessi	Grama panchayat	Taliparamba
5	Irikkur	Grama panchayat	Taliparamba
6	Naduvil	Grama panchayat	Taliparamba
7	Payyavoor	Grama panchayat	Taliparamba
8	Udayagiri	Grama panchayat	Taliparamba
9	Ulikkal	Grama panchayat	Iritty

== Members of Legislative Assembly ==
The following list contains all members of Kerala Legislative Assembly who have represented the constituency:

Election	Niyama Sabha	Member	Party	Tenure
1957	1st	T. C. Narayanan Nambiar	Communist Party of India	1957 – 1960
1960	2nd	T. C. Narayanan Nambiar	Communist Party of India	1960 – 1965
1967	3rd	E. P. Krishnan Nambiar	Communist Party of India	1967 – 1970
1970	4th	A. Kunhikannan	Communist Party of India	1970 – 1974
1970	4th	E. K. Nayanar	Communist Party of India	1974 – 1977
1977	5th	C. P. Govindan Nambiar	Indian National Congress	1977 – 1980
1980	6th	Kadannappalli Ramachandran	Indian National Congress	1980 – 1982
1982	7th	K. C. Joseph	Indian National Congress	1982 – 1987
1987	8th	K. C. Joseph	Indian National Congress	1987 – 1991
1991	9th	K. C. Joseph	Indian National Congress	1991 – 1996
1996	10th	K. C. Joseph	Indian National Congress	1996 – 2001
2001	11th	K. C. Joseph	Indian National Congress	2001 – 2006
2006	12th	K. C. Joseph	Indian National Congress	2006 – 2011
2011	13th	K. C. Joseph	Indian National Congress	2011 – 2016
2016	14th	K. C. Joseph	Indian National Congress	2016 – 2021
2021	15th	Sajeev Joseph	Indian National Congress	2021-2026
2026	16th	Sajeev Joseph	Indian National Congress	2026-

== Election results ==
=== 2026 ===
There were 199,326 registered voters in the Irikkur Assembly constituency for the 2026 Kerala Assembly election.

2026 Kerala Legislative Assembly election: Irikkur
Party	Candidate	Votes	%	±%
INC	Sajeev Joseph	90,895	59.94	▲9.61
KC(M)	Mathew Kunnapilly	48,469	31.96	▼11.81
TTP	Sreenath Padmanabhan	9,617	6.34	▲1.21
AAP	Joseph P. V.	1,151	0.76	
SDPI	M. J. Mathew	417	0.27	
Independent	Amal K. T.	299	0.20	
NOTA	None of the above	765	0.53	▲0.23
Margin of victory		42,426	27.98	▲21.42
Turnout		1,51,791	75.70	▲0.07
INC hold		Swing	▲9.61	

Local Body	Booths	UDF Votes	LDF Votes	Twenty20 Votes	Leader	Lead
Alakode	31	13,084	7,033	1,533	UDF	6,051
Udayagiri	17	5,679	2,916	1,006	UDF	2,763
Naduvil	29	11,873	5,590	1,472	UDF	6,283
Chengalayi	23	9,636	6,957	843	UDF	2,679
Sreekandapuram	33	12,964	8,543	1,455	UDF	4,421
Eruvessy	17	6,512	3,263	842	UDF	3,249
Payyavoor	22	8,357	4,112	866	UDF	4,245
Irikkur	10	7,094	1,544	220	UDF	5,550
Ulikkal	32	13,671	7,297	1,208	UDF	6,374
TOTAL	214	88,870	47,255	9,445	UDF	41,615

=== 2021 ===
There were 1,94,966 registered voters in the constituency for the 2021 election with a polling rate of 75.63%.

2021 Kerala Legislative Assembly election: Irikkur
Party	Candidate	Votes	%	±%
INC	Sajeev Joseph	76,764	50.33	▲1.77
KC(M)	Saji Kuttiyanimattom	66,754	43.77	▼1.29
BJP	Aniyamma Rajendran	7,825	5.13	▼0.47
NOTA	None of the above	459	0.30	▼0.07
Independent	Chacko Karimbil	311	0.20	−
Independent	Sajan Kuttiyanikkal	275	0.18	−
Independent	Joy John	128	0.08	−
Majority		10,010	6.56	▲0.04
Turnout		152,516	75.63	▼2.96
Registered electors		194,966		
INC hold		Swing	▲1.77	

=== 2016 ===
There were 1,88,416 registered voters in the constituency for the 2016 election.

2016 Kerala Legislative Assembly election: Irikkur
Party	Candidate	Votes	%	±%
INC	K. C. Joseph	72,548	49.00	▼3.41
CPI	K. T. Jose	62,901	42.48	▼0.94
BJP	A. P. Gangadharan	8,294	5.60	▲2.90
Independent	Binoy Thomas	2,734	1.85	−
Independent	Joseph K. C. Kalayakkattil	602	0.41	−
NOTA	None of the above	553	0.37	−
Independent	Rijo	134	0.09	−
Independent	Rajeev Joseph	123	0.08	−
Independent	A. K. Shaji	103	0.07	−
Independent	Raveendran A. V.	80	0.05	−
Margin of victory		9,647	6.52	▼2.47
Turnout		1,48,072	78.59	▲1.37
INC hold		Swing	▼3.41	

=== 2011 ===
There were 1,69,262 registered voters in the constituency for the 2011 election.

2011 Kerala Legislative Assembly election: Irikkur
Party	Candidate	Votes	%	±%
INC	K. C. Joseph	68,503	52.41	
CPI	P. Santhosh Kumar	56,746	43.42	
BJP	M. G. Ramakrishnan Nair	3,529	2.70	
Independent	Joseph	740	0.57	
Independent	Ammini Krishnan	633	0.48	
BSP	Biju Thomas	552	0.42	
Margin of victory		11,757	8.99	
Turnout		1,30,703	77.22	
INC hold		Swing		

== See also ==
- Irikkur
- Kannur district
- List of constituencies of the Kerala Legislative Assembly
- 2016 Kerala Legislative Assembly election
