= A. K. Balan =

Indian politician and advocate

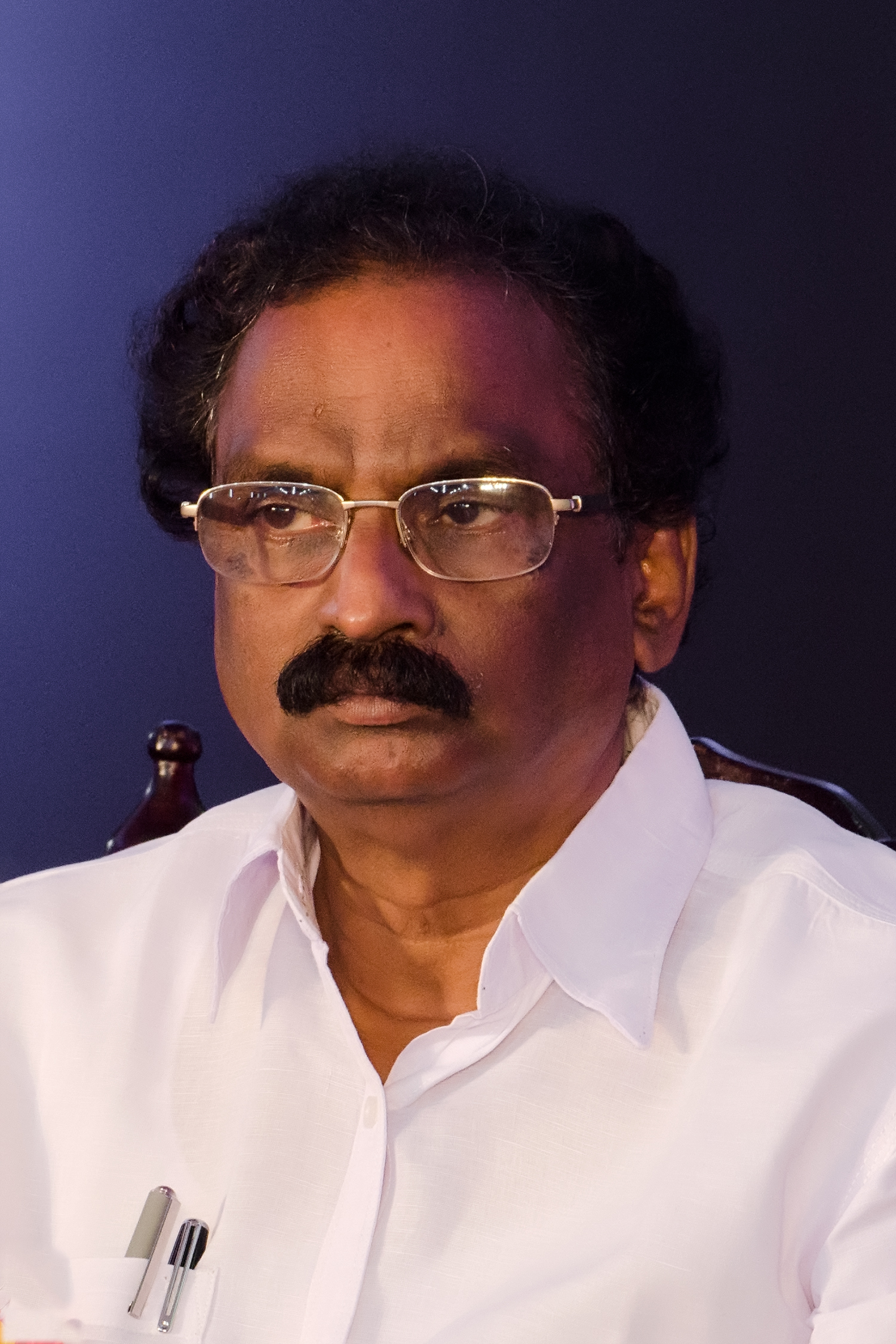

Minister for Law, Cultural Affairs, Parliamentary Affairs, SC/ST Development
- In office 25 May 2016 – 3 May 2021
- Preceded by: Ummen Chandy (Minister for Law); A. P. Anil Kumar (Minister for Welfare of SC and Backward classes); P. K. Jayalakshmi (Minister for Welfare of ST); K. C. Joseph (Minister for Cultural Affairs)
- Succeeded by: P. Rajeev (Minister for Law); K. Radhakrishnan (Minister for Parliamentary Affairs, SC/ST Development); Saji Cherian (Minister for Cultural Affairs)

Minister for Scheduled Castes and Scheduled Tribes Development and Electricity, Government of Kerala
- In office 2006 – 2011
- Preceded by: Aryadan Mohammed (Minister for Electricity ); A. P. Anil Kumar (Minister for SC/ST Development)
- Succeeded by: Aryadan Mohammed (Minister for Electricity ); A. P. Anil Kumar (Minister for SC Development and Welfare of Backward classes); P. K. Jayalakshmi (Minister for Welfare of ST)
- Constituency: Coyalmannam

Member of the Kerala Legislative Assembly
- In office 1 June 2011 – 2021
- Preceded by: Position established
- Succeeded by: P. P. Sumod
- Constituency: Tarur

Member of the Kerala Legislative Assembly
- In office 2001 – 2011
- Succeeded by: Position dissolved
- Constituency: Kuzhalmannam

Personal details
- Born: 3 August 1948 (age 78) Nadapuram, Malabar District, Madras Presidency, Dominion of India (present day Kozhikode, Kerala, India)
- Party: Communist Party of India (Marxist)
- Spouse: Dr. P. K. Jameela
- Children: 2
- Parents: Kelappan; Kunhi
- Education: Bachelors of Arts; Bachelor of Laws
- Alma mater: Government Brennen College, Thalassery; Government Law College, Kozhikode

A. Kelappan Balan (born 3 August 1948) is an Indian politician and advocate. He was the Minister for Electricity and SC/ST Development in the Left Democratic Front government under V. S. Achuthanandan from 2006 to 2011, Minister for SC/ST, Law, Cultural Affairs and Parliamentary Affairs in the first Pinarayi Vijayan ministry 2016-2021 . He is a member of Central Committee of Communist Party of India (Marxist). He represented the Tarur/Kozhalmannnam constituency in the Kerala Legislative Assembly from 2006 to 2021.

== Personal life ==
A. K. Balan was born to Kelappan and Kunhi on 3 August 1948 at Nadapuram in present-day Kozhikode district, Kerala. He is married to Dr. P. K. Jameela (Rtd. DHS) and has two sons, Nikhil Balan and Naveen Balan. Jameela was appointed Management Consultant at Aardram Mission in 2017. Naveen is married to Namitha Venugopal and was an international business developer in Paris, France. Nikhil is a graduate of Government Law College, Thiruvananthapuram and has also completed Post Graduation in Air and Space Law from Leiden University, Netherlands, becoming the first Malayali to complete the course.

== Education ==
Balan received his B.A. degree from Government Brennen College, Thalassery, and also holds an LL.B degree from Government Law College, Kozhikode.

== Career ==
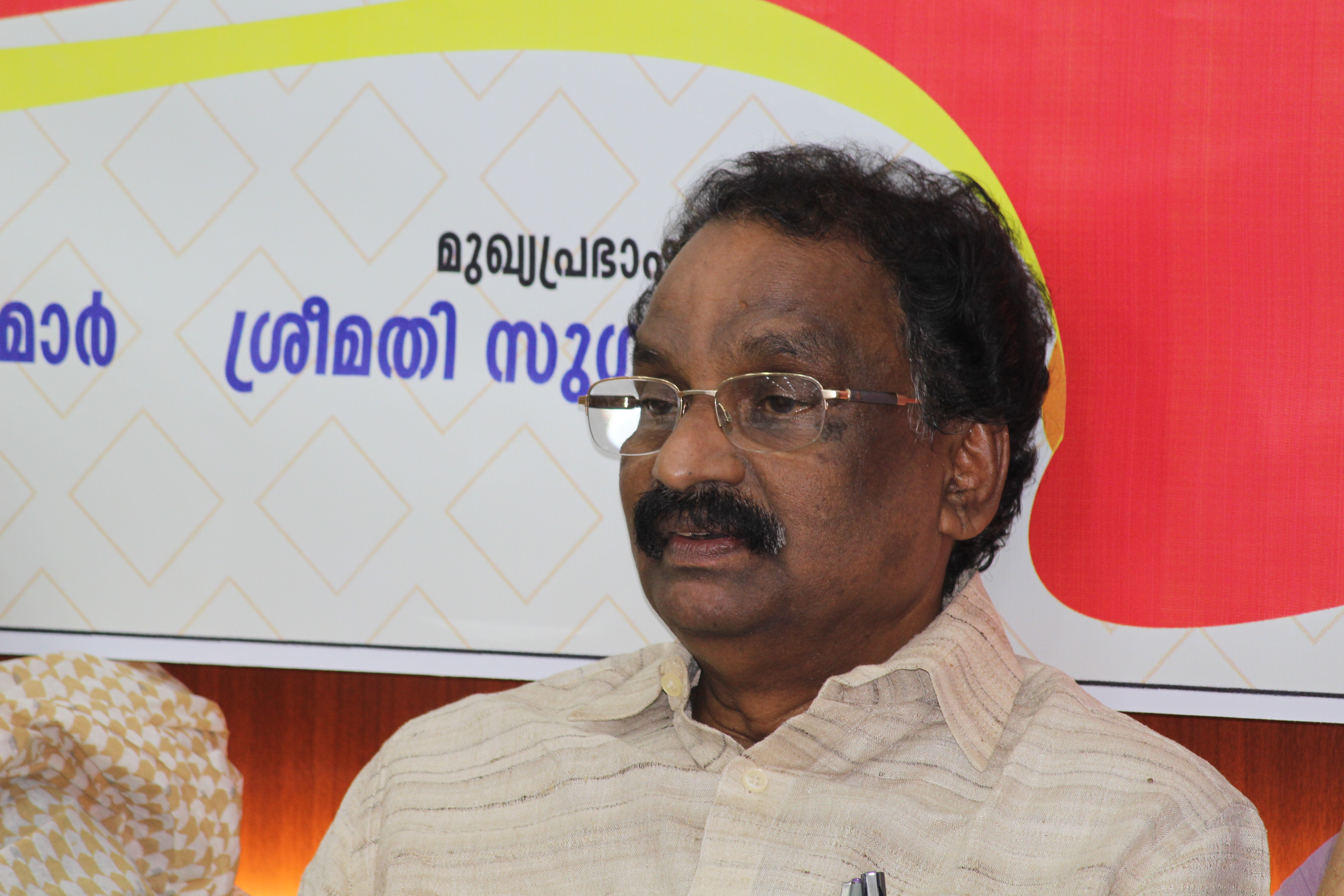
A. K. Balan - Minister for Law, Cultural Affairs, Parliamentary Affairs, SC/ST Development in Kerala Government

Balan entered politics through students movement and served as the President and the Secretary of Kerala State Committee of Students' Federation of India (SFI). He took part in 'Land Agitation' and imprisoned for 30 days in Kannur Central Prison. He was elected to Lok Sabha from Ottapalam constituency in 1980 and to Kerala Legislative Assembly from Kuzhalmannam in 2001.

He is first electricity minister of any state in Indian history to electrify a district completely. In February 2010, under his ministry Palakkad was declared first district in India to be fully electrified.

He is also having record of giving the most electricity connections to consumers in Kerala state. Kerala also won the National Award for Energy Conservation during his period as minister. He was the Minister for SC/ST, Law, Cultural Affairs and Parliamentary Affairs for the State of Kerala and the Central Committee member of CPIM.

== See also ==
- Kerala Council of Ministers
