= John Kuduvakkotte =

Indian politician

Member of the Kerala Legislative Assembly
- Constituency: Kuzhalmannam constituency

Personal details
- Born: 1905
- Died: 1968 (aged 62–63)

John Kuduvakkotte (1905 – 1968) was an Indian politician. He represented Kuzhalmannam constituency in the first and second Kerala legislative assemblies.
