= Tarur Assembly constituency =

Constituency of the Kerala legislative assembly in India

Tarur
- Constituency No. 57 for the Kerala Legislative Assembly
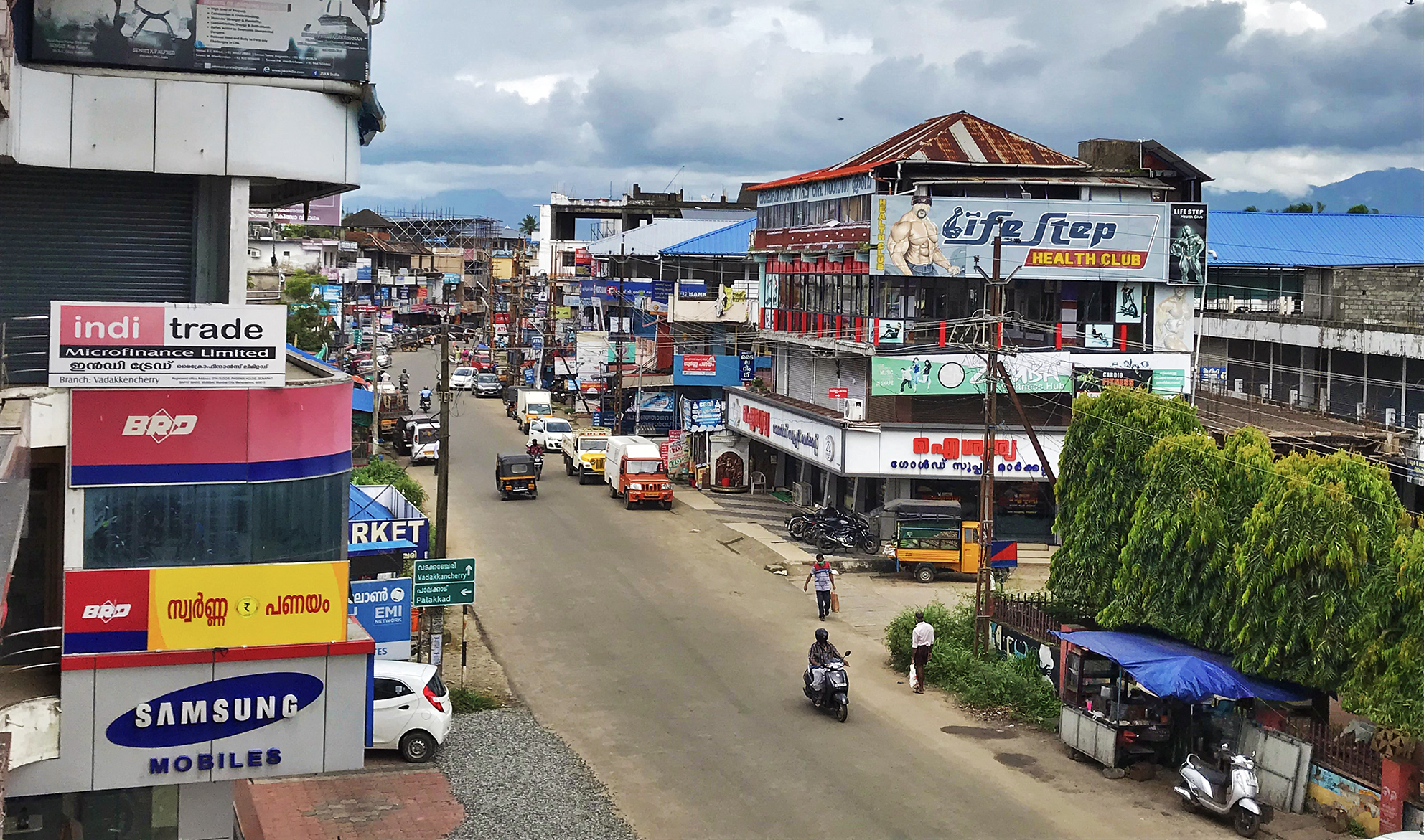
- Vadakkenchery Town

Constituency details
- Country: India
- Region: South India
- State: Kerala
- District: Palakkad
- Lok Sabha constituency: Alathur
- Established: 2008
- Total electors: 1,70,119 (2021)
- Reservation: SC

Member of Legislative Assembly
- 16th Kerala Legislative Assembly
- Incumbent P. P. Sumod
- Party: CPI(M)
- Alliance: LDF
- Elected year: 2026

Tarur is one of the 140 state legislative assembly constituencies in Kerala in southern India. It is also one of the seven state legislative assembly constituencies included in Alathur Lok Sabha constituency. As of the 2026 Kerala Legislative Assembly election, the current MLA is P. P. Sumod of CPI(M).

== Local self-governed segments ==
Tarur Assembly constituency consists of the local self-governed segments listed below:

| Sl no. | Name | Status (grama panchayat/municipality) | Taluk |
|---|---|---|---|
| 1 | Kannambra | Grama panchayat | Alathur |
| 2 | Kavasseri | Grama panchayat | Alathur |
| 3 | Kottayi | Grama Panchayat | Alathur |
| 4 | Kuthannoor | Grama panchayat | Alathur |
| 5 | Peringottukurissi | Grama panchayat | Alathur |
| 6 | Puducode | Grama panchayat | Alathur |
| 7 | Tarur | Grama panchayat | Alathur |
| 8 | Vadakkencherry | Grama panchayat | Alathur |

== Members of the Legislative Assembly ==
The following list contains all members of Kerala Legislative Assembly who have represented Tarur Assembly constituency during the period of various assemblies:

Key

CPI(M)

| Election | Niyama Sabha | Member | Party | Tenure |
|---|---|---|---|---|
| 2011 | 13th | A. K. Balan | CPI(M) | 2011 – 2016 |
| 2016 | 14th | A. K. Balan | CPI(M) | 2016 – 2021 |
| 2021 | 15th | P. P. Sumod | CPI(M) | 2021 - 2026 |
| 2026 | 16th | P. P. Sumod | CPI(M) | 2026 - |

== Election results ==
Percentage change (±%) denotes the change in the number of votes from the immediate previous election.

=== 2026 ===
2026 Kerala Legislative Assembly election: Tarur
| Party | Candidate | Votes | % | ±% |
|---|---|---|---|---|
| CPI(M) | P. P. Sumod | 60,557 | 45.79 | ▼5.79 |
| INC | K. C. Subramanian | 48,647 | 36.79 | ▲3.89 |
| BJP | M. Sureshbabu | 21,162 | 16.00 | ▲1.94 |
| BSP | Narayanankutty K. T. | 866 | 0.65 | |
| NOTA | None of the above | 1,014 | 0.77 | ▲0.05 |
| Margin of victory | | 11,910 | 9.00 | ▼9.67 |
| Turnout | | 1,32,246 | | |
| CPI(M) hold | | Swing | ▼5.79 | |

=== 2021 ===
2021 Kerala Legislative Assembly election: Tarur
| Party | Candidate | Votes | % | ±% |
|---|---|---|---|---|
| CPI(M) | P. P. Sumod | 67,744 | 51.58% | ▼0.67 |
| INC | K. A. Sheeba | 43,213 | 32.90% | ▼1.38 |
| BJP | Jayaprakashan K. P. | 18,465 | 14.06% | ▲1.99 |
| NOTA | None of the above | 940 | 0.72% | ▼0.16 |
| WPOI | C. A. Ushakumari | 985 | 0.75% | − |
| Margin of victory | | 24,531 | 18.67% | ▲0.7 |
| Turnout | | 1,28,310 | 78.13% | ▼2.96 |
| CPI(M) hold | | Swing | ▼0.67 | |

=== 2016 ===
There were 1,64,236 registered voters in Tarur Assembly constituency for the 2016 Kerala Assembly election.

2016 Kerala Legislative Assembly election: Tarur
| Party | Candidate | Votes | % | ±% |
|---|---|---|---|---|
| CPI(M) | A. K. Balan | 67,047 | 52.25% | ▼4.90 |
| INC | C. Prakash | 43,979 | 34.28% | ▲0.07 |
| BJP | K. V. Divakaran | 15,493 | 12.07% | ▲7.27 |
| NOTA | None of the above | 1,128 | 0.88% | − |
| BSP | K. T. Narayanankutty | 663 | 0.52% | ▼1.57 |
| Margin of victory | | 23,068 | 17.97% | ▼4.97 |
| Turnout | | 1,28,310 | 78.13% | ▼2.96 |
| CPI(M) hold | | Swing | ▼4.90 | |

=== 2011 ===
There were 1,49,387 registered voters in the constituency for the 2011 election.

2011 Kerala Legislative Assembly election: Tarur
| Party | Candidate | Votes | % | ±% |
|---|---|---|---|---|
| CPI(M) | A. K. Balan | 64,175 | 57.15% | |
| KC(J) | N. Vinesh | 38,419 | 34.21% | |
| BJP | M. Lakshmanan | 5,385 | 4.80% | |
| BSP | P. C. Narayanankutty | 2,346 | 2.09% | |
| Independent | K .Vinesh | 1,963 | 1.75% | |
| Margin of victory | | 25,756 | 22.94% | |
| Turnout | | 1,12,288 | 75.17% | |
| CPI(M) win (new seat) | | | | |

== See also ==
- Tarur
- Palakkad district
- List of constituencies of the Kerala Legislative Assembly
- 2016 Kerala Legislative Assembly election
