= Sajeev Joseph =

Indian politician (born 1972)

Member of Kerala Legislative Assembly
- Incumbent
- Assumed office 2021
- Preceded by: K. C. Joseph
- Constituency: Irikkur

Personal details
- Born: 16 September 1972 (age 54) India
- Party: Indian National Congress

Sajeev Joseph is an Indian politician born and brought up in Kerala and a member of the Indian National Congress. He is a member of the Kerala Legislative Assembly from Irikkur. Presently, he is also working as All India Congress Committee Foreign Affairs Dept. Secretary and General Secretary of Kerala Pradesh Congress Committee.

== Early life ==
Sajeev Joseph was born in a Christian (Syro Malabar Catholic) family to K. K. Joseph and Chinnamma Joseph on 16 September 1972. His family migrated from Kottayam to Kannur during his childhood. Sajeev completed his primary education from Govt. U. P. School Nuchiyad and Model Boys’ High School Payyannur.

Sajeev completed Bachelor's in Economics from Nirmalagiri College followed by LLB from Government Law College, Kozhikode. Sajeev practiced law in the Mattannur Magistrate Court, Thalassery Sessions Court and the Supreme Court of India. He was a member of Kannur District Consumer Forum. He worked as a Jury Member of the District Consumer Court Kannur for a period of four years, 2002 – 2007 and has practiced in various courts for 15 years. He was the Ex-President of Irikkur Block Agricultural Improvement Co-operative Bank and currently serves as its Director since past seven years. He serves as the Director of St. John Baptist English School, Kannur as well as the Chairman of KPM Trust, Kannur. He has participated in National Camps held by various youth and social organizations. In 1994, he acted as the Convener of the South Indians University Youth Festival and the Chairman of Calicut University Youth Festival.

== Present day ==
On 2 May 2021, the Irikkur elections results went live with the Congress retaining the Irikkur constituency seat as Sajeev Joseph won against Kerala Congress candidate Saji Kuttiyanimattam by 10,010 votes. As of the present, Sajeev Joseph has appeared on social media such as Instagram and Facebook along with videos being posted of things he's done as of 2022 by small Indian YouTubers. This is still ongoing to this day.
