= K. C. Joseph (Irikkur politician) =

Indian politician

Minister for Rural Development, Planning, Culture and NORKA
- In office 18 December 2011 – 20 May 2016
- Preceded by: M. A. Baby (culture)
- Succeeded by: A. C. Moideen (Rural Development); A. K. Balan (culture); Pinarayi Vijayan (NORKA)

Member of Legislative Assembly
- In office 1982–2021
- Preceded by: Kadannappalli Ramachandran
- Succeeded by: Sajeev Joseph
- Constituency: Irikkur

Personal details
- Born: 3 June 1946 (age 80) Poovam, Changanassery, Kottayam, Kerala, India
- Party: Indian National Congress
- Spouse: Sarah Joseph

Karuvelithara Chacko Joseph is a senior Indian politician and long term member of the Indian National Congress. He was the former Minister for Rural Development, Planning & Culture of the Government of Kerala from the year 2011 to 2016. He represented the Irikkur Assembly constituency in the Kerala Legislative Assembly eight times from 1982 to 2021.

== Portfolio ==
Rural Development, Planning and Economic Affairs, Culture, Dairy Development, Milk Co-operatives, Non-Resident Keralites Affairs & Information and Public Relations.

Son of Shri.K.M.Chacko and Smt. Thresiamma Chacko; born at Poovam near Changanassery on 3 June 1946; M.A., LLB; Advocate; social and Political Worker.

He completed his pre degree and BA Economics from SB College Changanasserry and Entered Politics through All Kerala Balajana Sakhyam and KSU. Was General Secretary of All Kerala Balajana Sakhyam; President, KSU Kottayam District Committee; Vice President, KSU State Committee; Secretary, Kerala University Union; General Secretary, National Council of National Students Union of India; Was President Kerala Pradesh Youth Congress; Was Member, Kerala University Syndicate, Executive Committee of Kerala Agricultural University; Convener, Standing Committee of Syndicate on Finance; Managing Editor, "Socialist Youth" Weekly. He was the President of District Congress Committee, Kottayam.

Also served as Member, AICC; Secretary, Congress Legislature Party; Chairman, Committee on Privileges and Ethics; Committee on Private Members Bills and Resolutions. Previously elected to K.L.A. in 1982, 1987, 1991, 1996, 2001, 2006, 2011 and 2016.

He was elected from Irikkur Constituency to the Kerala Legislative Assembly representing Indian National Congress continuously from 1982 to 2021.

- Government of Kerala
- Kerala Ministers

One of the representatives of Malabar Migrants.
