= Anjumoorthy Temple =

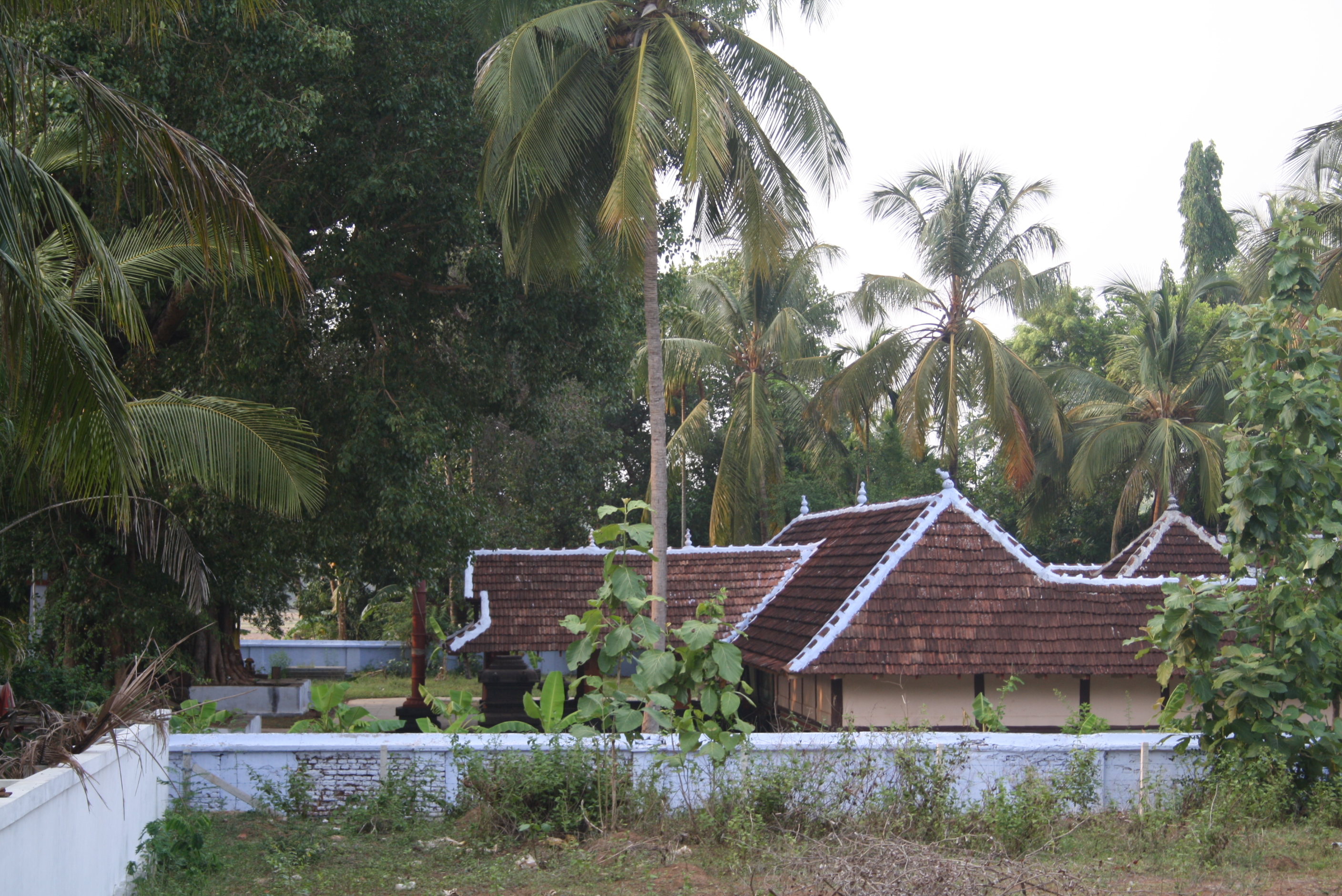
- Anjumoorthy Temple, Palakkad district

- Anjumoorthy Temple, Anjumoorthy, Palakkad, Kerala

Religion
- Affiliation: Hinduism
- District: Palakkad
- Deity: Sudarshana

Location
- Location: Anjumoorthy
- State: Kerala
- Country: India
- Interactive map of Anjumoorthy Temple
- Coordinates: 10.6178°N 76.5025°E

Architecture
- Type: Architecture of Kerala
- Completed: 500 years ago

Specifications
- Temple: five
- Elevation: 82.43 m (270 ft)

Anjumoorthy Temple is a Hindu temple at Anjumoorthy neighbourhood in Palakkad district, Kerala in India. It is one of the 108 Shiva Temples in India.

== Location ==
This temple is located with the coordinates of (10.6178°N 76.5025°E) at Anjumoorthy village, also called Anjumoorthy Mangalam and this temple is about 1500 years old.

Anjumoorthy Temple (Kerala)
