= P. P. Sumod =

Indian politician

Member of the Kerala Legislative Assembly
- Incumbent
- Assumed office 24 May 2021
- Preceded by: A. K. Balan
- Constituency: Tarur

Personal details
- Born: Kerala, India
- Party: Communist Party of India (Marxist)
- Education: Bachelor of Education; Master of Arts
- Alma mater: Sree Narayana Campus of Teacher Education, Kottappuram; Sree Neelakanta Government Sanskrit College Pattambi

P. P. Sumod is an Indian politician from Kerala, who is a member of the Communist Party of India (Marxist). He is currently serving as a member of the Kerala Legislative Assembly representing Tarur constituency since 24 May 2021.
