= Kuzhalmannam-II =

- village
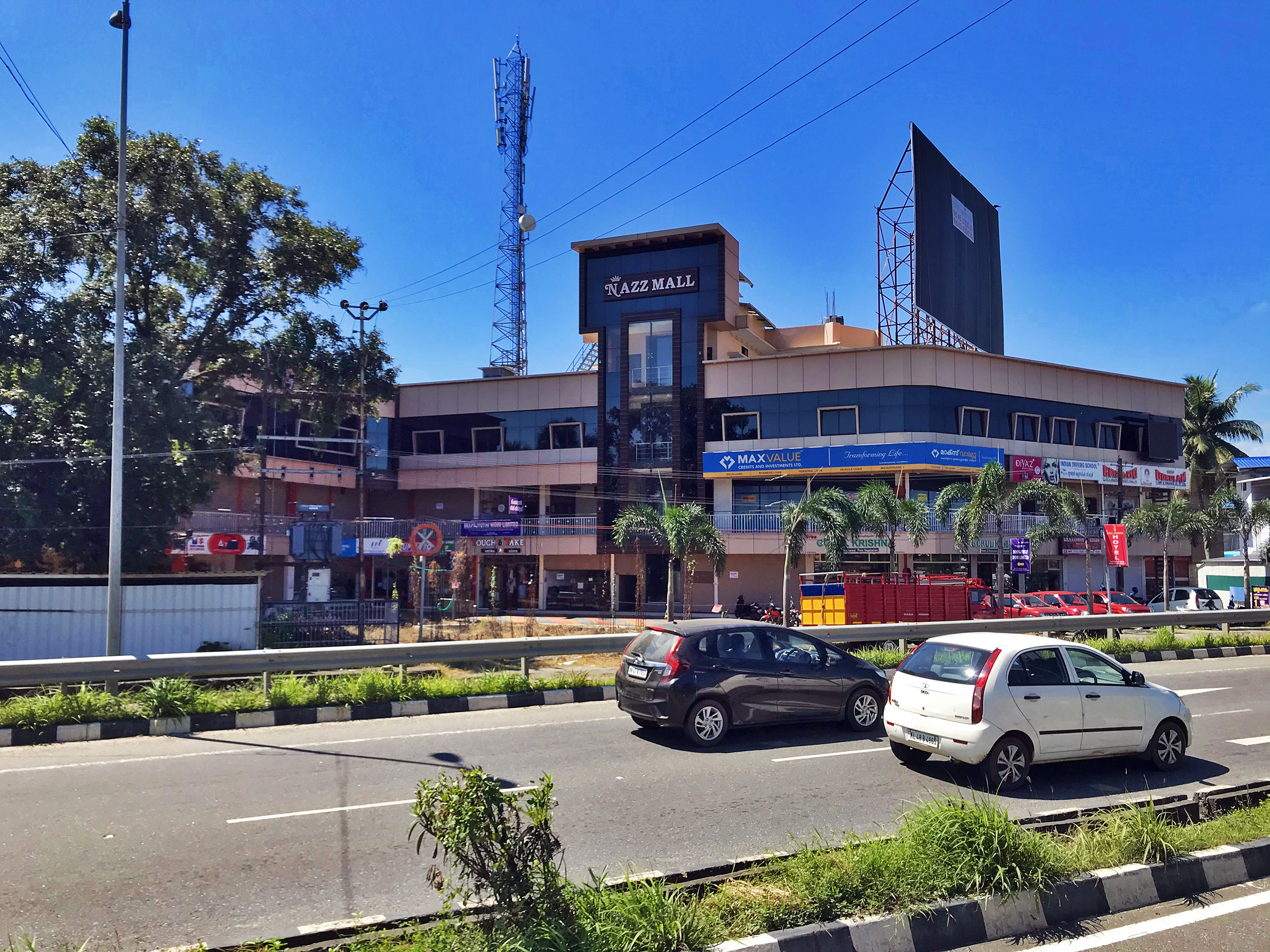
- Country: India
- State: Kerala
- District: Palakkad

Population (2011)
  - Total: 9,354

Languages
  - Official: Malayalam, English
- Time zone: UTC+5:30 (IST)
- PIN: 6XXXXX
- Vehicle registration: KL-

Kuzhalmannam-II is a village in Palakkad district in the state of Kerala, India. It forms a part of the Kuzhalmannam gram panchayat, along with Kuzhalmannam-I.

== Demographics ==
As of 2011 India census, Kuzhalmannam-II had a population of 9,354 with 4,500 males and 4,854 females.
