= Kuzhalmannam-I =

- village
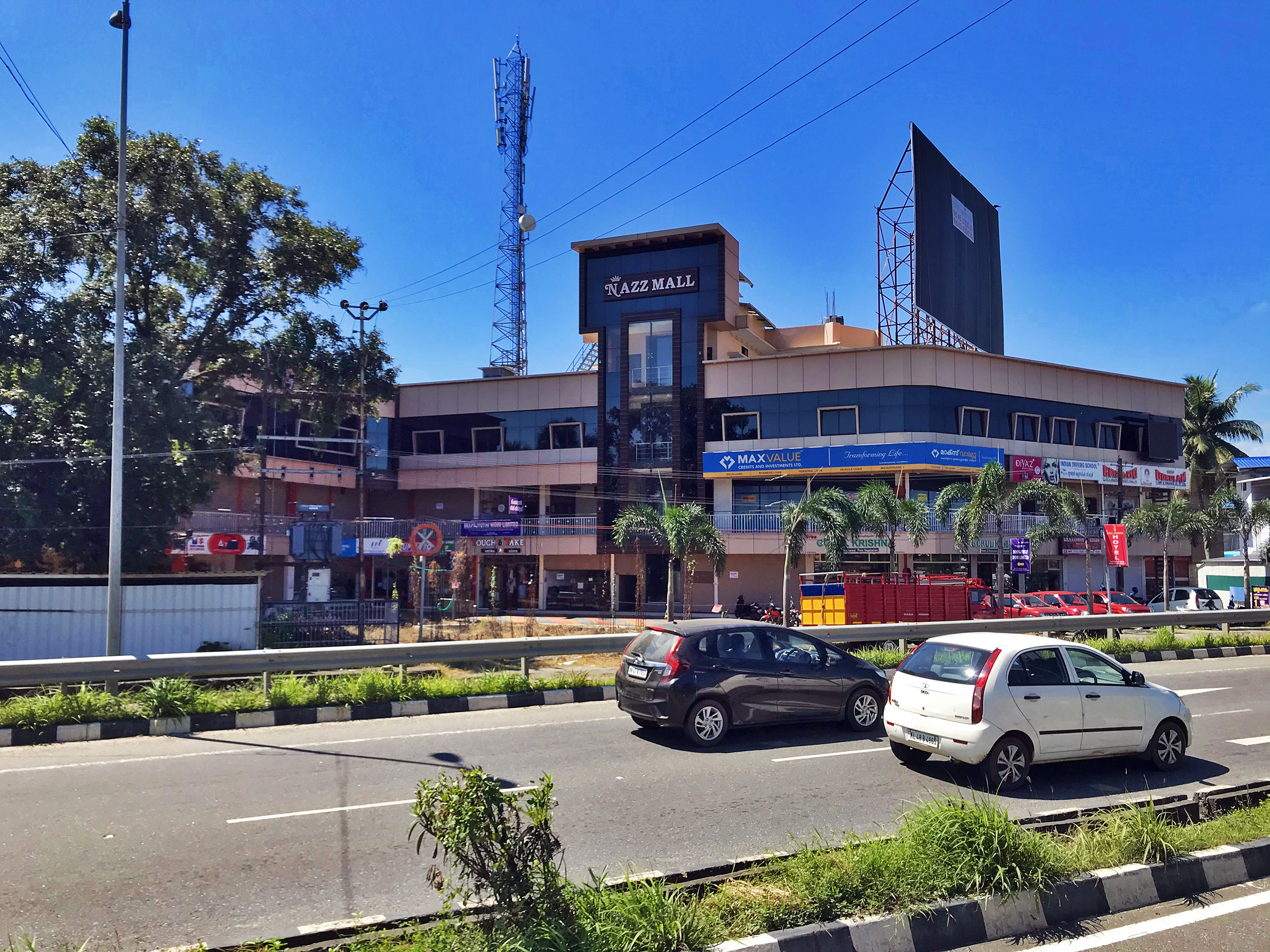
- Kuzhalmannam Junction

- Location in Kerala, India Kuzhalmannam-I (India)
- Coordinates: 10.7192°N 76.6012°E
- Country: India
- State: Kerala
- District: Palakkad

Population (2011)
  - Total: 17,848

Languages
  - Official: Malayalam, English
- Time zone: UTC+5:30 (IST)
- PIN: 678702
- Vehicle registration: KL-

Kuzhalmannam-I is a village in the Palakkad district, state of Kerala, India. It forms a part of the Kuzhalmannam gram panchayat, along with Kuzhalmannam-II.

== Demographics ==
As of 2011 India census, Kuzhalmannam-I had a population of 17,848 with 8,700 males and 9,148 females.

== Facilities ==
Map view of facilities in and around Kuzalmannam
