= Vadakkancheri-I =

- village
- Country: India
- State: Kerala
- District: Palakkad

Population (2011)
  - Total: 20,973

Languages
  - Official: Malayalam, English
- Time zone: UTC+5:30 (IST)
- PIN: 6XXXXX
- Vehicle registration: KL-

Vadakkancheri-I is a village in Palakkad district in the state of Kerala, India. It is a part of the Vadakkancheri gram panchayat along with Vadakkancheri-II.

== Demographics ==
As of 2011 India census, Vadakkancheri-I had a population of 20,973 with 10,189 males and 10,784 females.
