= K. C. Joseph =

K. C. Joseph may refer to:

- K. C. Joseph (Irikkur politician) (born 1946), present Minister for Rural Development & registration of the Government of Kerala and representative of the Irikkur constituency
- K. C. Joseph (Kuttanadu politician) (born 1949), a member of the Legislative Assembly for Kuttanadu in 1982
