= Tarur-II =

- village
- Country: India
- State: Kerala
- District: Palakkad

Population (2011)
  - Total: 13,376

Languages
  - Official: Malayalam, English
- Time zone: UTC+5:30 (IST)
- PIN: 6XXXXX
- Vehicle registration: KL-

Tarur-II is a village in the Palakkad district, state of Kerala, India. It forms a part of Tarur gram panchayat, together with Tarur-I.

== Demographics ==
As of 2011 India census, Tarur-II had a population of 13,376 with 6,568 males and 6,808 females.
