= Tarur-I =

- village
- Interactive map of Tarur-I
- Coordinates: 10°40′20″N 76°28′10″E
- Country: India
- State: Kerala
- District: Palakkad

Population (2011)
  - Total: 12,617

Languages
  - Official: Malayalam, English
- Time zone: UTC+5:30 (IST)
- PIN: 6XXXXX
- Vehicle registration: KL 49 -

Tarur-I is a village in Palakkad district in the state of Kerala, India. It forms a part of Tarur gram panchayat, together with Tarur-II.

== Demographics ==
As of 2011 India census, Tarur-I had a population of 12,617 with 6,031 males and 6,586 females.
