= T. C. Narayanan Nambiar =

Indian politician

Member of the Kerala Legislative Assembly
- Incumbent
- Assumed office 1957
- Constituency: Irikkur

Personal details
- Born: 1 July 1914
- Died: 26 June 1995 (aged 80)

T. C. Narayanan Nambiar (1 July 1914 – 26 June 1995) was an Indian politician. He represented Irikkur Assembly constituency in the first and second Kerala Legislative Assembly.

== Life ==
Nambiar joined the Congress in 1930 and had participated in farmers' struggles. He has served several prison terms. Later he became a member of the Communist Party. Nambiar represented Communist Party of India and came to the Kerala Legislative Assembly in 1957. He was also a member of the Madras Legislative Assembly in 1952. He was a member of several committees. He served as the chairman of Estimates Committee from 1957 to 1960, chairman of Public Accounts Committee from 1960 to 1963. He was the Chief Whip of CPI in Madras Assembly and served as a member of Kerala University Senate. Narayanan Nambiar has worked as an editor for the publication Keraladayam. In 1957, he won from the Irikkur constituency in the first Kerala Assembly. He was also elected into the second Kerala Legislative assembly. Nambiar died on 26 June 1995 due to age related issues.
