= Tarur Gram Panchayat =

Gram Panchayat in Kerala, India

Coordinates: 17°17′N 78°37′E

Tarur is a gram panchayat in the Palakkad district, state of Kerala, India. It is the local government organisation that serves the villages of Tarur-I and Tarur-II.
