= Vadakkancheri-II =

- Village
- Country: India
- State: Kerala
- District: Palakkad

Population (2011)
  - Total: 14,918

Languages
  - Official: Malayalam, English
- Time zone: UTC+5:30 (IST)
- PIN: 6XXXXX
- Vehicle registration: KL-

Vadakkancheri-II is a village in Palakkad district in the state of Kerala, India. It is a part of the Vadakkancheri gram panchayat, along with Vadakkancheri-I.

== Demographics ==
As of 2011 India census, Vadakkancheri-II had a population of 14,918 with 7,160 males and 7,758 females.
