= Vadakkencherry Gram Panchayat =

Gram Panchayat in Palakkad district of Kerala, India

Vadakkencherry (IPA: [ʋɐɖɐkːɐɲdʒeːɾi]) is a gram panchayat in the Palakkad district, state of Kerala, India. It is a local government organisation that serves the villages of Vadakkancheri-I and Vadakkancheri-II.
