= Kuzhalmannam Gram Panchayat =

Gram Panchayat in Palakkad district of Kerala, India

Coordinates: 10.6600°N 76.7000°E

Kuzhalmannam (Kozhalmannam, Coyalmannam, കുഴൽമന്ദം ) is a gram panchayat in the Palakkad district, state of Kerala, India. It is a local government organisation that serves the villages of Kuzhalmannam-I and Kuzhalmannam-II.

== Pictures ==
Kuzhalmannam
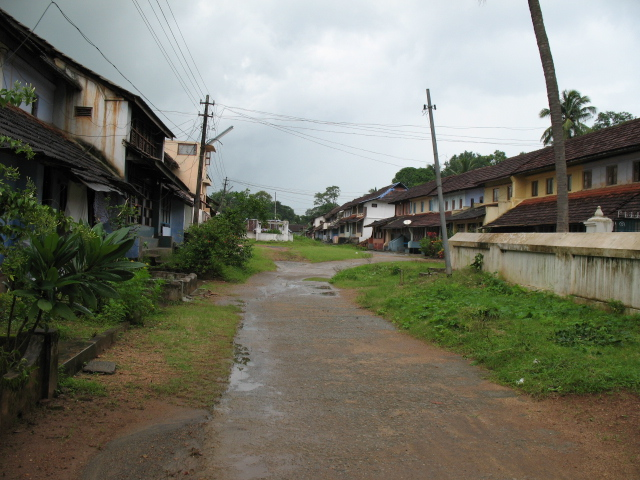
Kuzhalmannam

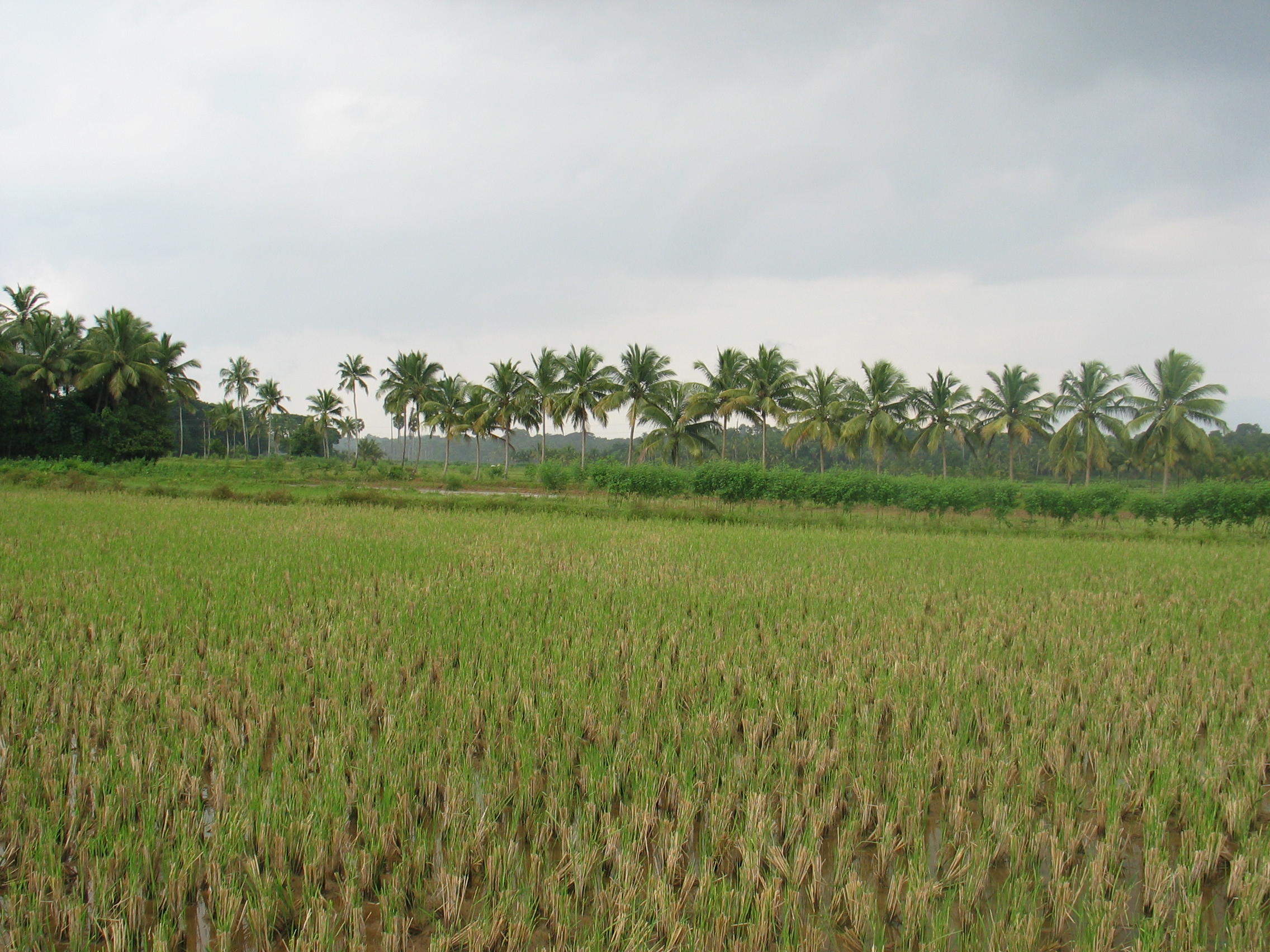
Paddy Fields

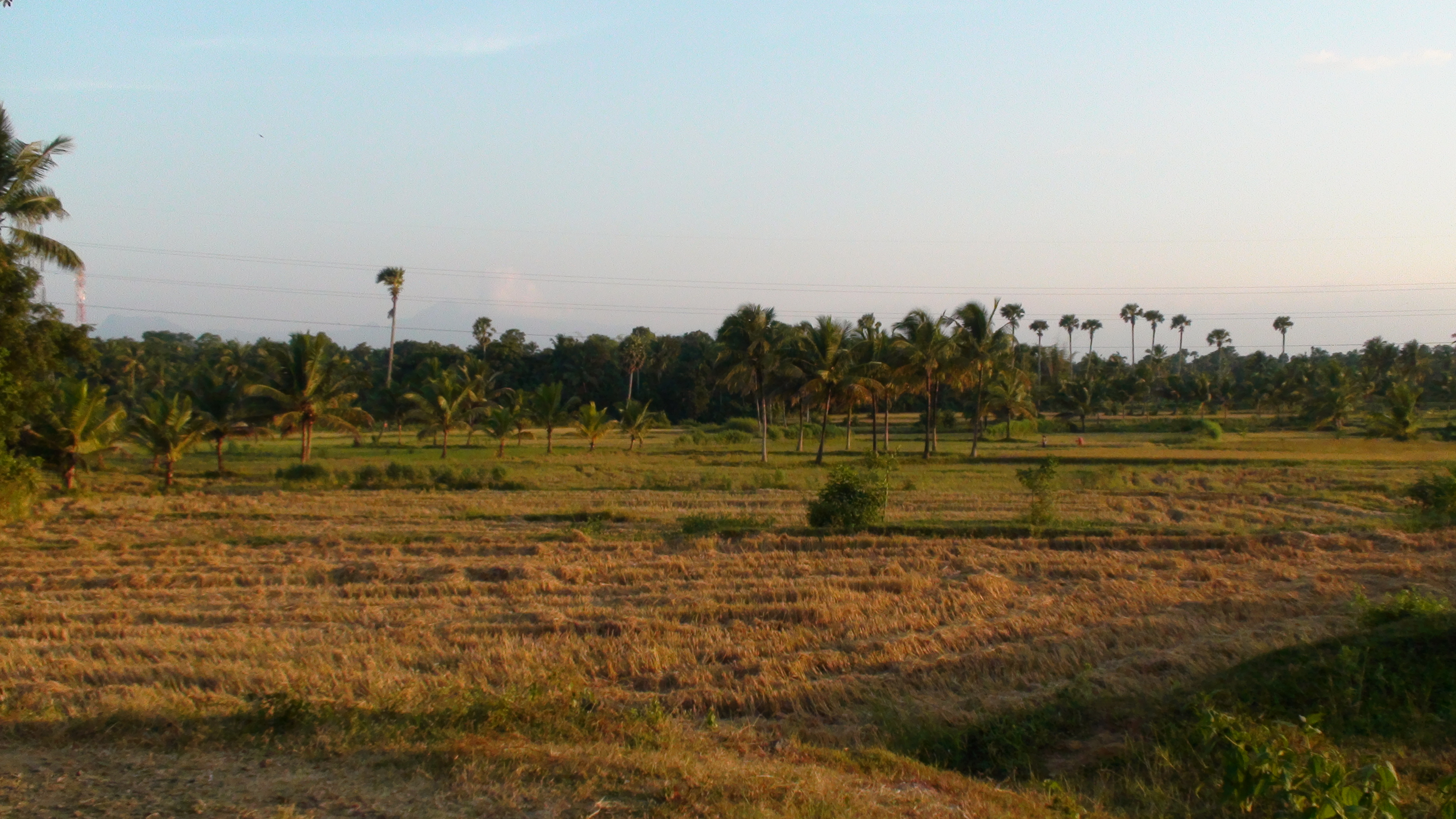
Paddy Fields

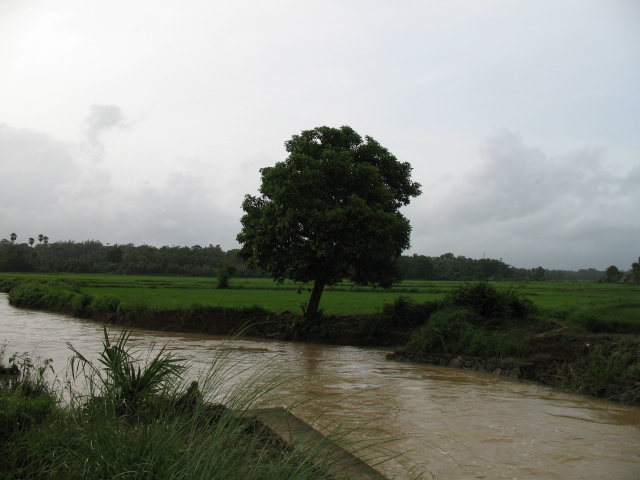
Paddy Illathkalam

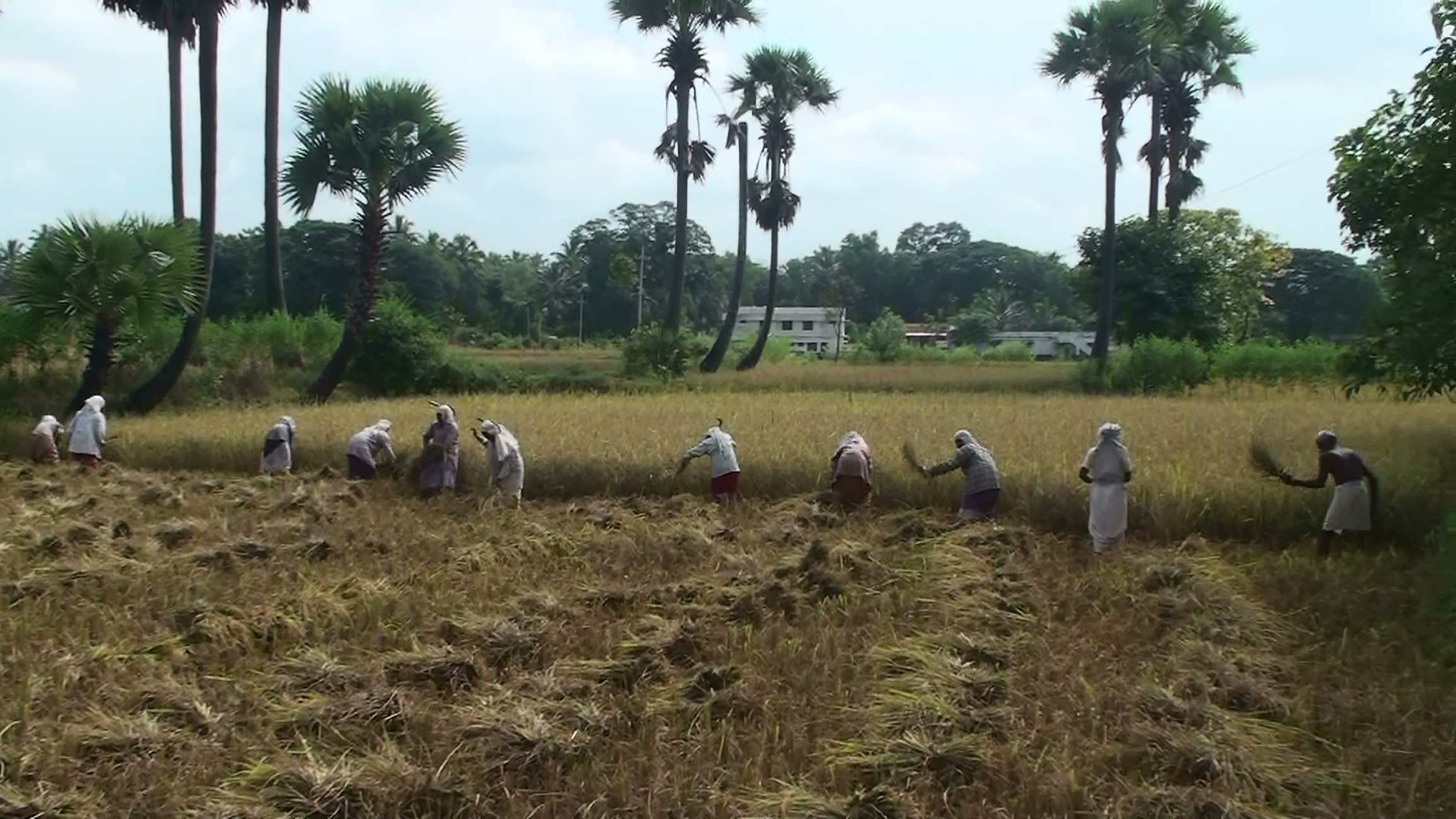
Traditional harvesting

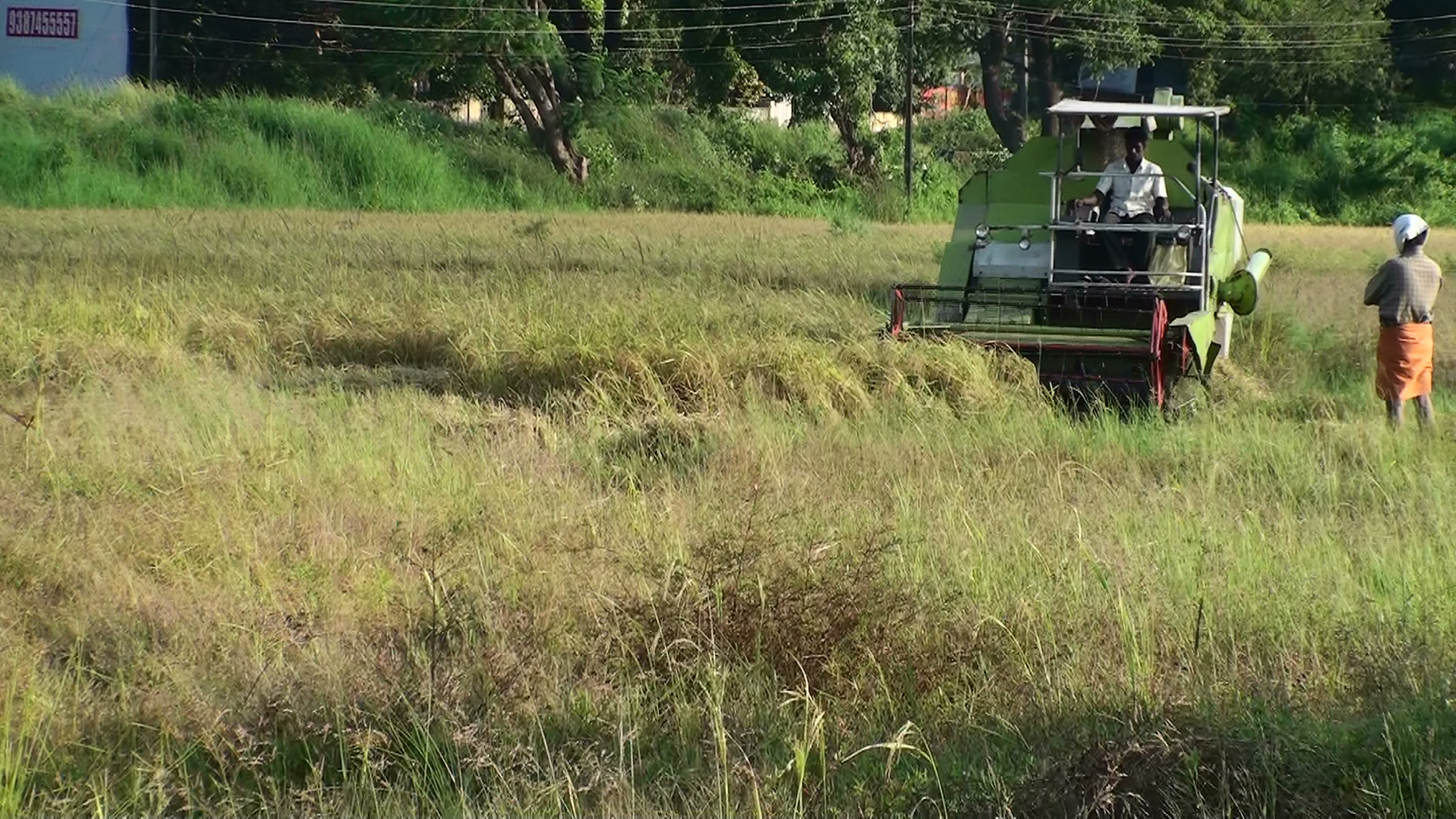
Mechanical harvesting
