= Kayamkulam Assembly constituency =

Constituency of the Kerala legislative assembly in India

Kayamkulam
- Constituency No. 108 for the Kerala Legislative Assembly
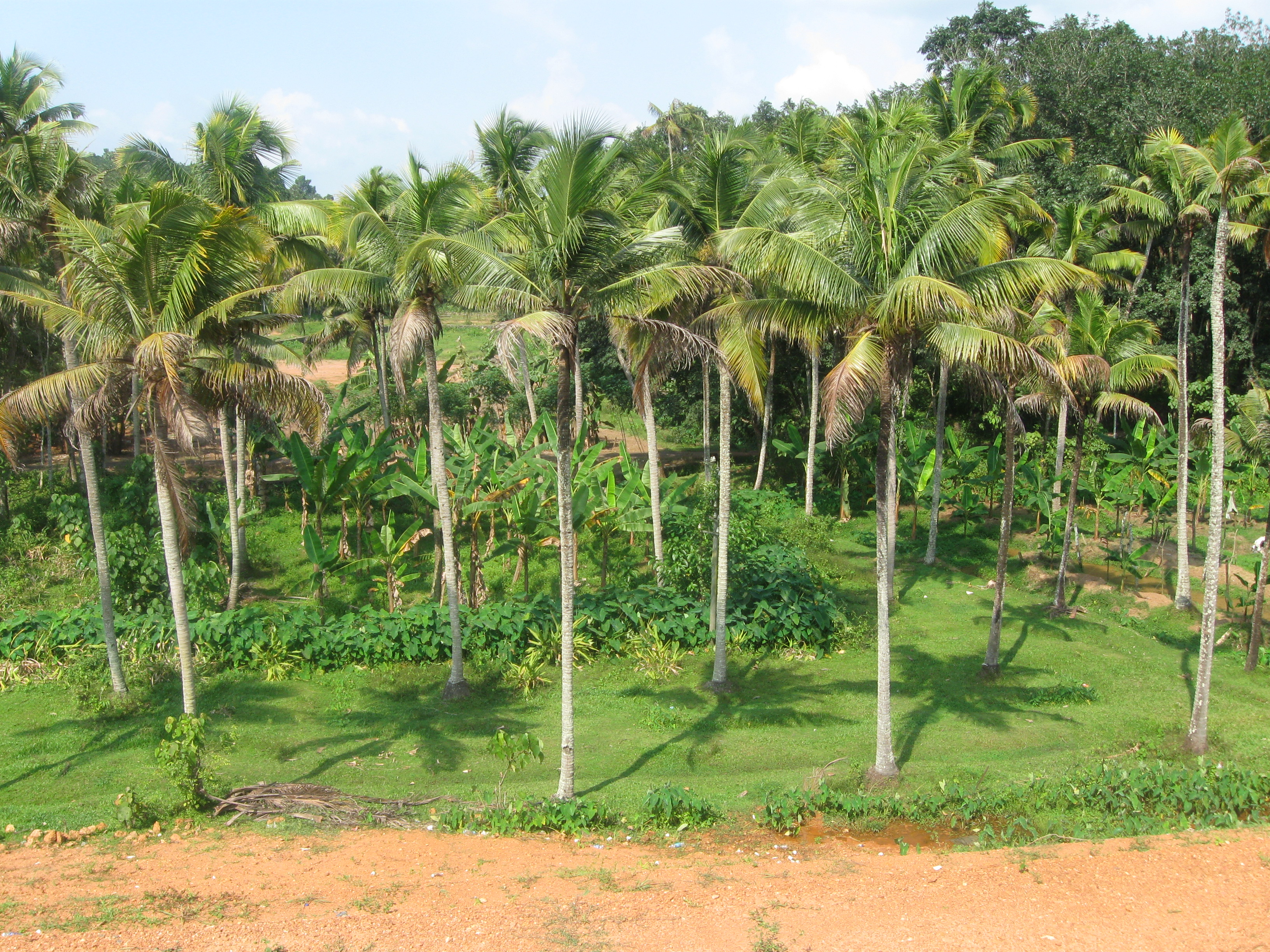
- Coconut tree orchard near Kayamkulam

Constituency details
- Country: India
- Region: South India
- State: Kerala
- District: Alappuzha
- Lok Sabha constituency: Alappuzha
- Established: 1957
- Total electors: 2,03,308 (2016)
- Reservation: None

Member of Legislative Assembly
- 16th Kerala Legislative Assembly
- Incumbent M. Liju
- Party: Indian National Congress
- Elected year: 2026

Kayamkulam State assembly constituency is one of the 140 state legislative assembly constituencies in Kerala in southern India. It is also one of the seven state legislative assembly constituencies included in Alappuzha Lok Sabha constituency. The current MLA is M. Liju of Indian National Congress.

== Local self-governed segments ==
Kayamkulam Assembly constituency is composed of the following local self-governed segments:

Sl no.	Name	Status (Grama panchayat/Municipality)	Taluk
1	Kayamkulam	Municipality	Karthikappally
2	Devikulangara	Grama panchayat	Karthikappally
3	Kandalloor	Grama panchayat	Karthikappally
4	Krishnapuram	Grama panchayat	Karthikappally
5	Pathiyoor	Grama panchayat	Karthikappally
6	Bharanikkavu	Grama panchayat	Mavelikkara
7	Chettikulangara	Grama panchayat	Mavelikkara

== Members of Legislative Assembly ==
The following list contains all members of Kerala Legislative Assembly who have represented the constituency:

Election	Niyama Sabha	Name	Party	Tenure
1957	1st	K. O. Aysha Bai	Communist Party of India	1957 – 1960
1960	2nd	K. O. Aysha Bai	Communist Party of India	1960 – 1965
1967	3rd	P. K. Kungu	Samyukta Socialist Party	1967 – 1970
1970	4th	Thundathil Kunjukrishna Pillai	Indian National Congress	1970 – 1977
1977	5th	Thundathil Kunjukrishna Pillai	Indian National Congress	1977 – 1980
1980	6th	Thachadi Prabhakaran	Indian National Congress	1980 – 1982
1982	7th	Thachadi Prabhakaran	Indian national congress (s)Independent symbol	1982 – 1987
1987	8th	M. R. Gopalakrishnan	Communist Party of India	1987 – 1991
1991	9th	Thachadi Prabhakaran	Indian National Congress	1991 – 1996
1996	10th	G. Sudhakaran	Communist Party of India	1996 – 2001
2001	11th	M. M. Hassan	Indian National Congress	2001 – 2006
2006	12th	C. K. Sadasivan	Communist Party of India	2006 – 2016
2011	13th	C. K. Sadasivan	Communist Party of India	2006 – 2016
2016	14th	U. Prathibha	Communist Party of India	2016 - 2026
2021	15th	U. Prathibha	Communist Party of India	2016 - 2026
2026	16th	M.Liju	Indian National Congress	Incumbent

== Election results ==
Percentage change (±%) denotes the change in the number of votes from the immediate previous election.

=== 2026 ===
2026 Kerala Legislative Assembly election: Kayamkulam
Party	Candidate	Votes	%	±%
INC	M. Liju	76,651	49.33	▲5.27
CPI(M)	U. Prathibha	61,079	39.30	▼8.67
BDJS	Thampi Mettuthara	16,973	10.92	▲3.84
NOTA	None of the above	696	0.45	
Margin of victory		15,572	10.03	
Turnout		1,55,399		
INC gain from CPI(M)		Swing	▲5.27	

By Assembly Segments
No.	Status (Assembly Constituency)	Votes			Lead
No.	Status (Assembly Constituency)	M. Liju	U. Prathibha	Thampi Mettuthara	Lead
1	Pathiyoor	12,358	11,031	3,137	1,327
2	Chettikulangara	7,174	7,184	2,993	10
3	Kayamkulam Municipality	16,003	10,003	1,977	5,969
4	Kandalloor	10,235	8,051	2,020	2,184
5	Devikulangara	7,528	6,130	1,761	1,345
6	Krishnapuram	13,838	11,236	3,418	2,602
7	Bharanikkavu	8,043	6,284	1,365	1,759
	Postal Ballot	1,472	1,129	302	343

|}

=== 2021 ===
There were 2,14,839 registered voters in the constituency for the 2021 Kerala Assembly election.

2021 Kerala Legislative Assembly election: Kayamkulam
Party	Candidate	Votes	%	±%
CPI(M)	U. Prathibha	77,348	47.97	▲1.44
INC	Aritha Babu	71,050	44.06	▲4.01
BDJS	P. Pradeeplal	11,413	7.08	▼5.67
Independent	Maniyappan Achari	367	0.47	▼0.24
Independent	Rajeev R	231	0.14	−
Independent	Geevarghese Samuel	205	0.13	−
SUCI(C)	Myna Gopinath	150	0.09	−
Independent	Sathyanarayanan S	73	0.05	−
Margin of victory		6,298	3.88	▼2.75
Turnout		16,21,93	75.47	▼1.66
CPI(M) hold		Swing	▼3.91	

=== 2016 ===
There were 2,03,308 registered voters in the constituency for the 2016 Kerala Assembly election.

2016 Kerala Legislative Assembly election: Kayamkulam
Party	Candidate	Votes	%	±%
CPI(M)	U. Prathibha	72,956	46.53	▼1.75
INC	M. Liju	61,099	38.96	▼8.38
BDJS	Shaji M. Panicker	20,000	12.75	▲10.54
PDP	Muttam Nazar	1,125	0.72	−
Independent	Maniyappan Achari	739	0.47	−
NOTA	None of the above	458	0.29	−
Independent	G. Veena	177	0.11	
Independent	Ajith P.	159	0.10	
Independent	Liju M.	93	0.06	
Margin of victory		11,857	7.57	▲6.63
Turnout		1,56,806	77.13	▲0.43
CPI(M) hold		Swing	▼1.75	

=== 2011 ===
There were 1,82,036 registered voters in the constituency for the 2011 election.

2011 Kerala Legislative Assembly election: Kayamkulam
Party	Candidate	Votes	%	±%
CPI(M)	C. K. Sadasivan	67,409	48.28	
INC	M. Murali	66,094	47.34	
BJP	T. O. Noushad	3,083	2.21	
Independent	K. Sadasivan	744	0.53	−
Independent	Murali	704	0.50	−
BSP	Ambujan	602	0.43	−
Independent	Shal Mohan	585	0.42	
Independent	Kalesh Manimandiram	405	0.29	
Margin of victory		1,315	0.94	
Turnout		1,39,626	76.70	
CPI(M) hold		Swing		

=== 2006 ===
There were 1,29,524 registered voters in the constituency for the 2006 election.

2006 Kerala Legislative Assembly election: Kayamkulam
Party	Candidate	Votes	%	±%
CPI(M)	C. K. Sadasivan	49,697	49.8	
INC	Adv. C. R. Jayaprakash	43,865	43.9	
BJP	Palamuttathu Vijayakumar	4,676	4.7	
BSP	D. Suresh Kumar	448	0.5	
Independent	K. Sadasivan	358	0.4	
Independent	C. N. Jayaprakash	234	0.2	
Independent	E. N. Shanthiraj	203	0.2	
Independent	Dr. K. Kishore Kumar	189	0.2	
Independent	K. B. Jayaprakash	151	0.2	
Margin of victory		5,832	5.8	
Turnout		99,833	77.1	
CPI(M) gain from INC		Swing		

=== 2001 ===
There were 1,44,418 registered voters in the constituency for the 2001 election.

2001 Kerala Legislative Assembly election: Kayamkulam
Party	Candidate	Votes	%	±%
INC	M. M. Hassan	52,444	48.9	
CPI(M)	G. Sudhakaran	50,680	47.3	
BJP	Parayil Radhakrishnan	2,931	2.7	
Independent	G. Sudhakaran	694	0.7	
Independent	Syamala	502	0.5	
Margin of victory		1,764	1.6	
Turnout		1,07,289	74.3	
INC gain from CPI(M)		Swing		

== See also ==
- Kayamkulam
- Alappuzha district
- List of constituencies of the Kerala Legislative Assembly
- 2016 Kerala Legislative Assembly election
