= Sunil Kandalloor =

Indian wax sculptor

Sunil Kandalloor is a Mumbai-based artist who specializes in wax sculptures. He is arguably the most well known wax sculpture artist in the country having wax museums at Lonavala in Pune, Maharashtra, Devgad in Konkan, Maharashtra, and Sunil's Wax Museum in Thiruvananthapuram, Kerala. His works include sculptors of famous personalities at state, national and international level ranging from Adolf Hitler and Mahatma Gandhi to Narendra Modi, the latest being the wax sculpture of justice V R Krishna Iyer.

== Life and work ==
Born in Kandalloor, a small village in Alappuzha district of Kerala, Sunil is a diploma holder in Fine Arts from Madhava Fine Arts College, Kerala. Sunil's life took a turn when a photograph of the wax models of Fidel Castro and Jesse Owens published by a magazine caught his eye. It was then he decided to try wax sculpting. He did a short course in sculpturing and started experimenting with clay models and later with wax. He spent eight years in his room experimenting on factors like the type of wax to be used, shades of colour to be used, the type of hair and clothes to be selected to make wax models. Sunil's first wax sculpture was a bust of Lord Krishna, inspired by a poster, which he had bought from the Guruvayur temple. It was modelled in clay first and then experimented with wax. The sculpture was reworked thirty times before he succeeded. The final version is on display at the Devaswom museum at Guruvayur Sree Krishna temple in Kerala. His first full figure wax model was of former Kerala Chief Minister K Karunakaran. The model was made while he was the Chief Minister. Creating this first model was an arduous task which took him seven months. Candle wax is used for the sculptures, real hair for the model's hair and acrylic eyes. Besides salons, he collects hair of various colours and texture from Palani, a pilgrimage centre in Tamil Nadu. The grey hair comes from a group of grannies and grandpas—Sunil's well-wishers in his village. The skin tone is attained by adding tempera colours. The final touch comes with the costume and shoes, mostly straight out of the celebrity's personal wardrobe. Sunil opened his first celebrity Wax Museum at KanyaKumari with twenty five wax models but it closed down. The wax museum on Lonavala was opened in the year 2000 and the one in Kochi in 2014.New museum is recently opened near padmanabha swamy temple, trivandrum in 2019.

== Future plans ==
Sunil intends to open a branch of his International Wax Museum in Colaba, Mumbai. Along with that an institute to teach wax sculpting is also in his mind.
