= Sudhesan Midhun =

Indian cricketer (born 1994)

Personal information
- Born: 7 October 1994 (age 32); Kayamkulam, Kerala, India
- Height: 1.75 m (5 ft 9 in)
- Batting: Right-handed
- Bowling: Legbreak googly
- Role: Bowler

Domestic team information
- Years: Team
- 2018–present: Kerala
- 2019: Rajasthan Royals

Career statistics
Competition	FC	LA	T20
Matches	1	5	23
Runs scored	0	13	23
Batting average	–	6.50	5.75
100s/50s	0/0	0/0	0/0
Top score	0	13	17
Balls bowled	110	258	500
Wickets	3	5	23
Bowling average	17.00	38.40	24.56
5 wickets in innings	0	0	0
10 wickets in match	0	0	0
Best bowling	3/51	3/56	4/5
Catches/stumpings	0/0	0/0	4/0
- Source: ESPNcricinfo, 3 February 2022

Sudhesan Midhun (born 7 October 1994) is an Indian cricketer who represents Kerala in domestic cricket. He is a right handed batter and right-handed legbreak googly bowler.

== Early life ==
Midhun hails from Pullukulangara, near Kayamkulam in Alappuzha district of Kerala. His father, Sudhesan is a grocery shop owner. Midhun starred playing cricket at the age of 13 and has trained in Shot Cricket Club, Kandalloor and Travancore Cricket Academy, Kayamkulam.

== Domestic career ==
In 2018, he picked up a hat-trick against Andhra Pradesh in the Under-23 BCCI tourney.

Midhun made his Twenty20 debut for Kerala in the 2017-18 Syed Mushtaq Ali Trophy on 11 January 2018 against Andhra Pradesh. He made his List A debut for Kerala in the 2017–18 Vijay Hazare Trophy on 7 February 2018 against Bengal. He made his first-class debut on 17 December 2019, for Kerala in the 2019–20 Ranji Trophy against Bengal.

He was the joint-highest wicket-taker of Kerala in the 2021-22 Syed Mushtaq Ali Trophy bagging eight wickets from 6 matches.

== Indian Premier League ==
On 28 January 2018, he was signed by Rajasthan Royals in the 2018 Indian Premier League auction for ₹20 lakh. In 2019 Indian Premier League, he made his IPL debut for Rajasthan against Kolkata Knight Riders. He was released by the Rajasthan Royals ahead of the 2020 IPL auction.

== International career ==
He was one of the seven reserve players for India's series against West Indies in 2022.
