= Department of Taxes (Kerala) =

Revenue department of Kerala state, India

- Emblem of Kerala

Agency overview
- Jurisdiction: Government of Kerala
- Headquarters: Thiruvananthapuram, Kerala, India
- Ministers responsible: V.D. Satheesan, Minister for Commercial Taxes and Lotteries; M. Liju, Minister for Excise; O. J. Janeesh, Minister for Registration
- Agency executive: K.R. Jyothilal IAS, Additional Chief Secretary (Finance & Taxes)
- Child agencies: Kerala Excise; Kerala State Lotteries Department; Kerala State GST Department
- Website: Department of Taxes

The Department of Taxes is one of the administrative departments of the Government of Kerala. It is responsible for the formulation and implementation of tax policies, collection of sales taxes, and administration of commercial taxes, excise, and registration laws in Kerala. The Taxes Department is one of the three major revenue-collecting departments of the Government of Kerala.

== Leadership ==
The department is headed by Cabinet Ministers of the Government of Kerala, and the incumbent Minister for Commercial Taxes and Lotteries is V. D. Satheesan, the Minister for Excise is M.Liju, and the Minister for Registration is O. J. Janeesh.

The Taxes department is administratively headed by an Additional Chief Secretary to Government (Taxes), an IAS officer. The current Secretary to Government is K.R. Jyothilal IAS.

The respective line departments are headed by the Commissioner of State GST, the Excise Commissioner, Inspector General of Registration, and the Director of State Lotteries.

Heads of Departments (HODs)
Designation	Incumbent	Ref.
Excise Commissioner	Seeram Sambasiva Rao I.A.S	
State GST Commissioner	P.B. Nooh I.A.S	
Director of State Lotteries	Inbasekar K. I.A.S.	
Inspector General of Registration	Meera.K I.A.S	

== Sub-divisions ==
- Agricultural Income Tax and Sales Tax
  - Department of Commercial Taxes (Commissionarate of State Goods and Services Tax)
  - Goods and Services Tax (GST)
  - Central Excise Tariff Act, 1985
  - Sales Tax both Central and State
- Excise
  - Excise Department
  - Abkari Act
  - Narcotic Drugs and Psychotropic Substance Act (NDPS)
  - Prohibition Act
  - BEVCO
- Kuries and Chitties and Money Lending
  - Kerala State Financial Enterprises Limited
  - Money Lender’s Act
  - Non-banking finance companies
- Lotteries
  - State Lotteries Department
- Registration
  - Registration Department
  - Indian Registation Act
- Stamps
  - Indian Stamps Act
  - Kerala Stamps Act
  - Stamp Depot
- Travancore-Cochin Literary, Scientific and Charitable Societies Registration Act
- Transfer of Property Act

== Functions ==
The department is primarily responsible for the assessment, collection, and enforcement of various state taxes including Goods and Services Tax (State GST), agricultural income tax, luxury tax, and excise duties. It also coordinates with other state and central agencies for effective tax administration and revenue monitoring. The department is responsible for administrative supervision of the line departments.

The Department of Taxes is responsible for the enforcement of the following Acts in the State of Kerala:

- Agricultural Income Tax Act
- Central Excise Tariff Act, 1985
- Abkari Act
- Goods and Services Tax Act
- Narcotic Drugs and Psychotropic Substances Act
- Medicinal and Toilet Preparations (Excise Duties) Act
- Prohibition Act
- Money Lenders Act
- Indian Partnership Act
- Non-Trading Companies Act
- Indian Registration Act
- Indian Stamps Act
- Kerala Stamp Act
- Transfer of Property Act
- Travancore–Cochin Literary, Scientific and Charitable Societies Registration Act

== Sub-departments ==
The following offices and organisations function under the administrative control of the Department of Taxes:

- Kerala State Goods and Services Tax Department
- Kerala Excise Department
- Kerala State Beverages Corporation
- Kerala State Lottery Department
- Registration Department, Kerala

== List of Ministers ==
=== Commercial Taxes, Agricultural Income Tax and Lotteries ===
- K. Sankaranarayanan (2001-2004)
- Vakkom Purushothaman (2004-2006)
- T. M. Thomas Isaac (2006-2011)
- K. M. Mani (2011-2015)
- Oommen Chandy (2015-2016)
- T. M. Thomas Isaac (2016-2021)
- K. N. Balagopal (2021-2026)
- V. D. Satheesan (2026- Incumbent)

=== Registation ===
- T. M. Jacob (18-05-2011 — 30-10-2011)
- Anoop Jacob (2012-2016)
- G. Sudhakaran (2016-2021)
- Kadannappalli Ramachandran (2021-2026)
- O. J. Janeesh (2026- Incumbent)

=== Excise ===
- K. Sankaranarayanan (26-05-2001 - 11-02-2004
- K.V. Thomas (11-02-2004 - 29-08-2004)
- Vakkom .B. Purushothaman
- Babu Divakaran (2004-2006)
- P. K. Gurudasan (2006-2011)
- K. Babu (2011-2016)
- T. P. Ramakrishnan (2016-2021)
- M. V. Govindan (2021-2022)
- M. B. Rajesh (2021-2026)
- M. Liju (2026- Continues)

== See also ==
- Department of Finance (Kerala)
- Department of Revenue (Kerala)
- Government of Kerala
- Economy of Kerala
