= Kerala Excise =

Law enforcement agency for excise and narcotics control in Kerala, India

Kerala Excise കേരള എക്സ്സൈസ്
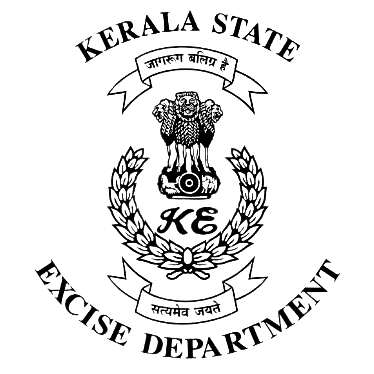
- Abbreviation: K.E
- Motto: ജാഗരൂഗ്, ബലിഗ്രാഹ് "Jagaroog Baligrah" "Astute in actions and devoted to the betterment of the nation" പ്രവര്‍ത്തനങ്ങളില്‍ സൂക്ഷ്മബുദ്ധിയുള്ളതും രാജ്യത്തിന്റെ ഉന്നമനത്തിന് ആത്മാര്‍പ്പണം ചെയ്തതും(Malayalam)

Agency overview
- Formed: November 30, 1998
- Annual budget: ₹566.89 crore (US$61 million)(2026–27, revised)

Jurisdictional structure
- Operations jurisdiction: Kerala, India
- Jurisdiction of Kerala Excise
- Area: 38863 km2 (15005 sq mi)
- Population: 34,630,192
- Legal jurisdiction: State of Kerala

Operational structure
- Overseen by: Kerala Excise Department, Government of Kerala
- Headquarters: Excise Commissionerate, Vikas Bhavan P.O Nandhavanam], Thiruvananthapuram, Kerala – 695033
- Map of Kerala Excise Department's jurisdiction. The map on left shows Kerala in India and on right shows the State with Thiruvananthapuram district in red
- Minister responsible: M. Liju, Minister for Excise and Cooperation, Government of Kerala
- Agency executive: Dr. S. Karthikeyan, IAS, Excise Commissioner
- Parent agency: Taxes Department, Government of Kerala
- Units: List of units: Administration; Enforcement; Excise Crime Records Bureau; Internal Audit Wing; Excise Intelligence & Investigation Bureau(EI&IB); Excise Vigilance; State Excise Academy and Research Centre (SEARC); Canteen Stores Department; KSBC

Website
- https://www.keralaexcise.gov.in/ KeralaExcise

The Kerala State Excise is the law enforcement agency for excise and narcotics in state of Kerala, India. Kerala Excise has its headquarters in Thiruvananthapuram, the state capital, and is headed by the Excise Commissioner. The department administers laws related to liquor, narcotic drugs and psychotropic substances, medicinal preparations containing alcohol and narcotics. The current commissioner of Excise is Dr. S. Karthikeyan IAS. The Excise Commissioner reports to the Excise Minister of Kerala, who serves as the chief executive of the department. The Kerala Excise Academy and Research Centre, Thrissur trains the excise officers and that runs full-term basic courses for Excise Inspectors, Excise Preventive Officers, Civil Excise Officers, Women Civil Excise Officers and Civil Excise Officer Drivers Established under the provisions of the Kerala Abkari Act, 1077 (Act 6 of 1077), the department plays a crucial role in regulating and controlling the production, distribution, and consumption of alcoholic beverages and other intoxicating substances and the enforcement of the NDPS Act within the state of Kerala. It is one of the Government of Kerala's three major revenue-collecting departments.

== Duties ==
The principal duties of the department are protection, augmentation and collection of excise revenue and enforcement of the above acts and various rules made there under. The department prevents leakage of revenue, and exerts effective control on the abuse of liquor and intoxicating drugs. The duties of the department are broadly classified as collection of revenue, enforcement activity to prevent illicit liquor production, sale and trafficking and Campaign against alcoholism. Liquor includes spirits of wine, arrack, spirits, wine, toddy, beer and all liquid consisting of or containing alcohol. Individual has no fundamental right over the manufacture and trade of liquor. Absolute right on liquor is vested with the state. The government formulates Abkari policy of the state every year. The policy formulated by the state government is implemented by the Excise Department.

== Organizational structure ==
The Kerala Excise Department is headed by the Excise Commissioner, an IAS officer holding a position equivalent to that of a Secretary to Government. The Excise Commissioner is assisted by Additional Excise Commissioners in charge of administration and enforcement, as well as the Excise Vigilance Officer, who oversees vigilance functions. The Excise Commissioner reports to the Minister for Excise and the Additional Chief Secretary (Taxes) at the government level. The post was previously held by Indian Police Service (IPS) officers until a Central Administrative Tribunal (CAT) order transferred it to the IAS cadre

Joint Excise Commissioners head the zonal offices and various specialized units of the department, including the Excise Intelligence and Investigation Bureau, Excise Crime Branch, Internal Audit Wing, Awareness Wing, State Excise Academy, and Excise Crime Records Bureau.

For the convenience of administration, the State of Kerala is divided into three zones headed by joint excise commissioners.

- South Zone with headquarters at Thiruvananthapuram
- Central Zone with headquarters at Ernakulam
- North Zone with he quarters at Kozhikode

Fourteen excise divisions come under the above three zones which are coterminous with the 14 revenue districts of the state, headed by deputy excise commissioners. In each division there is an assistant excise commissioner for supervision of enforcement activities. Each division is further divided into excise circles, which are co-terminus to the revenue taluk of the state under the control of circle inspectors of Excise. Each circle comprises one or more excise ranges, which are the micro level unit of the Excise Department and the primary enforcement unit headed by excise inspectors.

=== Hierarchy ===
==== Officers ====
- Excise Commissioner
- Additional Excise Commissioner
- Joint Excise Commissioner
- Deputy Excise Commissioner
- Assistant Excise Commissioner
- Excise Circle Inspector
- Excise Inspector
- Assistant Excise Inspector
- Preventive Officer
- Civil Excise Officer
- Civil Excise Officer Driver

== Ranks and insignia ==
Kerala Excise Department Officers Insignia
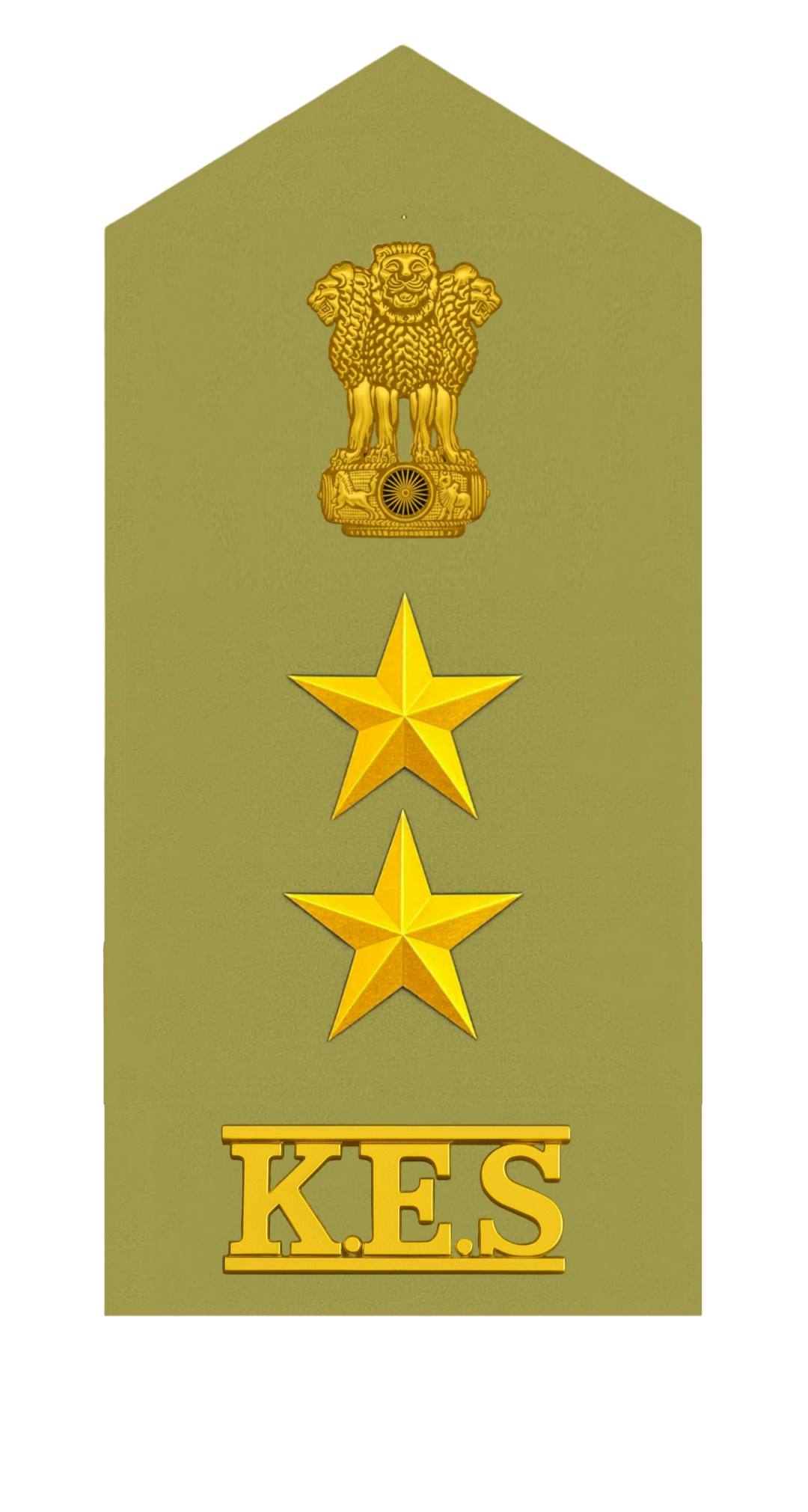
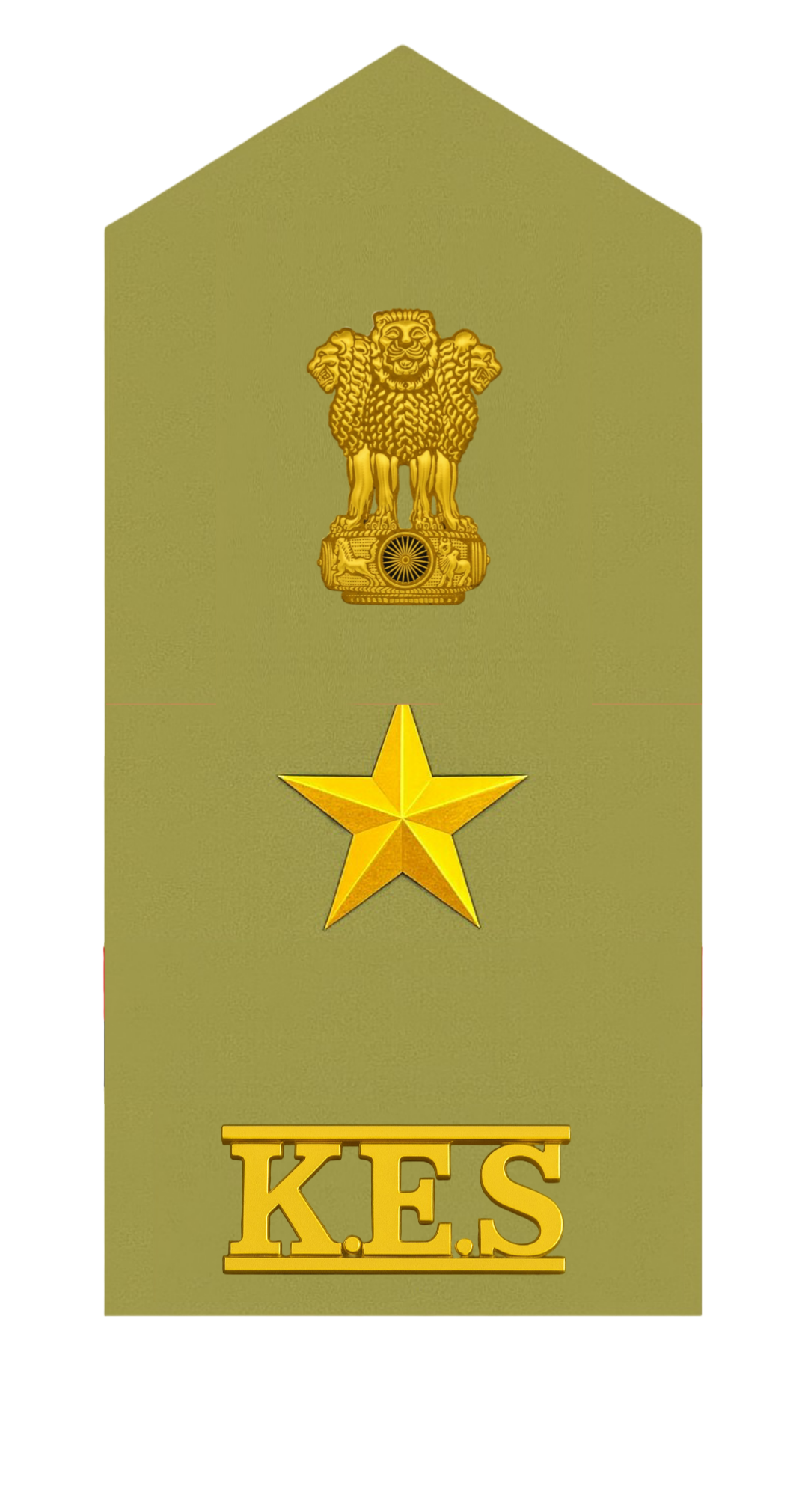
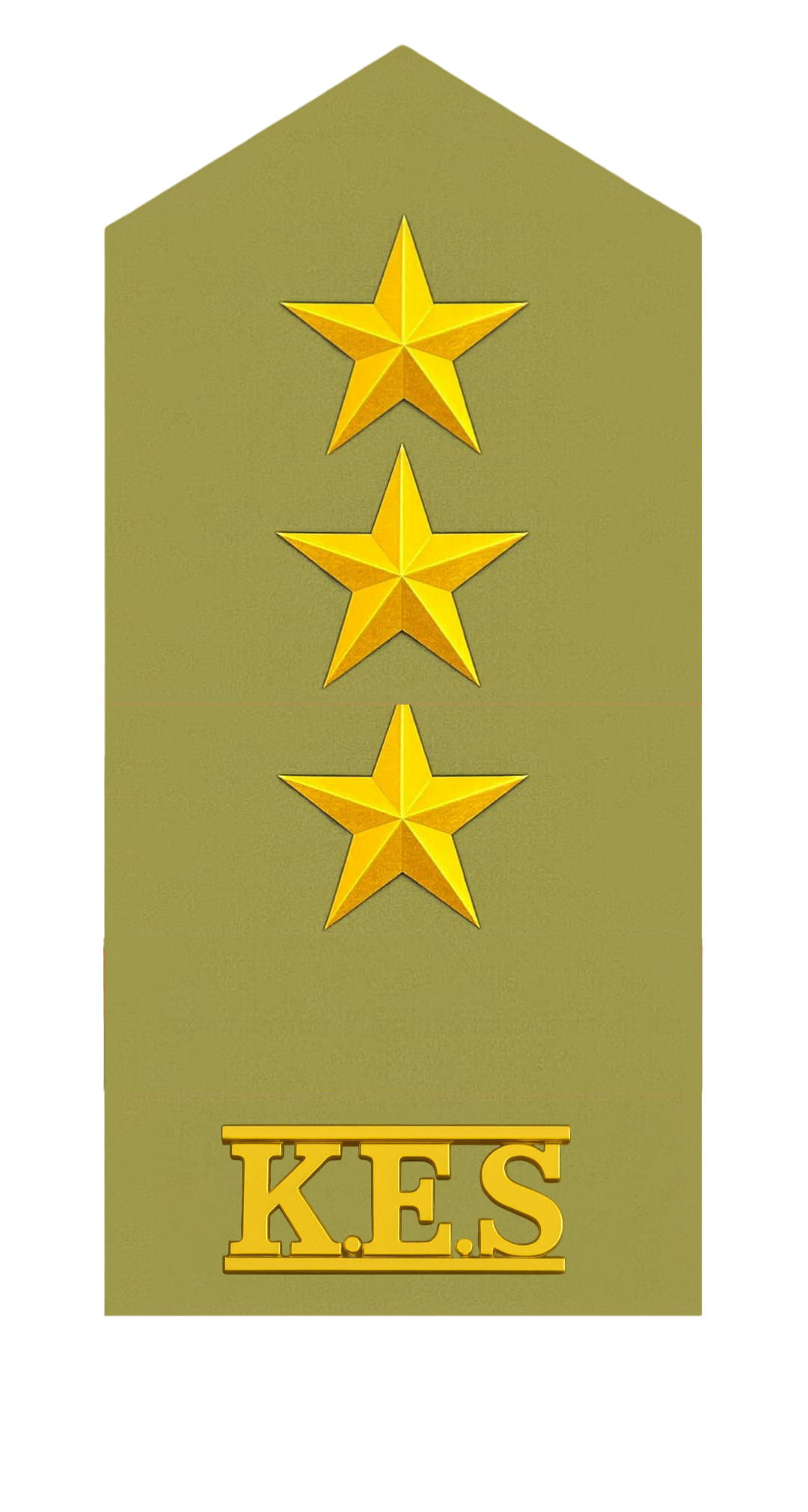
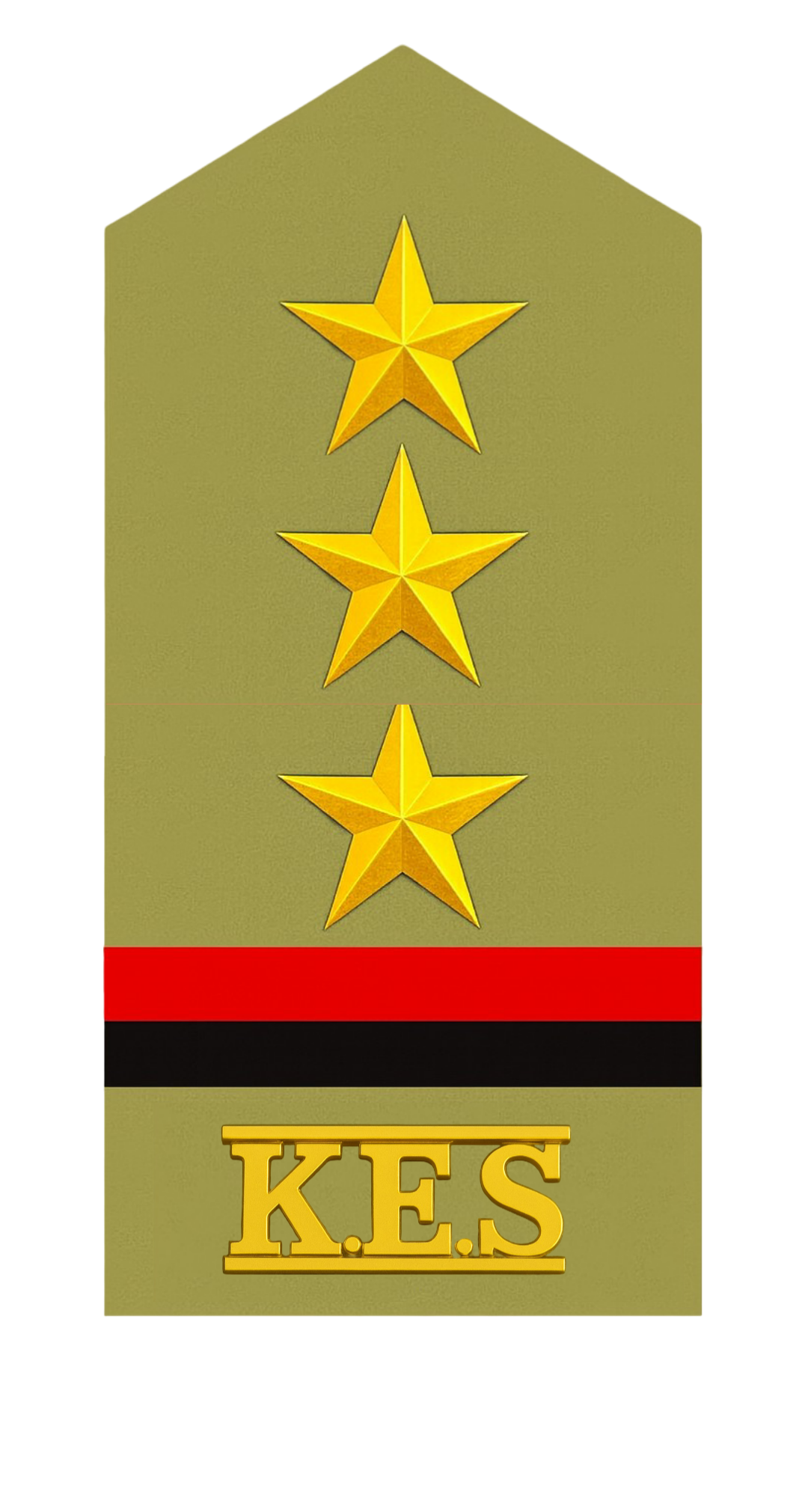
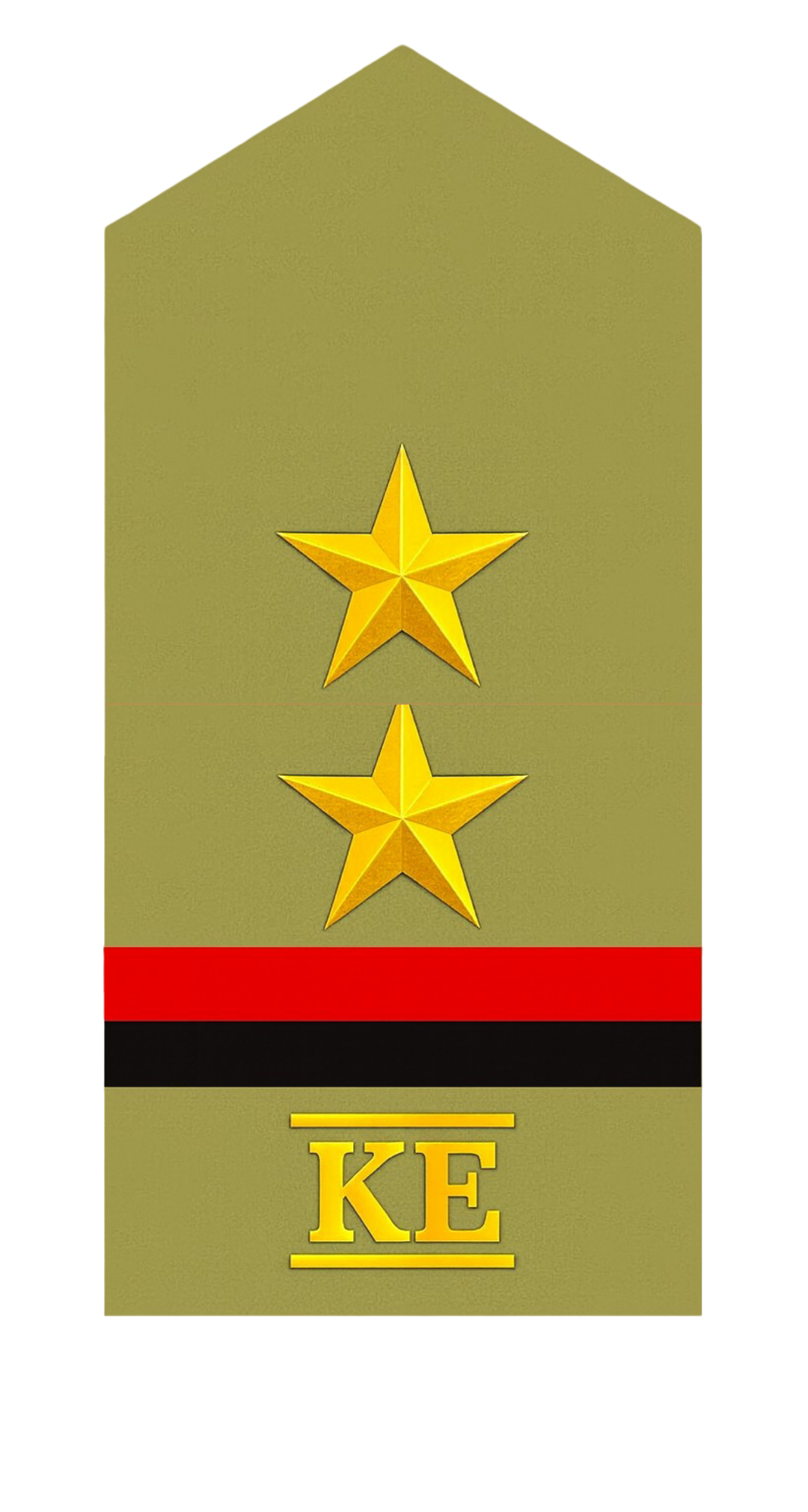
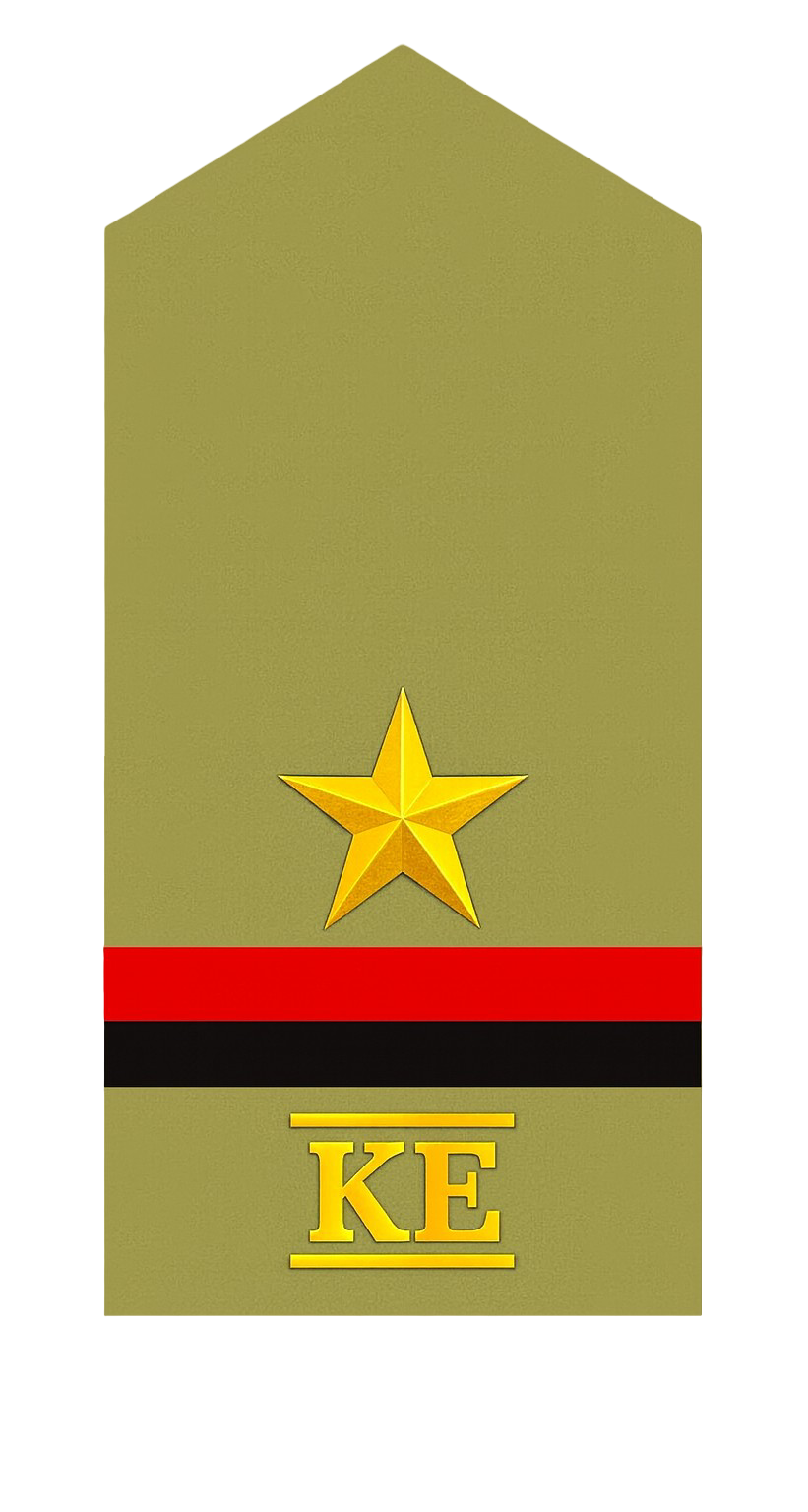
Gazetted Officers
Insignia	No insignia	No insignia
Rank	Excise Commissioner (IAS Ex Cadre)	Additional Excise Commissioner (Ex Cadre)	Joint Excise Commissioner	Deputy Excise Commissioner	Assistant Excise Commissioner	Excise Circle Inspector
Abbreviation	EC	Addl. EC	JEC	DEC	AEC	ECI
Non-Gazetted Officers
Insignia			(Shoulder sleeve) (Sleeve insignia)	No insignia	No insignia
Rank	Excise Inspector	Assistant Excise Inspector	Preventive Officer	Civil Excise Officer	Civil Excise Officer Driver
Abbreviation	EI	AEI	PO	CEO	CEO Dvr

== See also ==
- Kerala Police
- Narcotics Control Bureau (NCB)
- Kerala State Beverages Corporation
