= C. K. Sadasivan =

Indian politician

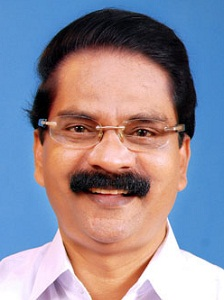

Member of the Kerala Legislative Assembly
- In office 2006 – 2016
- Constituency: Kayamkulam
- Preceded by: M. M. Hassan
- Succeeded by: U. Prathibha

Member of the Kerala Legislative Assembly
- In office 1991 – 1996
- Preceded by: V. Dinakaran
- Succeeded by: Suseela Gopalan
- Constituency: Ambalappuzha

Personal details
- Born: 17 February 1953 (age 73)
- Party: Communist Party of India (Marxist)

C. K. Sadasivan (born 17 February 1953) is an Indian politician and former member of the Kerala Legislative Assembly. He belongs to the Communist Party of India (Marxist). He was elected to the Kerala Legislative Assembly in 1991, 1996 and 2006.
