= Devaswom Museum =

- Location within Kerala Location within India
- Coordinates: 10°35′39″N 76°02′26″E

Devaswom Museum is a museum located at Guruvayur in Thrissur District showcasing rare offerings of devotees to the Guruvayur Temple. The museum exhibits temple materials, antiques, musical instruments, mural paintings, adornments used in folk arts like Krishnanattam and Kathakali, elephant teeth of Guruvayur Keshavan.

== See also ==
Guruvayur Devaswom Institute of Mural Painting
