= U. Prathibha =

Indian politician

Adv Prathibha
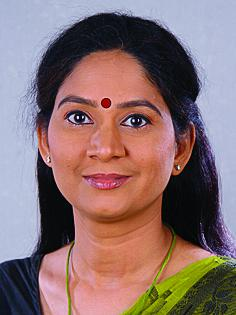

Member of the Kerala Legislative Assembly
- In office 2 June 2016 – 23 May 2026
- Preceded by: C. K. Sadasivan
- Succeeded by: M. Liju
- Constituency: Kayamkulam

Alappuzha District Panchayat President
- In office 2010 – 2015

Thakazhy Grama Panchayat President
- In office 2005 – 2010

Personal details
- Born: 10 May 1978 (age 48)48 Thakazhy, Alappuzha, India
- Party: Communist Party of India (Marxist)
- Spouse: K. R. Hari (m. 2001; div. 2018)
- Children: 1 son (Kanivu)
- Occupation: politician

U. Prathibha is an Indian politician who is a member of Communist Party of India (Marxist) and a former Member of the Legislative Assembly representing the Kayamkulam constituency of Alappuzha district, Kerala.

== Personal life ==
Daughter of Sri. V. K. Purushothaman and Smt. J. Umayamma. Born at Thakazhy on 10 May 1977. She married K.R. Hari a Kerala State Electricity Board employee in 2001 and the couple has a son named Kanivu. In 2018, they have filed for Divorce before court. In 2019, her former husband was found dead by Suicide.

== Political career ==
She came into politics through Students' Federation of India and entered electoral foray through local self-government. She was elected as a member in Thakazhy Grama Panchayat in 2000-2005. She became the President of Thakazhy Grama Panchayat during 2005- 2010. She was the president of Alappuzha District panchayat from 2010- 2015. She was elected to 14th Legislative assembly and 15th Legislative assembly of Kerala from Kayamkulam Constituency in 2016 and got re-elected from there again in 2021.

Kerala Legislative Assembly Election
Year	Constituency	Closest Rival	Majority (Votes)	Won/Loss
2016	Kayamkulam	Adv M Liju (INC)	11857	Won
2021	Kayamkulam	Aritha Babu (INC)	6298	Won

In 2016 Kerala Legislative Assembly election, she defeated Adv. M. Liju of INC, with a majority of 11857 votes and in 2021 Kerala Legislative Assembly election, she won against Aritha Babu of INC with a majority of 6298.

In 2026 Kerala Legislative Assembly election, she lost against Adv. M. Liju of INC, who won with a majority of 15572 votes.

== Controversies ==
In 2013, there was a corruption allegation against her while holding position of District panchayat President over land acquisition for construction of a Gender Park in Alappuzha and Kerala High Court stayed probe in this case. In 2020, during COVID-19 pandemic she caught in midst of a controversy after criticizing Journalists for reporting tussles between her and local Democratic Youth Federation of India workers. In 2024, her son was arrested by Kerala Police alleging possession of Ganja and her stand to support her son became a controversy.
