= M. M. Hassan =

Indian politician

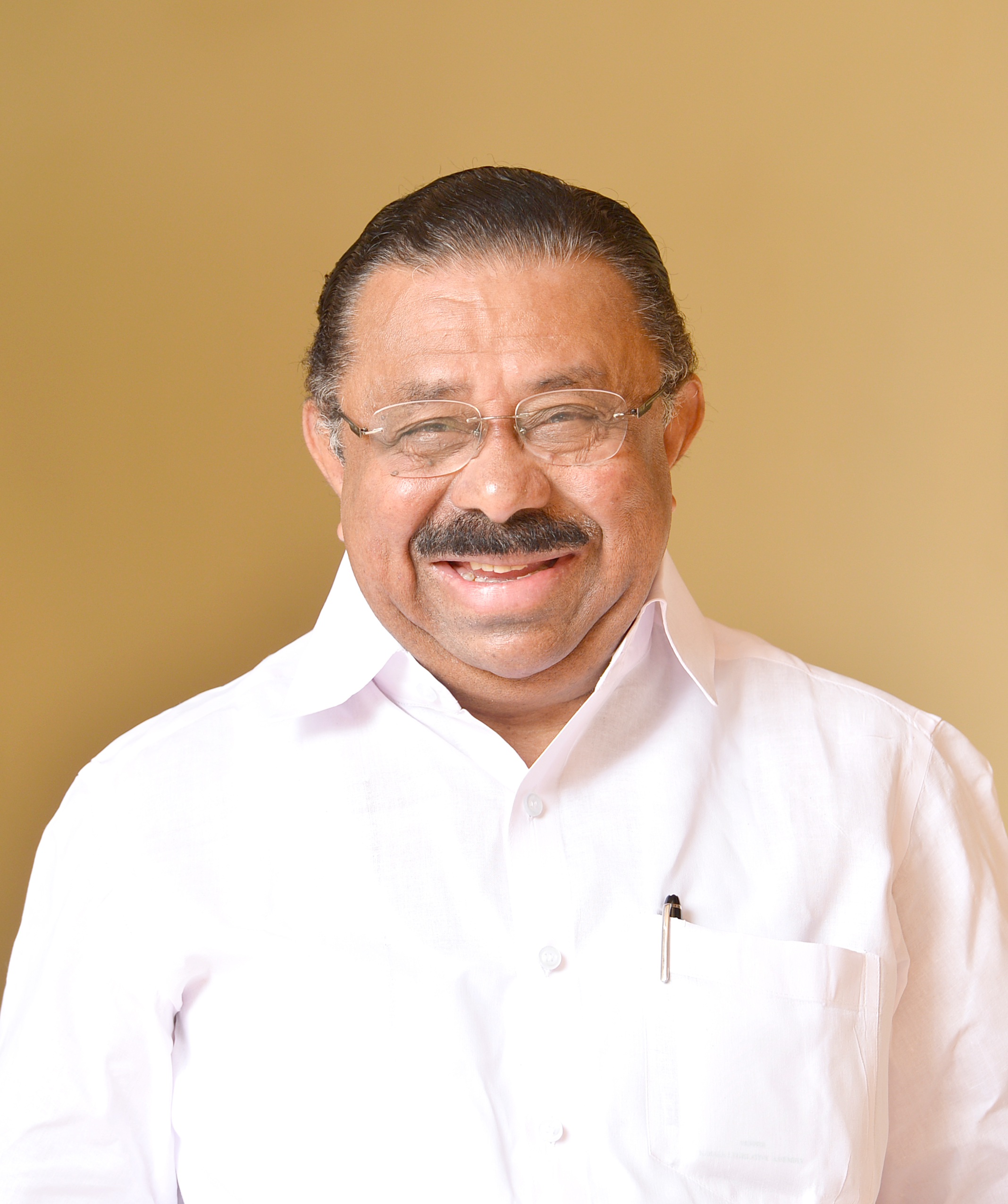
- Former Minister in the Government of Kerala

Kerala Predesh Congress Committee President
- In office 25 March 2017 – 18 September 2018
- Preceded by: V. M. Sudheeran
- Succeeded by: Mullappally Ramachandran

Minister of Kerala Legislative Assembly
- In office 1980–1987
- Preceded by: Kaniapuram Ramachandran Nair
- Succeeded by: Prof. Nabeesa Ummal
- Constituency: Kazhakkoottam
- In office 1987–1996
- Constituency: Trivandrum West
- In office 2001–2006
- Preceded by: G. Sudhakaran
- Succeeded by: C. K. Sadasivan
- Constituency: Kayamkulam

Personal details
- Born: 14 May 1947 (age 79) Thiruvananthapuram, Travancore, British India
- Party: Indian National Congress
- Spouse: Smt. A. K. Rahia
- Children: One daughter
- Parent(s): Shri M. Malik Mohammed and Smt. A. Fathima Beevi
- Education: Bachelor of Laws
- Profession: Advocate

Malik Mohammed Hassan (born 14 May 1947) is a leader of the Indian National Congress, a former Minister in the Government of Kerala and also former president of KPCC . He has served the Kerala Legislative Assembly for over two decades as part of the INC. Being a strong orator and a respected parliamentarian recognised among his peers for his integrity and an inspirational leader accepted by the public, he has always been considered as a true leader who upheld the concept of secularism and nationalism.

Mr. Hassan previously served as the UDF Convenor. He was elected to the Kerala Legislative Assembly 5 times, twice from the Kazhakootam constituency (1980–82 and 1982–87) and twice from Trivandrum West (1987–91 and 1991–96). In 2001-06, he also represented the Kayamkulam constituency in the Kerala Legislative Assembly. He served as the Minister for Information and Parliamentary Affairs in the Ministry headed by A.K. Antony from 2001 to 2004.

Mr. Hassan is notable for his initiatives such as the NORKA Roots started in 2002 and the Janasree Sustainable Development Mission started in 2009. On 25 March 2017 he was elected as the president of the KPCC, and served until 18 September 2018.

Mr. Hassan is also the founding director of Jai Hind TV channel which played a key role in INC communication strategy.

== Biography ==
Hassan was born on 14 May 1947 in Thiruvananthapuram. He was introduced to active politics through the Kerala Students Union (KSU) and became its state president. He was then elected as the senate member and Chairman of the Kerala University Union.

He was elected from the Kazhakootam constituency to the Kerala Legislative Assembly in the 1980 and 1982 elections, and re-elected from Trivandrum West in the 1987 and 1991 general elections. In 2001, he represented the Kayamkulam constituency in the Kerala Legislative Assembly and served as the Minister for Information and Parliamentary Affairs in the Ministry headed by A. K. Antony from 2001 to 2004. He also held the portfolio of Minister for Non-Resident Keralites' Affairs in the Kerala Legislative Assembly.

On 25 March 2017 he became president of the Kerala Pradesh Congress Committee, and served until 18 September 2018.

He is an LLB degree holder.

== Early life and education ==
In his school days, Hassan was one of the most active members of Akhila Kerala BalaJana Sakhyam, one of the biggest Children's organizations in Asia conducted by Malayala Manorama, where he was elected as the ‘League of Petty Officers’. This was the point where Hassan realised his leadership and mentoring abilities and he was able to formulate opinions and views about society. With the confidence that he gained over time and with his innate oratory skills, Hassan became a prominent member of KSU in college and was elected as the Kerala Student Union President and later became the University Union Chairman. In 1969, during EMS ministry, he was elected as a Student Representative to the Senate in Kerala University. That was a first-time in Asia and he was one among the first 3 members. Mr Hassan's integrity and commitment paved the way in becoming the President of KSU and later Youth Congress State Secretary, in a very short span of time. In 1980, after completing his education, he was elected as Kazhakootam Constituency MLA and was also the District Congress President in Trivandrum. Later, in 2017 Mr. Hassan became the KPCC President. Hassan was born on 14 May 1947 in Thiruvananthapuram. He is married to Rahia A.K and has a daughter Nisha Safeer.

=== Positions held ===
UDF Convenor	Oct 2020–2025
KPCC President	Mar 2017- Sept 2018
Chairman	Media Committee, KPCC
Founder & Chairman	Janasree Sustainable Development Mission
Founder & Chairman	Non-Resident Keralites Affairs
Minister For Information, Parliamentary Affairs & Non- Resident Keralites Affairs (NORKA)	2001- 2004, Govt Of Kerala
Chairman of Norka- Roots	2004-2006
Elected To Kerala Legislative Assembly 5 Times	Kazhakootam constituency (1980-1982 and 1982–1987) Trivandrum West (1987-1991 and 1991–1996) Kayamkulam constituency (2001)
General Secretary Kerala Pradesh Congress Committee (KPCC)	1994-2001
Chief Whip Of Opposition Parties	1987-1991
Secretary, Congress Legislature Party, Kerala Legislative Assembly	1991-1996
DCC President	1987 -1991
Chairman Nehru Centre, Trivandrum	1978 onwards
Youth Congress State General Secretary	1975 - 1978
State President – Kerala Students Union	1973
