= Indian Partnership Act, 1932 =

Imperial Legislative Council
- Long title: An Act to define and amend the law relating to partnership.
- Citation: No. 9 of 1932
- Enacted by: Imperial Legislative Council
- Assented to: 8 April 1932
- Commenced: 1 October 1932 except section 69 which came into force on the 1st day of October 1933.

Keywords
- extends to the whole of India
- Status: In force

The Indian Partnership Act, 1932 was enacted in India in 1932.

== Provisions ==
Under section 44(d) of the act, a suit can be filed against the managing partner for dissolution of the partnership firm.

Section 4 of the Indian Partnership Act, 1932 defines Partnership in the following terms:<

"Partnership is the relation between persons who have agreed to share the profits of a business carried on by all or any of them acting for all."

Section 464 of the Companies Act, 2013 empowers the Central Government to prescribe maximum number of partners in a firm but the number of partners so prescribed cannot be more than 50. The Central Government has prescribed the maximum number of partners in a firm to be 50 by rule 10 of the Companies (Miscellaneous) Rules, 2014. Thus, in effect, a partnership firm cannot have more than 50 members.

== General duties of partners ==
The partners shall run the business of the firm to the highest level of common advantage by being true to each other. They have to be accountable to one another and provide complete information of all the aspects of the firm, to any other partner or their legal representatives.

== Duty of indemnification ==
Each partner shall indemnify the firm for any loss that occurred due to fraud, in the conduct of the business.
