= Kareelakulangara =

- Kareelakulangara

- Location in Kerala, India Kareelakulangara (India)
- Coordinates: 9.1934°N 76.4852°E
- PIN: 690572

Kareelakulangara is a small neighbourhood situated in Pathiyoor village of Alappuzha district of Kerala state of India. National Highway NH47 passes through this junction. It is situated 4 km (2.5 mi) from Kayamkulam town towards Eranakulam and 10 km (6.2 mi) from Harippad town towards Thiruvananthapuram.
