= M. Liju =

Indian politician

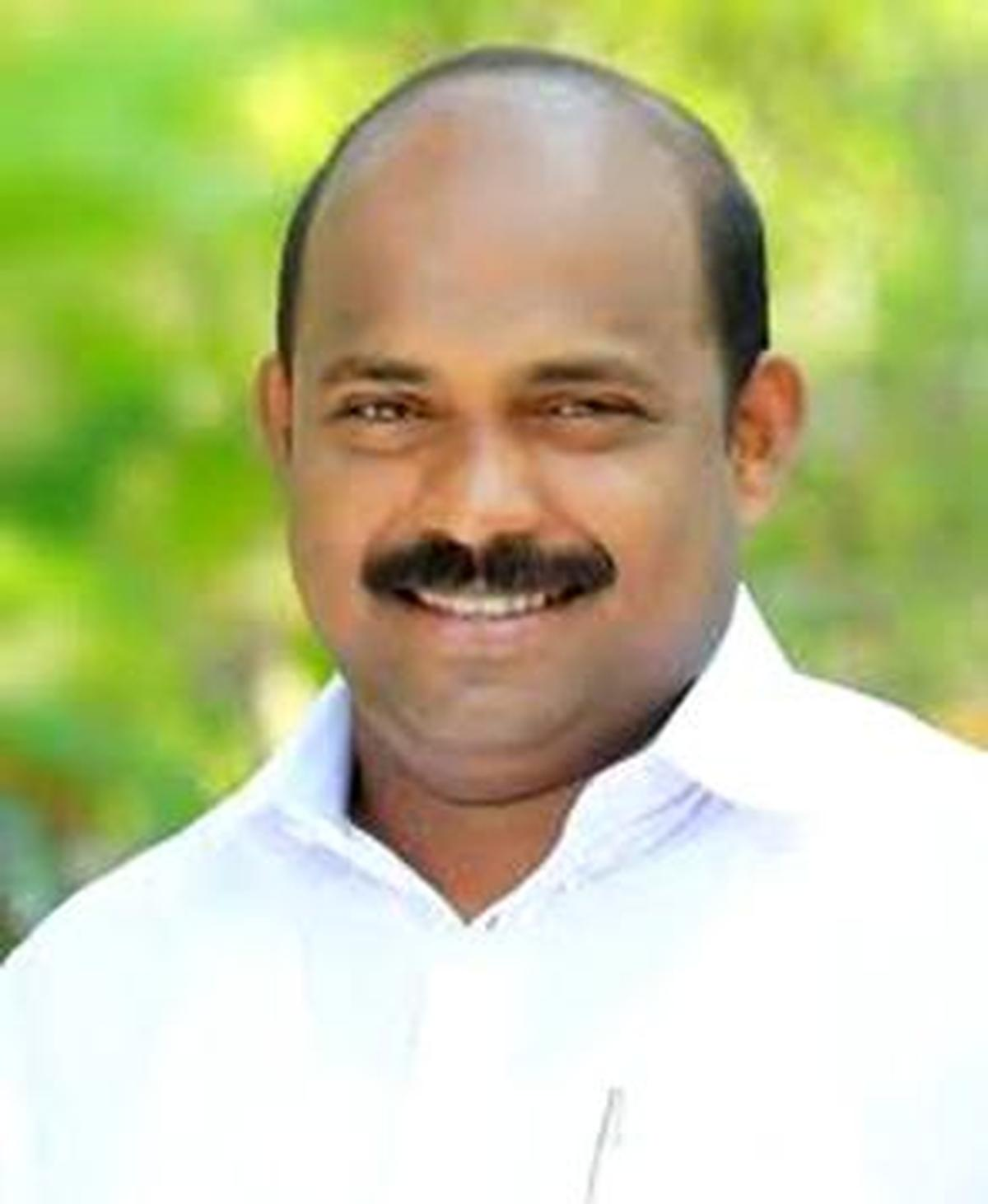

Minister for Excise and Cooperation, Government of Kerala
- Incumbent
- Assumed office 18 May 2026
- Governor: Rajendra Arlekar
- Chief Minister: V.D. Satheesan
- Departments: Excise; Cooperation
- Preceded by: M. B. Rajesh (Excise); V. N. Vasavan (Co-operation)

Member of the Kerala Legislative Assembly
- Incumbent
- Assumed office 18 May 2026
- Preceded by: U. Prathibha

Personal details
- Born: Haripad, Alappuzha, Kerala, India
- Party: Indian National Congress
- Parent: Mohanlal M.
- Education: Bachelor of Science; Bachelor of Laws; Master of Laws
- Alma mater: Government Law College, Thiruvananthapuram; Kuvempu University
- Occupation: Politician; Social worker; Lawyer

M. Liju is an Indian politician, lawyer and social worker and a member of the Indian National Congress, who is currently serving as the Minister for Excise and Co-operation in the Government of Kerala.He was elected as a member of the Kerala Legislative Assembly representing the Kayamkulam constituency in the 2026 Kerala Legislative Assembly election. He had also served as the State President of Indian Youth Congress in Kerala, President of the Alappuzha District Congress Committee and General Secretary of Kerala Pradesh Congress Committee. Currently, he is the Vice President of Kerala Pradesh Congress Committee.
