= Institute of Mural Painting =

Institute in Kerala

Institute of Mural Painting is an institute established by Guruvayur Devaswom Board in 1989 to give training in mural painting, especially in the Kerala style of mural painting, in the traditional Gurukula system. Guruvayur Devaswom Board is the statutory body which governs and manages a group of 12 temples including the Sri Krishna Temple at Guruvayur. This is the only institute of its kind in India.

The institute offers a five-year National Diploma Course in mural painting. The trainees get instruction in Fine Arts for the first two years and specialized training in Kerala mural painting in the remaining three years. At the end of the second and fifth years, there are public examinations conducted by the Commissioner for Government Examinations, Government of Kerala. The topics examined include Drawing, Design, Painting and History of Arts & Aesthetics, and Materials & Methods. Each year ten new students are admitted based on an aptitude test and an interview and the admitted students are given scholarships, free accommodation and mess facilities.

== History ==
Guruvayur Sri Krishna Temple suffered a fire accident on 30 November 1970 and the fire damaged the sanctum sanctorum of the temple. The walls of the sanctum sanctorum had been adorning historic mural painting and these paintings were also severely damaged in the fire. As part of the renovation work, the temple management wanted to restore these mural paintings to their original glory. There were only a few experts to take up the challenge and they did a commendable job of restoring the mural paintings by the time the renovation was completed. After the completion of the restoration work, these few experts in mural painting and the temple management authorities deliberated on establishing a centre for giving training in this art. The result was the establishment of the Institute of Mural Painting in 1989. Mammiyur Krishnankutty Nair, who was among the few experts involved in the restoration work, was appointed as the first Principal of the institute. After his death, M. K. Sreenivasan succeeded him. K. U. Krishnakumar is the current Principal and Chief Instructor of the Institute.
