= Pathiyoor =

- village
- Location in Kerala, India Pathiyoor (India)
- Coordinates: 9°12′0″N 76°30′0″E
- Country: India
- State: Kerala
- District: Alappuzha

Population (2011)
  - Total: 23,460

Languages
  - Official: Malayalam, English
- Time zone: UTC+5:30 (IST)
- Vehicle registration: KL 29

Pathiyoor is a village in Kayamkulam city in the Indian state of Kerala.The village will be northern part of this city.

== Notable people ==
- Thachadi Prabhakaran, Indian politician പത്തിയൂർ കമലം :- തകിൽ

== Demographics ==
At the 2011 India census, Pathiyoor (Village) had a population of 23,460 with 10,939 males and 12,521 females.

== See also ==
- Kareelakulangara, a neighbourhood south west of Pathiyoor
