= Kandalloor =

- village
- Location in Kerala, India Kandalloor (India)
- Coordinates: 9°10′0″N 76°28′0″E
- Country: India
- State: Kerala
- District: Alappuzha

Population (2011)
  - Total: 19,925

Languages
  - Official: Malayalam, English
- Time zone: UTC+5:30 (IST)

Kandalloor is a village in Alappuzha district in the Indian state of Kerala.

== Etymology ==
The village got the name from the combination of two words - 'Kandal' and 'Oor'. 'Kandal' means mangrove forest which was once abundant in these region with its biodiversity of various flora and fauna. In Tamil language, 'oor' means place or village. Tamil was spoken throughout Kerala, once.

== History ==
Not much is known about the ancient history of Kandalloor. Like any other mangrove forest region, the land was obviously marshy and was covered with thick mangrove plantations and plenty of inland water bodies with isolated landmasses. The fast disappearing 'kavu' (small bushy thick forest) and ponds and other water bodies are the remnants of this ancient geography of the region. Kandalloor village became part of 'Kayamkulam kingdom' which was later annexed to 'Travancore kingdom' during the reign of king 'Marthanda Varma'

== Geography ==
The southern tip of Kandalloor is covered in three sides by Kayamkulam backwater. Being a mangrove forest, biodiversity thrived in the region- varieties of fishes, plants, animals, birds. Animals such as Otter, water snakes, varieties of frogs, and mongoose were plenty. It might have taken a long time to start the settlement in ancient Kandalloor because of scarcity of fresh water, land unsuitable for agriculture, non-navigable land covered with thick forest, plenty of insects and poisonous creatures, etc.

== Demographics ==
As of 2011 India census, Kandalloor had a population of 19925 with 9068 males and 10857 females.

Perhaps, the "Mukkuvan" (fishermen) community and some tribal communities like "Ulladan" were the early settlers. A big population of 'Mukkuvan' community still live in the western bank of Kayamkulam backwater ('Kayal' in local language). However, "Ulladan" are almost absent in the village, presently. Next major settlement might have started by people migrating from north towards south clearing the forest changing the land shapes to make it inhabitable. Ezhava community, who are present majority in the village have played a major role in changing the landscape and starting the agriculture in the region. During the medieval era, most of the land came under the control of temple ("Devswam") and slowly the land came under powerful 'Nayar' community, the land load community in the region. Nayar community might have occupied the region already, but their power got legalized during this era.

== Waterways ==
A famous water way, which was famous during medieval era, connecting two major sea ports in Kerala - Kollam and Alappuzha - passes over the western boundary of Kandalloor village.

== See also ==
Kareelakulangara, a neighbourhood to the east of Kandalloor
