= Liberation Struggle (Kerala) =

Anti-communist protest against Namboodiripad ministry

- Date: 1958–59
- Location: Kerala
- Caused by: Policies of the Communist Ministry: Educational Bill, 1957; Agrarian Relations Bill, 1957
- Result: Fall of the Communist Ministry: President's Rule; Assembly Elections

Parties
Communist Party of India Government in Kerala: Communist Party of India	Nair Service Society; Syro-Malabar Church; Indian National Congress; Praja Socialist Party; Indian Union Muslim League

Lead figures
Politicians: E. M. S. Namboodiripad; Joseph Mundassery; K. R. Gouri	Mannathu Padmanabha Pillai; P. T. Chacko; Pattom A. Thanu Pillai; Abdurrahiman Bafaki Tangal

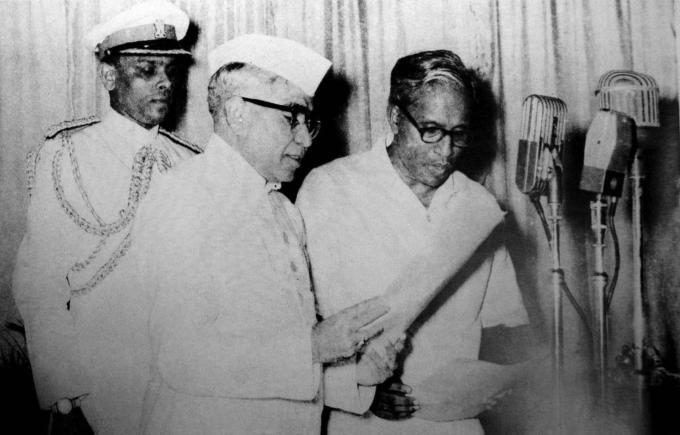
E. M. S. Namboodiripad swearing in as the Chief Minister of Kerala

The Liberation Struggle in Kerala (1958–59) or Vimochana Samaram was a period of anti-communist protest against the first elected state government in Kerala, led by E. M. S. Namboodiripad of the Communist Party of India. Organised opposition to the government was primarily driven by the Syro-Malabar Church, the Nair Service Society, the Indian Union Muslim League, the Praja Socialist Party, and the Indian National Congress. In the aftermath of the struggle, at least 15 people, mostly Christians, including a pregnant woman, died in various incidents of police firing. These events led the Indian central government, under Prime Minister Jawaharlal Nehru, to impose President's Rule and dismiss the state government.

== Background ==
On 1 November 1956, the state of Kerala was formed through the States Reorganisation Act merging most of the Malabar District in the Madras state, the majority of the Travancore-Cochin state, and the Kasargod taluk of South Kanara. In 1957, the first elections for the newly formed Kerala Legislative Assembly were held, resulting in the formation of a government led by the Communist Party of India under the leadership of E. M. S. Namboodiripad.

Assembly Elections, 1957
	Seats Won	Percentage of Polled Votes
Communist Party of India	60	35.28%
Indian National Congress	43	37.85%
Praja Socialist Party	9	10.76%
Revolutionary Socialist Party	0	3.23%
Ind.	14	12.88%
Total	126	

Source: Kerala Government

Minister	Ministry/Portfolio	Party
E. M. S. Namboodiripad	Chief Minister	Communist Party of India
C. Achutha Menon	Minister for Finance	Communist Party of India
K. P. Gopalan	Minister for Industries	Communist Party of India
K. R. Gowri	Minister for Land Revenue	Communist Party of India
Joseph Mundassery	Minister for Education and Cooperation	Communist Party of India
T. V. Thomas	Minister for Labour and Transport	Communist Party of India
P. K. Chathan	Minister for Local Self Government	Communist Party of India
T. A. Majeed	Minister for Public Works	Communist Party of India
K. C. George	Minister for Food and Forests	Communist Party of India
V. R. Krishna Iyer	Minister for Law	Independent
A. R. Menon	Minister for Health	Independent

=== Education Bill, 1957 ===
Source: Government of Kerala

The Education Bill, 1957, was introduced in the Assembly by the Minister for Education, Joseph Mundassery. The bill sought to regulate government grant-aided educational institutions in Kerala. It was introduced in July 1957, passed in September 1957, returned by the President for reconsideration, and finally passed again in November 1958. The bill became law in January 1959.

The bill primarily aimed to:

- Set standard norms for teacher recruitment in grant-aided institutions.
  - Grant the state the right to approve minimum teacher qualifications.
  - Ensure that managements could appoint teachers only from a government-approved list.
  - Mandate that teacher appointments follow a system of communal rotation.
- Prescribe salaries for teachers, with payments made directly from the state treasury.
- Limit the powers of management to dismiss teachers arbitrarily.
- Empower the state to take over institutions that did not comply with the provisions of the bill.

=== Agrarian Relations Bill, 1957 ===
Source: Government of Kerala Agrarian Relations Bill

The Agrarian Relations Bill, 1957, was introduced in the Kerala Assembly by the Minister for Land Revenue, K. R. Gouri, in December 1957 and was passed in June 1959.

The bill primarily aimed to:

- Provide security of tenure to cultivating peasants (tenants).
  - Grant tenants the right to purchase the land they cultivated from landlords.
- Restrict the eviction powers of landlords to protect hut dwellers.
  - Declare all evictions made after the formation of Kerala as illegal.
- Establish procedures for determining fair rent and waiving arrears.
- Fix a ceiling on land ownership, limiting a family to 15 acres of double-crop paddy land for a family of five.
  - Acquire excess land with compensation to the original owners.
  - Redistribute the excess land collected through this process.
- Establish Land Tribunals in every taluk of Kerala to oversee implementation.

== Interest groups ==
Several clauses in the newly introduced bills became controversial as they offended influential interest groups, including the Catholic Church of Kerala, the Muslim League, and Hindu caste organisations such as the Nair Service Society.

=== Political parties ===
In addition to socio-religious organisations, all major opposition parties, including the Indian National Congress, the Praja Socialist Party (PSP), the Muslim League, the Revolutionary Socialist Party, and the Kerala Socialist Party, rallied together demanding the dismissal of the E. M. S. Namboodiripad ministry. These parties formed a joint steering committee with R. Sankar as the president and P. T. Chacko, Pullolil, Kumbalathu Sanku Pillai, Mathai Manjooran, Fr. Joseph Vadakkan, B. Wellington, N. Sreekantan Nair, C. H. Muhammed Koya, and Bafaqi Thangal among its members.

=== Syrian Christians ===
A significant proportion of the schools in Kerala were owned by Syrian Christian churches. They viewed many of the government's reformist policies as infringements on their rights and used newspapers and other publications, such as Deepika and Malayala Manorama, to propagate alarming messages against the controversial policies. Leveraging their political influence at the Centre, Christian groups attempted to derail the government's educational reforms. The Education Bill was referred to the Supreme Court by the President of India, and on 17 May 1958, the Court reported that certain clauses of the bill infringed upon the constitutional rights of minorities. However, after the bill was revised, the government secured presidential assent on 19 February 1959.

Despite these revisions, the disagreement deepened, and Church representatives sought the support of the NSS to oppose the government. Following the Angamaly police firing on 13 June 1959, in which seven of its members were killed, the Catholic Church and other Syrian Christian churches actively participated in the struggle, mobilising massive public support.

=== Nair Service Society (NSS) ===
The Nair Service Society (NSS), a community welfare organisation representing the Nair community, was a major opponent of the government’s land reform policies, which they perceived as radical and prejudiced against the Nair community. In December 1958, the NSS allied with the Catholic Church to form an anti-communist front. Recognising the potential threat posed by this alliance, the government partially retracted some of its policies and indicated a willingness to make concessions.

However, the founder and leader of the NSS, Mannathu Padmanabhan, declared that the aim extended beyond addressing specific grievances and was directed towards the removal of the Communist Party from power. He called upon all NSS field units to mobilise the people and urged the closure of educational institutions as part of the protest.

=== Alleged CIA role ===
The Communist Party alleged that the Central Intelligence Agency (CIA) of the United States was involved in orchestrating the Liberation Struggle.

This claim is supported by Daniel Patrick Moynihan, the American ambassador to India (1973–75), in his 1978 book, A Dangerous Place. His statements are corroborated by Howard Schaffer, the biographer of Ellsworth Bunker, the American ambassador to India (1956–61), who confirmed American involvement in funding the agitation against E. M. S. Namboodiripad’s communist government to prevent the emergence of "additional Keralas".

== Agitations and reprisals ==
A revolt against the Communist government's educational policies began to take shape. At Angamaly, a prime centre of the Christian community,, the intensity of public anger erupted into open violence. The Communist Party government claimed that the police were compelled to open fire on what they alleged was a violent mob attempting to attack a police station. The police firing, which resulted in the death of seven people, is believed to have instigated a mass movement against the E. M. S. Namboodiripad government.

Rallies and demonstrations against the government took place across the state. The protests were led by the Indian National Congress, the ruling party at the Centre (Union Government), and were later supported by various religious and communal groups. The Communists strongly believed that the Central Intelligence Agency (CIA) discreetly supported these protests, both financially and otherwise. The death of Flory, a pregnant Christian fisherwoman, in the police firing further aggravated the situation.

A notable feature of the movement was the active participation of school and college students. The Kerala Students Union, the student wing of the Indian National Congress, also played a significant role in mobilising support for the agitation.

== Results ==
On June 22, 1959, Prime Minister Jawaharlal Nehru had a meeting with EMS, and others. Nehru made the visit to personally examine the collapse of the state's law and order after the "liberation struggle" (vimochansamaram) against the EMS government. The movement was led by Christian churches and Hindu caste organisations such as the Nair Service Society (NSS) headed by Mannathu Padmanabha Pillai. The movement saw widespread violence and counter-violence. All along the Nehru's route from the airport to the Raj Bhavan, crowds demanded EMS ministry’s dismissal by the centre. Nehru asked EMS, "How could you make so many enemies in such a short time?" Upon Nehru's return to Delhi, EMS government was dismissed on July 31. Initially, Nehru was hesitant to dismiss a democratically elected government, but he was convinced by Congress President and his daughter, Indira Gandhi.

The Union Government dismissed the Kerala Ministry on 31 July 1959 and imposed President's Rule, which lasted from 31 July 1959 to 22 February 1960. In the 1960 Assembly Elections, the Indian National Congress-led coalition secured a majority, with the Congress winning 63 seats, while the Communist Party of India secured only 29 seats.

The new Government of Kerala amended the controversial provisions of the Education Act, restoring the authority of grant-aided institution managers to appoint teachers. The Agrarian Relations Act, which had been sent back by the President for reconsideration, was amended and passed by the Kerala Assembly in October 1960 but was subsequently declared unconstitutional by the High Court. The Assembly later passed the more moderate Kerala Land Reforms Act of 1963, which came into force in 1964.
