= 1957 Kerala Legislative Assembly election =

- 28 February – 11 March 1957

All 126 seats in the Kerala Legislative Assembly 64 seats needed for a majority
- Turnout: 65.49%
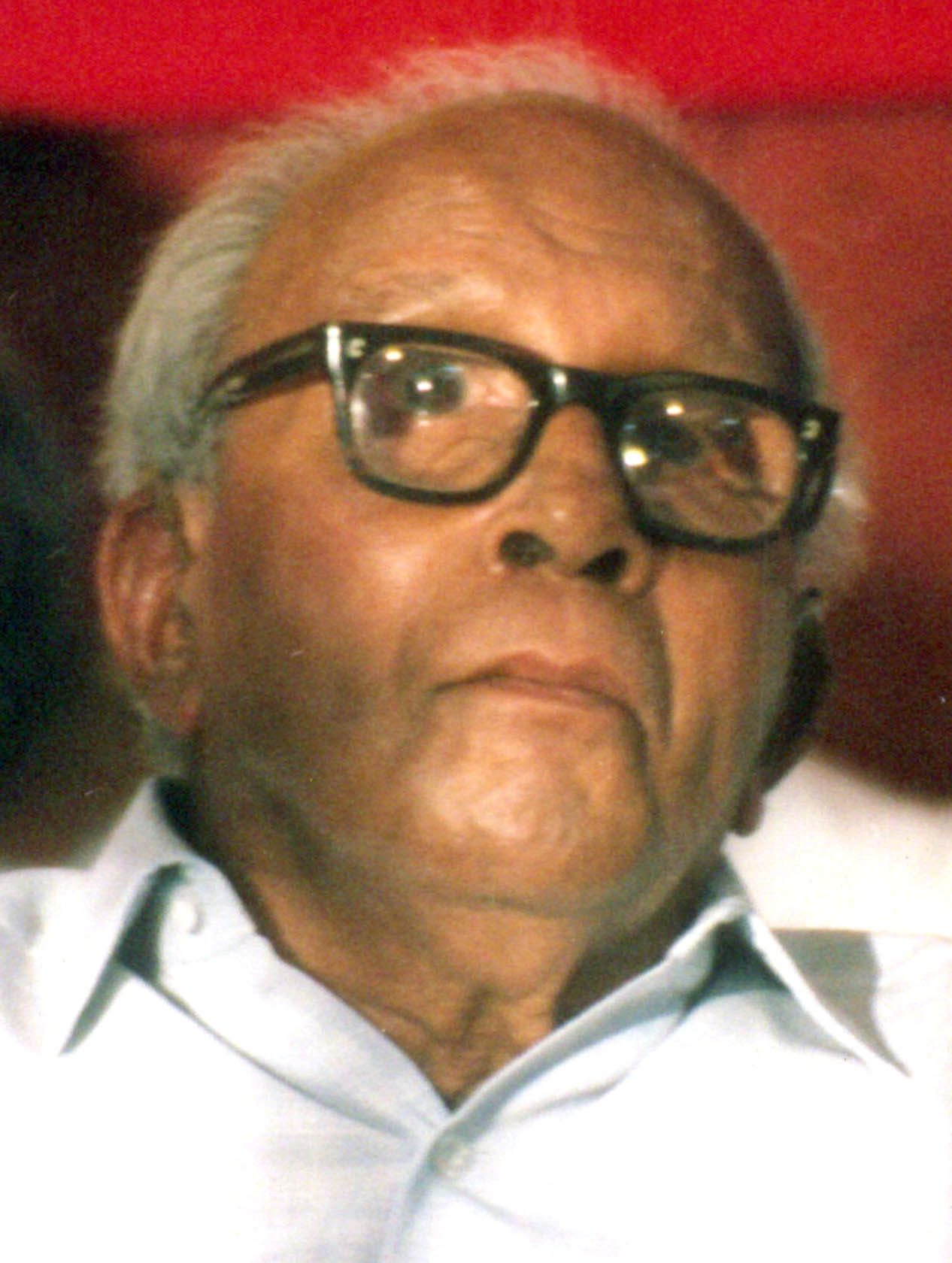

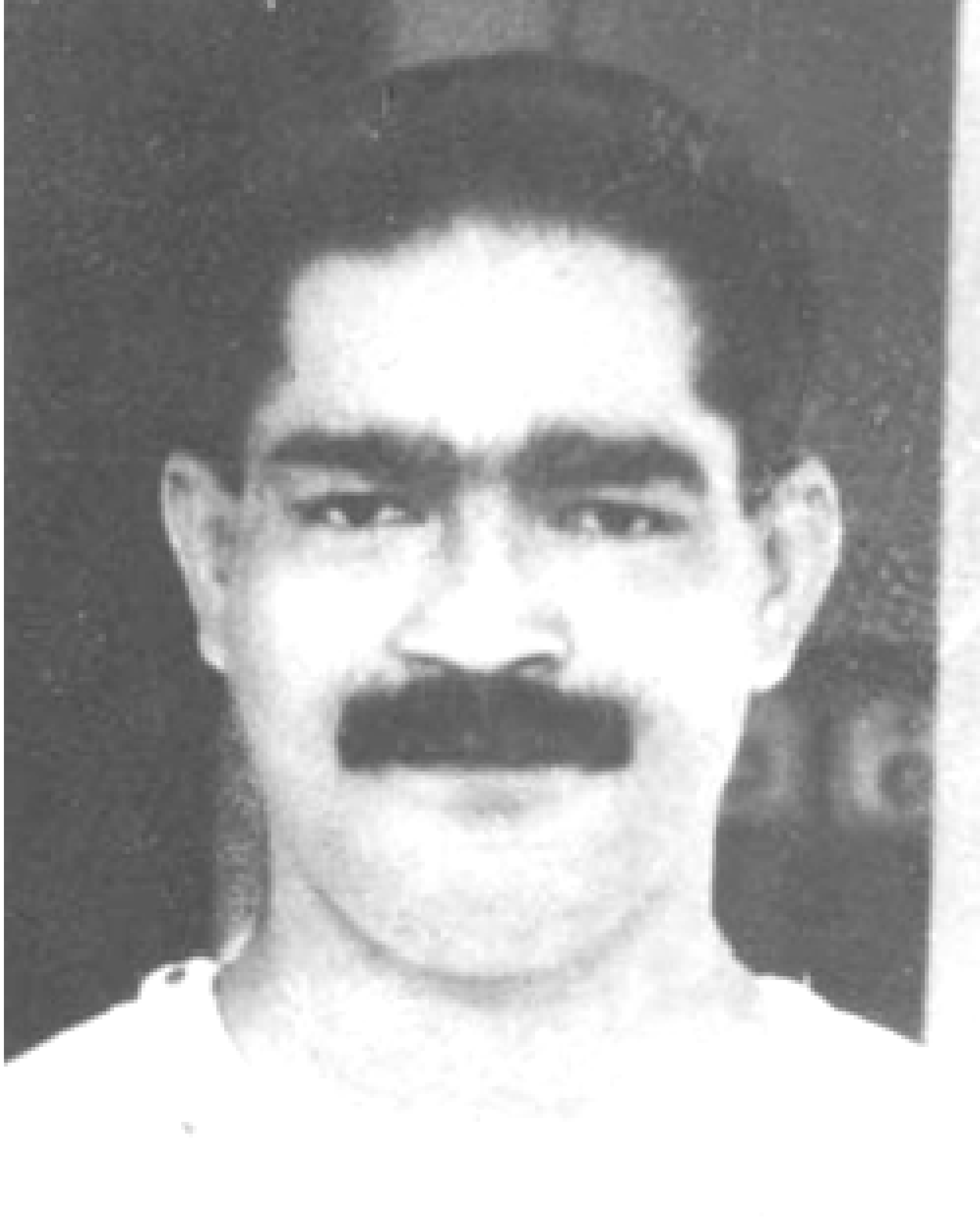
	First party	Second party
Leader	E. M. S. Namboodiripad	P. T. Chacko
Party	CPI	INC
Leader's seat	Nileshwaram Assembly constituency	Vazhoor Assembly constituency
Seats won	60	43
Popular vote	20,59,547	22,09,251
Percentage	35.28%	37.85%
Chief Minister before election
Position established
Elected Chief Minister
E. M. S. Namboodiripad
CPI

The Kerala Legislative Assembly election of 1957 was the first assembly election in the Indian state of Kerala. The Communist Party of India won the election with 60 seats. The election led to the formation of first democratically elected communist government in India. The election also made Kerala as the first state to elect a Non-Congress party in the country.

== State reorganisation ==
On 1 November 1956, under the States Reorganisation Act, 1956, Kerala was formed by the merger of Travancore-Cochin state with the Malabar district (including Fort Cochin and the Laccadive Islands) of Madras State, Kasaragod taluk of the South Canara district and the Amindive Islands. The southern part of Travancore-Cochin, the five taluks of Agastheeswaram, Thovala, Kalkulam, Vilavahcode, and Shencotta, were transferred from Travancore-Cochin to the Madras State. After the reorganization, the assembly constituencies increased from 106 with 117 seats in 1954 to 114 with 126 seats in 1957.

== Background ==
Following the States Reorganisation Act, 1956, the Malabar District of Madras state merged with Travancore-Cochin to form the new state of Kerala on 1 November 1956. The merger helped the Communist Party of India to increase their base in the region. The ruling Indian National Congress lost the prominence due to the factionalism within the party. Furthermore, communalism and struggles against feudalism played a major role.

== Election ==
The Election Commission of India conducted elections to the newly created state between 28 February – 11 March 1957. The elections were held to the 126 seats (114 constituencies) including 12 two member constituencies of which 11 and one reserved for Scheduled Castes and Scheduled Tribes respectively, in which 406 candidates were contested. The voter turnout was 65.49%.

== Results ==
The result of the elections listed below:

Summary of results of the 1957 Kerala Legislative Assembly election
Party	Flag	Seats Contested	Won	% of Seats	Votes	Vote %	Vote % in contested seats
Communist Party of India		101	60	47.62	2,059,547	35.28	40.57
Indian National Congress	INC Flag Official	124	43	34.13	2,209,251	37.85	38.1
Praja Socialist Party		65	9	7.14	628,261	10.76	17.48
Revolutionary Socialist Party		28	0		188,553	3.23	11.12
Independent politician		86	14	11.11	751,965	12.88	N/A
	Total seats	126	Voters	89,13,247	Turnout	58,37,577 (65.49%)	

In the election, five women candidates were elected out of nine candidates.

=== By Constituency ===
Assembly Constituency			Winner			Runner		
No.	Constituency Name	Category	Name	Party	Vote	Name	Party	Vote
1	Parassala	GEN	M. Kunjukrishnan Nadar	INC	16,742	Krishna Pillai K	PSP	8,338
2	Neyyattinkara	GEN	Janardhanan Nair O.	CPI	18,812	Krishna Pillai N. K.	PSP	16,558
3	Vilappil	GEN	Ponnara Sreedhar	PSP	18,221	Surendranath K. V.	CPI	14,278
4	Nemom	GEN	Sadasivan A.	CPI	15,998	Viswambharan P.	PSP	14,159
5	Trivandrum I	GEN	Eapan E. P.	PSP	15,466	Krishnan Nair K.	Independent	13,418
6	Trivandrum II	GEN	Pattom A. Thanu Pillai	PSP	21,816	Anirudhan K.	CPI	17,082
7	Ullur	GEN	Sreedharan V.	CPI	16,904	Alikunju Sastri M.	PSP	14,182
8	Arianad	GEN	Balakrishna Pillai R.	CPI	16,728	Kesavan Nair R.	INC	6,987
9	Nedumangad	GEN	Neelakantaru Pandarathil. N	CPI	20,553	Somasekharan Nair K	PSP	7,888
10	Attingal	GEN	Prakasam R.	CPI	24,328	Gopala Pillai	PSP	11,151
11	Varkala	(SC)	T. A. Majeed	CPI	41,683	Sivadasan K.	CPI	31,454
12	Eravipuram	GEN	Raveendran	CPI	19,122	Kunju Sankara Pillai V.	PSP	8,762
13	Quilon	GEN	A. A. Rahim	INC	20,367	Divakaran T. K	RSP	12,571
14	Thrikkadavur	(SC)	Karunakaran K.	CPI	33,782	T. Krishnan	INC	32,596
15	Karunagappally	GEN	Kunjukrishnan P.	INC	13,709	P. K. Kunju	PSP	13,063
16	Krishnapuram	GEN	Karthikeyan G.	CPI	23,963	Sekhara Panicker K.	INC	14,493
17	Kayamkulam	GEN	Aysha Bai K. O.	CPI	27,067	Sarojini	INC	13,138
18	Karthigapally	GEN	Sugathan R.	CPI	20,978	Velu Pillai G.	INC	14,887
19	Haripad	GEN	Ramakrishna Pillai V.	Independent	20,184	K. Balagangadharan	INC	15,812
20	Mavelikara	GEN	Kunjachan P. K.	CPI	44,630	K. C. George	CPI	39,617
21	Kunnathur	(GEN)	Madhavan Pillai P. R.	CPI	41,569	Govindan R.	CPI	37,321
22	Kottarakkara	(SC)	E. Chandrasekharan Nair	CPI	23,298	Ramachandran Nair K.	INC	14,307
23	Chadayamangalam	GEN	Bhargavan K.	CPI	19,375	Abdul Majeed M.	PSP	9,143
24	Pathanapuram	GEN	Rajagopalan Nair	CPI	24,499	Kuttan Pillai K.	INC	14,440
25	Punalur	GEN	Gopalan P.	CPI	20,455	Kunjuraman Assan K.	INC	16,366
26	Ranni	GEN	Idicula	INC	23,308	Thomas Mathew	Independent	20,722
27	Pathanamthitta	GEN	Bhaskara Pillai P.	CPI	29,001	Chacko (Geevarghese) N. G.	INC	21,353
28	Aranmula	GEN	Gopinathan Pillai K.	INC	18,895	Vasudevan N. C.	CPI	18,630
29	Kallooppara	GEN	M. M. Mathai	INC	17,874	N. T. George	CPI	10,843
30	Thiruvalla	GEN	G. Padmanabhan Thampi	CPI	22,978	Kuruvila Thomas T.	INC	20,347
31	Chengannur	GEN	R. Sankara Narayanan Thampi	CPI	19,538	Saraswathi Amma K.	INC	13,546
32	Alleppey	GEN	T. V. Thomas	CPI	26,542	Nafeesa Beevi A.	INC	22,278
33	Mararikulam	GEN	Sadasivan C. G.	CPI	28,153	Joseph Mathen	INC	18,350
34	Sherthala	GEN	K. R. Gowri Amma	CPI	26,088	A. Subramonian Pillai	INC	22,756
35	Aroor	GEN	P. S. Karthikeyan	INC	23,956	Avira Tharakan	Independent	22,296
36	Thakazhi	GEN	Thomas John	INC	21,940	Varghese Vaidlian T. K.	CPI	16,480
37	Changanacherry	GEN	Kalyanakrishnan Nair M.	CPI	22,539	Raghavan Pillai P.	INC	19,693
38	Vazhoor	GEN	P. T. Chacko	INC	20,102	Raghava Kurup N.	CPI	20,022
39	Kanjirappally	GEN	Thomas K. T.	INC	14,896	Joseph	PSP	12,893
40	Puthuppally	GEN	P. C. Cherian	INC	20,396	George E. M.	CPI	19,000
41	Kottayam	GEN	Bhaskaran Nair P.	CPI	23,021	Govindhan Nair M. P.	INC	20,750
42	Ettumanoor	GEN	Joseph George	INC	21,423	Gopala Pillai C. S.	CPI	19,930
43	Meenachil	GEN	Joseph P. M.	INC	20,126	Thomas Mathai	Independent	13,462
44	Vaikom	GEN	K. R. Narayanan	INC	25,818	C. K. Viswanathan	CPI	25,164
45	Kaduthuruthy	GEN	M. C. Abraham	INC	22,365	Kurian Kurian	Independent	13,552
46	Ramamangalam	GEN	E. P. Poulose	INC	20,086	Parameswaran Nair	CPI	13,588
47	Muvattupuzha	GEN	K. M. George	INC	16,820	Kuruvilla Mattai (Mathew)	CPI	14,993
48	Devicolam	(SC)	Rosamma Punnose	CPI	33,809	Ganapathy N.	INC	31,887
	Bye Polls in 1958	Bye Polls in 1958	R. Punnose	COM	55,819	B. Nair	INC	48,730
49	Thodupuzha	GEN	Mathew C. A.	INC	22,149	Narayanan Nair K	CPI	11,680
50	Karikode	GEN	Kusuman Joseph	INC	14,669	Augustine Ouseph	Independent	12,084
51	Poonjar	GEN	Thomman T. A.	INC	21,279	Chacko Vallikkappan (Jocob)	CPI	9,045
52	Puliyannur	GEN	K. M. Joseph Chazhicatt	PSP	18,605	Prof.K.MChandy	INC	17,915
53	Palluruthy	GEN	Alexander Parambithar	INC	23,666	Gangadharan P.	CPI	19,848
54	Mattancherry	GEN	Viswanathan K. K.	INC	19,106	Aboo T. M	CPI	13,046
55	Narakkal	GEN	K. C. Abraham	INC	24,253	K. K. Ramakrishnan	CPI	22,321
56	Ernakulam	GEN	Jacob A. L.	INC	23,857	V. Ramankutty Menon	CPI	18,172
57	Kanayannur	GEN	Ramakrishnan T. K.	CPI	21,292	Joseph A. V.	INC	17,506
58	Alwaye	GEN	T. O. Bava	INC	23,707	Varkey M. C.	Independent	21,142
59	Perumbavoor	GEN	Govinda Pillai P.	CPI	21,679	K. A. Damodara Menon	INC	20,780
60	Kothakulangara	GEN	Anthony M. A.	INC	24,133	A. P. Kurian	CPI	15,246
61	Parur	GEN	Sivan Pillai N.	CPI	19,997	K. I. Mathew	INC	17,909
62	Vadakkekara	GEN	Balan K. A.	CPI	23,385	Vijayan K. R.	INC	17,844
63	Cranganore	GEN	E. Gopalakrishna Menon	CPI	20,385	Kunju Moideen A. K.	INC	18,894
64	Chalakkudy	(SC)	P. K. Chathan Master	CPI	43,454	C. J. Jenardhanan	PSP	42,997
65	Irinjalakuda	GEN	C. Achutha Menon	CPI	24,140	K. T. Achuthan	INC	21,480
66	Manalur	GEN	Joseph Mundassery	CPI	23,350	Sukumaran	INC	21,355
67	Trichur	GEN	A. R. Menon	Independent	23,531	K.Karunakaran	INC	21,045
68	Ollur	GEN	Paranchu R.	INC	15,994	Raghavan V.	CPI	15,915
69	Kunnamkulam	GEN	Krishnan T. K.	CPI	21,161	Velayudhan K. I.	INC	18,788
70	Wadakkanchery	(SC)	Ayyappan C. C.	CPI	33,161	Kochukuttan K	INC	28,895
71	Nattika	GEN	Achuthan K. S.	INC	23,594	Gopalakrishnan P. K.	CPI	22,039
72	Guruvayoor	GEN	Koru Kooliyat	Independent	16,722	Abubaker M. V.	INC	14,087
73	Andathodu	GEN	Kolady Govindan Kutty Menon	CPI	14,229	Karunakara Menon K. G.	INC	12,495
74	Ponnani	(SC)	Kunhambu Kallayan	INC	22,784	Kunhan Eliyath Tharayil	CPI	20,535
75	Kuzhalmannam	GEN	John Kuduvakkotte	Independent	19,437	Kesava Menon T.P.	INC	14,689
76	Alathur	GEN	Krishnan R.	CPI	19,203	Vaitheeswara Iyer P. S.	INC	13,317
77	Chittur	(SC)	Balachandra Menon P.	CPI	23,995	Eacharan K.	INC	22,062
78	Elapully	GEN	Ramankutty A. K.	CPI	16,768	Sankaran C. C.	INC	11,560
79	Palghat	GEN	Raghava Menon R.	INC	14,873	Kunhiraman M. P.	CPI	14,248
80	Parli	GEN	Narayanakutty C. K.	CPI	21,627	Gopalakrishnan Nair K.	INC	13,996
81	Mannarghat	GEN	Krishna Menon K.	CPI	13,375	Kochunny Nair K. C.	INC	9,665
82	Perinthalmanna	GEN	Govindan Nambiar	CPI	13,248	Pookoya Thangal Haji P. V.	Independent	9,398
83	Ottapalam	GEN	Kunhunni Nayar	CPI	16,157	Sundara Iyer N.	INC	15,248
84	Pattambi	GEN	Gopalan Erasseri Patinharethil	CPI	17,447	Padamanabha Menon K. P.	INC	9,793
85	Mankada	GEN	Mohammad Kodur Valia Peedikakkal	Independent	11,854	Mohammad Malavattath	INC	8,338
86	Tirur	GEN	Moideenkutty Hajee K.	Independent	15,404	Alikutty P. P.	INC	13,231
87	Tanur	GEN	C. H. Mohammed Koya	Independent	16,787	Assanar Kutty T.	INC	11,520
88	Kuttippuram	GEN	Ahamedkutty C.	Independent	15,495	Moideenkutty P. K.	INC	10,424
89	Thirurangady	GEN	K. Avukader Kutty Naha	Independent	17,622	Kunhalikutty Haji A.	INC	16,670
90	Malappuram	GEN	Hassan Gani K.	Independent	17,214	Saidalavi P.	INC	12,243
91	Manjeri	(SC)	P. P. Ummer Koya	INC	30,860	Chadayan M.	Independent	29,101
92	Kondotty	GEN	M. P. M. Ahammed Kurikkal	Independent	18,981	Abubakar Kolakadan	INC	11,866
93	Kozhikode I	GEN	Sarada Krishnan	INC	17,388	Manjunatha Rao H.	CPI	16,079
94	Kozhikode I I	GEN	Kumaran P.	INC	18,586	E. Janardhanan	Independent	11,211
95	Chevayur	GEN	Balagopalan A.	INC	20,683	Raghavan Nair	CPI	17,319
96	Kunnamangalam	GEN	Leela Damodara Menon	INC	13,598	Chathunni Ottayil K.	CPI	11,814
97	Koduvally	GEN	Gopalankutty Nair M.	INC	19,377	Muhammedkutty C.	Independent	15,950
98	Balusseri	GEN	Narayana Kurup M.	PSP	15,789	Raghavan Nair E.	INC	11,536
99	Quilandy	GEN	Kunhiraman Nambiar	PSP	19,668	Achuthan Nair P.	INC	16,622
100	Perambra	GEN	Kumaran Madathil	CPI	17,838	Madhavan Nair T K.	INC	15,827
101	Badagara	GEN	Kelu Mandoti Kuniyil	CPI	17,123	Krishnan	PSP	15,448
102	Nadapuram	GEN	Kanaran C. H.	CPI	18,533	Kunhammad Haji V. K.	INC	15,177
103	Wynad	(SC)	Kunjikrishnan Nair N. K.	INC	31,993	Madura	INC	29,296
104	Kuthuparamba	GEN	Ramunny Kurup	PSP	21,540	Madhavan P. K.	CPI	14,858
105	Mattannur	GEN	Balaram N. E.	CPI	23,540	Kunhiraman Nair	INC	13,089
106	Tellicherry	GEN	V. R. Krishna Iyer	Independent	27,318	Kunhiraman P.	INC	15,234
107	Cannanore I	GEN	Kannan Chaliyoth	CPI	17,464	Gopalan Othayoth	INC	17,413
108	Cannanore II	GEN	K. P. Gopalan	CPI	21,493	Madhavan Pamban	INC	18,776
109	Madayi	GEN	Gopalan Nambiar K. P. R.	CPI	24,390	T. Narayanan Nambiar	INC	12,169
110	Rikkur	GEN	Narayanan Nambiar T. C.	CPI	24,518	Narayanan Nambissan	INC	11,052
111	Nileswar	(SC)	Kallalan	CPI	44,754	E. M. S. Namboodiripad	CPI	38,090
112	Hosdrug	GEN	K. Chandrasekharan	PSP	14,150	Madhavan K.	CPI	11,209
113	Kasaragod	GEN	Kunhikrishan Nair Cheripady	INC	10,290	Narayanan Nambiar	PSP	10,096
114	Manjeshwar	GEN	M. Umesh Rao	Independent	Uncontested			

== Government formation ==
Communist Party of India formed the government with the support of five independents. On 5 April 1957, E. M. S. Namboodiripad became the chief minister of Kerala and first non–Congress chief minister of the country (PSP ruled Travencore Cochin state before). But the government was dismissed in 1959 by the central government following the Liberation struggle led by Syro-Malabar Church and Hindu caste organisations such as the Nair Service Society headed by Mannathu Padmanabha Pillai.

== See also ==
- First Namboodiripad ministry
- 1957 elections in India
- 1954 Travancore-Cochin Legislative Assembly election
