= First Namboodiripad ministry =

Indian state ministry in Kerala (1957–1959)

First EMS Namboothiripad Ministry
- 1st Cabinet of Kerala
- 5 April 1957 – 31 July 1959
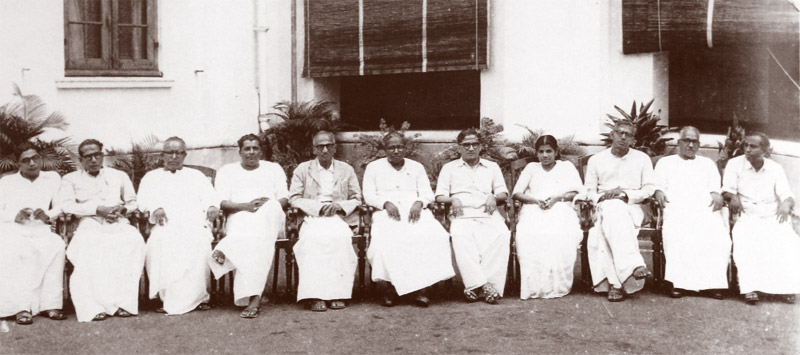
- Date formed: 5 April 1957
- Date dissolved: 31 July 1959

People and organisations
- Head of government: E. M. S. Namboodiripad
- Member party: Communist Party of India
- Status in legislature: Minority with support from independents
- Opposition party: Indian National Congress
- Opposition leader: P. T. Chacko

History
- Election: 1957
- Successor: Pattom Thanu Pillai ministry

The Council of Ministers (1957–59) of Legislative Assembly, Kerala state (better known as E. M. S. Namboodiripad ministry - first term) was the first Council of Ministers, the executive wing of state government, in the Indian state of Kerala. The ministry was led (Chief Minister) by Communist Party of India leader E. M. S. Namboodiripad from 5 April 1957 to 31 July 1959 and had eleven ministries.

One of the first democratically elected Communist governments in the world after San Marino (1942–1947), Namboodiripad and his cabinet are known for their introduction of the Land Reform Ordinance and the Education Bill. The government was dismissed in 1959 by the Central Government, which invoked the controversial Article 356 of the Indian Constitution, following what later became known as The Liberation Struggle.

The State of Kerala was formed on 1 November 1956 as per the States Reorganisation Act of 1956. The erstwhile Travancore-Cochin and the Malabar district of Madras state were reorganized to form the state of Kerala. After the first ever elections to the Kerala Legislative Assembly in 1957, the Communist Party of India emerged as the single largest party. E M S Namboodiripad formed the first elected government with the support of 5 independent legislators. The government was not able to complete its full 5 years term. Government was dismissed by the President of India by the use of Article 356 of Indian constitution following the 'Liberation Struggle' (Vimochana Samaram in Malayalam).

The Kerala Council of Ministers, during Namboodiripad's term as Chief Minister of Kerala, consisted of: 6

	Minister	Ministry/Portfolio	Party
1	E. M. S. Namboodiripad	Chief Minister	Communist Party of India
2	C. Achutha Menon	Minister for Finance	Communist Party of India
3	K. P. Gopalan	Minister for Industries	Communist Party of India
4	K. R. Gowri Amma	Minister for Revenue and Excise	Communist Party of India
5	Joseph Mundassery	Minister for Education and Cooperation	Communist Party of India
6	T. V. Thomas	Minister for Labour, Employment and Transport	Communist Party of India
7	P. K. Chathan Master	Minister for Local Self Government	Communist Party of India
8	T. A. Majeed	Minister for Public Works	Communist Party of India
9	K. C. George	Minister for Food and Forest	Communist Party of India
10	V. R. Krishna Iyer	Minister for Irrigation, Prisons, Law and Electricity	Independent
11	A. R. Menon	Minister for Health	Independent
