= Palarivattom Flyover scam =

Public sector scam in Kerala

The Palarivattom Flyover was a poorly built infrastructure project at the Pipeline Junction in the National Highway 66 Bypass in Kochi, Kerala, India. It began construction in 2014 and was shut down in 2019. Five people were bought to trial regarding corruption and misuse of public funds in relation to the project.

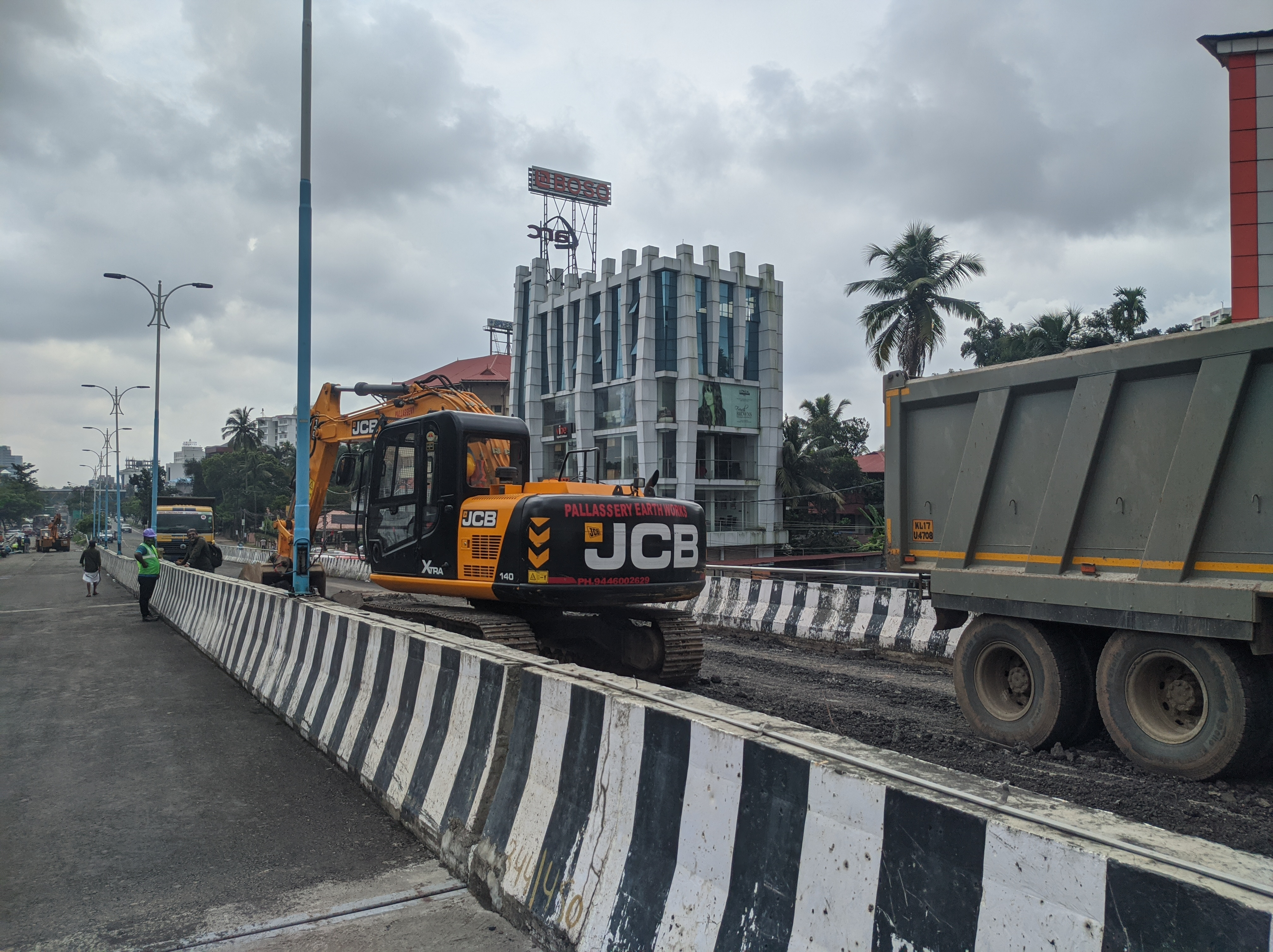
Palarivattom Flyover before demolition

== Timeline ==
- 2014: The flyover construction began under Congress led UDF government in Kerala.
- October 16, 2016: The 640 metre flyover was inaugurated in Kochi.
- May 1, 2019: The flyover was shut down after major flaws were detected in the structure.
- February 5, 2020: Kerala Governor Arif Mohammed Khan granted permission to prosecute former PWD minister and Muslim League leader VK Ebrahim Kunju MLA in the Palarivattom flyover scam.
- February 29, 2020: The vigilance and anti-corruption bureau interrogated V. K. Ebrahim Kunju.
- March 9, 2020: The Kerala Vigilance and Anti-Corruption Bureau conducted raids the residence of V K Ebrahim Kunju in Kochi.
- June 2020: A team from Ministry of Road Transport and Highways (MoRTH) inspected the Palarivattom flyover.
- July 2020: The Ministry of Road Transport and Highways (MoRTH) submitted a report to the state government recommending urgent action to reinforce the structure, particularly the supporting pillars, to avoid collapse.
- September 22, 2020: The Supreme Court allowed Kerala state to reconstruct the flyover, taking into account the public safety aspect. Earlier the Kerala state government had approached the Supreme Court after the High Court ordered a load test to be conducted before the decision to demolish the flyover.
- September 28, 2020: The demolition of the flyover began at 9 am.
- March 7, 2021 : The flyover was reopened.

== Investigation and arrests ==
Sumeet Goyal, the first accused and contractor had misappropriated the ‘mobilization advance’ fund amount of Rs 8.25 crore to meet his personal financial crisis. He then later compromised on the quality of the construction of flyover. MT Thankachan, the second accused and the former assistant general manager (RBDCK) helped the contractor by intentionally selecting his bid even though it lacked sufficient documents to prove criteria of the contractor. He also did not inform other bidders about the provision of mobilization advance.

Along with RBDCK, which was directly in charge of the project, the project had appointed KITCO as the consultant of the flyover construction.

It was KITCO's responsibility to evaluate the technical report prepared by RBDCK and further prepare a Detailed Project Report of the project. The technical report prepared by RBDCK lacked certain necessary documents, and the third accused Benny Paul, who is the joint general manager of KITCO, did not reject the project proposal. Benny Pau had recommended RBDCK for the construction of the flyover. Benny Paul is accused for not properly monitoring the work as well. Vigilance report also indicates the criminal conspiracy between Sumeet Goyal, MT Thankachan and Benny Paul.

TO Soorej, the fourth accused in the case, at the time of implementation of the project was holding the office of secretary at PWD and member secretary of Kerala Road Fund Board (KRFB). Kerala Road Fund Board was the funding agency of this project. As per the agreement of the project, 30 percent of the ‘running bill’ – issued by contractor on completion of part of the work – can be deducted as recovery of mobilization advance given during the beginning of the project. But as per the vigilance report, TO Soorej had given a direction to KRFB stating that only 10 percent of running bill needs to be deducted. This has caused a huge loss to the public exchequer.

Sooraj alleged that it was the then PWD minister V K Ebrahim Kunju who ordered to give advance without interest. On 5 February 2020, Kerala Governor Arif Mohammed Khan had granted permission to prosecute former PWD minister and Muslim League leader VK Ebrahim Kunju MLA in the Palarivattom flyover scam. Further, the vigilance and anti-corruption bureau had interrogated V. K. Ebrahim Kunju and raided his residence.

The vigilance had levelled charges, including corruption, conspiracy and misuse of funds against :

1. V K Ebrahim Kunju, the former minister for Public Works Department (PWD)
2. T O Sooraj, former secretary, public works
3. Sumit Goyal, former managing director of Kerala Industrial and Technical Consultancy Organisation (KITCO)
4. P D Thankachan, general manager, Roads and Bridges Development Corporation of Kerala Limited (RBDCK)
5. Benny Paul, the joint general manager of KITCO (which provided technical expertise for this project)

The vigilance has questioned 29 witnesses in the course of the investigation.

Two police officers were suspended by Vigilance Director Anil Kanth after an investigation found them guilty of trying to sabotage Vigilance and Anti Corruption Bureau probe into the Palarivattom flyover corruption case involving former PWD Minister V K Ebrahim Kunju. A Ashok Kumar, the former investigating officer of the case and the Vigilance Ernakulam unit DySP along with Fort Police Station SHO K K Sheri was suspended. Ashok Kumar was found to be taking soft on Ebrahim Kunju despite having strong evidences against the former minister. K K Sheri, the SHO had acted as a mediator between the accused minister and the DySP.

== Rebuilding Palarivattom Flyover ==
- Kerala chief minister Pinarayi Vijayan announced the rebuilding of Palarivattom Flyover under the supervision of ‘Metro Man’ and the Delhi Metro Rail Corporation (DMRC) Principal Advisor E Sreedharan. The reconstruction work will be undertaken by Uralungal Labour Contract Cooperative Society (ULCCS) Ltd.
- On September 28, 2020, the first phase of flyover demolition was initiated. The rubble and other materials of the demolished bridge was transported to Chellanam. The material was used for preventing sea erosion at the shore.
- On October 2, 2020, the second phase of flyover demolition was initiated. It included the cutting of concrete slabs from the spans.
- In an order issued on October 7, 2020, the state government directed the Roads and Bridges Development Corporation of Kerala Limited (RBDCK) to take necessary steps to recover the cost of reconstruction from the original contractor. Subsequently, the RBDCK decided to recover cost of Palarivattom flyover reconstruction from RDS Projects.
- The demolition and reconstruction work of the bridge is estimated to cost Rs 18.71 crore.
- Delhi Metro Rail Corporation said that they are not seeking any government funding for the work as they will be using the fund available with DMRC from earlier contracts.
- The four-lane Palarivattom flyover was rebuilt in a record time of five months and 10 days. It had no official inauguration, as the model code of conduct for 2021 Kerala Assembly Election was in vogue. The Public works Department's (PWD) National Highways division chief engineer opened the flyover on March 7, 2021, at 4 pm. The Kerala state PWD Minister G. Sudhakaran was also present at the time of re-opening.

== Comparison with Panchavadi Palam ==
On September 28, 1984, a movie titled Panchavadi Palam was a major hit in Kerala. Filmmaker K G George, made this political satire, one of the best in Malayalam cinema, on a theme that involves the destruction of a bridge, shortly after its inauguration. As a metaphor for endemic corruption, the collapse of Palarivattom flyover invited close comparisons with Panchavadi Palam in Kerala's public sphere. Ironically, the demolition of Palarivattom flyover also happened 36 years after the film release, but on another September 28.

In a serious remark, the Kerala High Court referred the badly constructed Palarivattom flyover to popular Malayalam film "Panchavadi Palam". The film appears to have turned true in the case of the Palarivattom flyover, the court observed, indicating the deal among politicians, bureaucracy and contractor.
