= Kerala Education Act, 1958 =

Government Act

The Kerala Education Act, 1958 (Act 6 of 1959) is a law in Kerala.

The Education Bill was introduced in the Kerala assembly by Professor Joseph Mundasseri, who was then the education minister for the first elected (1957) Communist Party of India government. This bill was aimed at eradicating the malpractices prevalent in the private sector educational institutes, and attempted to regulate the educational institutions' function, including standardizing syllabi and pay structures. The Syrian Christian church and Nair Service Society, along with opposition parties, including Indian National Congress, started the political struggle to overthrow the E. M. S. Namboodiripad government.

The Education Bill sought to regulate appointments and conditions of teachers. Salaries of teachers were to be paid through the treasury. There was a provision of takeover of management of educational institutions, which arguably violated the constitution. Nevertheless, the Supreme Court rejected the appeal and the bill received the assent of the president of India.

Even though the Education Bill failed to pass through the Assembly, many of its provisions were later implemented by subsequent governments with amendments.
