= P. Rajeeve =

Indian politician

P. Rajeev
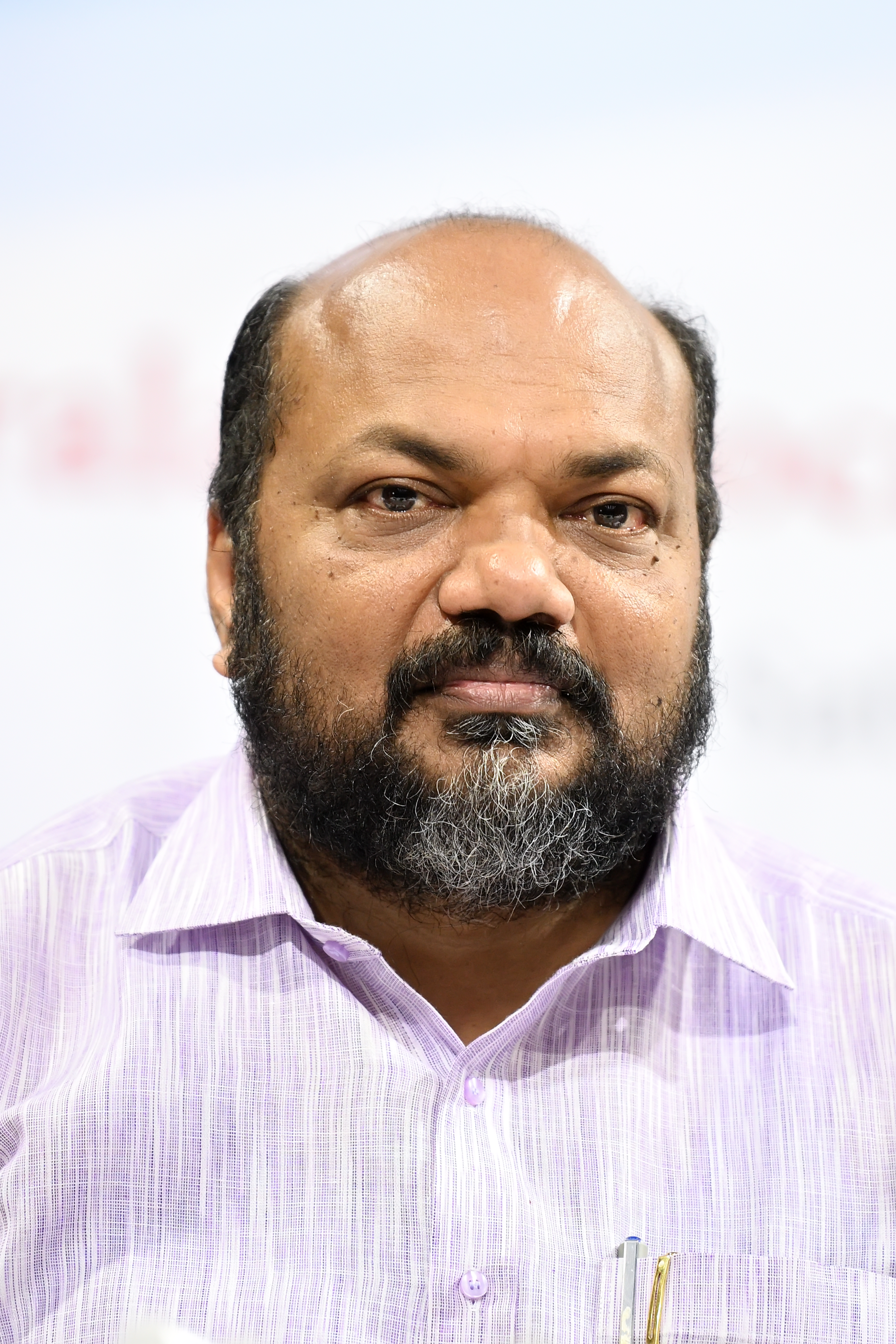

Minister for Industries, Law and Coir, Government of Kerala
- In office 20 May 2021 – 23 May 2026
- Governor: Arif Mohammad Khan
- Chief Minister: Pinarayi Vijayan
Departments
List
- Law
- Industries
- Industrial Co-operatives
- Commerce
- Mining and Geology
- Handlooms and Textiles
- Khadi and Village Industries
- Coir
- Cashew Industry
- Plantation Directorate
- Preceded by: E. P. Jayarajan (as Minister for Industries); A. K. Balan (as Minister for Law); T. M. Thomas Isaac (as Minister for Coir)
- Succeeded by: P. K. Kunhalikutty (Industries); V.D. Satheesan (Law); Ramesh Chennithala (Coir)

Member of parliament, Rajya Sabha
- In office 22 April 2009 – 21 April 2015
- Constituency: Kerala

Member of Kerala Legislative Assembly
- In office 24 May 2021 – 4 May 2026
- Preceded by: V. K. Ebrahimkunju
- Succeeded by: V. E. Abdul Gafoor
- Constituency: Kalamassery

Personal details
- Born: 1 January 1967 (age 59) Meladoor, Annamanada, Thrissur district, Kerala
- Party: Communist Party of India (Marxist)
- Spouse: Vani Kesari
- Children: 2
- Education: Government Law College, Ernakulam (LL.B.)

Punnadath Rajeev is an Indian politician, who served as the Minister for Industries, Law and Coir in the Government of Kerala.

== Early life and career ==
Rajeev was elected to Rajya Sabha on 27 April 2009. He is a native of Meladoor in Thrissur district. He was born to Radha Vasudevan and late P. Vasudevan (Retired Revenue Inspector) of Punnadath house.

Rajeev completed his schooling at Government Samithy High School, Meladoor and then joined for his pre degree education at Christ College, Irinjalakuda. He graduated in Economics from the St. Paul's College, Kalamassery and later took his LL.B degree from the Government Law College, Ernakulam. He also holds a diploma in Chemical Engineering from Government Polytechnic College, Kalamassery, where he started his political activism. He was a practising lawyer at the High Court of Kerala before taking full-time political and organizational responsibilities.

Rajeev is married to Dr. Vani Kesari who is teaching law at the School of Legal Studies, Cochin University of Science and Technology. The couple have two daughters, Hridhya Rajeev and Haritha Rajeev.

Rajeev is one of the Secretariat members of CPI(M) Kerala State committee. He was a member of parliament (Rajya Sabha) from 2009 to 2015. Rajeev had been the most active member of the upper house during his stint and had raised several popular issues in the house. When he retired, leaders from most political parties pleaded with CPI(M) general secretary Sitaram Yechury to consider getting Rajeev elected again to the parliament. He was highly praised for his parliamentary performance by political opponents like former finance minister Arun Jaitley, Congress leader Gulam Nabi Azad, BSP supremo Mayawati and Rajya Sabha deputy chairman P. J. Kurien. His Parliamentary performance was highly applauded and was outstanding. He won the Sansad Ratna Award in 2016 for his outstanding contributions in the Parliament.

In 2019 Indian general election, he contested from Ernakulam (Lok Sabha constituency). In 2020, his book Bharanaghadana: Charithravum Samskaravum received the Abu Dhabi Sakthi Award in the scholarly literature category.

In the 2021 Kerala Legislative Assembly Election, Rajeev defeated V. E. Abdul Gafoor of the Indian Union Muslim League and got elected from Kalamassery state assembly constituency, Ernakulam District. P Rajeev was included in the second Pinarayi Vijayan ministry as Minister for Industries.

== Political career ==
Rajeev started his public life as an organizer of the Students' Federation of India (SFI) being active from his School days. Later he became the President and then Secretary of SFI Kerala State Committee. He also held positions including the Joint Secretary and Vice President of SFI Central Committee. Later he was active in the Democratic Youth Federation of India (DYFI) where he held the post of district secretary. Rajeev is now a Central committee member of CPI(M). Rajeev also served as the Chief Editor of Deshabhimani Daily. He was defeated by Adv. V.E Abdul Gafoor of the Indian Union Muslim League in the assembly elections held in 2026.
