= Kerala Public Works Department =

Government agency in Kerala, India

Agency overview
- Formed: 1823; 203 years ago
- Preceding agencies: Panivakai Maramath- Kingdom of Travancore; Cochin Maramath- Kingdom of Cochin
- Headquarters: Thiruvananthapuram, Kerala, India
- Annual budget: ₹6,149.30 crore (US$660 million) (2026–27, revised)
- Minister responsible: Sri. P. K. Basheer, Minister of Public Works
- Agency executive: Adeela Abdulla IAS, Secretary of Public Works
- Parent agency: Government of Kerala
- Child agencies: RBDCK; KSTP; KSCC; KRFB
- Website: KeralaPWD

Kerala Public Works Department (KPWD) is a department under the government of the state of Kerala, India. It manages the construction and maintenance of civil structures owned by the government viz; government buildings, government owned hospitals (part of the public health system), roads, bridges etc. The KPWD was formed in 1956 following reorganization of states.

== History ==
In Kochi, British Residents had a separate department called Public Works Commission to carry off construction works in British Cochin. The kingdom had its own Marmath Department since 1825, as a separate agency to monitor construction of roads and palaces.

In 1901, the Kingdoms of Travancore and Kochi agreed to have an unified PWD Code and a permanent Joint commission of PWD Engineers in both sides were formed. The Travancore Maramath was headed by a chief engineer, whereas it was a Diwan Peshkar (State Secretary) who headed Kochi Marmath.

In 1949, when United State of Travancore-Cochin was formed, both the Maramath Departments were merged and renamed as Kerala PWD. Over the years the department has grown substantially and now has 8 Chief Engineers, 25 Superintending Engineers, 76 Executive Engineers, 289 Assistant Executive Engineers, 639 Assistant Engineers and other supporting staff.

== About Department ==
The department is headed by a senior minister of cabinet rank. Presently P. K. Basheer, representing Eranad Constituency is the minister for PWD. The Minister is assisted by a senior IAS officer, Secretary for Public Works who heads the secretariat functions. As a technical department, it has a council composed of Chief Engineers and technical advisors along with nominated representatives from economical and social spheres.
The department is organised into various wings: the Roads Wing, Design Wing, Architecture Wing, Buildings Wing, Bridges Wing, Road Maintenance Wing, Administration Wing and National Highways Wing. Each wing is headed by a Chief Engineer (CE) and functions as a field-level administrative unit.
Under the Chief Engineer, there are Superintending Engineers or circle offices. Each circle consists of a number of Divisions under the control of Executive Engineers (EEs). The Divisions are divided into subdivisions under the control of Assistant Executive Engineers (AEEs) and the Subdivisions in turn are divided into a number of Sections under charge of Assistant Engineers (AEs).

== Wings ==
=== Administration Wing ===
This wing is headed by a Chief Engineer (Administration) and deals with matters related to the general administration and human resources management pertains to the whole department. Establishment matters, human resource development, Information technology & e-Governance related matters and internal vigilance are the main functions of this wing. Administration wing functions from the head office at Thiruvananthapuram and there are no sub-offices for this wing at any parts of the State. The following are the main sections under the administration wing.

=== Roads Wing ===
Roads wing deals with the planning, project preparation, construction, maintenance and arrangement of works of all State Highways and Major District Roads under the State. This wing is having its headquarters at Thiruvananthapuram and is under the control of a Chief Engineer (Roads) who is assisted by a Deputy Chief Engineer, a Senior Finance Officer and supported by technical and other ministerial staff. This wing have field offices with Circle offices at regional level, division offices at district level, sub-division offices at taluk level and Section offices at the lowest level.

There are three Circle offices under the roads wing namely south circle, Central circle and North circle each headed by a Superintending Engineer. Under each Circle offices there are division offices headed by an Executive Engineer. The sub-division offices are headed by Assistant Executive Engineer and Section offices are headed by Assistant Engineer.

PWD roads constitute 15 per cent of the total road network in the State carrying which carries nearly 80 per cent of the total road traffic within the State. The total length of roads maintained by Roads Wing is 29109.68 km out of which 4127.74 km is State Highways and 24975.34 km is Major District Roads (MDRs) .

=== Bridges Wing ===
Bridges wing is formed exclusively for the construction and maintenance of various types of bridges under Kerala PWD on 27.03.2018 as a part of the initiative "Puthiya kalam Puthiya nirmanam". This wing is formed based on the Road and Bridge Maintenance Policy of the Government. This wing is headed by a Chief Engineer (Bridges) with supporting staff. This wing is having its headquarters at Thiruvananthapuram with two circle offices seven division offices fourteen subdivisions and forty section offices.

A total number of 2768 bridges are being maintained by PWD Bridges Wing, Kerala out of which 427 bridges are in State Highways and 1938 are in Major District Roads/ Other District Roads.

=== National Highways Wing ===
National Highways wing of the State PWD was formed for the maintenance and upkeep of National Highways entrusted to State PWD in accordance with NH Act 1956 by Ministry of Road Transport and Highways(MoRTH), Government of India. There are 11 National Highways in Kerala with a total length of 1781.36 km and of which 548 km of NH is currently maintained by the State PWD. The remaining 1233.5 km is currently with the National Highway Authority of India (NHAI) as part of the four/six laning programme of MoRTH.

This wing is headed by a Chief Engineer (National Highways), and supported by other officials. NH wing is having its headquarters at Thiruvananthapuram and is under the control of a Chief Engineer of the Public Works Department assisted by 2 Superintendenting Engineers located in 2 circle offices and 4 Executive Engineers in 4 NH Divisions. The NH Divisional Offices are located in Kollam, Muvattupuzha, Malappuram, and Kozhikode.

=== Buildings Wing ===
The buildings wing deals with the planning, project preparation, construction, maintenance and arrangement of works including water supply, electrification and electronic works of public buildings. The headquarters of buildings wing is at Thiruvananthapuram and is under the control of a Chief Engineer assisted by Deputy Chief Engineer and a Senior Finance Officer supported by technical and non-technical staff. The organisational structure of buildings wing is as below

Apart from the regular field offices like circle, division, sub-division and section offices, the following additional offices also works under the Buildings wing

=== Projects Wing ===
Projects wing is formed to execute externally aided projects and specialised projects. Currently this wing is executing the World Bank aided Kerala State Transport Project (KSTP). Administration head of this wing will be the IAS officer (Project Director) and technically headed by a Chief Engineer. The main aim of this wing is upgradation of the State Highway. The organisational structure of Projects wing is as below

Apart from the regular field offices like two circle and four division offices, the following additional offices also works under the Projects wing

- Design Wing

Design wing of PWD deals with the design, research, investigation and quality control aspects of various infrastructure projects and is headed by a Chief Engineer. Chief Engineer is assisted by the Director (Research & Quality Control), Director (Buildings) and Director (Highways) in the design and quality control aspects.

At present, the department is having specialised units for structural design of buildings, design of bridges, design of highways, Geotechnical engineering unit, Environmental engineering unit, MEP design unit for Building services (Electrical design, Plumbing design and HVAC design) and a project preparation unit with sufficient staff strength. The Design wing is functioning with headquarters in the office of the Chief Engineer (Design) in Thiruvananthapuram known as Chief Design Office (CDO). In addition there are Regional Design Offices (RDO) at Eranakulum and Kozhikode. Apart from this there is a full-fledged investigation and quality control wing under the Design wing which is having regional I&QC laboratories at Thiruvananthapuram, Eranakulam and Kozhikode with sufficient district level quality control laboratories.

The Kerala Highway Research Institute (KHRI) at Thiruvananthapuram carries out research & quality control works and gives advice and guidance for advanced construction works undertaken by the department. KHRI has well established laboratories for Soil Mechanics and Foundation Division, Concrete Division, Traffic Division and Flexible Pavement Division.

=== Road Maintenance Wing ===
Road Maintenance wing is formed for maintaining various types of roads under the control of Kerala PWD through the adoption of new technologies and methods. This wing is formed based on the Road and Bridge Maintenance Policy of the Government. This wing is headed by a Chief Engineer (Road Maintenance) with supporting staff. This wing is having its headquarters at Thiruvananthapuram with seven division offices fourteen subdivisions. The organisational setup of the Road Maintenance wing is as shown below

- Architectural Wing

The Architectural wing is responsible for the preparation and finalization of all architectural designs and drawings for buildings and similar works to be executed by the Public Works Department. Though primarily intended for the Buildings branch, the assistance of Architectural wing is taken for architectural designs in the other areas of construction such as bridges, highway structures, landscaping and urban beautification works etc. This wing headed by a Chief Architect and supported by other Architects having its main office in Thiruvananthapuram . There are two regional offices also at Ernakulam and Kozhikode. The organizational setup of the Architectural wing is as shown below

== Allied institutions ==
In addition to the various wings of the Public Works Department, institutions such as the Kerala State Transport Project (KSTP), Kerala State Construction Corporation (KSCC), Kerala Road Fund Board (KRFB), Roads and Bridges Development Corporation of Kerala (RBDCK), and Road Infrastructure Company Kerala (RICK) also operate under the Public Works Department.

The following organisations are functioning under the Department.

- Kerala State Transport Project (KSTP)
- Roads and Bridges Development Corporation of Kerala Ltd (RBDCK).
- Kerala Road Fund Board (KRFB)
- Kerala State Construction Corporation Ltd. (KSCC)
- Kerala Rapid Transit Corporation Ltd
- Road Infrastructure Company Kerala Limited (RICK)

== Rest Houses ==
PWD also have several Tourist Bungalows located in various important tourist destinations, available for tourists for daily rent, though the government has started the process of handing over several TBs to KTDC.

== List of Ministers ==
List of Cabinet Ministers who held the Public Works Department portfolio in various ministries:

No.	Name	Term Start	Term End	Party	Chief Minister
1	T. A. Majeed	5 April 1957	31 July 1959	CPI	E. M. S. Namboodiripad
2	D. Damodaran Potti	22 February 1960	26 September 1962	PSP	Pattom A. Thanu Pillai
3	P. P. Ummer Koya	8 September 1962	10 September 1964	INC	R. Sankar
4	D. Damodaran Potti	26 September 1962	8 October 1962	PSP	R. Sankar
5	T. K. Divakaran	6 March 1967	21 October 1969	RSP	E. M. S. Namboodiripad
6	C. Achutha Menon	1 November 1969	3 August 1970	CPI	Himself
7	T. K. Divakaran	4 October 1970	19 January 1976	RSP	C. Achutha Menon
8	K. Pankajakshan	4 February 1976	25 March 1977	RSP	C. Achutha Menon
9	K. Pankajakshan	25 March 1977	25 April 1977	RSP	K. Karunakaran
10	K. Pankajakshan	27 April 1977	27 October 1978	RSP	A. K. Antony
11	K. Pankajakshan	29 October 1978	7 October 1979	RSP	P. K. Vasudevan Nair
12	N. K. Balakrishnan	12 October 1979	1 December 1979	PSP	C. H. Mohammed Koya
13	P. M. Aboobacker	25 January 1980	20 October 1981	IUML	E. K. Nayanar
14	C. H. Mohammed Koya (as Deputy Chief Minister of Kerala)	28 December 1981	17 March 1982	IUML	K. Karunakaran
15	C. H. Mohammed Koya (as Deputy Chief Minister of Kerala)	24 May 1982	28 September 1983	IUML	K. Karunakaran
16	K. Avukader kutty Naha (as Deputy Chief Minister of Kerala)	24 October 1983	25 March 1987	IUML	K. Karunakaran
17	T. K. Hamza	2 April 1987	17 June 1991	CPI(M)	E. K. Nayanar
18	P. K. K. Bava	29 June 1991	16 March 1995	IUML	K. Karunakaran
19	C. T. Ahammed Ali	22 March 1995	9 May 1996	IUML	A. K. Antony
20	P. J. Joseph	20 May 1996	13 May 2001	Kerala Congress	E. K. Nayanar
21	M. K. Muneer	17 May 2001	29 August 2004	IUML	A. K. Antony
22	M. K. Muneer	31 August 2004	12 May 2006	IUML	Oommen Chandy
23	P. J. Joseph	17 May 2006	4 September 2006	Kerala Congress	V. S. Achuthanandan
24	T. U. Kuruvilla	15 September 2006	4 September 2007	Kerala Congress	V. S. Achuthanandan
25	Mons Joseph	18 October 2007	16 August 2009	Kerala Congress	V. S. Achuthanandan
26	P. J. Joseph	17 August 2009	30 April 2010	Kerala Congress	V. S. Achuthanandan
27	V. K. Ebrahim Kunju	18 May 2011	25 May 2016	IUML	Oommen Chandy
28	G. Sudhakaran	25 May 2016	24 May 2021	CPI(M)	Pinarayi Vijayan
29	P. A. Mohammed Riyas	25 May 2021	9 April 2026	CPI(M)	Pinarayi Vijayan
30	P. K. Basheer	18 May 2026	Present	IUML	V. D. Satheesan

== See also ==
- Roads in Kerala
- Roads and Bridges Development Corporation
- Central Public Works Department
