= Abdurrahiman Bafaki Tangal =

Indian politician and businessman

Sayyid Abdul Rahman Bafakhy Thangal
- Born: 19 February 1905; Quilandy, Madras Presidency
- Died: 19 January 1973 (aged 67); Mecca, Saudi Arabia
- Occupations: Politician; Community Leader; Business
- Website: bafakhythangaltrust.in

Signature
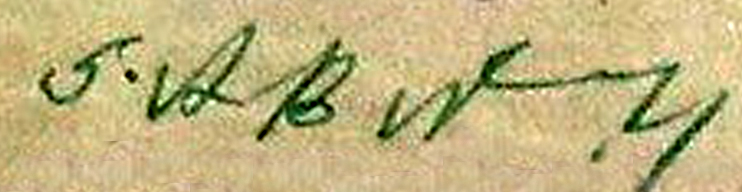

Abdul Rahman Bafakhy Thangal (1905–1973) was an Indian community leader and politician from Kerala. Until his death in the early 1973, Bafakhy Thangal remained the most prominent Muslim political leader in Kerala. He is generally credited with transforming the perception of the Indian Union Muslim League inside Kerala.

Bafakhy Thangal belonged to a sayyid family of jurists (the "Ba Faqih") in north Kerala. The Yemeni-origin family was settled in Kerala in the early 18th century. The Bafakhy Thangals were also a prominent business family in the city of Kozhikode by being international rice traders.

Bafakhy Thangal was born to Abdul Qadir Bafakhy Thangal and Fathima Mulla Beevi on 19 February 1905 at Koyilandy. After studies at Ponnani, he moved to the lucrative export business at Calicut, became a prominent businessman, and eventually established the Bafaqi & Co. at Yangon, Myanmar.

Bafakhy Thangal entered active politics in 1936 as a campaigner against an All-India Muslim League candidate from Kozhikode-Kurumbranad Constituency. He subsequently joined the League (1938), and rapidly rose to become the President of the Malabar Muslim League. He also helped to persuade Panakkad Pukkoya Thangal, a sayyid community leader from South Malabar, to join the League. When Kerala State was formed in 1956, he was chosen as the President of the Kerala State Muslim League.

Bafakhy Thangal also served as the leader of the Samastha Kerala Jamiyyat al-Ulama. He is remembered for his organisation of the sector of madarasa education (institutions where children receive basic Islamic education) in Kerala.

Bafakhy Thangal is generally credited for

- Transforming the perception Indian Union Muslim League inside Kerala.
- Representing all the differences within the large Kerala Muslim community.
- Forming an alliance with the PSP in the 1957 assembly elections.
- Joining the Liberation Struggle against the Communist government.
- Successfully negotiating with the Congress (1959–60) and the Left (1967 and 1969) leadership for the Muslim League.
- Founder of Bafakhy Yatheemkhanain Valavannur 1979

Bafakhy Thangal died in 1973 while on a pilgrimage to the holy city of Mecca, and was interred in Mecca.

== Family ==
Bafaki Tangal married five times:

- Tanur Puthan Veetil Khadeeja Beevi
- Koilandy Shareefa Amina Beevi
- Koilandy Puthiya Maliykkal Muthu Beevi
- Chaliyam Khadeeja Beevi
- Puthiyangadi Shareefa Beevi
