= Manoj Abraham =

Indian Police officer

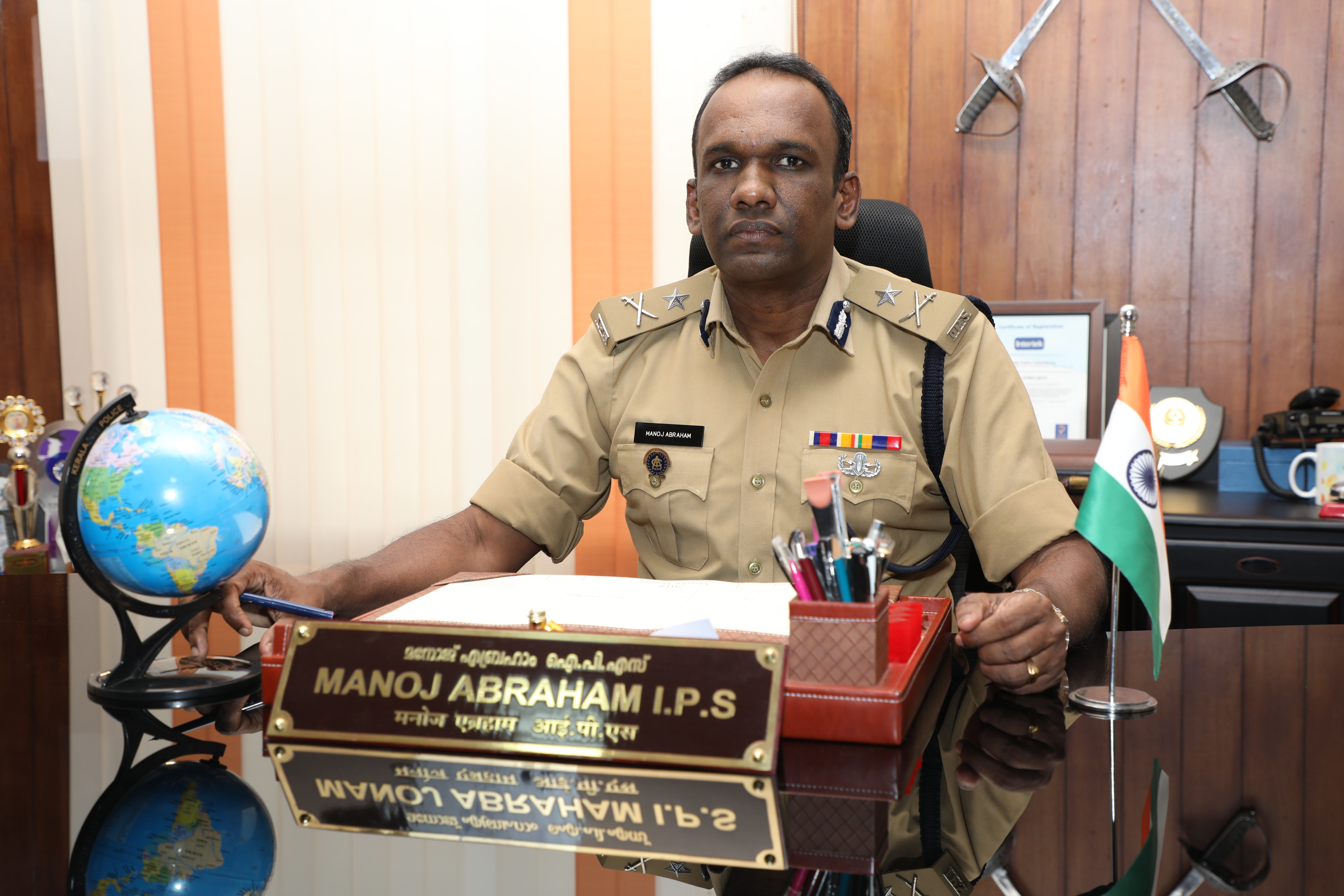
- Born: June 3, 1971 (age 55); Kottayam Melukavu, Kerala, India
- Education: University of Hyderabad, Osmania University
- Spouse: Shyno
- Police career
- Country: India
- Allegiance: Indian Police Service
- Department: Police Department
- Service years: 31
- Status: Director General, Fire & Rescue Services
- Rank: Director General of Police
- Awards: President's Police Medal for Distinguished Service; Police Medal for Meritorious Service

Manoj Abraham (born 3 June 1971) is an Indian Police Service officer and serves in the office as Director, Vigilance and Anti-Corruption Bureau. He is a 1994 batch Indian Police Service (IPS) officer and has the rank of Director General of Police (DGP). He was the nodal officer of Kerala Police Cyberdome, the cyber security initiative of the Kerala Police.

== Career ==
Abraham joined the Indian Police Service as an officer in 1994, drawn on the Kerala Cadre. His first post was assistant superintendent of Police in the Adoor and Kasaragod sub-divisions. After being promoted in 1998, he was posted in Pathanamthitta district and Kollam district. He was subsequently transferred to Kannur for four years, and then to Kerala Police Headquarters as Assistant Inspector General of Police. He worked for seven years as the Commissioner of Police for Cochin and Thiruvananthapuram. He is the emeritus head of Kerala Police Cyberdome.

== Awards and recognitions ==
Abraham has received awards for community policing initiatives and traffic reforms:

Year	Category	Institution or publication	Result	Notes	Ref.
2009	Vocational Excellence Award	Rotary International			
2009	International Community Policing Award	International Association of Chiefs of Police, USA	Won		
2010	Significant Achievement Award	Rotary International	Won	Notes	
2011	Man of the Decade Award	People's Forum of Kochi	Won	For effective crime control and successful management of law and order in Kochi.	
2011	Police Medal for meritorious service.	Law enforcement in India	Won	By the Indian President	
2020	Technology Leadership award	Kerala Management Association	Won	By the Indian President	

== Published works ==
- In 2012, Abraham co-edited the book Global Community Policing - Problems and Prospects, published by CRC Press. ISBN 9781439884164
