= Angamaly police firing =

1959 police shooting in Kerala, India

The Angamaly Firing was an incident that took place in Angamaly, Kerala, on 13 June 1959, when police opened fire on protesters who had been demonstrating against Kerala's communist government. Seven people were killed resulting in the intensification of Vimochana Samaram, a protest against the then communist-led government.

== Background ==
In 1957, a communist government was elected in Kerala for the first time under the leadership of E. M. S. Namboodiripad. Subsequently, a revolt propagated against the government. At Angamaly, the prime centre of Kerala Saint Thomas Christians, the intensity of fury was broke into open violence. On 13 June, Saturday, 1959 police mindlessly opened fire on an innocent mob. The innocent mob was fired upon without provocation, yet police killed 7 people in cold blood. But, the version of Communist government was different, saying that the police was forced to open fire on what they claim was a violent mob, who allegedly attempted to attack the police station.

== Aftermath ==
On the next day - Sunday, 14 June - the dead bodies were taken to the nearby town of Kalady, accompanied by a huge crowd. The bodies of the victims were taken out in a motorcade comprising more than 300 cars and buried at the cemetery of the St. George Syro-Malabar Catholic Forane Church, Angamaly in a common tomb. This event enraged the people of Kerala and intensified the Vimochana Samaram.The then Ernakulam bishop Mar Joseph Parecattil led the funeral rites.

Later addressing a massive gathering, the champions of Liberation struggle like Panampilly Govinda Menon, Wellington, and Mathai Manjooran unleashed a tirade against the EMS Ministry, which led to its downfall Following this, the EMS government was dismissed and the state placed under President's rule, pending elections.

The Communist Party was routed in the re-election that followed. The popular slogan- "Angamali kallarayil, njangade sawdharaanakkil, aa kallarayanu kattayyam, pakaram njangal choodikkum"; had then reverberated throughout the state.

The Forane church and its cemetery had for a short period turned into a pilgrim centre of the Liberation struggle activists and became the point from where the ‘jeevasikha’ march, had been led by the legendary Mannath Padmanabhan which culminated in the expulsion of the EMS ministry.

== Commemoration ==
The fiftieth anniversary of the firing was observed with a ceremony at the St. George Syro-Malabar Catholic Forane Church in Angamaly on 14 June 2009. Among the attendees were survivors of the incident, some of whom had been injured or imprisoned in its aftermath. Prayers were said over the graves of the seven victims.
