= Alexander Parambithara =

Indian politician

Speaker at Kerala Legislative Assembly
- In office 13 December 1961 – 10 September 1964

Personal details
- Born: February 1900
- Died: 10 June 1989 (aged 89)
- Party: Indian National Congress, Syndicate

Alexander Parambithara was the speaker of Kerala Legislative Assembly from 13 December 1961 to 10 September 1964.

He was born in February 1900. He did his education from Maharaja’s College, Ernakulam, St. Josephs’ College, Thiruchirappally and Law College, Trivandrum. After successfully completing the training course at Saidapet Teachers' College, Parambithara started his career as the Headmaster of St. Peters High School, Kumbalangi. He then stepped into politics. He died on 10 June 1989.

== Political life ==
Alexander Parambithara entered politics by getting elected to the Kochi Legislative Assembly. He was elected for two terms, from 1935–38 and 1948-49. He then became the member of Travancore Cochin Legislative Assembly from 1949-56. From 1947-1957 he was also a member of Ernakulam Municipal Council. He was the chairman of the Municipal Council from 1947-51. After the formation of Kerala State, he was elected to Kerala Legislative Assembly from Palluruthy Assembly constituency. Both in first Kerala Legislative Assembly (1957–59) and in Second Kerala Legislative Assembly (1960–64) he represented Palluruthy Assembly constituency. It was in his second tenure in Kerala Legislative Assembly he was made the speaker of the house. In the fourth Kerala Legislative Assembly election (1965–67) he again got elected but now from Eranamkulam Assembly Constituency. During this tenure, he made contributions the house as the chairman of Assurances Committee (1967–68) and Library Advisory Committee (1969–70) respectively. He openly contested the imposition of Emergency by Indira Gandhi in 1975 and joined hands with the communist leader AK Gopalan for agitational politics during this time. He was even courted arrested in this period. Opposing the politics of Indira Gandhi in Congress, he joined syndicate and contested against the Congress Candidate Henry Austin and CPI(M) candidate V Vishwanathan Menon in Parliament election. This attempt became unsuccessful as Henry Austin won by 50.23% vote share.

In his memory, Alexander Parambithara Bridge was commissioned which connects Thevara-Willingdon Island road to the BOT Bridge at Thoppumpady.
