= V. E. Abdul Gafoor =

Indian politician

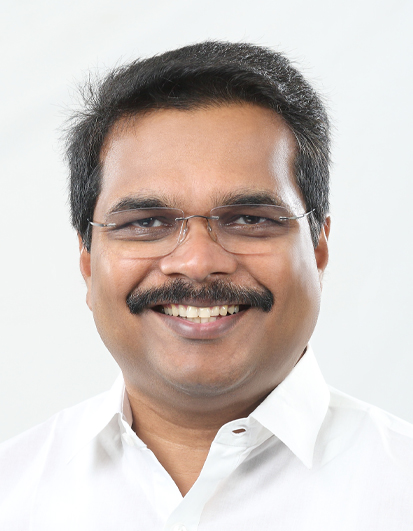

Minister for Fisheries and Social Justice Government of Kerala
- Incumbent
- Assumed office 18 May 2026
- Governor: Rajendra Vishwanath Arlekar
- Chief Minister: V. D. Satheesan
- Departments: Fisheries; Harbour Engineering; Social Justice
- Preceded by: Saji Cherian (Fisheries); R. Bindu (Social Justice)

Member of the Kerala Legislative Assembly
- Incumbent
- Assumed office 4 May 2026
- Preceded by: P. Rajeeve
- Constituency: Kalamassery

Personal details
- Born: (Age 49) Aluva, Ernakulam, Kerala
- Party: Indian Union Muslim League
- Children: NIL
- Parent: Late V. K. Ebrahimkunju (Father)
- Occupation: Advocate, politician
- Profession: Lawyer

Valiyaparambil Ebrahimkunju Abdul Gafoor is an Indian politician from Kerala. He is a member of the Kerala Legislative Assembly from the Kalamassery constituency representing the Indian Union Muslim League (IUML). He was elected in the 2026 Kerala Legislative Assembly election. He was sworn in as a minister for fisheries and social justice in the Government of Kerala on 18 May 2026 under the ministry headed by V. D. Satheesan.

== Political career ==
Abdul Gafoor is associated with the Indian Union Muslim League and has been active in politics in Ernakulam district. He contested from Kalamassery constituency in the 2021 Kerala Legislative Assembly election, where he finished as runner-up to P. Rajeeve.

In the 2026 Kerala Legislative Assembly election, he defeated incumbent minister P. Rajeeve by a margin of more than 16,000 votes.

Following the formation of the UDF government in Kerala, he took oath as minister on 18 May 2026.

== Personal life ==
Abdul Gafoor is an advocate by profession and practices law in Kerala. He is the son of former Kerala minister V. K. Ebrahimkunju.
