= V. K. Ebrahimkunju =

Indian politician (1952–2026)

Ebrahim Kunju
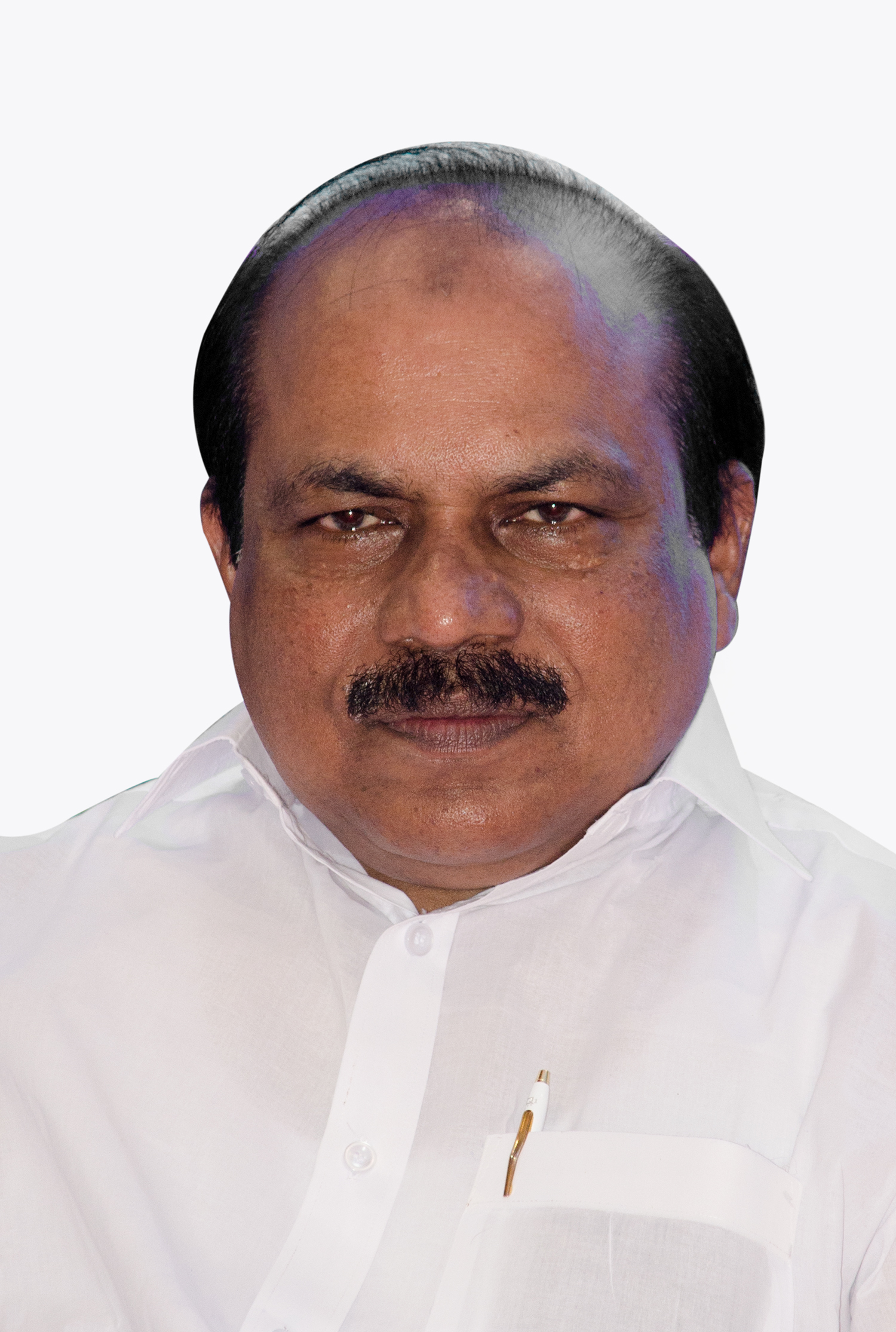

Minister for Public Works
- In office 18 May 2011 – 20 May 2016
- Chief Minister: Oommen Chandy
- Preceded by: M. Vijayakumar
- Succeeded by: G. Sudhakaran

Minister for Industries and Social Welfare
- In office 2005–2006
- Chief Minister: Oommen Chandy
- Preceded by: P. K. Kunhalikutty
- Succeeded by: Elamaram Kareem

Member of Kerala Legislative Assembly
- In office 2011–2021
- Constituency: Kalamassery
- In office 2001–2011
- Constituency: Mattancherry

Personal details
- Born: 20 May 1952 Kongorpilly, Koonammavu, Cochin, India
- Died: 6 January 2026 (aged 73) Ernakulam, Kerala, India
- Party: Indian Union Muslim League
- Children: V. E. Abdul Gafoor, Abbas, Anwar

Valiyaparambil Khader Ebrahim Kunju (20 May 1952 – 6 January 2026) was an Indian politician, who was the Minister for Public Works of the Government of Kerala. He represented the Kalamassery constituency in Kerala from 2011 to 2021.

== Background ==
V. K. Ebrahim Kunju was born at Kongorpilly, Aluva on 20 May 1952, to V. U. Khader and Chithumma. His wife was Nadeera and they had three children Adv. Abdul Gafoor, Abbas and Anoob. He qualified 10th standard in schooling. His son V. E. Abdul Gafoor contested from Kalamassery Constituency to the Kerala Legislative Assembly in the 2021 polls.

== Political career ==
Ebrahimkunju was the Minister for Industry and Social Welfare in the previous UDF Ministry. He entered politics through the Muslim Students Federation and the Muslim Youth League. He served as the chairman and chief executive of Forest Industries (Travancore) Ltd.

He was elected to the Kerala Legislative Assembly in the 2001, 2006, 2011 and 2016 elections. In the 2006 Kerala Legislative Assembly election, V. K. Ebrahim Kunju represented Mattancherry constituency after defeating M C Josephine of the CPI(M). In the 2016 Kerala Legislative Assembly election, Ebrahim Kunju represented Kalamassery assembly constituency.

Following the resignation of Muslim League leader, P.K. Kunhalikutty the then Minister for Industries on 4 January 2005, after the ice cream parlour sex scandal, V. K.Ebrahim Kunju was chosen to represent the party inside the UDF cabinet. Subsequently, he assumed office on 6 January 2005 as the Minister for Industries and Social Welfare. He became the Minister for Public Works from 23 May 2011 to 20 May 2016 in the second Oommen Chandy ministry.

In addition to his legislative responsibilities, V. K. Ebrahim Kunju worked in various organizations in Kerala.

Name of Organization	Designation
Kerala Muslim Educational Associations (KMEA)	Vice President
CH Mohammed Koya College of Engineering and Technology, Edathala	Chairman
Swathanthra Thozhilali union (STU), Eloor industrial Area	Chairman
Technical Employees Association TELK, Angamaly	Chairperson
Traco cables Staff and Workers Organisation, Irumpanam	Chairperson
KEL Employees Union, mamala	Chairperson
TCC Employees union, Udyogamandal	Chairperson
Thiruvalla Sugars Union	Chairperson
Cochin university of Science and Technology	Syndicate Member
Goshree islands Development Authority (G.I.D.A) member	Executive Committee
Al Manar Public School	Secretary
S.T.U	State Vice President
Officers Forum, TCC Employees union, Udyogamandal	President
Traco Employees Organisation, Thiruvalla	Chairperson
Binani Zinc Workers Federation General	Secretary
G.T.N Workers Association	Chairperson
District Board of the Kerala Grandhasala Sanghom, Ernakulam	District Development Council.
Committee on Government Assurances (constituted on 25 January 2019)	Chairman

=== Minister of Public Works ===
Ebrahimkunju was the Minister of Public Works during the period from 18 May 2011 to 20 May 2016. Oommen Chandy was the chief minister during the period.

==== Achievements ====
During the period, as per the list published by Oommen Chandy, 227 bridges worth Rs. 1600 crore were built across Kerala under the Ministership of Ebrahimkunju. Such huge development works are unprecedented and cover all districts of Kerala as listed below.

New Bridges in each District (2011–2016)
District	No. of Bridges	District	No. of Bridges
Trivandrum	9	Kollam	16
Pathanamthitta	17	Alapuzha	16
Kottayam	10	Ernakulam	28
Idukki	17	Trissur	9
Palakkad	12	Wayanad	9
Kozhikode	24	Kannur	20
Malappuram	20	kasaragod	16

A number of State Highways were constructed including all regions of the state under Second Chandy ministry, and the final decision to widen the National highways of the state to 45 m was taken in 2014.

== Illness and death ==
Ebrahimkunju was diagnosed with multiple myeloma in November 2020 and underwent chemotherapy. As per medical reports he needed further treatment. Doctors added that he had serious health issues and required continuous medical care.

Ebrahimkunju died at Lakeshore Hospital in Kochi, on 6 January 2026, at the age of 73. He had been undergoing treatment for multiple myeloma, heart failure and chronic kidney disease before his death. He had been admitted to hospital on 4 January following health-related complications, according to hospital authorities.

== Awards ==
Ebrahimkunju was awarded many accolades for his exemplary development works as Minister.

Name of Award	Awarder
Best Minister in Kerala State Cabinet 2012.	Deccan Chronicle (English Daily).
Best Minister of 2013.	Keli Kerala.
Minister of Excellence Award	International Road Federation, USA.
Global Road Achievement Award 2015	Indo American Press Club.
Kerala Ratna Puraskaram.	Keraleeyam U.K. Chapter of Global Kerala initiative.
Palakkad development Award.	Palakkad Development Samithy.

== Controversies ==
=== Palarivattom Flyover scam ===
- Ebrahimkunju was the 12th minister in the second Oommen Chandy ministry (2011–16) to be charged with graft by the Vigilance and Anti-Corruption Bureau. Both Enforcement Directorate (ED) and Kerala Vigilance and Anti-Corruption Bureau (VACB) are conducting investigation against V K Ebrahim Kunju in the alleged money laundering case and Palarivattom flyover corruption case.
- 5 February 2020: Kerala Governor Arif Mohammed Khan granted permission to prosecute former PWD minister and Muslim League leader VK Ebrahim Kunju MLA in the Palarivattom flyover scam.
- 29 February 2020: The vigilance and anti-corruption bureau interrogated V. K. Ebrahim Kunju.
- 9 March 2020: The Kerala Vigilance and Anti-Corruption Bureau conducted raids at the residence of V K Ebrahim Kunju in Kochi.

==== Money laundering ====
- 15 November 2019: The Kerala High Court ordered the Enforcement Directorate (ED) to investigate the case involving allegations of money laundering against former PWD minister VK Ebrahim Kunju. He was accused of depositing Rs 10 crores into the bank accounts of IUML's mouthpiece Chandrika when high-value currency notes of Rs 500 and Rs 1000 were banned by the central government in November 2016.
- 29 May 2020: Vigilance and Anti-Corruption Bureau interrogated V K Ebrahim Kunju in connection with money laundering case. He entered into controversy after he offered Gireesh Babu, the complainant Rs 5 lakh to withdraw the complaint.

Assembly polls in Kerala will be held on 6 April as declared by Election Commission. Vigilance probe team plans to submit chargesheet before Kerala Assembly Polls.
