= P. K. Kunjachan =

Indian Communist politician

Member of Rajya sabha
- In office 22 August 1988 – 16 June 1991
- In office 22 April 1973 – 21 April 1979
- Constituency: Kerala

Member of the Travancore-Cochin Legislative Assembly
- In office 15 February 1954 – 27 February 1957
- Constituency: Chengannur

Member of the Kerala Legislative Assembly
- In office 3 March 1967 – 26 June 1970
- Succeeded by: Damodaran Kalassery
- Constituency: Pandalam
- In office 16 March 1957 – 10 September 1964
- Succeeded by: G. Gopinathan Pillai
- Constituency: Mavelikkara

Personal details
- Born: October 1925 Ezhumattoor, Travancore, British India
- Died: 14 June 1991 (aged 65–66)
- Party: Communist Party of India; Communist Party of India (Marxist)
- Spouse: Bhasura Devi
- Children: 2, including P. K. Jamila
- Relatives: A. K. Balan (Son-in-law)

P. K. Kunjachan (October 1925 – 14 June 1991) was a Communist Party of India (Marxist) politician from Kerala, India. Before formation of Kerala state he was a member of the Tirukochi Legislative Assembly during the period 1954-1956. After formation of the state, he represented the Mavelikara constituency in the first and second Kerala Legislative Assemblies and the Pandalam constituency in the Third Legislative Assembly. Kunjachan was a member of Rajya Sabha from 1973–79 and 1988-91.

== Biography ==
P. K. Kunjachan was born in October 1925 at Ezhumattoor in present day Tiruvalla Taluk in Pathanamthitta district. He was born in a poor Scheduled Caste family. He became a member of the Communist Party of India in 1947. In 1973, he became the State General Secretary of the Agricultural Workers Union and remained in that position till 1982. He was active in trade union activities in the early days and became the leader of Travancore transport workers. When he got a job in a paper mill, upper caste workers, who thought it was bad to work under a lower caste, gave him poison in his stew, but he did not drink it, and his life was saved.

Before formation of Kerala state Kunjachan was elected the member of Travancore–Cochin Legislative Assembly during the period 1954-1956. After formation of the state, he represented the Mavelikara constituency in the first and in Pandalam constituency in second Kerala Legislative Assemblies as a Communist Party of India (CPI) candidate. After the split of Communist party in 1964, he stayed with Communist Party of India (Marxist) (CPI (M)) and represented Pandalam constituency in the Third Kerala Legislative Assembly. In 1971 general elections, in Adoor constituency, with the support of Indian National Congress, Bhargavi Thankappan of CPI beat Kunjachan who contested as a CPI (M) candidate. Kunjachan was then elected as the member of Rajya Sabha from 1973–79 and 1988-91.

Kunjachan has also worked as a member of the state secretariat of CPI (M), a member of the central committee, a member of the State Housing Development Corporation and the general secretary of the All India Farmers' Union. Kunjachan, who was involved in the freedom struggle, also served as a clerk in the army.

In 2018, at a meeting on Kunjachan's 28th death anniversary, the then Kerala Chief Minister Pinarayi Vijayan reminisced Kunjachan as an architect of the farmers' movement in the state of Kerala. He added, although it was not easy to organize workers in those feudal times, Kunjachan did not rest until he secured equality and fair wages for the agricultural laborers, and his efforts instilled confidence among the working class.

=== Personal life and death ===
Kunjachan, who was assigned to create a Mahila Sangham (Women's Union) and bring women to the forefront, took the initiative to publish the poems of Bhasura Devi, who was elected the secretary of the Mahila Sangham in Chengannur. After that he told her about his love, and married her in 1957. Kunjachan and his wife Bhasura Devi who was a teacher have two children including Dr. P. K. Jameela. Jameela who joined Kerala Health Service as a doctor, retired as director of health department. His Son-in-law A. K. Balan is also a politician and former Kerala minister. He died on 14 June 1991.

== Works on P K Kunjachan ==
P K Kunjachan Bhasura Ormakal (Chitha Publications, ISBN 9789387842502) is a memoir written by Kunjachan's wife Bhasura Devi. This book is about PK Kunjachan's struggles in building the Communist Party and uniting the agricultural workers. It also narrates his love story with Bhasura Devi, who was a member of an ancient Nair family in Chengannur, who left her home to live with Kunjachan, a Scheduled Caste.

Chentharakam (literally meaning "Red star") is a documentary on life of P. K. Kunjachan, directed by Pramod Payyannur.
