= Kalamassery Assembly constituency =

Kerala Legislative Assembly constituency

Kalamassery
- Constituency No. 77 for the Kerala Legislative Assembly

Constituency details
- Country: India
- Region: South India
- State: Kerala
- District: Ernakulam
- Established: 2008
- Total electors: 1,93,343 (2021)
- Reservation: None

Member of Legislative Assembly
- 16th Kerala Legislative Assembly
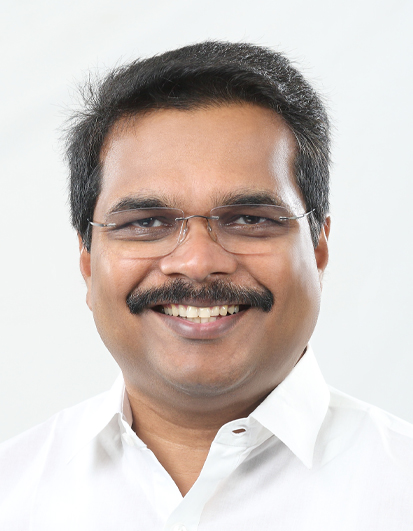
- Incumbent V. E. Abdul Gafoor
- Party: Indian Union Muslim League
- Elected year: 2026

Kalamassery State assembly constituency is one of the 140 state legislative assembly constituencies in Kerala in southern India. It is also one of the seven state legislative assembly constituencies included in Ernakulam Lok Sabha constituency. As of the 2026 assembly elections, the current MLA is Abdul Gafoor.

The assembly has a major public sector undertaking (Fertilisers and Chemicals Travancore), two major industrial estates and more than 500 small and medium scale enterprises.

== Local self-governed segments ==
Kalamassery Assembly constituency is composed of the following local self-governed segments:

Sl no.	Name	Status (Grama panchayat/Municipality)	Taluk
1	Kalamassery	Municipality	Kanayannur
2	Eloor	Municipality	Paravur
3	Alangad	Grama panchayat	Paravur
4	Kadungalloor	Grama panchayat	Paravur
5	Karumalloor	Grama panchayat	Paravur
6	Kunnukara	Grama panchayat	Paravur

== Members of the Legislative Assembly ==
The following list contains all members of Kerala Legislative Assembly who have represented Kalamassery Assembly constituency during the period of various assemblies:

Key

IUML CPI(M)

Election	Niyama Sabha	Member	Party
2011	13th	V. K. Ebrahimkunju	Indian Union Muslim League
2016	14th	V. K. Ebrahimkunju	Indian Union Muslim League
2021	15th	P. Rajeev	Communist Party of India
2026	15th	V. E. Abdul Gafoor	Indian Union Muslim League

== Election results ==
Percentage change (±%) denotes the change in the number of votes from the immediate previous election.

=== 2026 ===
2026 Kerala Legislative Assembly election: Kalamassery
Party	Candidate	Votes	%	±%
IUML	V. E. Abdul Gafoor	80,606	49.35	
CPI(M)	P. Rajeev	64,294	39.36	
BDJS	M. P. Binu	14,130	8.65	
AAP	Shamsu T. K.	553	0.34	
NOTA	None of the above	1,319	0.81	
Margin of victory		16,312		
Turnout		1,63,345		
IUML gain from CPI(M)		Swing		

=== 2021 ===
There were 2,01,707 registered voters in Kalamassery Assembly constituency for the 2021 Kerala Assembly election.

2021 Kerala Legislative Assembly election: Kalamassery
Party	Candidate	Votes	%	±%
CPI(M)	P. Rajeev	77,141	49.49%	▲11.94
IUML	V. E. Abdul Gafoor	61,805	39.65%	▼4.72
BDJS	P. S. Jayaraj	11,179	7.17%	▼8.48
SDPI	V. M. Faizal	2,385	1.53%	▲0.43
NOTA	None of the above	1,518	0.97%	−
BSP	P. S. Unnikrishnan	857	0.55%	−
Independent	P. M. K. Bava	526	0.34%	−
Independent	Nayana Unnikrishnan	452	0.29%	−
Margin of victory		15,336	9.84%	▲3.02
Turnout		1,55,863	77.27%	▲4.02
CPI(M) gain from IUML		Swing	▲11.94	

=== 2016 ===
There were 1,90,530 registered voters in Kalamassery Assembly constituency for the 2016 Kerala Assembly election.

2016 Kerala Legislative Assembly election: Kalamassery
Party	Candidate	Votes	%	±%
IUML	V. K. Ebrahimkunju	68,726	44.37%	▼3.37
CPI(M)	A. M. Yousaf	56,608	37.55%	▼4.26
BDJS	V. Gopakumar	24,244	15.65%	
SDPI	Safeer Muhammed	1,706	1.10%	▼0.50
WPOI	Prema G. Pisharady	1,391	0.90%	−
NOTA	None of the above	1,081	0.70%	−
PDP	V. M. Aliyar	634	0.41%	−
Independent	Unnikrishnan N. A.	182	0.12	−
Independent	Yussuf Kodoppilly	155	0.10	−
Independent	P. K .Yousli Pathalakkodath	155	0.10	−
Margin of victory		12,118	6.82%	▲0.90
Turnout		1,54,882	81.29%	▲1.54
IUML hold		Swing	▼3.37	

=== 2011 ===
There were 1,65,107 registered voters in the constituency for the 2011 election.

2011 Kerala Legislative Assembly election: Kalamassery
Party	Candidate	Votes	%	±%
IUML	V. K. Ebrahimkunju	62,843	47.73%	
CPI(M)	K. Chandran Pillai	55,054	41.81%	
BJP	P. Krishnadas	8,438	6.41%	
SDPI	P. A. Muhammed Aslam	2,104	1.60%	
Independent	T. A. Mujeeb Rahman	1,236	0.94%	
Independent	Chandrasekhara Pillai	657	0.50%	
BSP	Gireesh Babu G.	508	0.30%	
Independent	Shibu Thattampadi	505	0.38%	
AIADMK	D. Sundara Moorthy	186	0.14%	
Independent	K. P. Mohanan	145	0.11%	
Margin of victory		7,789	5.92%	
Turnout		1,31,676	79.75%	
IUML win (new seat)				

== See also ==
- Kalamassery
- Ernakulam district
- List of constituencies of the Kerala Legislative Assembly
- 2016 Kerala Legislative Assembly election
