= Department of Vigilance (Kerala) =

Administrative department of Kerala, India

Vigilance Department

Department overview
- Jurisdiction: Government of Keralam
- Headquarters: Government Secretariat, Thiruvananthapuram
- Minister responsible: Ramesh Chennithala, Minister for Vigilance
- Department executive: Minhaj Alam I.A.S. ACS, Secretary to Government
- Child Department: Vigilance and Anti-Corruption Bureau (VACB)
- Website: vigilance.kerala.gov.in

The Vigilance Department is an administrative department of the Government of Kerala responsible for vigilance and the prevention of corruption in public administration. The portfolio is generally held by the Chief Minister or the Minister for Home. The incumbent Minister for Vigilance is Ramesh Chennithala. The department is headquartered at the Government Secretariat in Thiruvananthapuram.

== Leadership ==
The Vigilance Department is headed politically by the Minister for Vigilance, who is responsible for the department's overall policy direction.

The administrative head of the department is the Additional Chief Secretary (Vigilance) to Government, an IAS Officer, who oversees its day-to-day administration.

The vigilance portfolio is commonly held by the Chief Minister or by a senior cabinet minister who also holds the Home portfolio. The incumbent vigilance minister is Ramesh Chennithala.

== Functions ==
The Vigilance Department oversees vigilance and anti-corruption activities across all government departments in the state.

The department also supervises the functioning of the Vigilance and Anti-Corruption Bureau (VACB), the state's principal anti-corruption investigation agency, and the Internal Vigilance Cells of government departments.

The major functions and jurisdiction of the department is as follows:

- All cases of corruption including cases of complaints or allegations against public servants.
- Issuing orders for prosecution, suspension and disciplinary proceedings against public servants following vigilance enquiries, in accordance with applicable laws and rules.
- Establishment matters of the Vigilance and Anti-corruption Bureau.
- Establishment of the Enquiry Commissioner and Special Judge and his staff.
- Administration and enforcement of Kerala Public Men (Prevention of Corruption) Act, 1983 and Kerala Public Servants (Inquiries) Act, 1963.
- Prevention of Corruption Act, 1988.

== See also ==
- Vigilance and Anti-Corruption Bureau, Kerala
- Department of Home (Kerala)
