= Vigilance and Anti-Corruption Bureau =

Anti-corruption agency in Kerala, India

Vigilance and Anti-Corruption Bureau, Kerala
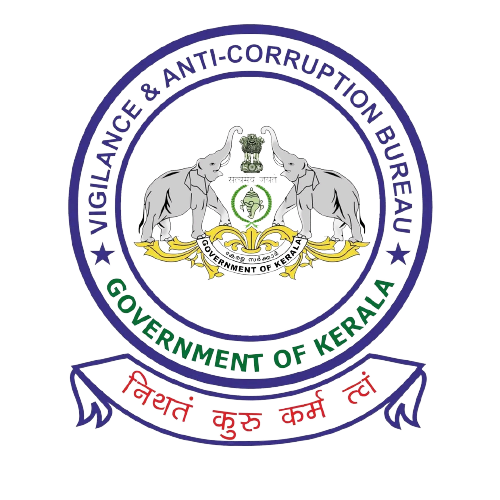
- Logo of Kerala VACB

Agency overview
- Formed: 1964
- Jurisdiction: Government of Kerala, under the Prevention of Corruption Act, 1988
- Headquarters: PMG, Vikas Bhavan P.O, Thiruvananthapuram, Kerala-695033
- Motto: नियतं करु कुरु कर्म त्वं | "Corruption, a crime against the nation."
- Annual budget: ₹170.7925 crore (US$18 million) (2026–27 Budget Estimate)
- Minister responsible: Ramesh Chennithala, Minister for Home and Vigilance
- Agency executive: Manoj Abraham, IPS, Director
- Parent department: Vigilance Department, Government of Kerala
- Website: https://vigilance.kerala.gov.in

Vigilance and Anti-Corruption Bureau, Kerala (VACB) is an agency of Government of Kerala constituted to investigate offences of bribery and corruption falling within the purview of Prevention of Corruption Act, 1988 in the state of Kerala. The VACB was established in 1964 and functions under the administrative control of the Vigilance Department of the Government of Kerala. The VACB has its headquarters in Thiruvananthapuram, the capital city of Kerala, and has several regional offices across the state.

As the sole specialized agency in Kerala which investigates corruption offences, the Vigilance & Anti-Corruption Bureau ensures that offenders are brought to justice and it constantly and continuously strives to keep Kerala corruption-free. Ramesh Chennithala is the current Minister for Vigilance. Manoj Abraham IPS is the current Vigilance Director.

== History ==
The department is formerly known as Directorate of Vigilance Investigation.

== Organization ==
=== Vigilance Department ===
The Vigilance Department functions at the secretariat level and is in charge of organising vigilance administration and creating and monitoring anti-corruption policies. The vigilance department supervises the vigilance and anti-corruption bureau and other vigilance units of the Government of Kerala. The department is headed politically by the Minister for Vigilance and administratively by the Additional Chief Secretary to Government, a senior IAS Officer.

=== Directorate ===
The Vigilance & Anti-Corruption Bureau was established in 1964 as a separate department under the Administrative Control of a Director to deal exclusively with the investigation of corruption cases utilizing Police personnel deputed to it as its own executive Staff. The Vigilance & Anti-corruption Bureau is headed by the Director who is of the rank of Director General of Police (DGP). This position is also known as Vigilance Director. The current Vigilance Director is Sri Manoj Abraham, IPS, a DGP-ranked officer in the Kerala cadre. He has earlier worked in CBI and Enforcement Directorate and considered to be an expert in Financial Crimes Investigation The Vigilance & Anti-Corruption Bureau headquarters is located at Thiruvananthapuram City. The VACB Headquarters is the office of the Director, Vigilance & Anti-Corruption Bureau.

At the headquarters, The Vigilance Director is assisted by an Inspector General of Police (IGP). There are two Superintendents of Police (SPs) for administrative and intelligence affairs.

For the convenience of administration, the State of Kerala is divided into four ranges headed by a Superintendent of Police (SP). A range is a group of vigilance units. A range consists of three or more units. A range is further divided into units, There are fourteen VACB Units in 14 districts of Kerala. Each unit has jurisdiction over the respective revenue districts. Each unit is headed by an officer of the rank of Deputy Superintendent of Police (DySP). He/She is assisted by Inspectors of Police, Sub Inspectors of Police, Assistant Sub Inspectors, and Civil Police Officers.

The officers are drawn from the general executive cadre of the Kerala Police Department and serve in the bureau on deputation. They include officers at various ranks, such as CPOs, SCPOs, SIs, IPs and bring policing and investigative experience into anti-corruption operations. The senior officers, such as DySPs, SPs and above ranking officers are appointed by the Government from the IPS cadre or KPS cadre.

Organizational Structure of Vigilance and Anti-Corruption Bureau, Kerala
Range	Units Covered	Head of Unit	Supervising Officer
Southern Range (HQ: Thiruvananthapuram)	Thiruvananthapuram, Kollam, Pathanamthitta	Deputy Superintendent of Police (DySP)	Superintendent of Police (SP)
Eastern Range (HQ: Kottayam)	Kottayam, Idukki, Alappuzha	Deputy Superintendent of Police (DySP)	Superintendent of Police (SP)
Central Range (HQ: Ernakulam)	Ernakulam, Thrissur, Palakkad	Deputy Superintendent of Police (DySP)	Superintendent of Police (SP)
Northern Range (HQ: Kozhikode)	Kozhikode, Malappuram, Wayanad, Kannur, Kasaragod	Deputy Superintendent of Police (DySP)	Superintendent of Police (SP)

Special Units of Vigilance and Anti-Corruption Bureau
Unit Name	Focus Area	Head of Unit	Supervising Officer
Special Investigation Unit-I (SIU 1)	High-profile and sensitive corruption cases.	Superintendent of Police (SP), SIU-I	IGP/Director
Special Investigation Unit-II (SIU 2)	High-profile and sensitive corruption cases.	Superintendent of Police (SP), SIU-II	IGP/Director
Special Cells (Thiruvananthapuram, Ernakulam and Kozhikode)	Investigation of Vigilance Cases relating to the amassment of disproportionate assets or the Confidential Verification of information. Statewide jurisdiction	Superintendent of Police (SP)	IGP/Director
Intelligence Cell (HQ: Directorate, Thiruvananthapuram)	Intelligence gathering on corrupt officials/corruption, Internal vigilance, source development	Superintendent of Police (SP) (Intelligence)	IGP / Director
Cyber Cell and Cyber Forensic Lab	Digital forensics, cyber surveillance, electronic evidence handling	Inspector / DySP (Cyber)	IGP/Director
Legal Wing	Prosecution, Legal scrutiny, coordination with prosecution, court matters.	Additional Director of Prosecution (Vigilance) assisted by Legal Advisors and Public Prosecutors.	Director

=== Hierarchy ===
- Director, VACB
- Inspector general of police, Vigilance
- Superintendent of Police, VACB
- Deputy Superintendent of Police, VACB
- Inspector of Police, VACB
- Sub Inspector of Police, VACB
- Assistant Sub Inspector, VACB
- Sr. Civil Police Officer
- Civil Police Officer

== Functions ==
The primary function of the VACB is to investigate corruption and malpractices in government departments, public sector undertakings, and local self-government institutions in Kerala. The VACB receives complaints from the public and also initiates suo-motu inquiries based on media reports or other sources of information. The VACB investigates cases of bribery, embezzlement, misuse of public funds, abuse of power, and other acts of corruption committed by state government employees or by central government employees in the state.

The VACB also conducts preventive measures to prevent corruption and malpractices in government institutions. The VACB conducts surprise inspections and raids on government offices and also conducts awareness programs for government officials and the general public on the harmful effects of corruption.

The VACB conducts Investigations/Enquiries into the following types of allegations involving Government Servants and Public Servants including those working in the Public Sector Undertakings of the State Government.

- Criminal misconduct of Public Servants as defined in PC Act 1988.
- Dishonest or improper conduct or abuse of power by Public Servants.
- Gross dereliction of duty or negligence.
- Misappropriation of public funds.
- Amassment of wealth disproportionate to the known sources of income.
- Misuse of Public money or property.
- Preventive vigilance actions and activities.

apart from this the bureau also conducts Vigilance Enquiries, Quick Verifications, Confidential Verifications and Surprise Checks. The bureau also collects intelligence reports on corrupt officials and maintains their records. The VACB launched WhatsApp portal for reporting corruptions and complaints. The WhatsApp number is 9447789100.

== Notable cases ==
- Bar bribery scam
- Palarivattom Flyover Scam
- Palmolein Oil Import Scam

== Courts and Tribunals ==
The VACB files cases against the accused in special courts and tribunals set up exclusively to handle corruption-related cases. These courts and tribunals are commonly known as Vigilance Courts or Special Courts.

There are several Vigilance Courts and Tribunals in Kerala that are empowered to hear and dispose of corruption cases. These courts and tribunals are established under the Kerala Lok Ayukta Act, 1999, and the Prevention of Corruption Act, 1988.

Special Judge (Vigilance), Thiruvananthapuram: This court has jurisdiction over cases registered by the VACB in Thiruvananthapuram district.

Special Judge (Vigilance), Ernakulam: This court has jurisdiction over cases registered by the VACB in Ernakulam district.

Special Judge (Vigilance), Kozhikode: This court has jurisdiction over cases registered by the VACB in Kozhikode district.

Special Judge (Vigilance), Thrissur: This court has jurisdiction over cases registered by the VACB in Thrissur district.

Special Judge (Vigilance), Kannur: This court has jurisdiction over cases registered by the VACB in Kannur district.

Special Court for Corruption Cases, Kochi: This court has jurisdiction over cases registered by the VACB in the Kochi City Police Commissionerate area.

Vigilance Tribunal, Thiruvananthapuram: This tribunal hears appeals against the orders of the VACB regarding departmental proceedings against government officials.

Apart from these courts and tribunals, the VACB also has the power to file cases against elected representatives in the High Court of Kerala, as per the directions of the Lok Ayukta. The Lok Ayukta is an independent ombudsman appointed by the state government to investigate cases of corruption against public officials. In conclusion, the Vigilance Courts and Tribunals in Kerala play a crucial role in ensuring that corrupt officials are brought to justice. These courts and tribunals provide a speedy and effective mechanism to deal with corruption cases, and their establishment is a significant step towards promoting transparency and accountability in government institutions.

== Initiatives ==
The VACB has set up a toll-free number "1064" for the public to report corruption, mismanagement, nepotism and bribery by government officials. Apart from that, a system has been set-up to report corruption on WhatsApp and website;- http://publicvigil.in

- Operation "JASOOS"

The VACB has conducted flash raids at 53 Regional Transport Offices as part of ‘Operation Jasoos’.

== Controversies ==
The VACB has faced criticism for its slow pace of investigation and lack of coordination with other law enforcement agencies. The VACB has also been accused of selective targeting of individuals and political bias in its investigations.

== Former chiefs ==
- MR Ajith Kumar IPS
- Anil Kant IPS
- B. Syed Mohammed Yasin IPS
- Loknath behra IPS
- Jacob Thomas IPS
- TP. Senkumar IPS
- Jacob Punnoose IPS

== See also ==
- Government of Kerala
- Kerala Lokayukta
- Kerala Lok Adalat
- Corruption in Kerala
- Prevention of Corruption Act, 1988
- Crime Branch
