= Palmolein Oil import scam =

The Palmolein Import Scam (Palmolein Case, Palmolein Corruption Case, 1991–92) refers to the alleged irregularities in the import of palm olein by the K. Karunakaran-led United Democratic Front government of the state of Kerala, India through the Power and Energy Limited Company. The Kerala government selected Power and Energy Limited arbitrarily without inviting tenders, allegedly at an inflated price and at an excessive service charge and in violation of central and state government procedure.

The Palmolein import scam was first brought to light officially by a report of the Accountant-General of Kerala in July 1993, a Comptroller and Auditor General report in February 1994, and subsequently by a report of the Public Undertakings Committee of the Kerala Legislative Assembly in March 1996. After a Left government came to power in May 1996, a vigilance case was registered against Karunakaran and six others on 21 March 1997. Following an inquiry, a charge sheet was submitted to the Court of the Inquiry Commissioner and Special Judge, Trivandrum, on 23 March 2001. The case dragged on, with Karunakaran filing writ petitions and appeals before the Kerala High Court and the Supreme Court of India, raising the plea of bad faiths (mala fides) and eventually obtaining a stay order from the Supreme Court of India in August 2007. The appeal remained pending before the Supreme Court of India until Karunakaran's death in December 2010.

== Case ==
The government of Kerala decided to import 15,000 tonnes of palm oil from Power and Energy Ltd, a Malaysian company in Singapore, at a price higher than on the open market. The price of import was fixed to USD405 per tonne, while the international market price was USD392.25 per tonne. The import order was signed by P. J. Thomas, who was then Kerala's Food Secretary. The investigation agency's charge sheet says that this order caused a loss of more than 2.32 crores to the public finances.

The opposition cried foul in the import. A vigilance case was filed against K. Karunakaran and seven others, including Thomas. A Special Leave Petition by Karunakaran made the Supreme Court of India stay the proceedings against him. The court closed the proceedings entirely against Karunakaran after his death in December 2010. Thomas was bailed in 2003.

The case was reopened in March 2011. In August 2011, Oommen Chandy, as the then Finance Minister in Karunakaran's Cabinet and the Chief Minister of Kerala, was also added to the new investigation. The court asked the vigilance and anti-corruption bureau to submit its investigation report by 10 November 2011. Chandy was the 23rd witness in the case and had been well known as the leader of the inner-party campaign launched by the A. K. Antony group within the State Congress against Karunakaran, especially on the palmolein issue during the early 1990s, when the import deal first became a controversy.

=== Accused ===
- K. Karunakaran
- H. Musthafa, Former minister of food and civil supplies
- F T .H. Musthafa, a close associate of Karunakaran
- S. Padmakumar, Former Chief Secretary (who, along with Karunakaran, allegedly met the Singapore-based company representative in New Delhi and agreed informally on the deal as early as October 1991)
- Zacharia Mathew, Former Additional Chief Secretary
- Jiji Thomson, Former Managing Director of the Kerala State Civil Supplies Corporation
- Sivaramakrishnan, Director of P&E Pvt. Ltd
- P. J. Thomas

== Expulsion of Chief Vigilance Commissioner ==
A debate raged against Thomas heading the position as CVC and being accused in the case. On 3 February 2011, he was finally asked to quit by the Supreme Court on the grounds that he had a corruption case pending against him.

== Exoneration of Chandy ==
On 25 June 2013, the Kerala High Court exonerated Chandy. The verdict was in response to a petition, filed by CPI-M veteran V. S. Achuthanandan and former bureaucrat and legislator K.J. Alphonse, contesting a vigilance probe clean chit to Chandy in the 1999 case. The court dismissed a petition filed by CPI-M veteran V.S. Achuthanandan and former bureaucrat and legislator K.J. Alphonse.

On 16 February 2016, the Supreme Court rejected Achuthanandan's plea and said that he was just dragging the case to get political mileage. The judges said "It seems you (Achuthanandan) want to keep the matter pending to score points against each other. Are you trying to fish in troubled waters? We will not allow this gameplan to continue."
