= P. P. Ummer Koya =

Indian politician, freedom fighter, and educationalist

Minister For Public Works, Government of Kerala
- In office 08 October 1962 - 10 September 1964
- Preceded by: D. Damodaran Potti
- Succeeded by: T. K. Divakaran

Minister For Education, Government of Kerala
- In office 22 February 1960 - 26 September 1962
- Preceded by: Joseph Mundassery
- Succeeded by: R. Sankar

Member of Kerala Legislative Assembly
- In office 1960-1964
- Preceded by: P. P. Ummer Koya
- Succeeded by: M. Chadayan
- Constituency: Manjeri
- In office 1957-1959
- Preceded by: Constituency Established
- Succeeded by: P. P. Ummer Koya
- Constituency: Manjeri

Personal details
- Born: 1 July 1922
- Died: 1 September 2000 (aged 78)

Parappil Puthiyapurayil Ummer Kwaja (1 July 1922 – 1 September 2000) was an Indian politician, Gandhian, freedom fighter and educationist. He was the second Education Minister of Government of Kerala headed by Pattom Thanu Pillai. He also served as the Minister for Public Works in the government headed by R. Sankar.

== Political career ==
Born in Calicut, the young Ummer Koya entered public life as an activist of the Indian National Congress. He played a key role in building up the Indian National Congress in the Malabar region. He was appointed as the Malabar Youth Congress Convenor in 1952. Two years later, he was elected to the Madras Legislative Council. Ummer Koya contested 1960 elections as a Congress candidate from Manjeri constituency and was elected to the Kerala Legislative Assembly.

Koya held the portfolio of Education from February 1960 to September 1962, in the Ministry headed by Pattom Thanu Pillai. He also handled the portfolio of Public Works, in the Ministry headed by R. Sankar from September 1962 to September 1964. During his political career, he also served as the Vice President of Kerala Pradesh Congress Committee (KPCC) and also had a stint as a member of the Kerala Public Service Commission.

Along with K. Kelappan, M. P. Manmadhan, and M. K. Kumaran, Koya was actively involved in the campaign for prohibition.

== P.P. Ummer Koya Award ==
An award titled P.P. Ummer Koya Award has been instituted by P.P. Ummer Koya Foundation, Kozhikode in honour of him. The prominent winners of the award include, Justice P. K. Shamsudheen (2007), freedom fighter K. E. Mammen (2008), and noted social activist and environmentalist A. Achyuthan (2009).

The Kerala Legislative Assembly paid its homage to him on 21 December 2000.
