= K. C. George =

Indian politician

K.C. George

Minister for Food and Forests
- In office 1957 April 5 – 1959 July 31
- Preceded by: Position Established
- Succeeded by: E.P. Poulose
- Constituency: Mavelikara

Member of Parliament, Rajya sabha
- In office 1952–1954
- Constituency: Travancore–Cochin

Personal details
- Born: 13 January 1903 Kingdom of Travancore
- Died: 10 August 1986 (aged 83)
- Party: Communist Party of India

K.C. George (1903 – 1986) was an Indian communist leader from Alleppey, Kerala. He was one of the founding leaders of the Communist Party of India in Travancore and later served as Minister in the first E. M. S. ministry.

== Early life and education ==
George was born on 13 January 1903 to a Syrain Christian family in Alleppey in the erstwhile princely state of Travancore. He was educated at the University of Madras as well as the University of Lucknow and held a law degree.

== Political career ==
K. C. George entered politics through the Travancore State Congress. He was elected to the All India Congress Committee (AICC), while still a student. He was elected to the Trivandrum Municipal Council in 1934. Till 1938, he practiced law in the Travancore High Court. George joined the Communist Party in 1939. He was elected as the secretary of the Travancore provincial unit of the party in its foundational meeting held at Pandalam in 1942. K. C. George played a crucial role in organizing the workers and agricultural laborers in the Shertallai and Ambalapzha taluks of princely Travancore during the Punnapra-Vayalar uprising. He served as a member of Rajya Sabha from 1952 to 1954 representing the Travancore-Cochin state. He contested and won in 1957 Kerala Legislative Assembly election from Mavelikkara constituency. He was named the Minister for Food and Forests (5 April 1957 to 31 July 1959), when the First E. M. S. Namboodiripad ministry was formed. He is the author of Immortal Punnapra-Vayalar and Ente Jeevita Yatra. George died on 10 August 1986.

== Works ==
- Immortal Punnapra-Vayalar
- Ente Jeevita Yatra
