= K. Pankajakshan =

Indian politician (1928–2012)

K. Pankajakshan (25 January 1928 – 28 August 2012) was an Indian politician from Kerala, who was the general secretary of the Revolutionary Socialist Party. Previously he used to belong to the Kerala Socialist Party.

Pankajakshan represented the Trivandrum West constituency from 1971 for two terms and then Aryanad constituency for three terms starting from 1980 to 1991 in the Kerala Legislative Assembly. He defeated a Janata Party candidate in the 1980 election by 1286 votes, and again in 1982 and 1987. In 1991 he lost to Congress candidate G. Karthikeyan.

Pankajakshan served as the Minister for Public Works (1979–82) and also as the Minister for Labour (1987–91). Pankajakshan died on 28 August 2012 and he was All India General Secretary of RSP at that time.
