= Neelakantaru Pandarathil. N =

Indian politician

Member of the Kerala Legislative Assembly
- In office 1957–1963
- Constituency: Nedumangad

Personal details
- Born: 1912
- Died: 2007 (aged 94–95)

Neelakantaru Pandarathil. N ( 1912–2007) was an Indian politician and freedom fighter. He represented Nedumangad constituency in the first and second Kerala legislative assemblies. He was a member of Democratic Congress and got elected to the Travancore Cochin Assembly in the 1950 by-election. He later joined the Communist Party of India and participated in the freedom struggle. He was also associated with Travancore State Congress.
