= Roads and Bridges Development Corporation =

Roads and Bridges Development Corporation of Kerala Ltd
- Abbreviation: RBDCK
- Formation: 23 September 1999
- Type: Autonomous
- Purpose: Construction, maintenance and operation of roads and bridges in the state of Kerala, India.
- Headquarters: Kochi, Kerala
- Chairman: P. A. Mohammed Riyas, Minister Of Public Works
- Vice Chairman: K. Biju, IAS, Secretary of Public Works
- Key people: Shri. S. Suhas IAS (Managing Director)
- Parent organization: KeralaPWD
- Affiliations: Government of Kerala
- Website: RBDCK.com

Roads and Bridges Development Corporation of Kerala Ltd (RBDCK) is an autonomous body under the Government of Kerala which manages construction of roads and bridges in the state of Kerala, India. In contrast with the Kerala Public Works Department, RBDC is an autonomous body which mobilises its own fund for its operations. The public work minister is the Chairman of the company. The head office of RBDCK is at Kochi, with regional office at Thiruvananthapuram.

== History ==
RBDCK is a corporation established and fully owned by the Government of Kerala and has been incorporated as a limited company under the Companies Act 1956 on 23 September 1999. RBDCK mainly deals with the properties and assets comprising movables and immovable including land, road projects, railway over bridge projects, toll collection rights and works under construction. RBDCK is a company under the Public Works Department of Government of Kerala. Major functions of the Corporation are To construct, maintain, operate and manage Highways, Roads, Bypasses, Bridges, Over-bridges etc., entrusted to and vested with the Company by the Government of Kerala or any other Government/ Governmental agencies/ Organisations including improvement, strengthening and rehabilitation of road network identified as core network and to regulate and control the use of the roads vested in, or entrusted to it. To undertake construction and maintenance of such facilities for and on behalf of any Government, Governmental agencies and Organisations on Turn-Key, Build-Own-Transfer, Build-Own-Operate and Transfer or any other basis and to collect tolls, user charges and such other revenues for the use of such facilities from the public, Government and other agencies. To raise funds subject to the provisions of the Companies Act 2013 and Reserve Bank of India guidelines issued from time to time for construction, maintenance, improvement and operation of such facilities etc. or by market borrowing, issue of shares, debentures, bonds or by way of loans, grants and borrowings from Government, Financial institutions including International Financial institutions.

== See also ==
- Kerala Public Works Department
