= T. A. Majeed =

Indian politician

T. Abdul Majeed

Chief Whip in Kerala Legislative Assembly
- In office 1967-1977

First Minister for Public Works, Government of Kerala
- In office 5 April 1957 – 31 July 1959
- Chief Minister: E. M. S. Namboodiripad
- Preceded by: Office Established
- Succeeded by: D. Damodaran Potti

Member of the Kerala Legislative Assembly
- In office 1957–1959
- Preceded by: constituency established
- Succeeded by: K. Sivadasan
- Constituency: Varkala
- In office 1967–1980
- Preceded by: Shamsuddin
- Succeeded by: Varkala Radhakrishnan
- Constituency: Varkala

Member of the Travancore-Cochin Legislative Assembly
- In office 1952–1954

Personal details
- Born: 1921
- Died: 5 July 1980 (aged 58–59)
- Party: Communist Party of India
- Children: Nazeer, Nazim, Nazira, Thankam
- Profession: Politician, Journalist

T. Abdul Majeed (1921–5 July 1980) was an Indian politician and leader of the Communist Party of India from Kerala. He was the Minister for Public Works in the first Kerala ministry headed by E. M. S. Namboodiripad (5 April 1957 to 31 July 1959). He represented Varkala constituency in 1st, 3rd, 4th and 5th Kerala Legislative Assemblies. He was also a member of the Travancore-Cochin Legislative Assembly in 1952 and 1954. He was the Chief Whip of the various ruling coalitions in Kerala from 1967 to 1977, which included the Saptakakshi Munnani or the Seven-Party Alliance (1967 to 1969), the subsequent ruling coalition led by CPI (1969 to 1970) and the Aikya Munnani or United Front (1970 to 1977). He also worked in the editorial staff of Prabhatham, Malayala Rajiyam and Janayugom dailies. He had one son and three daughters-Nazeer, Nazim, Nazira and Thankam.
