= D. Damodaran Potti =

Indian politician

- ഡി. ദാമോദരൻ പോറ്റി

5th Speaker of the Kerala Legislative Assembly
- In office 15 March 1967 – 21 October 1970
- Preceded by: Alexander Parambithara
- Succeeded by: K. Moideenkutty Haji

Personal details
- Born: 27 April 1921 Kottarakkara, Kollam district
- Died: 15 November 2002 (aged 81)
- Spouse: P. V. Sreedevi Antharjanam
- Parent(s): K. Damodaran Potti (father) and Aryadevi (mother)

D. Damodaran Potti was an Indian politician who served as Speaker of the Kerala Legislative Assembly from 15 March 1967, to 21 October 1970 and Minister for Public Works during Sankar ministry.

== Personal life ==
He was born on 27 April 1921 in Kottarakkara. His parents were K. Damodaran Potti and Aryadevi. His married to P. V. Sreedevi Antharjanam and got one son and three daughter. He studied from St. Berchmans College and Government Arts College, Thiruvananthapuram and got bachelor's degree in law from Government Law College, Thiruvananthapuram. On 29 January 1970, he suspended five opposition members who attacked him. He died on 15 November 2002.
