= A. R. Menon =

Indian politician

Ambat Ravunni Menon (1886-1960), popularly known as Dr. A. R. Menon, was a politician and a doctor from Thrissur City in Kerala, India. He was the first Minister of Health in Kerala and the Chairman of Thrissur Municipality. He was the first MLA from Thrissur Assembly Constituency to Kerala Legislative Assembly in 1957.

== Life ==
Menon was born on 6 April 1886 in Chittur, then a part of the erstwhile Kingdom of Kochi and currently in Palakkad district. He completed school, college and medical education (MBBS from Madras medical college & FRCP from London) with high marks and worked in England as a surgeon for almost fourteen years, Menon returned to India during the time of Second World War and was active in social field even while continuing his practice as a doctor. The role played by Menon during Malabar Riot was highly appreciated in all sections of the society. He always kept his interest in people's interests from a young age.

He was a member of Cochin Legislative Assembly from 1925 to 1945. During this period, he was the Minister for Rural Development for five years. He also served as the Chairman of Thrissur and Palakkad municipalities. He was also a member of Madras University Senate and A.I.C.C. He was also the first minister in Independent India who resigned due to no-confidence motion.

Menon later resigned from Congress, and contested as an Independent candidate. After the formation of Travancore-Cochin state, he was elected to the Legislative Assembly in 1954. In the elections which followed the formation of the current Kerala state, he was elected from Thrissur constituency by defeating K. Karunakaran, then a Trade Union (INTUC) leader, who later grew up as a stalwart politician, and served as the Chief Minister of Kerala. He was one of the three Independent members in the first elected Communist Ministry in Asia headed by E. M. S. Namboothirippad, along with V. R. Krishna Iyer and Joseph Mundassery.

Menon was re-elected to the Legislative Assembly in the second Legislative Assembly elections in 1960 from the erstwhile Parali constituency. He died in office on 9 October 1960 aged 74 after multiple health issues. He was cremated with full state honours in his home premises.
