= K. P. Gopalan =

Indian freedom fighter and politician

Minister of Industries and Community Development, Government of Kerala
- In office April 5, 1957 – September 31, 1959
- Succeeded by: K. A. Damodara Menon

Member of the Madras Legislative Assembly
- In office 1952–1956
- Constituency: Payyannur

Member of the Kerala Legislative Assembly
- In office 1957–1959
- Constituency: Kannur-2

Personal details
- Born: 1908 Puthiyaparamba, Malabar District, British India
- Died: April 20, 1977 (aged 68–69)
- Party: Communist Party of India

Kotiyath P. Gopalan (1908-1977) was a Communist Party of India politician, minister, freedom fighter and trade unionist from Kerala, India. He was first elected to the Madras Legislative Assembly in 1952. During his term as a member of the Kerala Legislative Assembly, he was appointed the first Minister for Industries and Community Development of the state.

== Biography ==
K. P. Gopalan was born in 1908, in Puthiyaparamba in present-day Kannur district of Kerala. His parents were Mankil Kannan and Kotiyath Kalyani. He was educated at Chirakkal Rajas High School and Kannur Municipal High School.

He died on April 20, 1977.

== Career and activism ==
Gopalan, who was attracted to the Indian freedom struggle after his schooling, was a volunteer in the Salt Satyagraha march of 1930. He was arrested for the first time for participating in the Salt March held under the leadership of K. Kelappan. He started his political career as a member of Indian National Congress. While in Ballari prison, he came in contact with national leaders. From them he learned socialist ideas. He became an active member of the Abhinava Bharat Yuvasangham, formed in Kannur and existing in Kasaragod and Chirakkal taluks. He who was a member of the Socialist Group of the Indian National Congress, reached the Communist ideology through the Congress Socialist Party. Gopalan joined the Communist Party of India in the Parappuram Conference where left-wingers of the Congress Socialist Party joined the Communist Party, in 1939. Gopalan presided over the Parappuram Conference. During his political career, he spent more than 16 years in prison.

Gopalan had been active in the trade union movement since 1935. He along with Pamban Madhavan tried to organize the weavers in Kannur but failed. After that he actively participated in the Farook workers' strike along with P. Krishnapillai. As a trade unionist He also held several positions including president of Kerala Trade Union Congress and vice president of All India Motor Workers' Union.

After independence he was elected member of the Madras Legislative Assembly from Payyannur constituency, in 1952 general elections and served as the Deputy Leader of Opposition in that Assembly. In the 1957 general election, the first election after the formation of Kerala state, he contested and won from Kannur-2 constituency. He became the Minister of Industries in the First Namboodiripad ministry. When the Communist government was dissolved, he concentrated in political activism in Kannur, where he took over the leadership of the party-led evening newspaper Janamunnani. When the Communist Party of India split in 1964, he remained steadfast in the CPI, but later joined the CPI (M).

== Books on him ==
In 2021 Kerala Bhasha Institute published biography of Gopalan named K. P. Gopalam Jeevithavum Rashtreyavum which literally means 'K. P. Gopalan - Life and Politics'. In the introduction to the book, author dr. Chinthavila Murali describes that the book is about a visionary revolutionary who fought for the poor till the end of his life and lived as a poor man.
