= P. K. Chathan Master =

Indian politician (1920–1988)

P. Kavalan Chathan Master (1920—1988) was a Communist leader and the first Minister for Local Self Government and Dalits Welfare of the State of Kerala.

== Political life ==
P. K. Chathan Master was born as the son of Shri. Kavalan in 1920 and was the first Scheduled Caste minister of Kerala. He was the Minister for Local Self Government and Harijan Welfare of the State of Kerala in the 1957 EMS government.

Kerala Pulaya Maha Sabha, KPMS was established in 1970 under the leadership of P. K. Chathan Master. From 1974 to 1976 he served as the Chairman of the Committee on the Welfare of Scheduled Castes and Scheduled Tribes. During a long span of public life he had also served as the Vice Chairman of the Kerala Khadi and Village Industries Board and President of the Kerala Pulayar Mahasabha.

The Kuttamkulam struggle (Vazzhinadakkal Samaram) in 1946 was started as a protest against untouchability into the premises of the Kudalmanikyam temple in Irinjalakuda. The caste organizations like S N D P, Samastha Cochin Pulaya Mahasabha, the political parties like Kochi rajya prajamandalam, CPI and Beedi workers organizations protested against the untouchability.
