= Joseph Mundassery =

Indian politician (1903–1977)

First Minister of Education, Co-operation, Government of Kerala
- In office 04 April 1957-31 July 1959
- Preceded by: position established
- Succeeded by: P. P. Ummer Koya

Member of Kerala Legislative Assembly
- In office 1957-1959
- Constituency: Manalur

Personal details
- Born: 17 July 1903 Trichur, Kingdom of Cochin (present-day Kerala, India)
- Died: 25 October 1977 (aged 74)
- Occupation: Literary critic, politician, social reformer, educationalist

Joseph Mundassery (17 July 1903 – 25 October 1977) was a literary critic and Indian politician from Kerala state. He specialised in the Malayalam language and literature. In Kerala politics, he is remembered as the Education Minister who was behind the controversial Education Bill of the first EMS communist ministry of 1957.

== Early life ==
Joseph Mundassery was born in a Syrian Catholic at Kandasankadavu, Thrissur. After his schooling locally he took his bachelor's degree in Physics and later a master's degree in Sanskrit and Malayalam. Until 1952, he was the Head of the Department of Foreign Languages at St. Thomas College, Trichur.

Mundassery entered politics through the Kochi Prajamandalam and was elected as a Member of the Legislative Council (MLC) of the princely state of Cochin in 1948 from the constituency of Aranattukara. Later on, he became an MLC in the Travancore-Cochin Assembly in 1954, from Cherpu.

After the formation of the state of Kerala in 1956, he won the Assembly election in 1957, from Manalur, and went on to become Kerala's first Education Minister (1957–59) in the EMS Communist ministry. Finally, in 1970, he was elected as an MLA from Trichur constituency.

== A doyen of letters and a cultural leader ==
As a prominent figure in the field of Malayalam literary criticism, Mundassery was one among a well-known trio of Malayalam critics, the others being Kesari Balakrishna Pillai and M. P. Paul.

Through his controversial theory about Rooparbhadrata – formal excellence – Mundassery ushered in a new chapter of literary hermeneutics, which was unheard of in Malayalam until then. According to the theory, the proclaimed aim of the author would inevitably lead to intentional fallacy, and an author should be evaluated on more objective criteria like his role as a spokesman of his age.

He was the President of the Kerala Sahithya Parishad from 1965 to 1967, and an executive (and a founding) member of the Kerala Sahitya Akademi. He was also instrumental in establishing the Kerala Sangeetha Nataka Akademi.

== As an educationist ==
Mundassery's notability as an educationist rests partly on the reforms that he partially succeeded in bringing about in the educational sector in Kerala when he was the Education Minister. He authored the controversial Education Bill of the First communist ministry of Kerala. To a great extent, the proposed bill directly led to the snowballing of the Vimochana Samaram and the subsequent downfall of the E.M.S. Namboodiripad's first communist ministry in 1959.

As the Education Minister of the first democratically elected ministry of the newly formed State of Kerala, Mundassery was instrumental in the establishment and restructuring of some of the early universities and prime educational institutions of the state, having had experience as the Vice Chancellor of the Cochin University of Science and Technology.

Mundassery was the guru of many pupils at St. Thomas College, Trichur, among whom were some of the future leaders of Kerala such as C. Achutha Menon and Mathai Manjooran.

Mundassery died in 1977.

PROF. JOSEPH MUNDASSERY SMARAKA GOVT. HSS in KANDASSANKADAVU, Thrissur is named after him

== Books ==
- Literary criticism: Karuna Nirupanam (1939), Mattoli (1943), Anthareeksham (1944), Kavyapeetika (1945), Manadandham (1946), Prayanam (1947), Karinthiri (1951), Roopa Bhadratha (1951), Kalathinte Kannadi (1954), Puthiya Kazhchappadil (1955), Rajarajante Mattoli (1961), Natakantham Kavithwam (1962), Prabhaashanaavali (1967), Pashchathya Sahithya Sameeksha (1967), Nanayaathe Meen Pidikkamo (1967), Vayanashalayil (1949–69; in four parts), Asan Kavitha: Oru Patanam (1971), Vallathol Kavitha: Oru Patanam (1971)
- Poetry: Chinthamadhuri (1928)
- Short story: Randu Rajakumarimar (1938), Sammaanam (1943), Illapolice (1947), Kadaksham
- Novel: Professor (1948), Konthayil Ninnu Kurissilekku (1954), Parappurathu Vithacha Vithu (1966)
- Autobiography: Kozhinja Ilakal (in three parts) (1960, 1965, 1976)
- Biography: Maxim Gorky (1952), Budhiman Jeevikkunnu (1965)
- Essays: Viswaviharam (1934), Prabandha Deepika (1936), Matham Avideyum Ivideyum (1955), Pothuvidyabhyasam Enthu Engane (1961), Vyakthiyil Ninnu Pouranilekk (1962), Shastram Jeevithathil (1964), Upanyasa Deepika (1964)
- Travelogue: China Munnottu (1953), Otta Nottathil
- Miscellaneous: Neenda Kathukal (1956), Kristhvanukaranam (1936), Stuntukal (1956)
