= Communist Party of India – Kerala =

Communist Party of India, Kerala ഇന്ത്യൻ കമ്മ്യൂണിസ്റ്റ് പാർട്ടി – കേരളം
- Secretary: Binoy Viswam
- Headquarters: MN Smarakom, Thiruvananthapuram
- Newspaper: Janayugom
- Student wing: All India Students Federation (AISF Kerala)
- Youth wing: All India Youth Federation (AIYF Kerala)
- Women's wing: National Federation of Indian Women (NFIW Kerala)
- Labour wing: All India Trade Union Congress (AITUC Kerala)
- Ideology: Communism; Marxism–Leninism
- Political position: Left-wing
- ECI status: State Party
- Alliance: Left Democratic Front (Kerala)
- Seats in Rajya Sabha: 2 / 9 (Kerala)
- Seats in Lok Sabha: 0 / 20 (Kerala)
- Seats in Kerala Legislative Assembly: 08 / 140

Election symbol

Party flag

Website
- https://cpikerala.org/

The Communist Party of India, Kerala or CPI Kerala is the Kerala state unit of CPI. It organizes and coordinates party activities and campaigns within the state including selecting candidates for local, state, and national elections. The CPI is the second largest party in the opposition Left Democratic Front in the Kerala Legislative Assembly. The party has two Rajya Sabha members from the state. site

== History ==
=== Background ===
In July 1937, a clandestine meeting was held at Calicut. The five attendants of this meeting were P. Krishna Pillai, K. Damodaran, E.M.S. Namboodiripad, N. C. Sekhar and S.V. Ghate. The first four were members of the Congress Socialist Party (CSP) in Kerala. The latter, Ghate, was a CPI Central Committee member, who had arrived from Madras. The meeting formed the first cell of the Communist Party in Kerala, consisting the first four attendants.

The first conference of the Kerala provincial unit was organised two years later at Parappram, Pinarayi, in Kannur in December 1939. The entire Kerala unit of the Congress Socialist Party got converted into a unit of the CPI. Thus, the proper functioning of the Communist Party of India in Kerala among the people as a political party started in December 1939 with the Pinarayi Conference. Contacts between the CSP in Kerala and the CPI had begun as early as 1935. when P. Sundarayya, a Central Committee member of CPI, based in Madras at the time, met with E. M. S. Namboodiripad and Krishna Pillai. Sundarayya and Ghate visited Kerala at several times and met with the CSP leaders there. The contacts were facilitated through the national meetings of the Congress, CSP and All India Kisan Sabha.

By early the 1940s, active party cells were operating in the princely states of Travancore and Cochin. The Travancore state cell was established in a meeting held at Pandalam on 28 March 1942. The meeting elected K. C. George as the secretary. Further, a temporary committee consisting of M. N. Govindan Nair, P. T. Punnoose, K. V Pathrose and P. Krishna Pillai was also formed in the meeting. Pathrose later became the secretary of Travancore state cell and a major leader of Punnapra-Vayalar uprising. Similarly, C. Achuta Menon was secretary of the Cochin state cell.

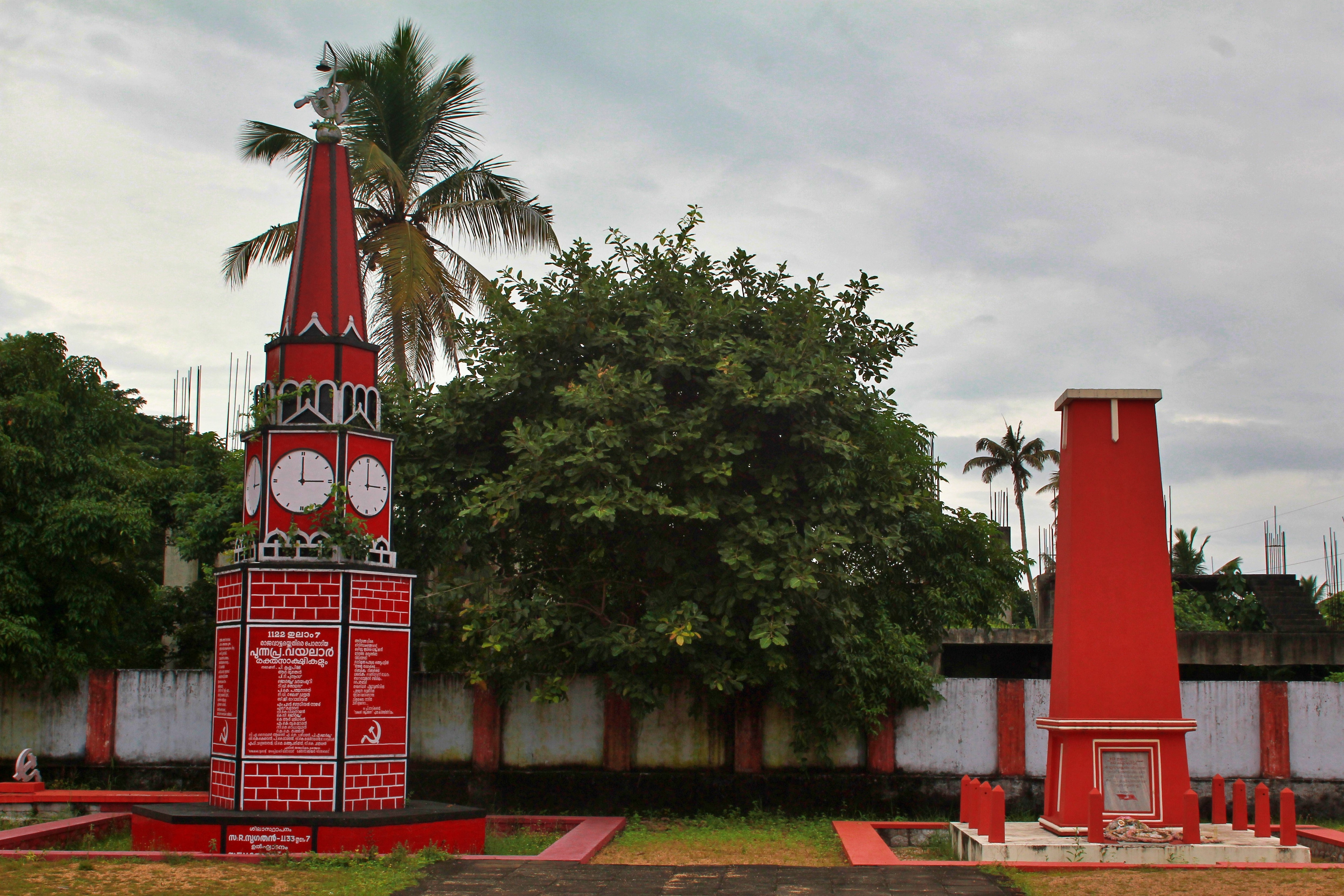
Punnapra-Vayalar uprising martyrs memorial at Vayalar

In October 1946, Punnapra-Vayalar uprising, a militant communist movement, erupted in the Princely State of Travancore, against the Diwan, C. P. Ramaswami Iyer and the state. The incident was largely caused by the prevailing famine conditions (1939–43) in which over 21,000 peasants died in Cherthala taluk alone. The Travancore police police unleashed brutal violence upon the revolutionaries. Over 400 people were killed. After the killings, many people around the areas turned into communists.

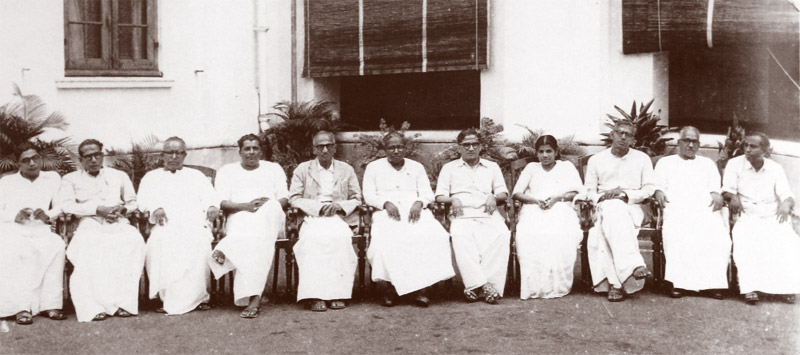
First EMS Ministry

In 1957 Kerala Assembly election the Communist Party of India (CPI) was elected to rule the state government of Kerala. A ministry was formed under the leadership of E. M. S. Namboodiripad. The EMS government was dismissed within two years and President's Rule was declared in 1959 following the Vimochana Samaram. In 1964, in conjunction with the widening rift between China and the Soviet Union, a large leftist faction of the CPI leadership, based predominantly in Kerala and West Bengal, split from the party to form the Communist Party of India (Marxist), or CPI (M). In Kerala, the CPI (M) and CPI in coalition with other parties wrested control from the Congress and its allies.

=== The 1964 Split ===
After the 1964 CPI split, many prominent leaders including C. Achutha Menon, T. V. Thomas and M. N. Govindan Nair remained within the party. Many others like E. M. S. Namboodiripad, A. K. Gopalan and K. R. Gouri Amma joined the newly formed Communist Party of India (Marxist). In the 1965 elections, an year after the split, the break-away faction CPI(M) emerged as the largest party in the assembly with 40 seats. CPI could win only 3 seats out of the 79 seats to which it fielded candidates. However, no single party could form a government commanding majority. Due to this reason, the election is largely considered abortive. President's rule was declared on the state for the fourth time.

=== United Front Government (1967–1969) ===
In the 1967 Kerala assembly election, both communist parties - CPI (M) and CPI - along with smaller parties including Samyukta Socialist Party and Muslim League contested as a United Front. A total of seven parties contested as part of the front, and it was widely known as the Saptakakshi Munnani. The CPI(M) led front won the election with a record 113 seats out of 133 seats and formed a government under E.M.S. Namboodiripad. After 2 years of the government, due to continuous problems between CPI and CPI(M), many ministers from the smaller parties resigned eventually, and many parties subsequently left the front. The government lost its majority and the Second Namboodiripad ministry was dissolved in 1969.

=== Mini Front Government (1969–1970) ===
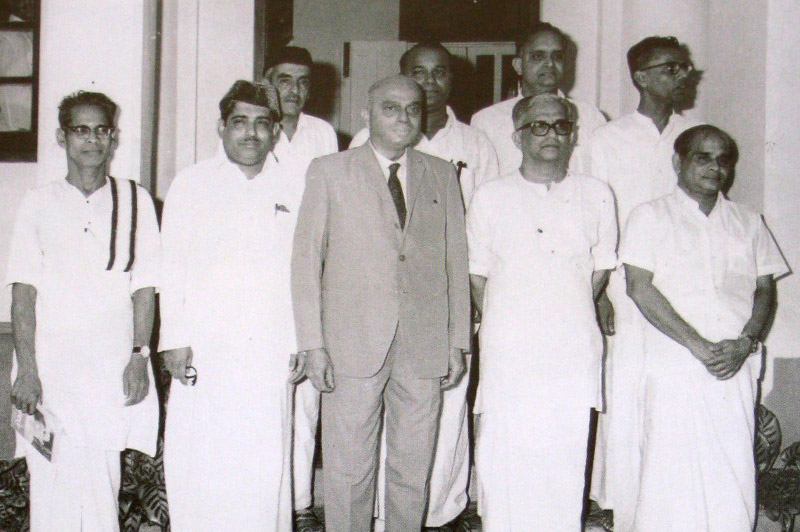
First Achutha Menon Government

Subsequently, CPI along with Muslim League, Revolutionary Socialist Party and Indian Socialist Party constituted a Mini Front which formed government with the external support from Indian National Congress. CPI leader C. Achutha Menon was sworn in as Chief Minister on 1 November 1969. But the split in Indian Socialist Party and group politics within the Congress party led to the fall of Achutha Menon government on 1 August 1970.

=== United Front (1970) ===
The party contested in the 1970 Assembly Election as part of the United Front. The alliance won 111 seats in the house of 140 (Congress–38, CPI–23, Kerala Congress–20, IUML–13, RSP–9, NDP–5, PSP–3). A government was formed on 4 October 1970 with C. Achutha Menon as the Chief Minister. Although Indian National Congress was part of United Front it did not join the ministry during the initial stage, but they extended support from outside. The Cabinet was expanded on two later occasions, when the Indian National Congress joined in September 1971, nominees of the Kerala Congress were inducted in December 1975.

=== Emergency rule in Kerala ===
Prime minister Indira Gandhi declared state of emergency in 1975 across India by citing internal and external threats to the country. This state of affairs lasted for a 21 month period from 1975 to 1977. This period is known as the 'Emergency' in India. During the emergency, the United Front led by CPI led the government in Kerala. Although the formal tenure of the government expired on 21 October 1975, the term was extended on three occasions over a six-month period due to the emergency. The government resorted to arbitrary arrests and detentions under the Maintenance of Internal Security Act to crush dissent.

Communists opposing the state repression organised political activities from different hide-outs in Kerala. Many members and leaders of the opposing CPI(M) including the former chief minister Pinarayi Vijayan were imprisoned. Back then, he was a member of the Kerala Legislative Assembly representing the Kuthuparamba constituency. Vijayan was tortured and held in custody for one and a half years by the police. After his release, Vijayan made an impassionate speech against senior Congress leader and then home minister K. Karunakaran in the assembly holding up the blood-stained shirt he wore in police custody. The event caused serious embarrassment to the then C. Achutha Menon government. Hundreds of communists, whether from the CPI(M), other Marxist parties, or the Naxalites, were arrested and tortured during the emergency. P. Rajan, a student of the Regional Engineering College, Calicut, was murdered in police custody at Kakkayam torture camp. The Rajan case created havoc across Kerala and put the government in serious trouble.

=== Formation of LDF (1979) ===
In the late 1970s and early 1980s, two main pre-poll political alliances were formed: the Left Democratic Front (LDF), led by the Communist Party of India (Marxist) and Communist Party of India and the United Democratic Front (UDF), led by the Indian National Congress. These pre-poll political alliances of Kerala have stabilized strongly in such a manner that, with rare exceptions, most of the coalition partners stick their loyalty to the respective alliances (Left Democratic Front or United Democratic Front).

=== Left Democratic Front (1980–present) ===
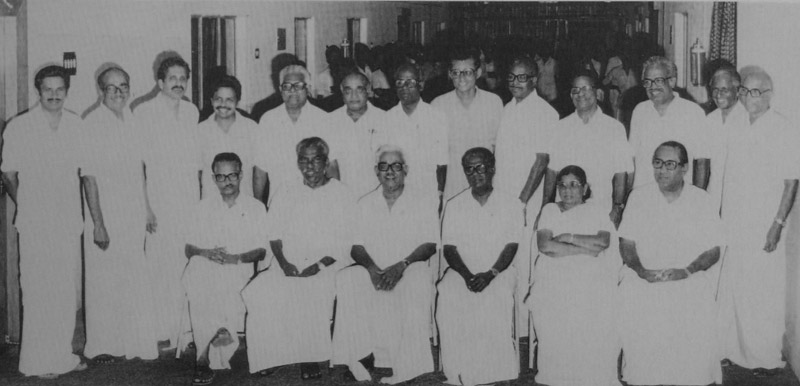
2nd Nayanar Ministry (1987)

LDF first came into power in 1980 election under the leadership of E. K. Nayanar sworn in as the Chief Minister of Kerala on 26 March 1980 for the first time in 1980. He formed government with the support of Congress (A) under A. K. Antony and Kerala Congress under K. M. Mani, Nayanar later became the longest serving Chief Minister of Kerala, ever since 1980 election, the power has been clearly alternating between the two alliances till the 2016. LDF has won 6 out of 10 elections since the formation of the alliance in 1980. Since 1980, none of alliances in Kerala has been re-elected till the 2016. The 1987, 1996 elections led E. K. Nayanar, and the 2006 elections led by V. S. Achuthanandan formed governments and completed their full terms but were not re-elected. In 2016, LDF won the 2016 election led by Pinarayi Vijayan and had a historic re-election in 2021 election where an incumbent government was re-elected for first time in 40 years. Pinarayi Vijayan from LDF is the first Chief minister of Kerala to be re-elected after completing a full term (five years) in office.

== Structure and Composition ==
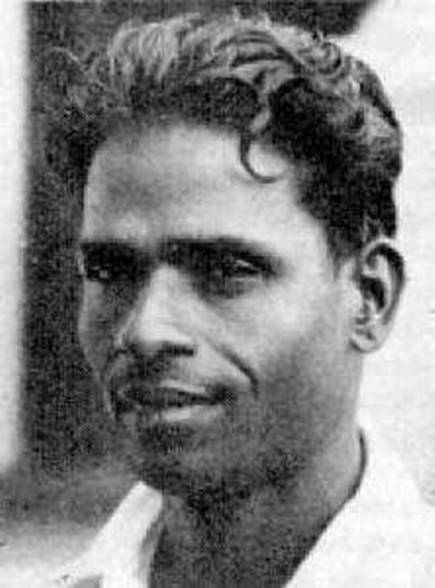
P. Krishna Pillai
Frist Secretary of CPI Kerala Unit

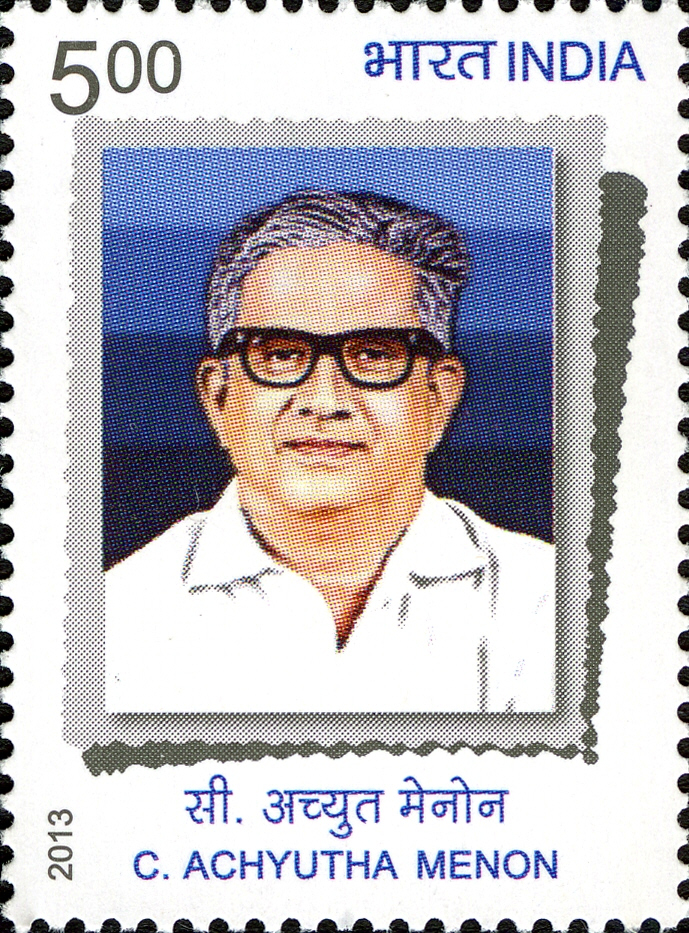
C Achutha Menon
4th Chief minister of Kerala

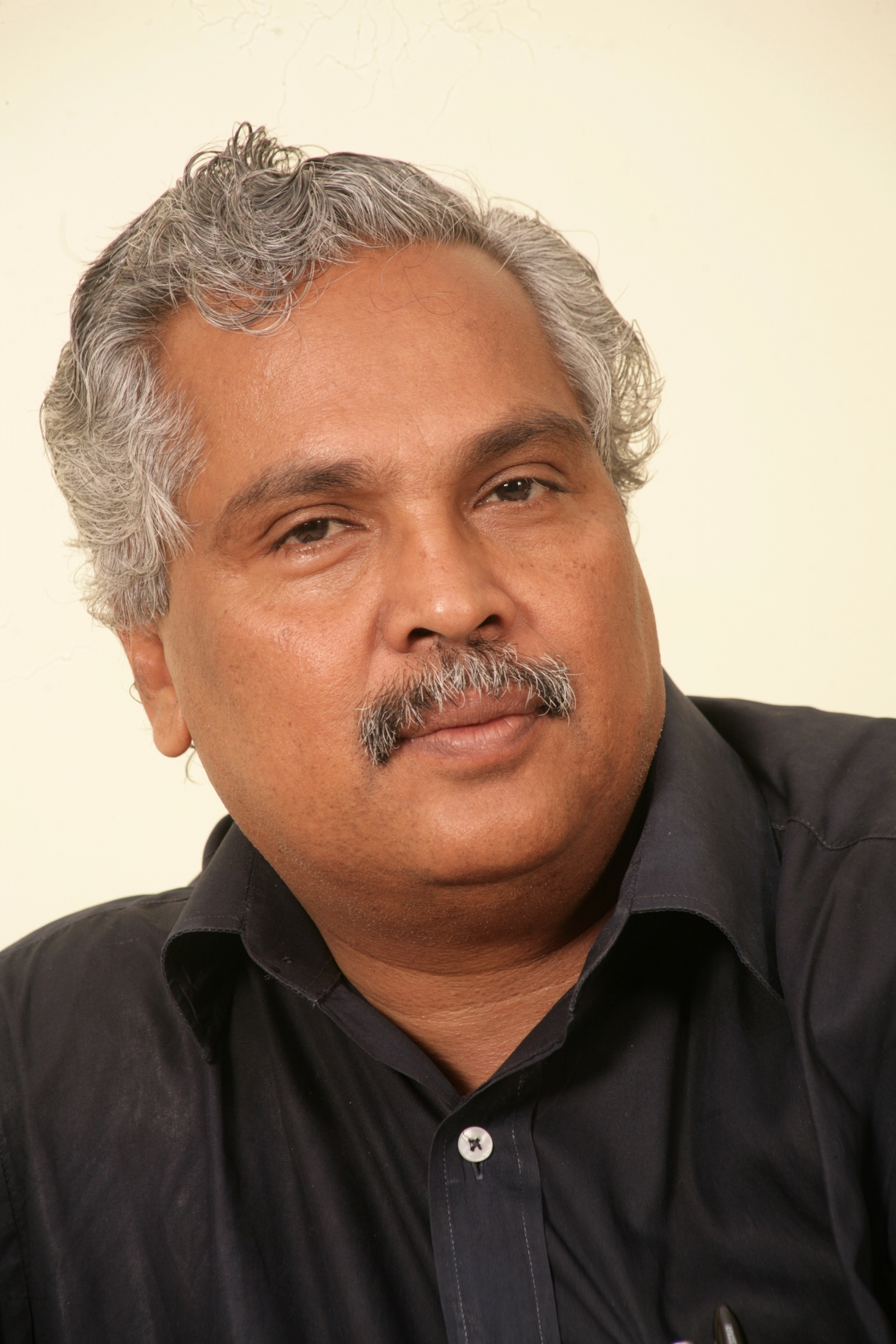
Binoy Viswam
Current State Secretary of CPI in Kerala

=== List of state secretaries of CPI Kerala ===
| No. | Portrait | Secretary (Birth–Death) | Term | Total Years as secretary |
|---|---|---|---|---|
| 1 | | P. Krishna Pillai (1906–1948) | 1942–1948 | 6 Years |
| 2 | | C. Achutha Menon (1913–1991) | 1949–1956 | 7 Years |
| 3 | | M. N. Govindan Nair (1910–1984) | 1956–1959 | 3 Years |
| 4 | | E. M. S. Namboodiripad (1909–1998) | 1959–1962 | 3 Years |
| 5 | | C. Achutha Menon (1913–1991) | 1962–1968 | 13 Years |
| 6 | | S. Kumaran (1923–1991) | 1968 – 1970 | 2 Years |
| 7 | | M. N. Govindan Nair (1910–1984) | 1970–1971 | 1 Year |
| 8 | | N. E. Balaram (1919–1994) | 1971 – 1984 | 13 Years |
| 9 | | P. K. Vasudevan Nair (1926–2005) | 1984–1998 | 14 Years |
| 10 | | Veliyam Bharghavan (1928–2013) | 1998– 2010 | 12 Years |
| 11 | | C. K. Chandrappan (1935–2012) | 14 November 2010 – 22 March 2012 | 1 year, 129 days |
| 12 | | Pannian Ravindran (1945–) | 10 April 2012 – 2 March 2015 | 2 years, 326 days |
| 13 | | Kanam Rajendran (1950–2023) | 2 March 2015 – 8 December 2023 | 8 years, 281 days |
| 14 | | Binoy Viswam (1955-) | 10 December 2023 - | Incumbent |

=== Current State Secretariat Leaders ===
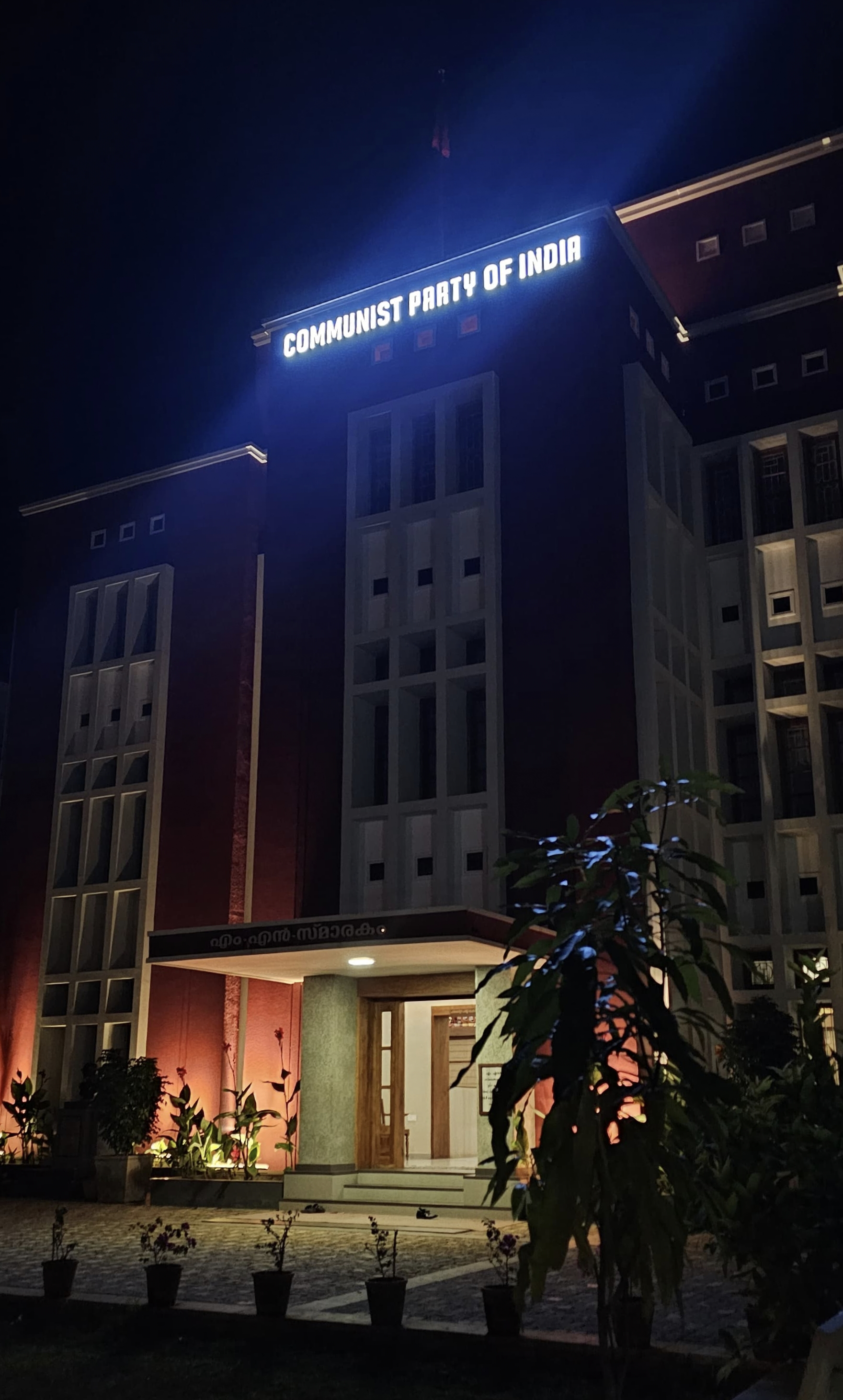
State Committee Office, Communist Party of India, Kerala

| No. | Leader's name | Born (Age) |
|---|---|---|
| 1 | Binoy Viswam (Secretary) | 25 November 1955 (age 70) |
| 2 | P. P. Suneer (Assistant Secretary) | 31 May 1968 (age 58) |
| 3 | Sathyan Mokeri (Assistant Secretary) | 2 October 1953 (age 72) |
| 4 | K. Rajan | 26 May 1973 (age 53) |
| 5 | G. R. Anil | 30 May 1963 (age 63) |
| 6 | P Prasad | 24 May 1969 (age 57) |
| 7 | J. Chinju Rani | 6 July 1962 (age 64) |
| 8 | R. Rajendran | |
| 9 | K. K. Valsaraj | |
| 10 | K. P. Suresh Raj | |
| 11 | K. K. Ashraf | |

=== Current State Executive Committee ===
| No. | Leader's name |
|---|---|
| 1 | Binoy Viswam |
| 2 | P. P. Suneer |
| 3 | Sathyan Mokeri |
| 4 | K. Rajan |
| 5 | G. R. Anil |
| 6 | P Prasad |
| 7 | J. Chinju Rani |
| 8 | R. Rajendran |
| 9 | K. K. Valsaraj |
| 10 | K. P. Suresh Raj |
| 11 | K. K. Ashraf |
| 12 | P Vasantham |
| 13 | Rajaji Mathew Thomas |
| 14 | Kamala Sadanandan |
| 15 | C. K. Sasidharan |
| 16 | Mullakkara Retnakaran |
| 17 | N. Rajan |
| 18 | Govindan Pallikkappil |
| 19 | C. N. Chandran |
| 20 | V. S. Sunil Kumar |
| 21 | K. M. Dinakaran |
| 22 | T. T. Jismon |
| 23 | T. J. Anjalose |
| 24 | Chittayam Gopakumar |
| 25 | C. P. Murali (Ex officio member) |

=== Principal mass organisations ===
| No. | Organisation Name | Association for | President |
|---|---|---|---|
| 1 | All India Youth Federation (AIYF) | Youth | K Shajahan |
| 2 | All India Students' Federation (AISF) | Students | Bibin Abraham |
| 3 | All India Trade Union Congress (AITUC) | Trade union | T. J. Anjalose |
| 4 | National Federation of Indian Women (NFIW) | Women | P. Vasantham |
| 5 | Bharatiya Khet Mazdoor Union (BKMU) | Agricultural Workers | Chittayam Gopakumar |

=== District Secretaries ===
| No. | District | District Secretary |
|---|---|---|
| 1 | Thiruvananthapuram | Mangode Radhakrishnan |
| 2 | Kollam | P. S. Supal |
| 3 | Alappuzha | S. Solomon |
| 4 | Pathanamthitta | Chittayam Gopakumar |
| 5 | Kottayam | V. K. Santhosh Kumar |
| 6 | Idukki | K. Salim Kumar |
| 7 | Ernakulam | N. Arun |
| 8 | Thrissur | K.G. Sivanandan |
| 9 | Palakkad | Sumalatha Mohandas |
| 10 | Malappuram | P. K. Krishnadas |
| 11 | Kozhikode | P. Gavas |
| 12 | Wayanad | E. J. Babu |
| 13 | Kannur | C.P. Santhosh Kumar |
| 14 | Kasaragod | C. P. Babu |

== List of Chief Ministers from CPI ==
| No. | Portrait | Name Ministry (Year) | Length of term | |
| No. | Portrait | Name Ministry (Year) | Longest continuous term | Total years of premiership |
|---|---|---|---|---|
| 1 | | E. M. S. Namboodiripad; 1st Namboodiripad (1957–1959) | 2 years, 240 days | 2 years, 240 days |
1964 split in the Communist Party of India
| 2 | | C. Achutha Menon; 1st Achuta Menon (1969–1979); 2nd Achuta Menon (1970–1977) | 6 years, 172 days | 6 years, 172 days |
| 3 | | P.K. Vasudevan Nair; PKV ministry (1978–1979) | 343 days | 343 days |

== Kerala Assembly election results ==
Kerala Assembly Election Results
| Year | Party State Secretary | Popular vote | % of overall votes | Total seats | seats won/ seats contensted | Change in seats | Outcome |
|---|---|---|---|---|---|---|---|
| 1957 | M. N. Govindan Nair | 20,59,547 | 35.28% | 126 | 60 / 101 | ▲ new | Government |
| 1960 | E. M. S. Namboodiripad | 3,171,732 | 39.14% | 126 | 29 / 108 | ▼20 | Opposition |
1964 split in the Communist Party of India
| 1965 | C. Achutha Menon | 525,456 | 8.3% | 133 | 03 / 79 | ▼28 | No Result |
| 1967 | C. Achutha Menon | 538,004 | 8.57% | 133 | 19 / 22 | ▲16 | Government |
| 1970 | S. Kumaran | 675,298 | 8.97% | 133 | 16 / 29 | ▼3 | Government |
| 1977 | N. E. Balaram | 872,309 | 9.94% | 140 | 23 / 27 | ▲7 | Government |
| 1980 | N. E. Balaram | 744,112 | 7.8% | 140 | 17 / 22 | ▼5 | Government |
| 1982 | N. E. Balaram | 804,869 | 8.42% | 140 | 13 / 25 | ▼4 | Opposition |
| 1987 | P. K. Vasudevan Nair | 1,029,409 | 8.08% | 140 | 16 / 25 | ▲3 | Government |
| 1991 | P. K. Vasudevan Nair | 1,170,499 | 8.26% | 140 | 12 / 24 | ▼4 | Opposition |
| 1996 | P. K. Vasudevan Nair | 10,86,350 | 7.62% | 140 | 18 / 22 | ▲6 | Government |
| 2001 | Veliyam Bharghavan | 1,212,248 | 7.7% | 140 | 7 / 24 | ▼11 | Opposition |
| 2006 | Veliyam Bharghavan | 1,257,422 | 8.09% | 140 | 17 / 24 | ▲10 | Government |
| 2011 | C. K. Chandrappan | 1,522,478 | 8.72% | 140 | 13 / 27 | ▼4 | Opposition |
| 2016 | Kanam Rajendran | 1,643,878 | 8.12% | 140 | 19 / 25 | ▲6 | Government |
| 2021 | Kanam Rajendran | 1,579,235 | 7.58% | 140 | 17 / 23 | ▼2 | Government |
| 2026 | Binoy Viswam | 14,34,524 | 6.64% | 140 | 8 / 24 | ▼9 | Opposition |

== List of Elected Members ==
=== Kerala Legislative Assembly ===
The CPI is the second largest party in the opposition LDF alliance in Kerala with 8 seats out of the 140 in the Kerala Niyamasabha.

| Sl.no | Constituency | Name of the elected MLA | Party affiliation |
|---|---|---|---|
Kasaragod district
| 1 | Kanhangad | Govindan Pallikappil | CPI |
Palakkad district
| 2 | Pattambi | Muhammed Muhsin | CPI |
Thrissur district
| 3 | Ollur | K. Rajan | CPI |
| 4 | Nattika | Geetha Gopi | CPI |
| 5 | Kaipamangalam | K. K. Valsaraj | CPI |
Alappuzha district
| 6 | Cherthala | P. Prasad | CPI |
Kollam district
| 7 | Punalur | Ajayaprasad C | CPI |
Thiruvananthapuram district
| 8 | Nedumangad | G. R. Anil | CPI |

=== Rajya Sabha ===
| # | Name | Party | Term start | Term end |
|---|---|---|---|---|
| 1 | P. Santhosh Kumar | CPI | 03-Apr-2022 | 03-Apr-2028 |
| 2 | P. P. Suneer | CPI | 02-Jul-2024 | 01-Jul-2030 |

== See also ==
- Politics in Kerala
- Left Democratic Front
- Communism in Kerala
- Communist Party of India (Marxist), Kerala
- Kerala Pradesh Congress Committee
