= Pinarayi Conference =

Founding conference in 1939

1st Conference of Communist Party of India in Kerala ഇന്ത്യൻ കമ്മ്യൂണിസ്റ്റ് പാർട്ടിയുടെ ആദ്യ കേരള പ്രവിശ്യ സമ്മേളനം
- Locations: Parapram, Pinarayi, Malabar District, British India (present-day Kerala, India)
- Participants: 42 delegates (approx.)
- Major events: Formal establishment of the Communist Party of India Kerala Provincial Unit
- Leader: P. Krishna Pillai

The Pinarayi Conference or Pinarayi-Parapram Conference was the 1st provincial conference of the Communist Party of India's Kerala unit. The conference held at Parapram in Pinarayi village in today's Kannur district in late December, 1939. The event established organised communist activities in present-day Kerala under the leadership of the Communist Party of India. The conference was held in great secrecy away from the eyes of the colonial government and state surveillance forces. The Pinarayi conference was organised owing to the efforts of a group of prominent freedom fighters who were earlier part of the Congress Socialist Party in Kerala.

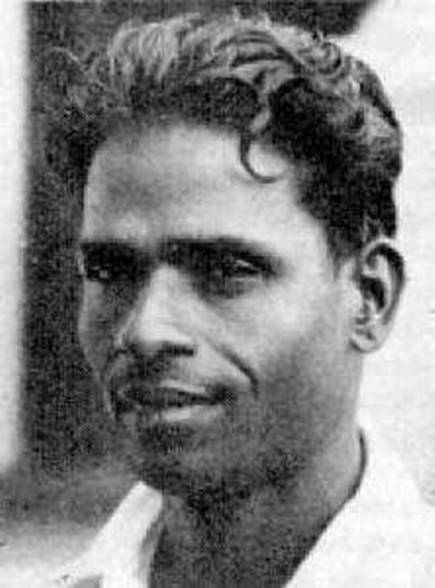
P. Krishna Pillai
First Secretary of CPI Kerala Provisional Unit

== Background ==
In July 1937, a clandestine meeting was held at Calicut. The five attendants of this meeting were P. Krishna Pillai, K. Damodaran, E.M.S. Namboodiripad, N. C. Sekhar and S.V. Ghate. The first four were members of the Congress Socialist Party (CSP) in Kerala. The latter, Ghate, was a CPI Central Committee member, who had arrived from Madras. The meeting formed the first cell of the Communist Party in Kerala, consisting the first four attendants.

The party activities in south India were overseen by Amir Haider Khan during its initial days. Khan worked in underground taking different names. He was arrested in Madras in 1934. Khan had connections in Kerala. The police found address details of a Tailor in Kannur from his diary leading to a C.I.D. investigation.

After, Khan's arrest, P. Sundarayya, a Central Committee member of CPI, based in Madras at the time, coordinated party activities in south India. He was in touch with Krishna Pillai and E. M. S. Namboodiripad since 1935. Krishna Pillai was a prominent Congressmen and the secretary of CSP's provincial unit in the early 1930s.

The Congress Socialists from Kerala met communist veterans of the Meerut Conspiracy Case like P. C. Joshi and S. A. Dange in the national conferences of the CSP. Later, in early 1937, all-India leadership of the communist party sent S. V. Ghatte, a Bombay communist, back then based in Madras, to Malabar. His mission was to link up with the leftists in the Kerala CSP. Sundrayya and Ghate visited Kerala several times and met with the CSP leaders. The contacts were further facilitated through the national meetings of the Congress, CSP and All India Kisan Sabha. These events culminated in the formation of the four member committee in Calicut in 1937.

Krishna Pillai and others met several radical Congressmen from Malabar in the two years between the formation of the four member committee in Calicut and the outbreak of the world war in 1939. They convinced and mobilised the support of other leftists in CSP for the formation of the communist party's provincial unit in Kerala.

== Formative meeting ==
Pinarayi is a village on the banks of the Anjarakandi River. The village is covered by the river on three sides. There was no major roadway nearby. The area was inaccessible to the police and its informers. Parapram was chosen as the location for the conference due to strategic advantages since it was an isolated area. An option for escape to Dharmadom by crossing the river was available if the authorities somehow found out about the event. Retreats to Mavilayi or Peralasseri via another route was the other possibilities for escape. Back then, from Thalassery, one had to reach Pinarayi via Nettoor and then travel further to Parapram. The conference was organised during night inside the Vivekananda Library. The whole event took place under the protection of Vadavathy Appukutty, a prominent village elder in Parapram.

Simultaneously, a meeting of Radical Teachers Union Was conducted at nearby RC Amala Basic Upper Primary School under the leadership of Pandyala Gopalan Master to divert the attention of the authorities and villagers. The conference was held with the backing of the activists of the Parapram Karshaka Sangham, the local unit of the All India Kisan Sabha (AIKS) which had by them became an important organization representing peasants and agricultural workers in Malabar.

The conference meeting was presided over by K. P. Gopalan. P. Krishna Pillai presented the political resolution. He asserted the necessity to choose communism as the path to fight imperialist forces and organize peasants from different parts of the country. Further, the conference selected Krishna Pillai as the first state secretary of the party in Kerala. A decision was made by the conference to form committees at the provincial, district and lower levels immediately, to conduct more campaign for the formation of party cells.

== Delegates ==
There is no record available containing all names of those who participated in the Parapram conference. The names are collected from the memoirs and articles of various communist leaders. Approximately 42 delegates participated in the conference.

1. P. Krishna Pillai
2. K. Damodaran
3. E. M. S. Namboodiripad
4. P. Narayanan Nair
5. K. K. Warrier
6. A. K. Gopalan
7. Vishnubharatheeyan
8. E. P. Gopalan
9. P. S. Namboodiri
10. C. H. Kanaran
11. K. A. Keraleeyan
12. Subrahmanian Thirumump
13. K. P. Gopalan
14. Chandroth Kunhiraman Nair
15. M. K. Kelu
16. Subrahmanya Shenoy
17. V. V. Kunhambu
18. William Stellex
19. A. V. Kunhambu
20. K. Kunhiraman Master
21. P. M. Krishnamenon
22. K. Krishnan Nair
23. Vadavathi Krishnan
24. N. E. Balaram
25. Pinarayi Krishnan Nair
26. K. N. Chathukkutty
27. Manjunatha Rao
28. Kongasseri Krishnan
29. K. P. R. Gopalan
30. P. V. Kunhunni Nair
31. Moyyarath Sankaran
32. P. K. Balakrishnan
33. Janardhana Shenoy
34. George Chadayammuri
35. P. Gangadharan
36. T. K. Raju
37. I. C. P. Namboodiri
38. P. P. Achyuthan Master
39. C. Kannan
40. M. Padmanabhan
41. T. V. Achyuthan Nair
42. K. Damu

== Aftermath ==
The formation of the Communist Party was made public through posters and wall writings all over North Kerala on January 26, 1940. Even though, the party functioned in secrecy, it is believed that the authorities were getting slight hints about its activities.

Communist cells were formed following the call given by the conference. Duties of these cells, consisting no more than five members, included protection of the party leaders, observing spies and transfer of secret messages. Gathering at night, smoking and the use of torch were forbidden. Each member was liable to protect and secure the party. The Party had played a major role in building a new era in the history of Kerala.

The party undertook serious campaigns against the Second World War. The war caused severe food shortage and price hikes in the erstwhile British Malabar, Cochin and Travancore. A public strike was organised against war in Malabar on 15th September 1940. Strong agitations against the war followed across the region under the banner of CPI. Agitations against imperialism and feudal exploitations took place in different parts of the state like Morazha, Kayyur, Karivellur, Kavumbay, Onchiyam, Thillangary, Anthikkad, Punnapra-Vayalar, etc. Clashes broke out between the people and police forces at numerous locations including Mattannur and Kuthuparamba. Curphews were imposed on almost sixteen places in Malabar. Thalassery Abu and Chattukutty became martyrs in police firing on party members. A police inspector was killed in the Morazha incident. K. P. R. Gopalan was charged and court was ordered to death sentence. Gopalan's death sentence was relieved due popular pressure. These incidents culminated in the strengthening of the communist movement in Kerala. The world's first elected communist government was thus formed in Kerala in 1957.

== See also ==
- Communist Consolidation
- Communist League (India, 1931)
- Kanpur Bolshevik Conspiracy case
- Meerut Conspiracy case
- Communist Party of India – Kerala
- Communist Party of India (Marxist) – Kerala
