= Communism in Kerala =

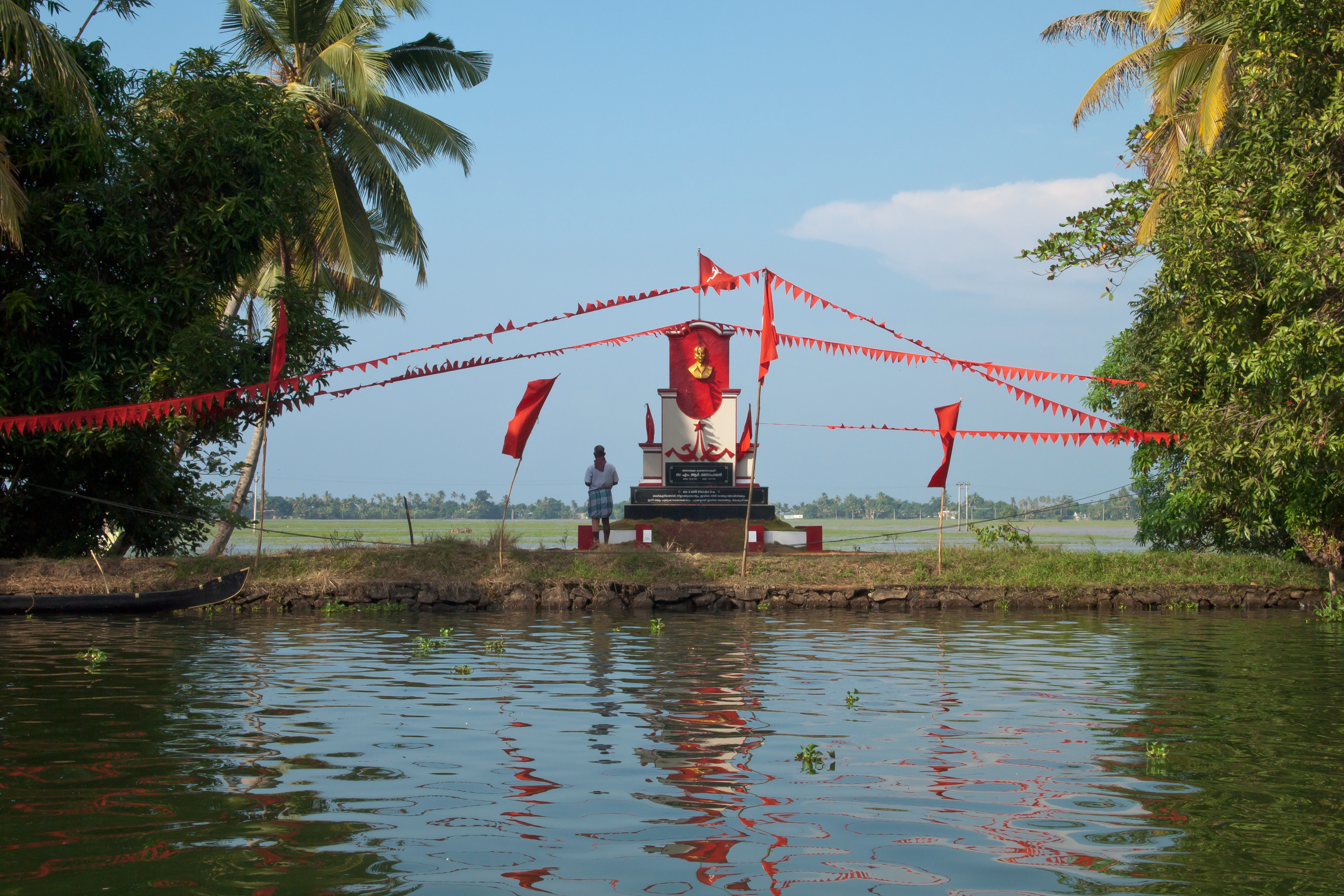
A monument in Kerala, India

Communist politics have a strong presence in the Indian state of Kerala. Today, the two communist parties in Kerala politics are the CPIM and the CPI, which, together with other left-wing parties, form the LDF alliance.

In addition to Kerala, the Indian states of West Bengal and Tripura have had multiple democratically elected Marxist governments, with legislation being debated by regular multiparty electoral processes. The communism of Kerala has fostered Indian communist stalwarts such as M. N. Govindan Nair, C. Achutha Menon, K. Damodaran, T. V. Thomas, N. E. Balaram, E. M. S. Namboodiripad, A. K. Gopalan, K. R. Gouri Amma, P. K. Vasudevan Nair and C. K. Chandrappan.

The communist Left Democratic Front is one of the two major political coalitions in Kerala, alongside the United Democratic Front. The alliances have alternately been in power for the last four decades until 2021, where the Left Democratic Front was re-elected as the ruling party for the first time. The coalition is led by the Communist Party of India (Marxist) and also comprises the Communist Party of India, Kerala Congress (M), Indian Socialist Janata Dal, Nationalist Congress Party (Sharadchandra Pawar), Kerala Congress (B) and the Indian National League.

== History ==
=== Formation of a socialist wing ===
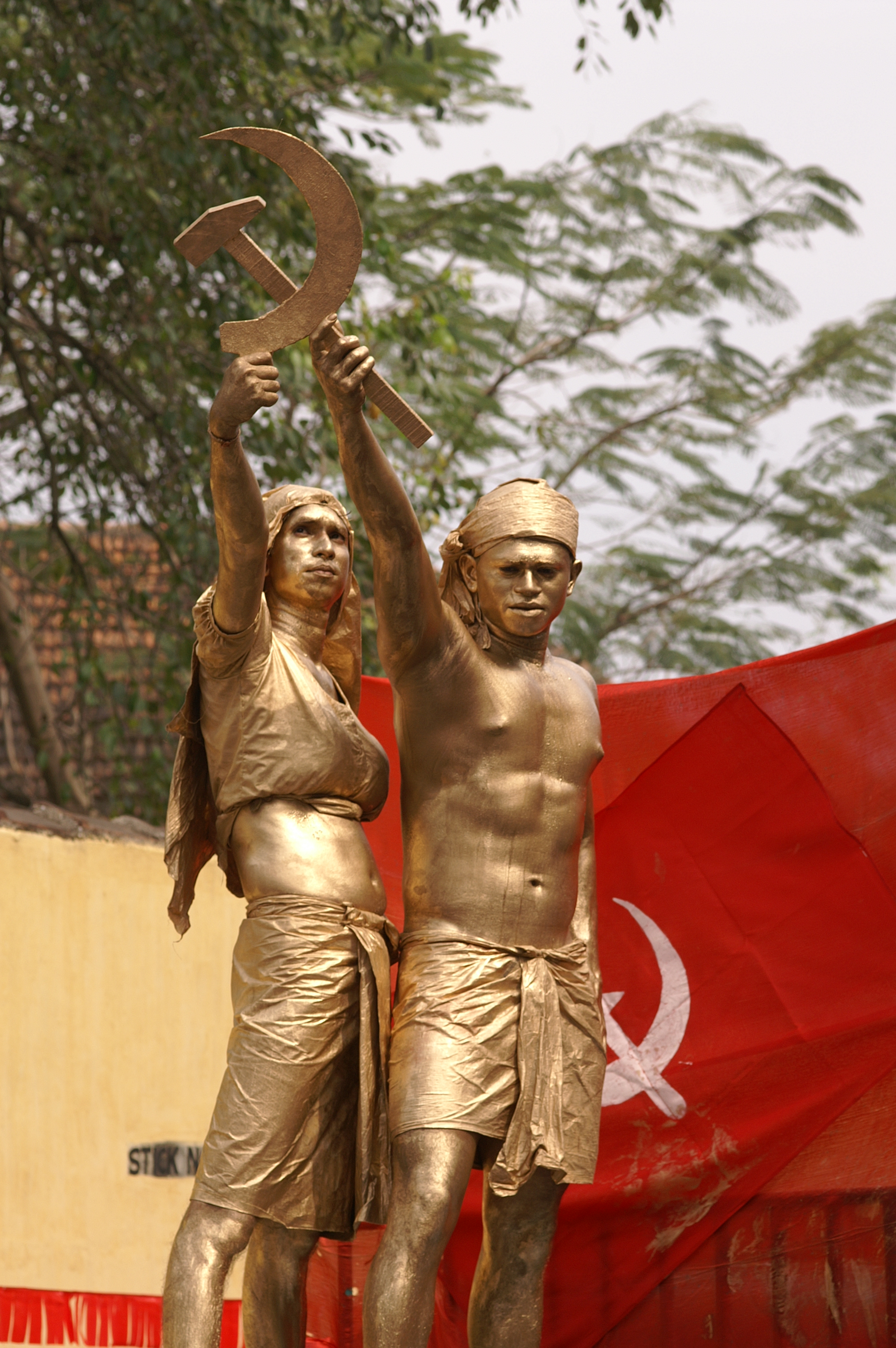
A tableau at a communist rally in Kerala, India, of a young farmer and worker.

From the 1920s to 1930s, peasants and workers became increasingly involved in the anti-colonial struggles in the Malabar district, Cochin Kingdom and Travancore Kingdom. These three regions would later constitute the Kerala state, along with some regions from South Kanara. The peasant and labour movements of the 1930s were, to a great extent, the cause as well as the consequence of the emergence of a powerful left wing in Indian politics. In 1934, the left anti-colonials joined and organised the Congress Socialist Party with C. K. Govindan Nair as Secretary within the Congress Party.

A powerful factor that helped the growth of the leftist movement was the support it received from the radical section of the anti-colonial native Muslims in Malabar. Leftist groups started functioning in several parts of Malabar. Soon, the Kerala Provincial Congress Committee (KPCC) was dominated by them.

By 1938 to 1939, the Malabar district, Cochin Kingdom and Travancore Kingdom were fully drawn into the anti-British struggle for self-rule as well as the struggle for responsible government in the Princely States. Leftists preferred to remain organisationally within the Congress, calling themselves socialists. Both left and right-wing groups joined forces in order to ensure the success of the Congress candidates in the 1936 Malabar district elections.

=== Birth of the Communist Party of India in Kerala ===
The rift between the major bloc of Indian National Congress and its socialist wing came into the open with the outbreak of World War II, the resignation of the provincial Congress ministers, and the beginning of individual satyagraha. The communists were expelled from the Congress Socialist Party in March 1940, after allegations that they had disrupted party activities and were intent on co-opting party organisations. Indeed, by the time the communists were expelled, they had gained control over the Congress Socialist Party units in what were to become the southern states of Kerala, Tamil Nadu, and Andhra Pradesh. The left-dominated Kerala Provincial Congress Committee, contrary to directive of the Congress, did not take action.

The left wing of Kerala met in a secret enclave at Parapram, Pinarayi, near Thalassery, and in December 1939, the CPI was founded. In 1957, the CPI was elected to rule the state government of Kerala, only to have the government dismissed and president's rule declared in 1959 following the Vimochana Samaram. In 1964, in conjunction with the widening rift between China and the Soviet Union, a large leftist faction of the CPI leadership, based predominantly in Kerala and West Bengal, split from the party to form the Communist Party of India (Marxist), or CPI (M). In Kerala, the CPI (M) — in coalition with other parties — wrested control from the Congress and its allies (frequently including the CPI) in 1967, in 1980, and in 1987. Support for the CPI (M) in Kerala in general elections has ranged from 19 percent to 26 percent, but the party has never won more than nine of Kerala's twenty seats in Parliament. But with the Left Democratic Front coalition, they won 19 seats out of 20 in 2004.

== Communism in practice ==
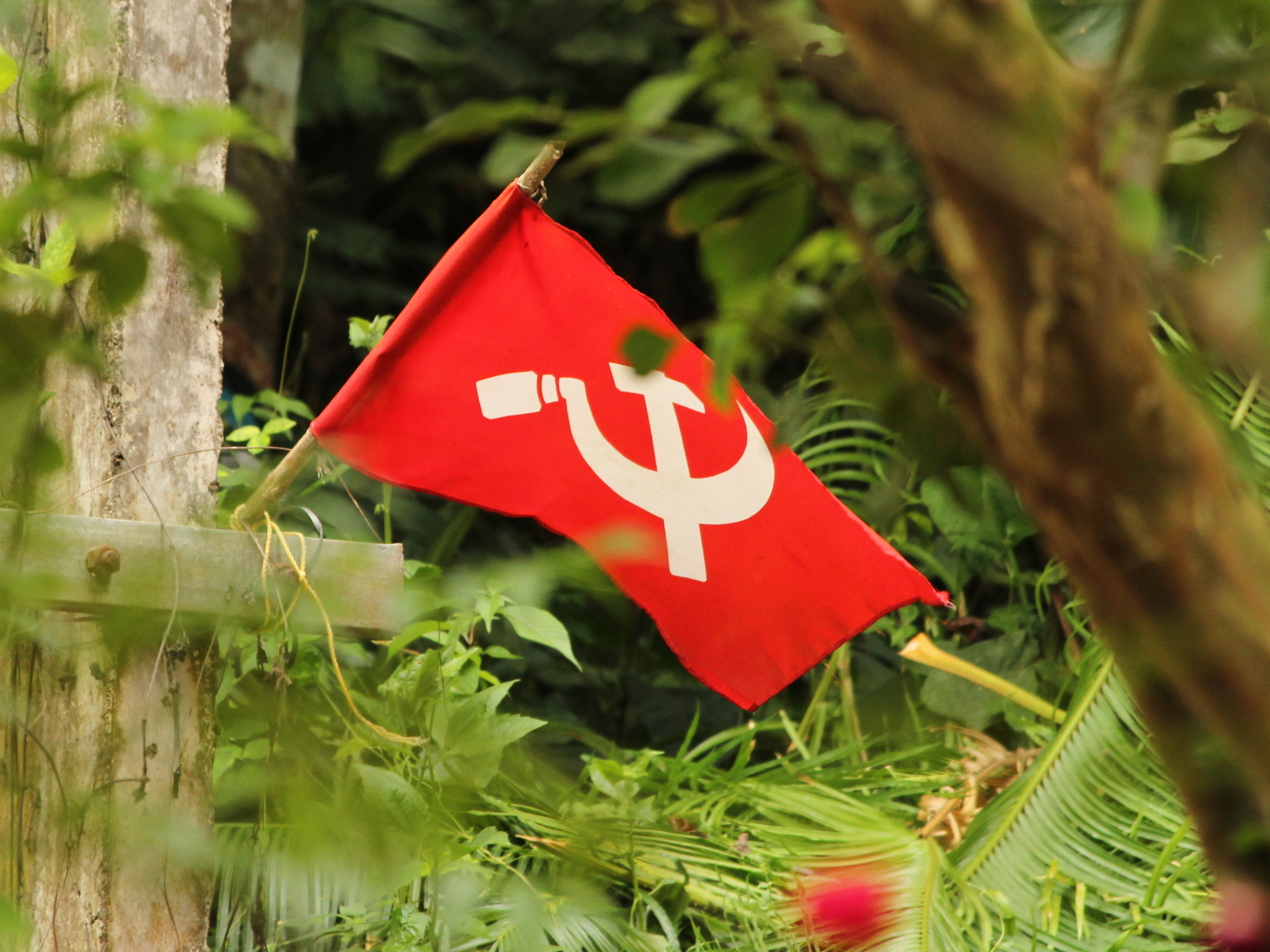
A communist flag in Kanjirappally, Kerala.

The Communist Party in Kerala has functioned under the conditions of a liberal democracy, relying on success in multi-party elections to remain in power. CPI's 1957 constitution stated it would allow the existence of opposing parties after it had a parliamentary majority. Party leaders, like Namboodiripad, did not like the idea of using military force to remain in power because it would reflect poorly on the CPI as a whole on a global stage. This reliance on the people's opinions created a tolerant communist government, but it also made it more difficult to enact radical reforms. Therefore, the reforms of the CPI in Kerala were mainly moderately socialist.

=== Agrarian reform ===
One of the major changes advocated by the CPI was the Agrarian Relations Bill, passed in 1961. The bill was intentionally moderate because those drafting it knew it would have to pass through many constitutional channels before it would be made into a law. Over 1,000 amendments were debated due to party divisions. Though the bill was moderate, it still changed the farming system. It abolished feudalism and aimed to create a capitalist agricultural system. The CPI did not push more radical Communist land reforms. Namboodiripad stated they would not attempt state ownership or collective farms because even though such ideas might appeal to intellectuals on a scientific basis, they would not actually help the peasantry in practice. The bill aimed to improve wages and working conditions as well as secure employment.

The CPI has sponsored agricultural cooperatives with the goal of promoting solidarity rather than competition.

=== Administrative reform ===
The CPI also wanted to reorganize its administrative structure. The administration was already undergoing changes after India gained independence and the local government in particular had new responsibilities. Rather than just tax collection, it had to focus more on development and welfare. In local government, the CPI promised less corruption, nepotism, political patronage, and inefficiency, which it planned to achieve through decentralization. Its main priority was building a socialist government. This required Congress's cooperation and the people's approval. In 1957 the party secretary, Govindan Nair, was concerned that the new government had still not improved the efficiency of the old administration. He used the newly created Administrative Reforms Committee to rectify this.

The committee was responsible for reviewing the existing administration and recommending new methods for coordinating governing bodies. It distributed a questionnaire concerning administrative machinery to over a thousand people, both within the government and outside of it. The CPI was seeking consensual reform rather than a drastic upheaval or consolidation of its own power. It wanted the cooperation of each governing body, down to the village level, to create a more efficient and democratic government. At the local level, the government relied the panchayat, or village council, to report on development and welfare. The Block Advisory Committee was a step above the panchayat, which had advising responsibilities along with other independent powers. Overall, the changes the CPI made once it was in government can be characterized as "Congress-socialist style reforms". Though it was a communist party, like any democratically elected power, the CPI had to balance its loyalty to the people with its desire to expand and increase power.

=== Industrial reform ===
It struggled to industrialize and develop new manufacturing plants in Kerala throughout the 1960s while balancing out the disparities of industrialization. The CPI had Industries ministers who were responsible for industrial development. It also had an Industrial Development Cooperation that gave financial assistance to companies to help them startup new manufacturing projects. In the early 1970s, the CPI created two new corporations to help with industrial development: the Kerala Industrial and Technical Consultancy Organization and the Kerala State Electronics Development Corporation. These measures improved industry on a state level, but were less successful at the local level. To revitalize local industry, the CPI launched an ambitious Four-Year Plan, perhaps modeling itself after Stalin's Five-Year Plans which Namboodiripad considered an inspiration. The Four-Year Plan involved district-level conventions to excite potential entrepreneurs since the government wanted more private investors to spur industry. These entrepreneurs were trained to set up their own industries. The plan was hugely successful within the first 6 weeks and managed to set up eleven new industrial estates, but then lagged as the program continued.

== See also ==
- Socialism in India
- History of Kerala
- Communism
- List of communist parties in India
