= N. E. Balaram =

Indian philosopher

Minister for Industries
- In office 4 October 1970 – 24 September 1971
- Preceded by: P. Ravindran
- Succeeded by: T. V. Thomas

Member of Parliament of Rajya Sabha for Kerala
- In office 1985–1994

Secretary of the Communist Party of India, Kerala State Council
- In office 1971–1984
- Preceded by: S. Kumaran
- Succeeded by: P. K. Vasudevan Nair

Member of the Kerala Legislative Assembly
- In office 1970–1977
- Preceded by: K. P. R. Gopalan
- Succeeded by: Pattiam Gopalan
- Constituency: Thalassery
- In office 1960–1965
- In office 1957–1960
- Preceded by: Established
- Succeeded by: Demolished
- Constituency: Mattanur

Personal details
- Born: 20 November 1919 Pinarayi, Kannur, Kerala, India
- Died: 16 July 1994 (aged 74)
- Party: Communist Party of India
- Spouse: Pankajakshy
- Children: 2 sons, 2 daughters

N.E. Balaram (Njalile Veettil Edavalathu Balaraman) (20 November 1919 – 16 July 1994) was one of the founding leaders of the communist movement in Kerala, India. A Marxist ideologue, scholar in Indian philosophy and a well known literary critic in Malayalam, he wrote on the history of the communist movement in Kerala, which is considered as the most authentic record of the early period. He also authored several works in history, philosophy, politics, and literature.

== Early life ==
Balaram was born on 20 November 1919 in Pinarayi, a village near Tellicherry Town in the Kannur District of India. Incidentally, Pinarayi is the birthplace of the Communist Party of India in Kerala, where it held its first meeting in 1939. Young Balaram (his real name was Balaraman, which was somehow shortened to Balaram) was an active member of that landmark conference held in a house near the village library, hardly 200 meters away from his home. He did schooling at a nearby village school. He studied up to 8th standard, which was considered (comparatively) a good school education at that time. After completing school, he became a faculty in a nearby school for a while. By then he was a known scholar in Sanskrit and Indian philosophy and had a good taste for spirituality which ultimately took him to the Ramkrishna Mission in Calcutta. There he spent several months learning more about the Vedas, the Upanishads and other ancient texts. He was dissatisfied with the ashram activities and returned to Kannur, a discontented young atheist.

Immediately upon return he jumped into political activities as a Congress worker. A socialist group had already been formed in the Congress by that time at the national level and some of the Kerala leaders showed interest in that group. Within a short while Balram too became a member of the Socialist group. In 1938 he attended the 51st session of the Indian National Congress held in Haripura, Gujarat, where the socialist group came out openly against the policies of the Congress.

== Political scenario ==
Back in Malabar the Congress socialist group started the ground work to build a Communist movement in the state. P. Krishna Pillai, K. Damodaran, E. M. S. Namboodiripad, and N. C. Sekhar were the first team of leaders who took up this cause for which they met unofficially. Then came the historic meeting in Pinarayi, where the entire socialist leadership decided to convert to the Communist Party. The young Balaram was one of the main organizers of this first meeting of the Communist Party of Kerala. The meeting was presided by Com. P. Krishna Pillai, who was elected as the Secretary of the party on that day. All the senior members of the team were very happy about the meeting and all of them congratulated the organizers and especially the young Balaram for his organizational abilities. Even before the meeting, he had held informal discussions with top leaders like P. Krishna Pillai and theoretician K. Damodaran. They recognized him as a good communist and gave all support. He was actively involved in organizing the party. He was arrested by the police several times and imprisoned for almost six years. He was Secretary of the party in the Kottayam Taluk in the 1940s.

== Election to State Assembly ==
In 1957, he was elected to the first Kerala Legislative Assembly from the Mattannur constituency. In 1960, he again represented Mattannur. In 1964, when the communist movement split into two on some ideological differences, Balaram stood with the original group known as the CPI (Communist Party of India). He was a member from the Tellicherry constituency to the Legislative body in 1970. He became a minister in the C. Achutha Menon ministry and held important portfolios like Industry and Public Relations. Next year he resigned from the ministry to take charge as the State Secretary of the Communist party of India. He held that post till 1984. Then he became the Secretary of the National Council of the party as well as the Member of the Rajya Sabha, the upper house of the Indian Parliament. He held both the posts till his death. He was the leader of the party in parliament also. He headed a Constitutional Reform Committee of the party when the Soviet Crisis erupted.

== Other interests ==
He was a passionate reader of world literature and a critic of Malayalam literature. He wrote several books on various subjects, which include economics, physics, history, philosophy, politics and archaeology. Once, he was invited by the Chief Minister of Andhra Pradesh to help the team of archaeologists who held excavation in Vijaya Nagara, knowing fully that he was an expert in Pali language. During his last days he vehemently opposed the Hindutva Movement under the Bharatiya Janata Party and wrote books and articles against their activities. His voice was heard even by opponents as it always contained valuable and authentic information and clear analysis.

== Death ==
Balaram died of a cardiac arrest on 16 July 1994, while serving as a member of Rajya Sabha, the upper house of the Parliament of India, aged 75. He was survived by his wife and four children, including Geetha Nazeer, a CPI politician, journalist and author.

== Works ==
- A Short History of the Communist Party of India, Prabath Book House, Thiruvananthapuram, 1967
- Indyayude Piravi
- Keralathile Communist Prasthanam, Adyanalukal
- Saoundryolsvam
- Bharatheeyapaithrukam
- N. E. Balaram Sampoorna Krithikal (10 volumes)
