= K. A. Keraleeyan =

Indian politician

K.A.Keraleeyan (born: Kadayaprath Kunjappa Nambiar) (1910–1994) was one of the founder-leaders of the Communist Party of India in Kerala. He was born on 15 April 1910, in Chirakkal taluk in Kannur district.

His father was Varikkara Padinjare Veettil Kunjiraman Nayanar and his mother was Kadayaprath Parvathy Amma. He did his schooling at Kunjimangalam Board School and Peralassery Elementary School. Later he went to Thanjavur to study Sanskrit but could not finish it as he jumped into the fray of the Indian National Movement. On coming back he joined Vijnanadayini Sanskrit school, Kanjangadu and continued his studies. When the procession in connection with the legendary Salt March started from Kozhikode to Payyanur he joined it along with P. Krishna Pillai, K.Madhavan and others. Following the protest against Gandhiji’s arrest he was arrested and produced before the court. When he was asked his name at the court as part of the official procedure he replied, Keralaeeyan (literally meaning one from Kerala) to declare his political stand and then onwards he was known by that name.

Following his participation in the Non-cooperation movement he was imprisoned again and sent to Central jail, Kannur. In 1932 he formed Karshakasamgham the pioneering farmers’ organization in Kerala and became a worker of the Congress Socialist party formed by the left wingers of the Congress party. He participated in the ‘Pattinijatha’(literally meaning 'starvation march') went to Madras from Malabar in 1932. Along with P. Krishna Pillai he organised the workers of Aron Mill, Pappinissery, Cotton Mill. Thiruvannur and Feroke Tiles. Later he functioned as the secretary of Malabar Karshaka Sangham and Kisan Samgham. He was a member of the central committee of All India Kisan Sabha. He led the Communist group of the Socialist party along with K.Damodaran, E. M. S. Namboodiripad and N.C.Sekhar. As a member of the Communist Party he had to go underground and was arrested in Madras in 1942 and sent to Central Jail, Alipur. When the party was later banned he again went underground.

In the '60s he functioned as the editor of the magazine Krushikkaran. Later he was a member of the State Control Commission of the Communist Party of India. He has written a lot of articles as part of his social work in various periodicals and his autobiography is considered a valuable historical document of the socialist and Communist movement in Kerala in its nascent days. He died on 9 July 1994, at Kozhikode. His wife was Ammini Amma. They have three sons Neeni, Unni and Chandrasekharan.
