= Communist Revolutionary Party =

Political party in Kerala, India

Communist Revolutionary Party was a political party in Kerala, India. It was led by K.P.R. Gopalan. The party contested the 1970 elections, without success. It was, however, significant since this was the first group coming from the AICCCR tradition who tried to use elections for revolutionary purposes.
