= C. Unniraja =

Indian Politician and leader of Communist Party of India

Personal details
- Born: 15 July 1917 Vadakkekad, Ponnani Taluk, Madras Presidency, British India (Now in Thrissur, Kerala)
- Died: 28 January 1995 (aged 77)
- Party: Communist Party of India
- Spouse: Radhamma
- Children: Two Sons, One Daughter

C. Unniraja (15 July 1917 - 28 January 1995) is an Indian Politician and leader of Communist Party of India. He was a theoretician of the party. He was a member of the CPI National Council. He was also the Asian Editor of the World Marxist Review, published in Prague, Czechoslovakia from 1968 to 1972. Also he was the chief editor of Janayugom and Navayugom. The Central Intelligence Agency (CIA) mentions Unniraja in their report.
