= Parthasarathy Iyengar =

K. S. Parthasarathy Iyengar, also spelled Parthasarathi Ayyangar (1 May 1903 – 13 July 1983) was a lawyer and police commissioner in the state of Tamil Nadu in India, known for his erudition and writing ability.

== Early life ==
Iyengar was the second son of K. C. Srinivasa Iyengar, B.A., a leading mirasudar of Kulumani, which is a suburb of the town of Trichy. He studied at the Madras Law College where he received his BL and ML degrees winning several gold medals.

== Career ==
Iyengar began his career as an apprentice under the lawyer Sir Alladi Krishnaswamy Iyer. He then took the Imperial Police Examination and was selected for the Imperial Police Service in 1926. He was posted to Thanjavur Thereon, where he rose in rank from Superintendent of Police (SP) to Deputy Inspector General of Police (IG) and later to Commissioner of Police for Madras.

He was seconded to the Travancore state as the Inspector General of police and worked there from 1944 to 1947. There he worked with the Dewan to suppress the Punnapra-Vayalar uprising of workers in Travancore. When India gained independence from British rule, however, he opted to return to Madras State, declining an offer of the British authorities to serve in the Commonwealth.

In 1958, he moved to Delhi and was appointed to the post of Inspector General of Railway Protection Force and formed the organization. He was also the Director of Vigilance - Railway Board, as well as a part-time member of the Union Public Service Commission.

== Retirement ==
Upon retirement he decided to return to Madras to devote himself to social service. Parthasarathy died on 13 July 1983, at the age of 80.
