= Janayugom =

Indian newspaper

- Type: Daily newspaper
- Format: Print, online
- Owner: Kerala State Council of the Communist Party of India
- Publisher: Janayugom Publications Limited
- Editor-in-chief: Binoy Viswam
- Editor: Rajaji Mathew Thomas
- Founded: 1947; 78 years ago
- Political alignment: Left-wing
- Language: Malayalam
- Headquarters: Thiruvananthapuram
- City: Kollam
- Website: www.janayugomonline.com
- Free online archives: epaper.janayugomonline.com www.facebook.com/janayugomdaily/

Janayugom is a Malayalam daily newspaper published in Kerala, India. It is the official organ of the Kerala State Council of the Communist Party of India. It is the first newspaper in India using free software. Originally started in 1947 as a weekly magazine from Quilon to propagate the news and views of the party, on 16 November 1953 it was converted as a daily newspaper.

The first editor was N. Gopinathan Nair (alias Velya Gopi) and the first manager R. Gopinathan Nair (alias Kochu Gopi). M.N. Govindan Nair, a senior figure in the Communist Party of India, supported the conversion of the publication from a weekly to a daily newspaper. By the 1950s, the Janayugom daily newspaper also was started and by the 70s the Janayugom family of publications had expanded to include Cinerama, a film weekly, Balayugom, a children's monthly and Janayugom Novelpathippu, a literary magazine. Later, all of these publications stopped one by one and only a monthly magazine from Calicut remained. In 2007 Janayugom was rejuvenated, now as a daily news paper. Marxist theoreticians like C. Unniraja have been its chief editors. Its chief editor is Binoy Viswam and editor is Rajaji Mathew Thomas.

== Free/open-source software ==
In November 2019, the newspaper migrated to open-source software. All desktops were moved to customized Linux distribution of Ubuntu, all image editing was moved to GIMP and all desktop publishing was moved to Scribus. Savings from the use of free software was over 10 million Indian Rupees ($130,000).

== Supplements ==
- Vaarantham
- Sahapadi
- Sthreeyugom
- Yuvakalasahithi

== See also ==
- List of Malayalam-language newspapers
- List of Malayalam-language periodicals
- List of newspapers in India
