= P. S. Namboodiri =

Indian politician

P. S. Namboodiri (1915 – July 5, 1979) was a freedom fighter and an Indian politician and leader of Communist Party of India. He represented Kodakara constituency in the 3rd KLA. He was one of the four participants from Cochin in the 1939 Parappuram Conference of the Communist Party of India. He played the role of Madhavan in the play Adukkalayilninnu Arangathekku.

== Biography ==
While still a student, he entered the public sphere through activities related to social reform in the community. He was a Congress activist in the early days and worked as part of the non-cooperation movement. He joined the KPCC in 1934 and was a member of the executive committee of the Congress Socialist Party. He joined the Communist Party of India in 1939 and was an active participant in organizing trade unions in Kochi. He led the Kochi temple entry agitation and the Karshaka Jatha.

He died on July 5, 1979, at the party office in Ambalur.
