= P. P. Suneer =

Indian politician

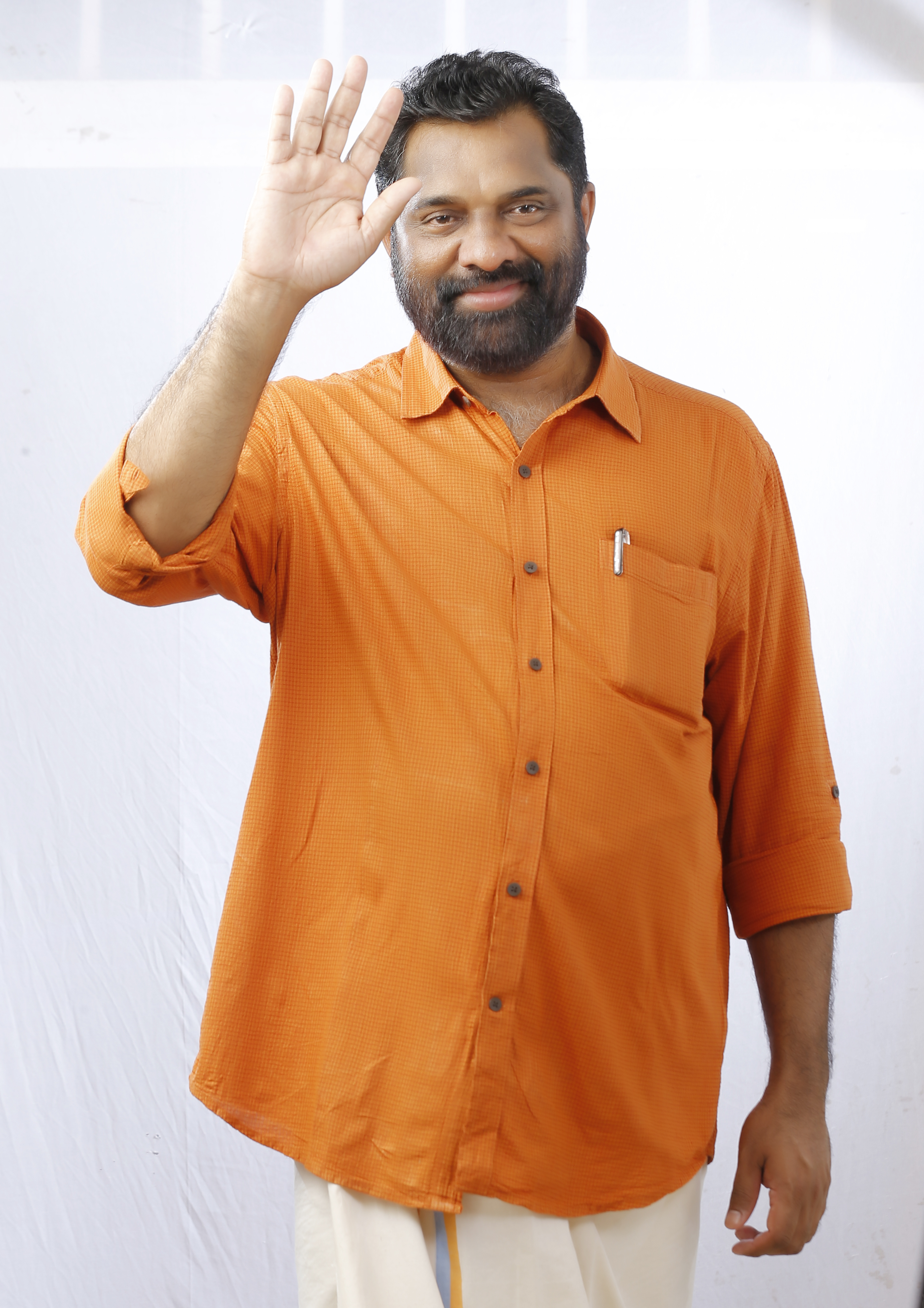

Member of Parliament, Rajya Sabha
- Incumbent
- Assumed office 2 July 2024
- Preceded by: Elamaram Kareem
- Constituency: Kerala

Personal details
- Party: Communist Party of India

P. P. Suneer is an Indian politician from Kerala. He was elected unopposed to Rajya Sabha from Kerala as a member of Communist Party of India.
