= Navayugom =

- Type: Fortnightly
- Format: Print
- Owner: Kerala State Council of the Communist Party of India
- Publisher: K. Prekash Babu
- Editor-in-chief: Pannyan Raveendran
- Editor: R. Ajayan
- Founded: 7 January 1950; 76 years ago
- Political alignment: Left-wing
- Language: Malayalam
- Headquarters: Thiruvananthapuram

Navayugom is a Malayalam fortnightly published in Kerala, India. It is the official organ of the Kerala State Council of the Communist Party of India. Navayugam started publishing on 7 January 1950, as Weekly. K. Damodaran was the first editor.
