= Communist League (India, 1931) =

The Communist League was a political organisation, formed in Trivandrum, India, in 1931. The group conducted propaganda for communism in the city and organised a trade union amongst press workers. It was however, without contact with other communist groups in the country at the time. N. C. Sekhar, who was one of the founding members of the Kerala unit of the Communist Party of India in 1937, had been a member of this group. The Party merged with Communist Party of India in 1937.
