= N. C. Sekhar =

N. C. Sekhar alias Narayanan Pillai Sekhar Chandrasekharan Pillai (2 July 1904 – 3 December 1986) was a freedom fighter, political leader, Rajya Sabha member and writer. He was a member of the first Communist group in Kerala. Sekhar was one of the four founding leaders of the Communist Party of India in Kerala who participated in the formation of the Communist League in Thiruvananthapuram in 1931.

He joined the national movement during his education. Gandhiji's ideals were very appealing to him. He participated in the 1930 Civil disobedience movement and was imprisoned. While in jail, he met Bhagat Singh's colleagues. Sekhar began to think seriously about new avenues for freedom. When the Congress Socialist Party was formed in 1934, P. Krishna Pillai contacted Sekhar and entrusted him with the task of building the Kozhikode trade unions.

When the agitation for responsible governance took place in Travancore, Sekhar came to Travancore from Kozhikode and participated in it. In 1949 he had to go into hiding. He was elected to the Rajya Sabha in 1954. When the party split, he sided with the CPI (M). He was expelled from the party in 1967. Although he worked with the Naxalite movement, he soon withdrew and returned to the CPI (M).

He died on December 3, 1986.
