= M. N. Govindan Nair =

Indian politician

Member of Parliament for Thiruvananthapuram
- In office 1977–1979
- Preceded by: V. K. Krishna Menon
- Succeeded by: Neelalohithadasan Nadar

Minister for Electricity and Housing Government of Kerala
- In office 25 September 1971 – 25 March 1977
- Preceded by: P. S. Sreenivasan (Minister For Electricity and Transport)
- Succeeded by: P. K. Vasudevan Nair (Minister For Electricity)

Minister for Agriculture & Electricity Government of Kerala
- In office 6 March 1967 – 21 October 1969
- Preceded by: E. P. Poulose (Minister For Agriculture)
- Succeeded by: O. Koran (Minister For Agriculture)

Member of the Kerala Legislative Assembly
- In office 1970–1977
- Preceded by: D. D. Potti
- Succeeded by: E. Chandrasekharan Nair
- Constituency: Chadayamangalam
- In office 1967–1970
- Preceded by: K. Krishna Pillai
- Succeeded by: K. Krishna Pillai
- Constituency: Punalur

Member of Parliament of Rajya Sabha
- In office 1956–1967(Resigned)
- Constituency: Kerala

Secretary of the Communist Party of India, Kerala State Council
- In office 1970–1971
- Preceded by: S. Kumaran
- Succeeded by: N. E. Balaram
- In office 1956–1959
- Preceded by: C. Achutha Menon
- Succeeded by: E. M. S. Namboodiripad

Member of Travancore-Cochin Legislative Assembly
- In office 1952–1954

Minister for Transport, Government of Kerala
- In office 25 September 1971 – 25 December 1975
- Preceded by: P. S. Sreenivasan (Minister For Electricity and Transport)
- Succeeded by: R. Balakrishna Pillai (Minister For Transport)

Personal details
- Born: 10 December 1910 Pandalam, Pathanamthitta, Kerala, India
- Died: 27 November 1984 (aged 73)
- Party: Communist Party of India
- Spouse: Devaki
- Children: 1 Son, 1 Daughter

M. N. Govindan Nair (10 December 1910 – 27 November 1984), popularly known as MN, was an Indian communist politician born in Pandalam, in Pathanamthitta district, India. He is known as "Kerala Khrushchev".

== Political life ==
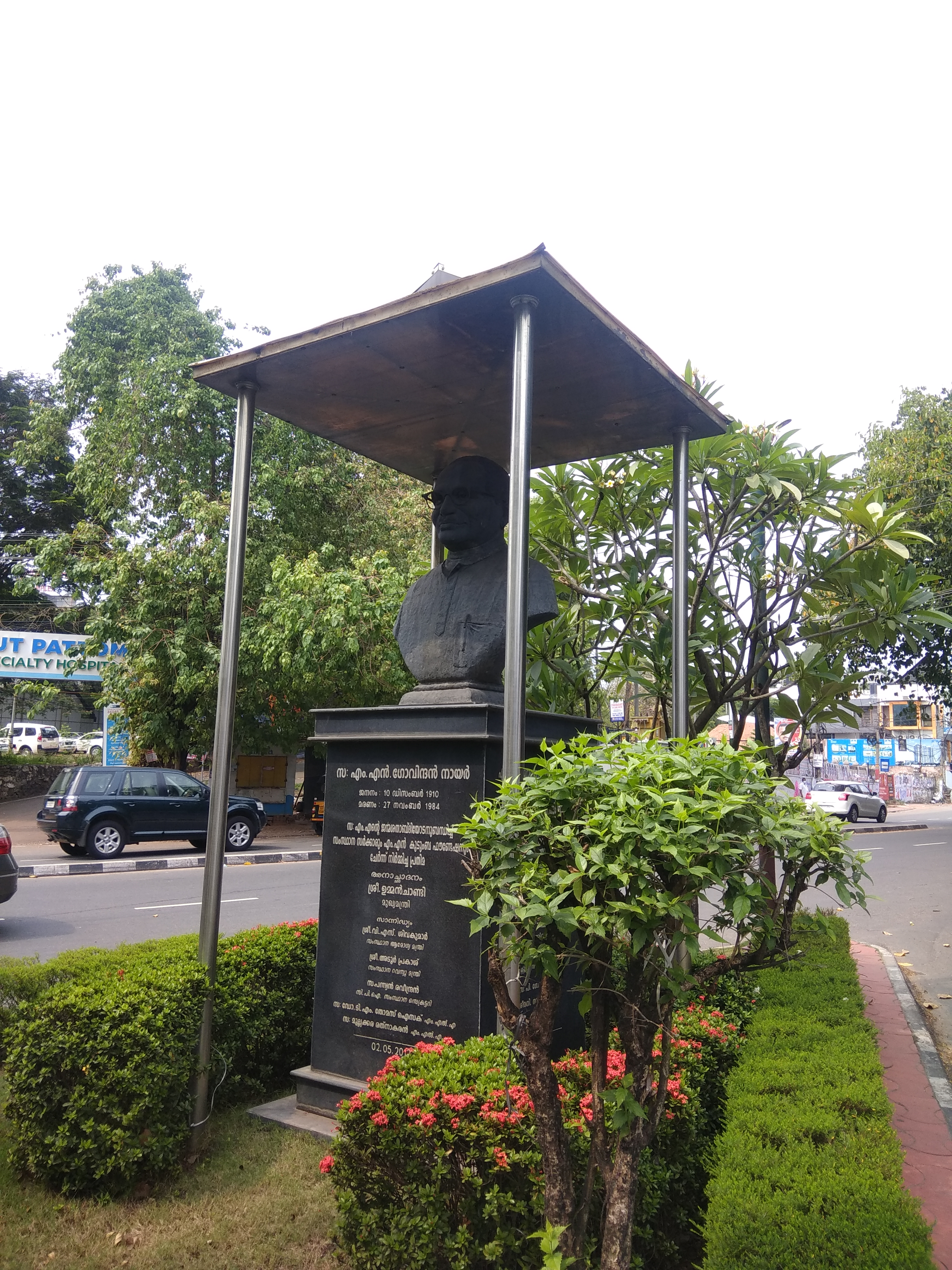
Statue in Pattom, Thiruvananthapuram

M.N. began his public life by involving himself in anti-caste struggles taking place in the locality. He was also associated with Nair Service Society in his early days.

M.N's political life got a fillip when he visited Wardha, and met with many national leaders including Jawaharlal Nehru. Later he joined the communist movement in Kerala. He was one of the foremost leaders of the Communist Party of India (CPI).

He was the General Secretary of the Communist Party of India (CPI), and it was under his secretaryship that CPI came to power in the 1957 General Elections in Kerala which made the path for the E.M.S. Namboothiripad Ministry of 1957–1959. In 1964 when Communist Party split he remained in the CPI. He was Member of Parliament, and served as the Minister of Kerala. He was elected to the Kerala Legislative Assembly in the General Elections of 1967 from Punalur Constituency and re-elected to the Assembly from Chadayamangalam Constituency in 1971 General Election. He undertook portfolios like Minister for Agriculture, Transport, Electricity and Housing in the Fourth Kerala Legislative Assembly in the C. Achutha Menon Government from 4 October 1970 to 25 March 1977.

== Major policies ==
He was instrumental in pushing lot of radical and progressive policies and legislations in Kerala.

M.N. was responsible for launching the 'Laksham Veedu' or One Lakh housing scheme project in 1972, aimed at providing housing for the under privileged. In his respect, the scheme is now named after him.

While being part of United Front (1970–1979, Kerala) he pushed legislations like Kerala Private Forests (Vesting and Assignment) Act, 1971 which nationalised private forest in Malabar region, Kerala Land Reforms (Amendment) Act, 1969 etc.
