= Punnapra-Vayalar uprising =

1946 communist uprising in the princely state of Travancore

Punnapra-Vayalar Uprising
- Part of the Communist Movements in Travancore against the Diwan
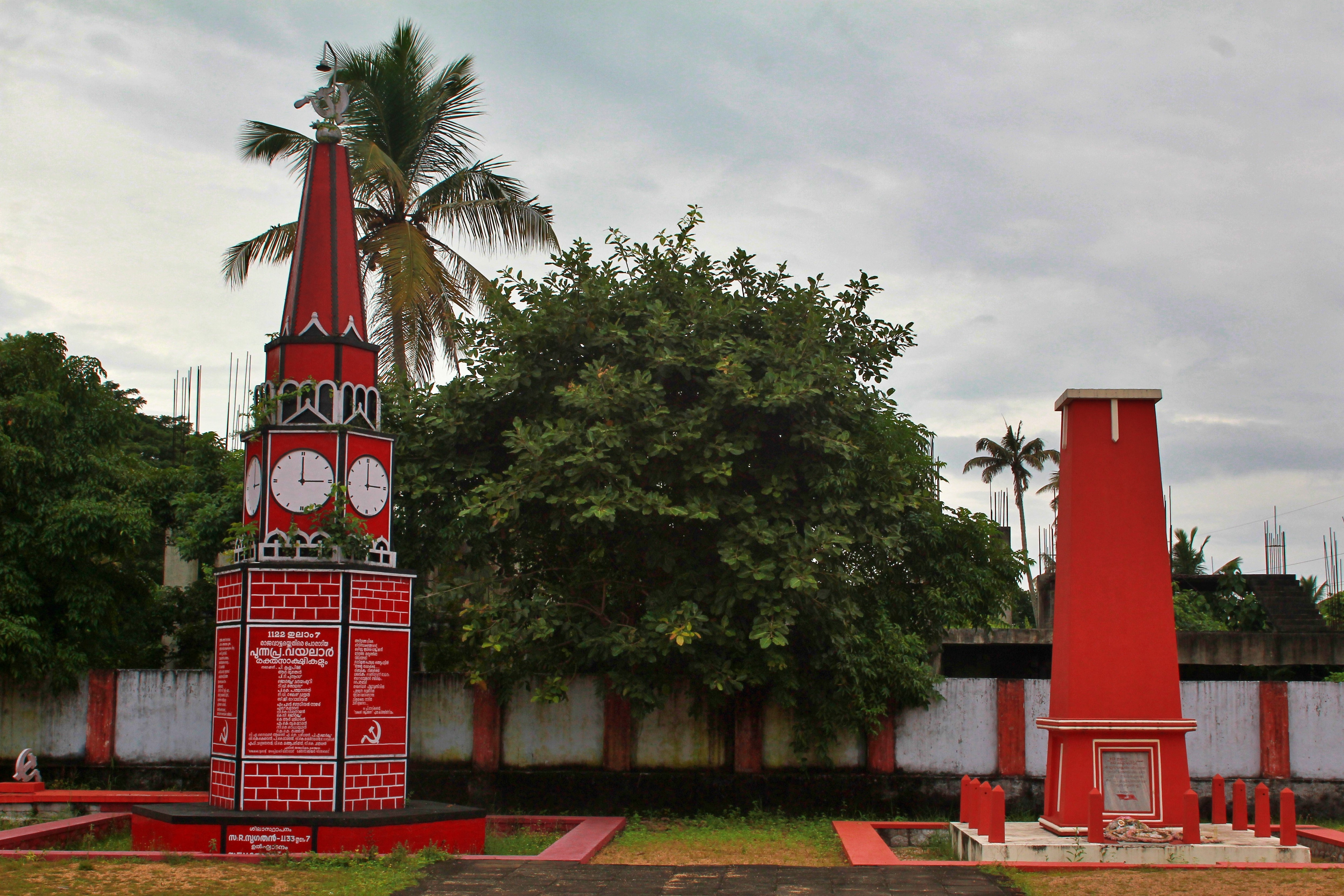
- Memorial to those killed in the Punnapra-Vayalar uprising located near Kalarcode, Alappuzha
Date	October 1946
Location	Punnapra and Vayalar, Travancore Princely State (present-day Alappuzha, Kerala, India)
Result	Victory of the Travancore forces, defeat of the Communist uprising

Belligerents
(Travancore) Kingdom of Travanore	Laborers in Punnapra and Vayalar; Communist Party of India

Commanders and leaders
C. P. Ramaswami Iyer K. Kelappan Nair	T. V. Thomas, R. Sugathan, S. Kumaran, P.T. Punnoose

Casualties and losses
40 deaths	More than 1,000 people dead

The Punnapra-Vayalar uprising (October 1946) was a militant communist movement in the Princely State of Travancore, against the Diwan, C. P. Ramaswami Iyer and the state. The revolt is named after the two places where it took place, beginning in Punnapra and ending in Vayalar.

Historians like Prof Sreedhara Menon (though it is claimed that he had retracted his views later) maintain this was a proper struggle against the declaration of 'Independent Travancore' by the then Travancore.

== Background ==
Sir CP Ramaswami Iyer had proposed constitutional reforms, making Travancore an independent country, instead of joining Indian Union. Iyer had proposed an 'American model' for Travancore.

The Communists in Travancore opposed this move with the slogans, '(Throw the) American Model in the Arabian Sea' (American Model Arabikkadalil) . The struggle against the Travancore Kingdom began in 1939 when the merger of socialist parties, which created a new radical communist party took place. The brutal famine conditions in Travancore Kingdom during the Second World War had pushed the peasants towards the Communists. Over 21,000 peasants died in Cherthala taluk alone during the Famine (1939–43) (the Famine which had a disastrous effect in India, especially in West Bengal) which led to growing discontent in Cherthala and Ambalapuzha taluks against the establishment.

In March 1946, Alappuzha was filled up by Travancore Police to attack the members of ATTUC (All Travancore Trade Union Congress), who used non-violent protests against the Diwan for not helping poor during the Famine.

In response, over 2,000 communists attacked police stations all across Alappuzha and practically established their independent government free from the monarchy. The government was established from Cherthala to Ambalapuzha, a stretch of 40 kilometres (25 mi) in Alappuzha. The communist cadres in Alappuzha were given military training by some ex-servicemen who had returned home from the Second World War. The Avarna communist cadres were armed with country weapons, especially varikundams (spears made out of arecanut tree stems).

On 25 October 1946 (Maharaja's Birthday), the new Travancore constitution was to be implemented, Making Travancore an Independent Country (American model). Over 1000 communists in Vayalar fiercely retaliated against this move and revolted and killed Travancore police officials and government officials in that region. Dismayed by the turn of events and to regain control in the region, the Diwan declared martial law in Alleppey on 25 October 1946. The Travancore army moved from their camp and surrounded the communists at Vayalar by 27 October. The Travancore navy supported the army in isolating Vayalar, which is surrounded by water on three sides. Once the blockade was in place, the army moved in. The communists were defeated and over 470 communists were killed and rest submitted within a few minutes. When the communist front line reached the Travancore army, the army killed 470 communists while losing 40 men.

On the same day, at least 130 people were killed in army firings, at different places due to erupting violence in the district. The situation had gone out of control from the hands of Diwan. The local people and press maintain that many more people were killed and the bodies disposed by the army. Following the suppression of the communist local governments, the Travancore police in an attempt to bring peace in the region and used strict methods to repress the political movement in the region and detained many activists without any trial temporarily to handle the situation.

In order to achieve this aggressive police response, the Diwan C. P. Ramaswami Iyer had sidelined his General Officer Commander (G.O.C.), V.N. Parameswaran Pillai, in favor of the Inspector General, Parthasarathy Iyengar, who shared the Diwan's views. The G.O.C. subsequently resigned.

== After effects ==
Memorial in Punnapra

The killings of communist comrades turned the Communists and even some non-communists totally against Iyer. When, on 3 June 1947, United Kingdom accepted demands for a partition and announced its intention to quit India within a short period, the Maharaja of Travancore desired to declare himself independent. Supported by the Diwan C.P.Ramaswami Iyer, the Maharaja Chithira Thirunal Balarama Varma issued a declaration of independence on 18 June 1947.

As Travancore's declaration of independence was unacceptable to India, negotiations were started with the Diwan by the Government of India. Even Sardar Patel in presence of Mountbatten had warned Sir CP and Travancore Kingdom against the move for Independence.

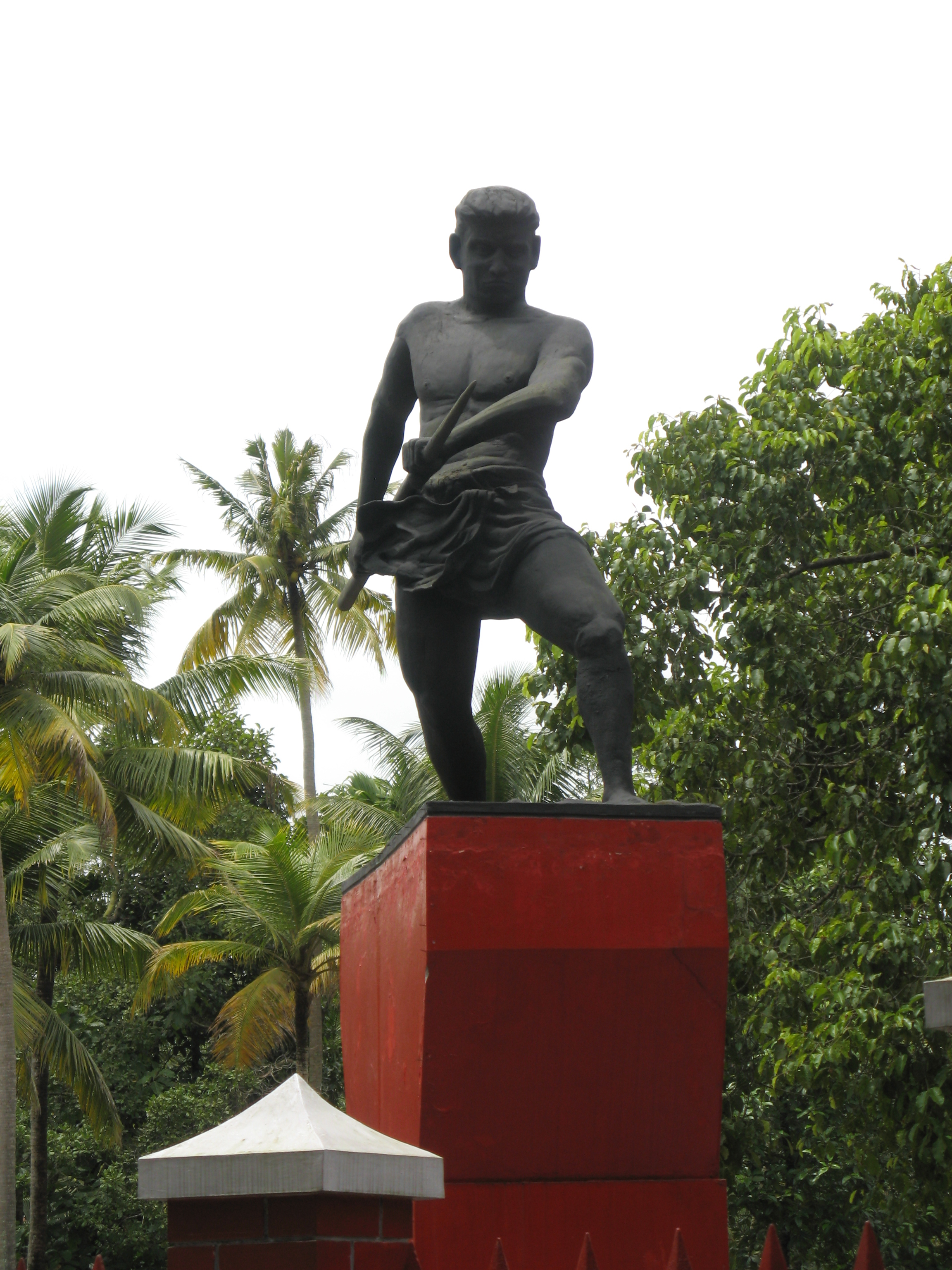
Memorial Statue of the uprising

Family sources indicate that C. P. himself was not in favour of independence but only greater autonomy and that a favourable agreement had been reached between C. P. and the Indian representatives by 23 July 1947 and accession to the Indian Union could not be carried out only because it was pending approval by the Maharaja. Soon, an assassination attempt was made on C. P. by K.C.S. Mani who was an activist of a Socialist group, on 25 July 1947 during a concert commemorating the anniversary of Swathi Thirunal Rama Varma.

== Views ==
Historian Manu S. Pillai described Punnapra-Vayalar as an Ezhava uprising against the Travancore Kingdom and its Nair aristocracy. The communists who took part in Punnapra revolt were mostly coir workers of Rural Alappuzha. They still form the backbone of Communist parties in Kerala even today.

Punnapra-Vayalar is described by Robin Jeffrey as the only moment in history when an organised working class led an armed revolt against a British-backed kingdom.

== In popular culture ==
- 1968: Punnapra Vayalar is a Malayalam language film starring Prem Nazir was based on the Punnapra Vayalar Uprising.
- 1970: Ningalenne Communistakki (film) is a Malayalam language film Sathyan (actor) and Prem Nazir has some part of the uprising. This film was based on the play of the same name Ningalenne Communistakki (1952)

== See also ==
- List of massacres in India
- Calcutta massacres
- Noakhali massacres
- Bihar massacres
