= P. K. Vasudevan Nair =

Former Chief Minister of Kerala

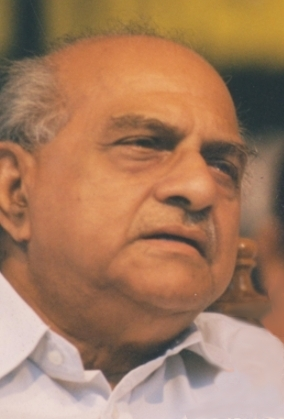

7th Chief Minister of Kerala
- In office 29 October 1978 – 7 October 1979
- Preceded by: A. K. Antony
- Succeeded by: C.H. Mohammed Koya

Member of Parliament, Lok Sabha
- In office 2004 – 12 July 2005
- Preceded by: V. S. Sivakumar
- Succeeded by: Pannyan Raveendran
- Constituency: Thiruvananthapuram
- In office 1967–1971
- Preceded by: Established
- Succeeded by: M. M. Joseph
- Constituency: Peermade
- In office 1962–1967
- Preceded by: P.T. Punnoose
- Succeeded by: Susheela Gopalan
- Constituency: Ambalappuzha
- In office 1957–1962
- Preceded by: C. P. Mathen
- Succeeded by: Ravindra Varma
- Constituency: Thiruvalla

Member of Kerala Legislative Assembly
- In office 1977–1982
- Preceded by: T. V. Thomas
- Succeeded by: K. P. Ramachandran Nair
- Constituency: Alappuzha

Secretary of the Communist Party of India Kerala State Council
- In office 1984–1998
- Preceded by: S. Kumaran
- Succeeded by: Veliyam Bharghavan

Minister For Industries and Electricity, Government Of Kerala
- In office 11 April 1977 - 27 October 1978
- Ministry: First Karunakaran ministry; First Antony ministry
- Preceded by: T. V. Thomas (Minister For Industries); M. N. Govindan Nair (Minister For Electricity)
- Succeeded by: P. S. Sreenivasan (Minister For Industries); K. P. Prabhakaran (Minister For Electricity)

Personal details
- Born: Padayatt Kesava Pillai Vasudevan Nair; 2 March 1926 Kidangoor, Travancore, British India
- Died: 12 July 2005 (aged 79) New Delhi, India
- Party: Communist Party of India
- Spouse: K. P. Lakshmi Kutty Amma
- Children: 5
- Education: Government Law College, Thiruvananthapuram

Padayatt Kesava Pillai Vasudevan Nair (2 March 1926 – 12 July 2005), popularly known as PKV, was an Indian politician and lawyer who served as the 9th Chief Minister of Kerala from 1978 to 1979. He was a Member of the Lok Sabha from 1957 to 1971 and again from 2004 until his death in 2005. He became Chief Minister on 29 October 1978, following A. K. Antony's resignation as Chief Minister. However he resigned on 7 October 1979 owing to differences with other parties in the United Front. He served in the Kerala Legislative Assembly from 1977 to 1982. Nair was a senior member of the Communist Party of India.

He was the founder-president of the Travancore Students Union, All India Students Federation (AISF) and All India Youth Federation (AIYF). He remained with the CPI after the split in the Communist movement in 1964 and was elected the party's State secretary in 1982.

== Early life and education ==
He was born in Kidangoor village in Kottayam, Kerala to a Hindu Nair family of Kesava Pillai and Nanikutty Amma. He was their eldest child. He completed his pre-degree from SB College Changanasserry. He began his political life as a student activist while studying in Union Christian College, Aluva, when the whole country was in upheaval having entered the final phase of the Indian independence movement. After graduating in Physics he went on to study law at Government Law College, Thiruvananthapuram. PKV had his baptism in politics during his student days as an activist of the All India Students Federation (AISF).

== Political career ==
=== Youth politics ===
He joined the Communist Party of India in 1945 like many young radicals of his time who thought Congress were too moderate and pro-rich. The subsequent years saw him evolve as a student and youth leader. He was the president of Travancore Students' Union in 1947 and elected as President of All Kerala Students Federation in 1948.

=== Politics in Travancore-Cochin state ===
PKV was first arrested for making a speech against the royal ruler of Travancore. He was among hundreds of communists who went underground when the Communist Party of India was banned following its adoption of the Calcutta Thesis that called for armed struggle against the ruling government in 1948. He took part in underground activities from 1948 to 1951 and was arrested in 1951 in connection with students' movement.

P K Vasudevan Nair and Balraj Sahani backed the idea of All India Youth Federation. Delhi's firebrand youth leader, Guru Radha Kishan was very active in organising the first national conference of AIYF in Delhi, this wholehearted effort was visible when more than 250 delegates and observers across India representing several youth organizations of various states attended this conference. PKV had acted as president of All India Students Federation, All India Youth Federation (AIYF) and Vice President of World Federation of Democratic Youth (WFDY).

=== Niyamasabha MLA and Lok Sabha MP ===
He was elected to the Lok Sabha from Tiruvalla in 1957 from Ambalappuzha in 1962 and from Peermade in 1967. He was in the panel of chairmen and secretary of CPI Parliamentary Party in the Lok Sabha from 1967 to 1970. He was elected the MLA from Alappuzha in 1977 and 1980.

=== Chief Minister ===
When the Communist Party split in 1964, he stayed with the CPI. After a long national parliamentary career, PKV returned to state politics in the 1970s and was elected to the Kerala Assembly in 1977 in the election held after the Emergency. He was the Industries Minister in the Karunakaran and A.K. Antony ministries from April 1977 to October 1978. When Antony resigned in 1979 protesting against the Congress' choice of Indira Gandhi as a candidate in Chikmagalur Lok Sabha by-election, PKV became Chief Minister with the support of the Congress on 29 October 1978 and occupied the post till 7 October 1979.

House	Election	Constituency	Result	Majority
Parliament	1957	Thiruvalla	Won	3607
Parliament	1962	Ambalapuzha	Won	11233
Parliament	1967	Peermade	Won	48581
Kerala Legislative Assembly	1977	Alappuzha	Won	9670
Kerala Legislative Assembly	1980	Alappuzha	Won	1003
Kerala Legislative Assembly	1982	Alappuzha	Lost	1590
Parliament	2004	Trivandrum	Won	54603

== Personal life ==
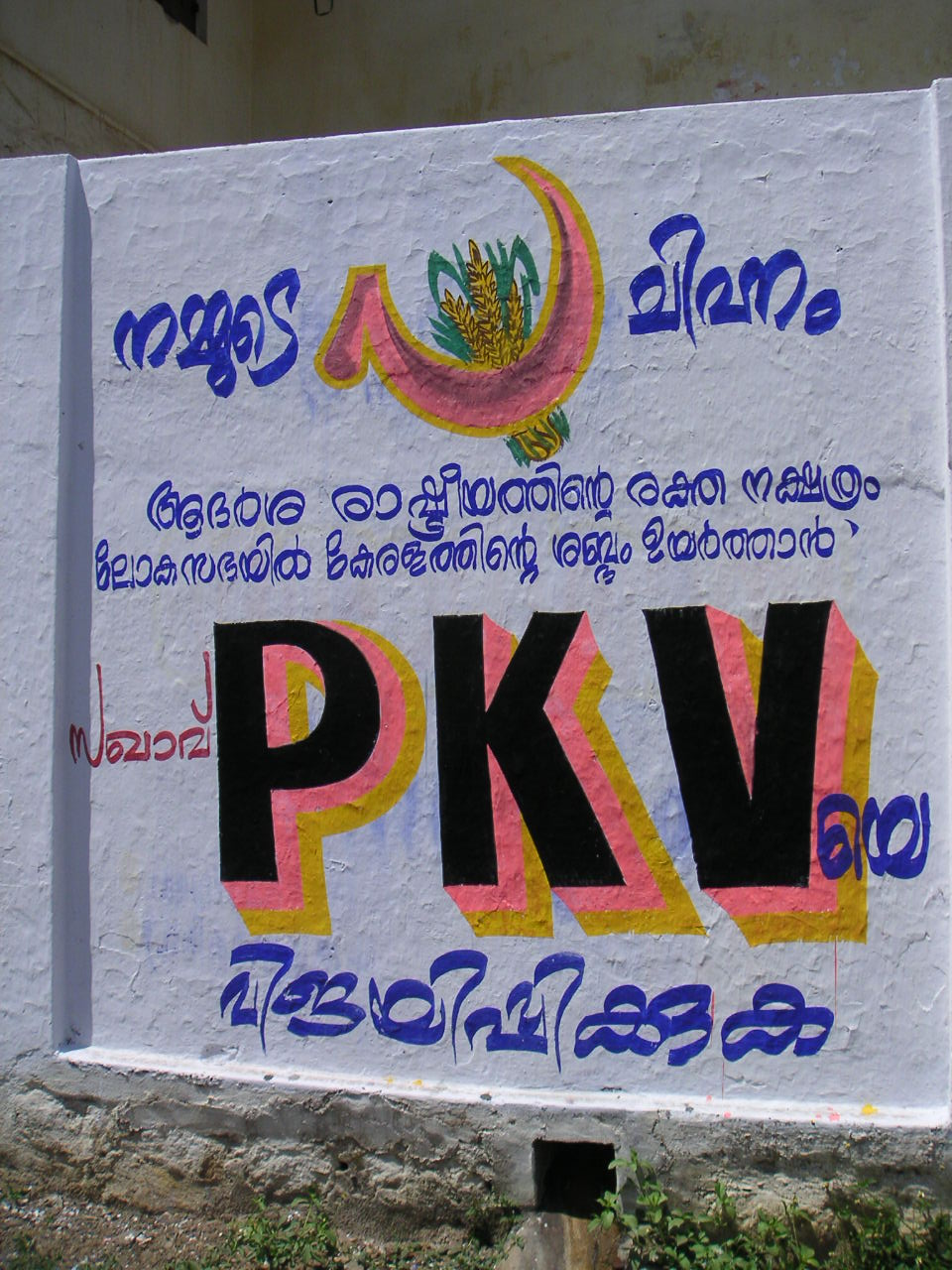
PKV election mural 2004

From 1982 to 2004, PKV had stayed away from electoral politics, concentrating his time and energy on the organisational front. During this period, he mostly served as the state secretary of CPI.

PKV also served as editor of Janayugom daily, the organ of the Communist Party of India between 1954 and 1957.

== Death ==
PKV died at 3.35 PM on 12 July 2005 in AIIMS, New Delhi following multiple organ failure brought about by chronic heart ailment and severe diabetes, from both he suffered for a long time. He was serving as the Lok Sabha MP from Thiruvananthapuram constituency, elected in 2004 elections. He was cremated at his daughter's house at Pulluvazhy near Perumbavoor. His wife, Lakshmikutty Amma, who was the younger sister of P. Govinda Pillai, a veteran Marxist scholar and PKV's classmate, died eight years later on 6 July 2013. The couple are survived by their three sons and two daughters.

Preceded by A. K. Antony	Chief Minister of Kerala; 1978–1979	Succeeded by C.H. Mohammed Koya
