= K. P. R. Gopalan =

Indian politician

Kunnathu Puthiyaveettil Ramapurathu Gopalan (1 June 1906 – 5 August 1997), popularly known as KPR was an Indian politician and a communist leader from Kalliasseri, Kerala. Once a member of the Kerala State Assembly, he lost his seat in the general election of 1 February 1960. He was subsequently re-elected. While a member, he led a failed attempt at armed revolt in the Cannanore area. At one point he was sentenced to death by the colonial authorities, before the sentence was commuted by Charu Chandra Biswas, at the urging of A. K. Gopalan.

Gopalan was one of the founding members of the Communist Party in Kerala in 1940. He, in cooperation with the KPCC, was the main organizer of Morozha protest on 15 September 1940. The protest became violent when police tried to suppress it. One Sub-Inspector and a Constable died in the clash with the mob, mainly constituted of farmers, agricultural labourers, and other trade union workers.

The police caught all prominent leaders, including Gopalan and E. Narayanan Nayanar, the elder brother of E. K. Nayanar, former Kerala Chief Minister for 11 years. The court sentenced all of them to imprisonment and later on appeal, Madras High Court sentenced Gopalan to death. He was sent to Bellary Jail. The verdict attracted wide protest across Kerala and India. Kerala observed a day honoring K.P.R. Gopalan and Mathrubhumi, the leading newspaper wrote an editorial demanding that his death sentence be commuted. Gandhiji was also involved and said it is not acceptable. British communist party protested and the case even received the attention of the British Parliament. Due to this mass protest, the British Government finally reduced the punishment from hanging to life imprisonment. Later, he was released when Congress Interim Government took power in Madras state. Eminent Communist leader P. Krishna Pillai wrote an article hailing Gopalan entitled "The Bolshevik Hero of Kerala". Gopalan died of natural causes on 5 August 1997, aged 91. His niece K. P. Sarada was married to E. K. Nayanar.
