= S. Kumaran =

Indian politician

Member of Parliament of Rajya Sabha
- In office 1970–1982
- Constituency: Kerala

Secretary of the Communist Party of India Kerala State Council
- In office 1968–1970
- Preceded by: C. Achutha Menon
- Succeeded by: N. E. Balaram

Member of legislative assembly
- In office 1960–1964
- Preceded by: Sadasivan C.G
- Succeeded by: S. Damodaran
- Constituency: Mararikulam

Personal details
- Born: 25 February 1923
- Died: 24 December 1991 (aged 68)
- Party: Communist Party of India
- Spouse: Santhambika Devi
- Children: 1 Son, 2 Daughters

S. Kumaran (25 February 1923 – 24 December 1991) was a Punnapra-Vayalar freedom fighter, Communist Party of India leader and former MP (Rajya Sabha) and former Mararikulam MLA.

== Biography ==
He was born in 1923, the son of Kittachan and Kochuparu in Kochuthakidiyil House, Aryaad, Alappuzha. He organized coir factory workers and entered politics and took part in the national freedom struggle, especially the Punnapra-Vayalar struggle. Freedom fighter and Communist party leader Mararikulam MLA the late S.Damodaran Ex. MLA is his brother.

== Political activity ==
- Beginning with the regional action of the State Congress as part of the Quit India Movement.
- Joined the Communist Party of India in 1938
- Joined the State Committee in 1946.
- In 1966, the CPI Became Secretary of State.
