= C. Achutha Menon =

Former chief minister of Kerala

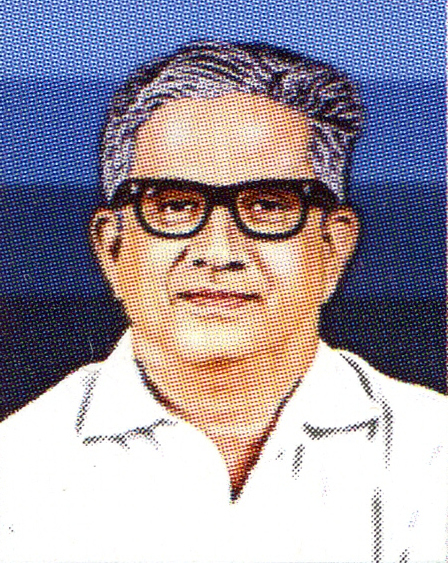

4th Chief Minister of Kerala
- In office 4 October 1970 – 25 March 1977
- Preceded by: President's rule
- Succeeded by: K. Karunakaran
- In office 1 November 1969 – 1 August 1970
- Preceded by: E. M. S. Namboodiripad
- Succeeded by: President's rule

Minister of Finance of Kerala
- In office 5 April 1957 – 31 August 1959
- Chief Minister: E. M. S. Namboodiripad

Member of the Rajya Sabha for Kerala
- In office 1968–1970

Member of Legislative Assembly
- In office 1970–1977
- Constituency: Kodakara
- In office 1970–1970
- Constituency: Kottarakkara
- In office 1960–1964
- In office 1957–1959
- Constituency: Irinjalakuda

Secretary of the Communist Party of India, Kerala State Committee
- In office 1962–1968
- Preceded by: E. M. S. Namboothiripad
- Succeeded by: S. Kumaran
- In office 1949–1956
- Preceded by: P. Krishna Pillai
- Succeeded by: M. N. Govindan Nair

Member of Travancore-Cochin Legislative Assembly
- In office 1952–1953

Personal details
- Born: 13 January 1913 Puthukkad, Kingdom of Cochin, British India
- Died: 16 August 1991 (aged 78) Thiruvananthapuram, Kerala, India
- Party: Communist Party of India
- Spouse: Ammini Amma
- Children: Sathi, Radha, Ramankutty
- Education: Government Law College, Thiruvananthapuram
- As of 26 January, 2009 Source: Legislators of Kerala

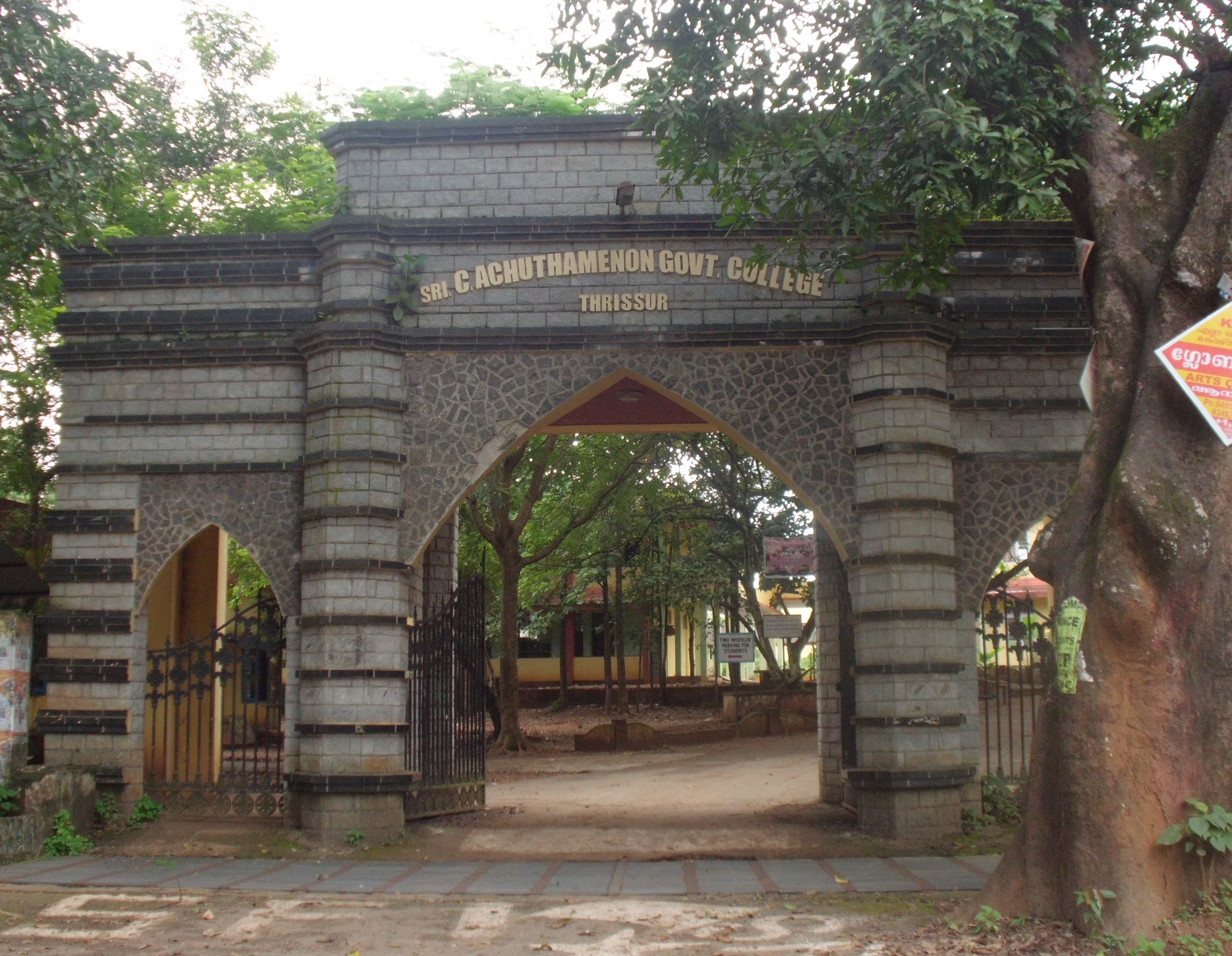
Entrance of C. Achutha Menon Government College, Thrissur

Chelat Achutha Menon (13 January 1913 – 16 August 1991) was an Indian politician and lawyer who served as the 4th Chief Minister of Kerala from November 1969 to August 1970 and again from October 1970 to 1977. He is viewed as one of the most influential Chief Ministers of Kerala.

== Personal life ==
Menon was born in a Hindu Nair family to M. Achutha Menon of the Madathiveettil house and Lekshmykutty Amma of the Chelat house at Puthukkad, Thrissur District on 13 January 1913. Named after his mother, Achutha Menon got his family name, Chelat, through matrilineal succession.

His brother-in-law V. V. Raghavan was also a Communist Party of India politician from Thrissur city, who served as the Minister for Agriculture in the Second Nayanar Ministry. Member of Parliament from Thrissur Lok Sabha constituency, in 1996 and 1998. He was married to Ammini Amma, and had three children including 2 daughters and V. Ramankutty.

== Education ==
Being a brilliant student, he studied on merit scholarship throughout his student life, and stood first in the SSLC examination in the then State of Kochi. He is a former student of Church Mission Society High School, Thrissur (CMSHSS, Thrissur) And after finishing the intermediate level in St. Thomas College, Thrissur, he continued his college education in the St. Joseph's College, Tiruchirappalli Madras. There he won a gold medal for academic excellence and was a role model for other fellow students. Menon, then went on to study Law in Government Law College, Thiruvananthapuram and scored the highest marks in Hindu Law. After the B.L. degree, he started legal practice in various courts of Thrissur, during which time he began to get involved in many social issues.

== Political life ==
Achutha Menon started his political career by associating himself with the State Congress, and actively took part in the Congress meeting held at Thrissur. He subsequently became a member of the Kochi Rajya Prajamandalam political party. He joined the Communist Party of India in 1941 through his involvement in the "Labour Brotherhood" movement. Menon became a Member of the Central Committee of the Communist Party of India and a member of its Executive Committee and Central Secretariat. He continued his political activities, even when the Communist Party was banned. He was imprisoned for many years. The first imprisonment Achutha Menon underwent was in 1940, for one year for making an anti-war speech; and the next in the wake of the "Quit India" movement of 9 August 1942 as a detainee for more than a year. He was forced to evade arrest and live "underground" for more than three years during the period 1948–51.

=== Legislative career ===
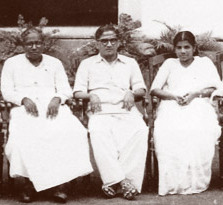
E. M. S. Namboodiripad, C. Achutha Menon and K. R. Gowri Amma in 1957

Achutha Menon was elected to the Travancore–Cochin State Legislature while "underground" in 1952. When Kerala became a separate state in 1956, Menon prepared a pamphlet titled "Towards a more prosperous and plentiful Kerala" in which he displayed his vision for the state. This became the manifesto of the Communist Party in the assembly elections held in 1957. The election resulted in a victory of the Communist Party of India with which Kerala became the second region in the world after San Marino where a communist alliance was democratically elected to power. Menon was elected to the new Kerala Legislative Assembly and subsequently became the first Finance & Agricultural Minister of the state in the ministry headed by E. M. S. Namboodiripad from 1957 to 1959. He presented the first budget of Kerala state on 7 June 1957. As the so-called Liberation Struggle or Vimochanasamaram gained momentum, the Home Minister was deemed unfit to handle the situation and was divested of the crucial portfolio which then was handed over to Menon. He was reelected in 1960. Menon also became a member of the Rajya Sabha from 1968 to 1970.

Election	Constituency	Result	Margin
1957	Irinjalakuda	Won	2660
1960	Irinjalakuda	Won	361
1970	Kottarakkara	Won	26063
1970	Kodakara	Won	3151

=== Split of Communist Party ===
During the Communist Party split, he continued to remain with the CPI. The political instability during the late sixties had paved the way for a realignment in coalition politics, which had far-reaching implication on the political history of the state. He was elected as the State Secretary of C.P.I. too, many times, and was also a member of the National Council of the C.P.I.

=== Chief Minister of Kerala ===
In the 1967 Kerala Legislative Assembly election, his party contested as part of a seven-party alliance named Saptakakshi Munnani. E. M. S. Namboodiripad was sworn in as the Chief Minister but had to resign in 1969 due to internal dissensions within the alliance. Following this, the CPI exited from the coalition and constituted a mini-front that formed the government with external support from Indian National Congress. Achutha Menon was sworn in as Chief Minister on 1 November 1969. Noted as one of the best chief ministers Kerala has had, he continued till the dissolution of the third Kerala Legislative Assembly. The split in the Indian Socialist Party, a coalition partner, and group politics within the Congress party led to the fall of his government on 1 August 1970.

It was under his stewardship that Kerala signed on to continue with the Mullaperiar Dam agreement with Tamil Nadu, as a part of reviewing the pre-independence agreement between the Kingdom of Travancore and the Madras Presidency. Experts on the subject believe this agreement frittered away the interests of Kerala and became the prime reason for the unenviable situation that Kerala finds itself in today in the Mullaperiar issue. He was not a member of the Kerala Assembly then but subsequently got elected from Kottarakkara (State Assembly constituency) in the by-election held in April 1970. In the mid-term poll conducted in 1970, he was again elected this time from Kodakara in Thrissur District and was sworn in as Chief Minister on 4 October 1970 and held office till 1977. Sree Chitra Tirunal Institute for Medical Sciences and Technology, Trivandrum was set up during his period. His ministry continued in power for about seven years and implemented reform measures of basic importance such as the Land Reform Act, the take-over of private forests without compensation, law on agricultural labour, the gratuity of industrial workers, one-lakh housing scheme, etc., not to mention significant steps towards industrialization of Kerala. It was this ministry which enunciated a Science Policy and established a number of "Centres of Excellence" in Scientific research in the state. Many institutions like Keltron and NATPAC were started during his tenure.

Achutha Menon retired from active politics in 1977. He suffered multiple health problems during the final years of his life. He died on 16 August 1991, aged 78, at Sree Chithira Thirunal Hospital in Thiruvananthapuram after suffering from a massive heart attack. Incidentally, the place where he died was set up during his period. He was cremated with full state honours at Thrissur, his hometown.

=== Developmental works ===
He started a lot of institutions for industrialization and inclusive development of Kerala. More than 50 institutions in the fields of science, technology, public health, planning, housing, education, social sciences, geology, forest protection, water management, environment conservation and so on were started.

In the fields of social sciences, research, environment and technology institutions such as Centre for Development Studies, Electronic Research and Development Center (C-DAC Trivandrum), Regional Research Laboratory, National Centre for Earth Science Studies, Kerala Forest Research Institute, Centre for Water Resources Development and Management (CWRDM) were set up during his tenure as chief minister of Kerala.

He pioneered industrial development in Kerala by helping K. P. P. Nambiar set up Kerala State Electronics Development Corporation (KELTRON) in 1973. He was instrumental in bringing Apollo Tyres company to Kerala. The two specialised universities of the state namely the Kerala Agricultural University and Cochin University of Science and Technology were started during his tenure. In the field of health care Sree Chitra Tirunal Institute for Medical Sciences and Technology, Trivandrum was started during his ministry.

The Kerala State Planning Board, constituted by Second Namboodiripad Ministry was strengthened during his period as the chairperson.

The most controversial and discussed decision he has made is the renewal of the Mullaperiyar dam lease contract with Tamil Nadu for 999 years. This decision was denied by two of the Chief Ministers before his tenure as the Chief Minister of Kerala. Tamil Nadu still leads and won the legal battle against the Kerala Government's poor plea on the matter in the Supreme Court with the backup of the lease deed signed by him. This puts his clean image in the shadow of disgrace by the Kerala people worrying about their security.

In 1985, a non-profit organisation named Centre of Science and Technology for Rural Development (COSTFORD) was formed by him along with K. N. Raj and Laurie Baker.

== Literary works ==
A talented writer, Shri. Achutha Menon had authored many books. He wrote many books and articles, mostly related to Marxism, Communism and Indian History. He also translated H.G. Wells' "Brief History of the World" into Malayalam. "Soviet Land", "Kissan Padha Pusthakam", "Keralam – Prasnangalum Sadhyadhakalum", "Smaranayude Edukal", and "Manushyan Swayam Nirmikkunnu" (Translation) are his other famous works. Along with those, he has contributed many noteworthy articles in newspapers and periodicals.

== See also ==
- K. P. P. Nambiar

Preceded by E. M. S. Namboodiripad	Chief Minister of Kerala; 1969–1977	Succeeded by K. Karunakaran
