= P. Krishna Pillai =

Indian Communist politician

Comrade P. Krishna Pillai
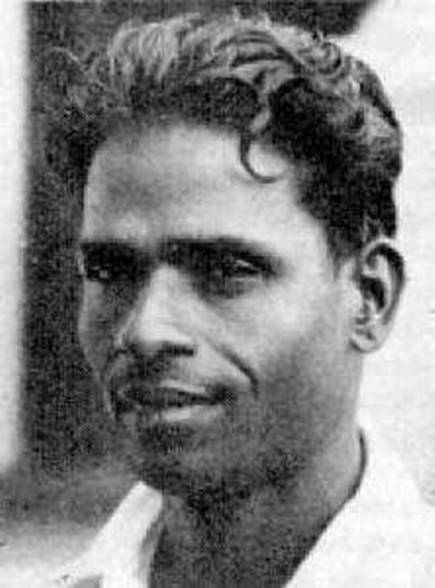

1st Secretary of the Communist Party of India, Kerala State Council
- In office 1942–1948
- Preceded by: Position established
- Succeeded by: C. Achutha Menon

Secretary of the Congress Socialist Party, Kerala
- In office 1934–1939
- Preceded by: Position established
- Succeeded by: Position abolished

Personal details
- Born: 19 August 1906 Vaikom, Kottayam, Travancore
- Died: 19 August 1948 (aged 42) Muhamma, Alleppey, Travancore
- Party: Communist Party of India
- Parents: Narayanan Nair; Parvathy Amma
- Founder of the Communist movement in Kerala

P. Krishna Pillai (19 August 1906 at Vaikom, Kottayam – 19 August 1948 at Muhamma, Alleppey) was a former Indian National Congress leader and communist revolutionary from Kerala, India. He was one of the founding leaders of the Communist Party of India in Kerala, and a poet.

== Early life ==
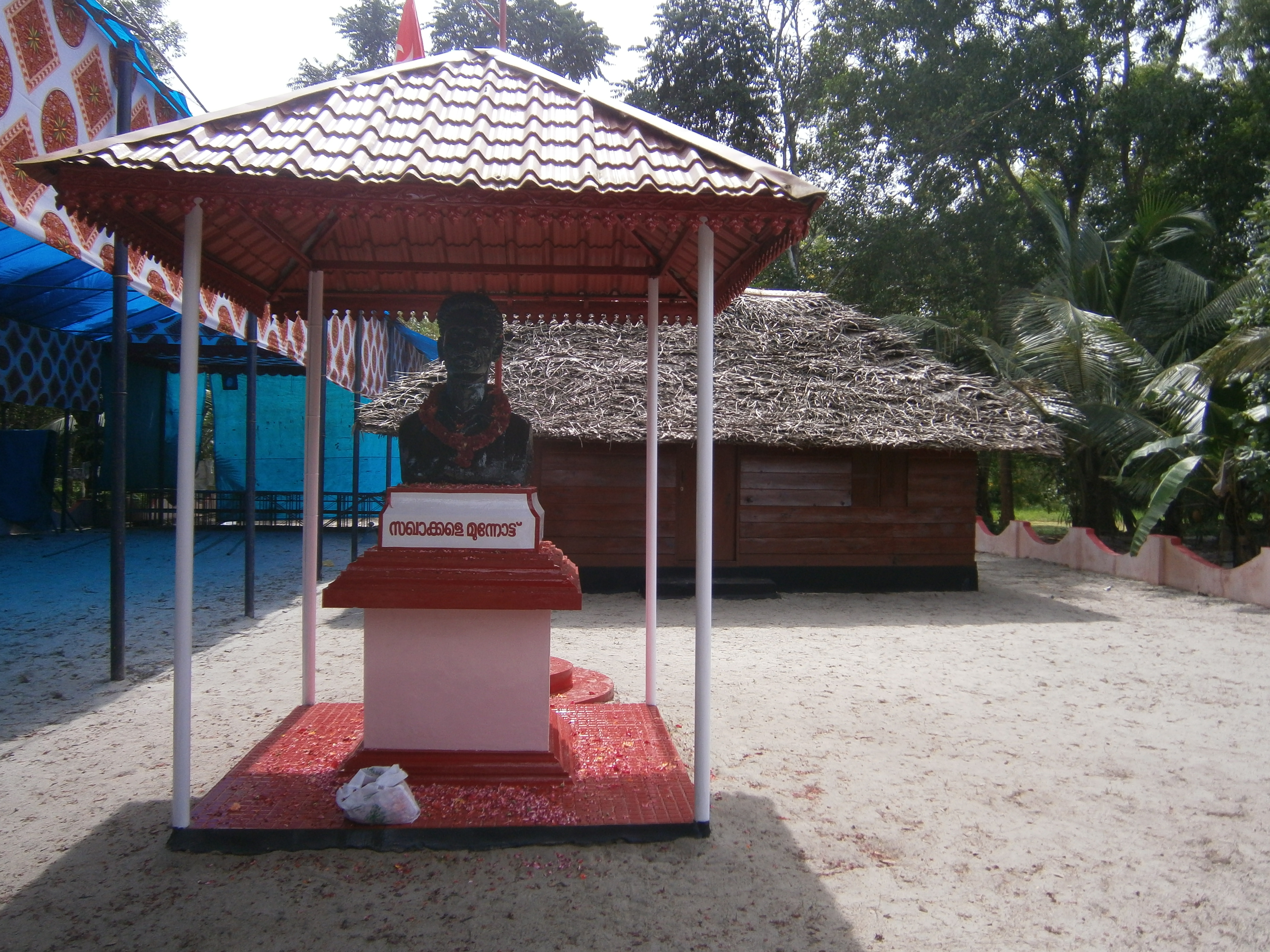
Krishna Pillai Memorial at Chellikandathil House

P. Krishna Pillai was born in a middle-class family of Vaikom. He lost both his parents at an early age and consequently had to drop out of school at the fifth grade. Leaving his home in 1920, he travelled extensively in the north of the Indian subcontinent.

When he returned home two years later, he found Kerala seething with social unrest. Subsequently, he took part in a number of popular movements. He was an active volunteer of Vaikom Satyagraha (1924) and Salt Satyagraha march from Kozhikode to Payyanur (1930).

== Political life ==
Krishna Pillai who began his political life as a Gandhian and a member of the Indian National Congress in his early youth had gradually transformed into a socialist with communist leanings. And when in 1934 Congress Socialist workers formed the Congress Socialist Party in Bombay, Krishna Pillai was appointed its secretary in Kerala, all the while functioning under the banner of the Indian National Congress.

By 1936, Krishna Pillai who until then had concentrated his political activities to the Malabar region now campaigned in the Cochin and Travancore. In 1938, he organized the famous worker's strike in Alappuzha (Alleppey), which turned out to be a great success and one of the inspiring factors behind the Punnapra-Vayalar Struggle of 1946 and the eventual downfall of the rule of C. P. Ramaswami Iyer in Travancore.

The successful transformation of the Malabar unit of the Congress Socialist Party into the Kerala unit of the Communist Party of India (CPI) was mainly due to the untiring work of Krishna Pillai. The Pinarayi Conference officially established the Kerala provincial unit of the CPI under his efforts. Krishna Pillai was chosen as the first state secretary in the conference. The formation of the CPI unit in Kerala was made public on 26 January 1940. He was arrested by the Travancore state police on 9 December 1940 at Vaikom presumably on his way to visit his brother. There was already an arrest warrant against him issued by Madras police in June 1940. The changed attire of Pillai, who was only seen in Khadi till then, rose suspicion in the police. This was an read as an implication of his change from a Gandhian to a communist. G. S. A. Kareem, Inspector General of Travancore police wrote this to D. Crosley, Superintendent of the Malabar police. Subsequently, Krishna Pillai was jailed in Travancore.The lack information about his whereabouts in custody led to widespread agitations. The public feared that he was killed in police custody. Krishna Pillai continued his protest inside the jail against police torture. He was later released in 1942. But, his entry to Malabar was banned for a while.

Years later in 1948 when the CPI accepted the Calcutta Thesis which included in it the express need for an armed struggle against the Indian state, CPI faced a nationwide ban and most of its leaders including Krishna Pillai were forced into hiding.

== Death ==
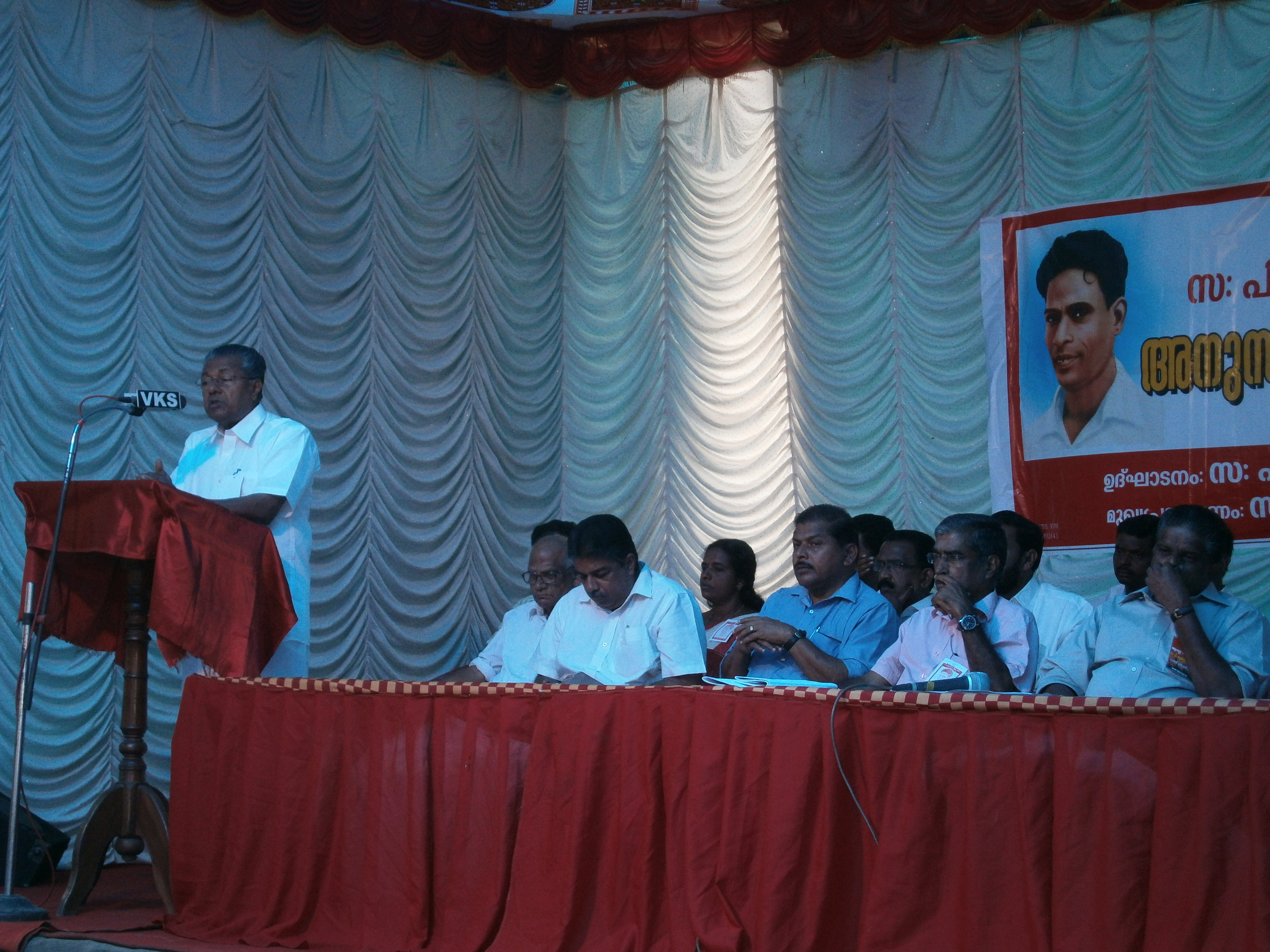
P. Krishna Pillai Memorial Speech by Pinarayi Vijayan on 2013 at Chellikandathil House, Alappuzha

While hiding in a worker's hut in Muhamma, Krishna Pillai sustained a snakebite and succumbed to it, aged just 42.

== In popular culture ==
Samuthirakani portrays Pillai in the 2014 film Vasanthathinte Kanal Vazhikalil and Tamil film Veeravanakkam in 2025 .
