= K. Damodaran =

Indian communist politician, theorist and writer

K Damodaran

Member of Parliament of Rajya Sabha
- In office 1964–1970
- Constituency: Kerala

Personal details
- Born: 5 February 1912
- Died: 3 July 1976 (aged 64)
- Party: Communist Party of India
- Occupation: Communist ideologue, Writer & Politician

Keezhedathu Damodaran (25 February 1912 – 3 July 1976) was an Indian Marxist theoretician, writer and one of the leaders of the Communist Party of India in Kerala, India.

== Early life and education ==
K. Damodaran was born to Kizhakkiniyakath Thuppan Nampoothiri and Keezhedathu Narayani Amma in Ponnani in Malappuram district. He got his family name, Keezhedathu, through matrilineal succession.

Damodaran had his schooling in Government School, Tirur, and college education in Samoothiri College, Calicut. His first socialist activities were associated with being secretary of the student movement 'Kerala Students Movement' and he joined the freedom struggle. He was arrested in 1931 for participating in the civil disobedience movement and sentenced to rigorous imprisonment for 23 months. While in Coimbatore jail, he learned Tamil and Hindi. He went to Kasi (UP) in 1935 to study Sanskrit from the Viswa Vidyalaya there and passed the Shastri examination. While at Kasi he learned Urdu and Bengali and was attracted to Communist ideology.

== Political career ==
Lal Bahadur Shastri was his classmate. He was attracted to Communist ideology through his senior Onkar Nadashasthri. Thus he became a Communist – the first 'Malayalee Communist'. He returned to Kerala in 1937 and joined the Kerala Socialist Party and in May the same year formed the Kerala unit of the Communist Party of India. He organized Coir and Beedi workers. He was imprisoned twice and released in 1945. In 1951, he was elected as the Taluk secretary of the Malabar unit committee of the Communist Party. He contested the assembly election in 1951 and the Loksabha election in 1957. Damodaran was elected to the central executive committee of the party in 1960. He took charge of editing the Navayugam weekly. All through these years he was intellectually active by way of writing articles and books, learning new languages and debating on various forums.

He became a Rajya sabha member (MP) in 1964. He visited many Asian and European countries including almost all of the communist nations. After the tenure, he devoted his time to a comprehensive research on the history of the Party at (JNU) under an ICHR fellowship. He was the first progressive writer in Malayalam. 'pattabakki' was the first political drama to be staged in Kerala which, in a way, paved the way for the advancement of communist ideology among the common people. He dwelled deep into Indian Philosophy which was considered solely spiritual until then and discovered new streams of material thoughts in it. His celebrated works 'Bharatheeya Chintha' and 'Indiayude athmavu' speaks volumes of the metamorphosis. He was a multilinguist and could speak for hours on thought provoking subjects.

He died on July 3, 1976, in Delhi at the Safdarjung Hospital while he was still conducting this research. Damodaran was a multilingual scholar and translated many books from Russian to Malayalam. Apart from Pattabaakki, he wrote another play named Rakthapanam. The stories written between 1934 and 1935 are now a collection known as Kannuneer. In all his works, party popularization was seen. The best known of his works is Indiyude Atmavu and in English, an excellent exposition of 'Indian Culture' and 'Philosophy from the ancient times'. He completed only first part of Kerala History based on archeology, anthropology and coin sciences.

His critical insights on the global Communist movement, and particularly the Indian Communist movement, were thoroughly discussed in an interview conducted by Tariq Ali in 1975, which was published in New Left Review, Sept.-Oct. 1975).

== Works ==
=== In Malayalam ===
- Jawaharlal Nehru
- Eka Vazhi
- Kannuneer (short stories)
- Karl Marx
- Samashtivada Vijnapanam (translation of the Communist Manifesto)
- Paattabaakki (play)
- Rakthapaanam (play)
- Russian viplavam (co-authored with E. M. S. Namboodiripad)
- Manushyan
- Dhanasasthrapravesika
- Uruppika
- Nanayaprasnam
- Communism Enthu Enthinu ?
- Purogamana sahithyam Enthinu?
- Communisavum Christhumathavum
- Marxism (in 10 parts)
- Indiayude Aathmavu
- Keralathile Swathanthryasamaram (co-authored with C Narayana pillai)
- Dhanasasthra thathwangal
- Dharmikamoolyangal
- Enthanu saahithyam
- Chinayile Viplavam
- Keralacharithram
- Sahithya niroopanam
- Indiayum Socialisavum
- Indiayude Sampathikabhivrudhi
- Innathe Indiayude Sampathikasthithi
- Yesuchristhu Moscowil
- SamoohyaParivarthanangal
- Socialisavum Communisavum
- Panam Muthal Nayapaisa Vare
- Indiayile Deseeyaprasthanam(Translated directly from Russian)
- Marxisathinte Adisthanathathwangal
- Bharatheeyachintha
- Sreesankaran Hegel Marx
- Oru Indian Communistinte Ormakkurippukal

=== In English ===
- Indian Thought
- Man and Society in Indian Philosophy
- Marx Hegel and Sreesankara
- Marx Comes to India (co-authored with P.C.Joshi)

=== In Hindi ===
- Bharatheeya chinthaa parampara
