= List of former constituencies of the Kerala Legislative Assembly =

The Kerala Legislative Assembly, popularly known as the Niyamasabha (lit. 'Law Council'), is the State Assembly of Kerala. In 1956, the State of Kerala was formed on linguistic basis, merging Travancore, Cochin, Malabar regions, and the Kasaragod Taluk of South Canara. Delimitation of the assembly constituencies happened many times. Initially there were 114 assembly constituencies. In 1965 it increased to 133. Again it was increased to 140 in 1977. Currently Kerala has 140 assembly constituencies and 20 Loksabha constituencies.

During these delimitation processes some of the constituencies become defunct and some are newly added.

== Parties ==
Abbreviation	Party Name	
CPI	Party Name	Communist Party of India
INC	Indian National Congress state unit (KPCC)	
KC	Kerala Congress	
ML	Indian Union Muslim League	
PSP	Praja Socialist Party	
SSP	Samyukta Socialist Party	
KTP	Karshaka Thozhilali Party	
ASP		
CPI(M)	Communist Party of India (Marxist)	

== Kerala Niyamasabha ==
=== 1957-1960 ===
Constituency	Year of Election	Representative	Party	Notes
Andathodu	1957	K. Govindankutty Menon	CPI	
Andathodu	1960	B. V. Seethi Thangal	ML	
Chevayur	1957	A. Balagopalan	INC	
Chevayur	1960	P. C. Raghavan Nair	CPI	
Elapully	1957	A. K. Ramankutty	CPI	
Elapully	1960	A. K. Ramankutty	CPI	
Kanayannur	1957	T. K. Ramakrishnan	CPI	
Kanayannur	1960	T. K. Ramakrishnan	CPI	
Cannanore I	1957	C. Kannan	CPI	
Cannanore I	1960	R. Sankar	INC	
Cannanore II	1957	K. P. Gopalan	CPI	
Cannanore II	1960	P. Madhavan	INC	
Karikode	1957	Kusuman Joseph (F)	INC	
Karikode	1960	Kosumom Joseph (F)	INC	
Karthigapally	1957	R. Sugathan R	CPI	
Karthigapally	1960	R. Sugathan	CPI	
Kothakulangara	1957	M. A. Anthony	INC	
Kothakulangara	1960	M. A. Antony	INC	
Meenachil	1957	P. M. Joseph	INC	
Meenachil	1960	P. T. Chacko	INC	
Parli	1957	C. K. Narayanan Kutty	CPI	
Parli	1960	A. R. Menon	CPI	Expired
Parli	1960	M.V.Vasu	CPI	Bypolls in 1960
Puliyannur	1957	Joseph Chazhikatt	PSP	
Puliyannur	1960	Joseph Chazhikatt	PSP	
Ramamangalam	1957	E. P. Poulose	INC	
Ramamangalam	1960	E. P. Poulose	INC	
Thakazhi	1957	Thomas John	INC	
Thakazhi	1960	Thomas John	INC	
Thrikkadavur	1957	T. Krishnan	INC	General
Thrikkadavur	1957	K. Karunakaran	CPI	Reserved
Thrikkadavur	1960	C. M. Stephen	INC	General
Thrikkadavur	1960	T. Krishnan	INC	Reserved
Ulloor	1957	V. Sreedharan	CPI	
Ulloor	1960	M. Alikunju Sastri	PSP	
Wayanad	1957	N. K. Kunjikrishnan Nair	INC	General
Wayanad	1957	V. Madura	INC	Reserved
Wayanad	1960	P. C. Balakrishnan Nambiar	INC	General
Wayanad	1960	V. Madura	INC	Reserved

=== 1965-1970 ===
Constituency	Year of Election	Representative	Party	Notes
Akalakunnam	1965	J. A. Chacko	KC	
Akalakunnam	1967	J. A. Chacko	KC	
Akalakunnam	1970	J. A. Chacko	KC	
Karimannoor	1965	Chacko Kuriakose		
Karimannoor	1967	M. M. Thomas	KTP	
Karimannoor	1970	A. C. Chacko	KC	
South Wayanad	1965	M Ramunni	SSP	
South Wayanad	1967	M. Ramunni	SSP	
South Wayanad	1970	K. Raghavan Master	INC	
Madayi	1957	K. P. R. Gopalan	CPI	
Madayi	1960	P. Gopalan	INC	
Madayi	1965	K.P.R. Gopalan	CPI(M)	
Madayi	1967	Mathai Manjuran	KSP	Expired
Madayi	1967	John Manjuran	KSP	Bypolls 1970
Madayi	1970	M. V. Raghavan	CPI(M)	

=== 1957-1970 ===
Constituency	Year of Election	Representative	Party	Notes
Krishnapuram	1957	Karthikeyan G.	CPI	
Krishnapuram	1960	P. K. Kunju	PSP	
Krishnapuram	1965	M. K. Hemachandran	INC	
Krishnapuram	1967	P . U . Pillai	CPI	
Krishnapuram	1970	P. Unnikrishnan Pillai	CPI	
Nileswar	1957	Kallalan	CPI	Reserved
Nileswar	1957	E. M. S. Namboodiripad	CPI	General. Chief Minister
Nileswar	1960	O. Koran	SSP	Reserved
Nileswar	1960	C. Kunhikrishnan Nair	INC	General
Nileswar	1965	V.V. Kunhamboo	CPI(M)	
Nileswar	1967	V. V. Kunhambu	CPI(M)	
Nileswar	1970	V. V. Kunhambu	CPI(M)	
Trivandrum I	1957	Eapan E. P.	PSP	
Trivandrum I	1960	B. P. Eapen	PSP	
Trivandrum I	1965	B. Madhavan Nair	SSP	
Trivandrum I	1967	B. M. Nair	SSP	
Trivandrum I	1970	N. Gopala Pillai	PSP	
Trivandrum II	1957	Pattom Thanupillai	PSP	
Trivandrum II	1960	Pattom Thanupillai	PSP	Resigned
Trivandrum II	1960	K. Anirudhan	CPI	Bypolls 1963
Trivandrum II	1965	Wilfred Sebastian	INC	
Trivandrum II	1967	K. C.Vamadevan	IND	
Trivandrum II	1970	K. Pankajakshan	RSP	
Vilappil	1957	Sreedhar G. Ponnara	PSP	
Vilappil	1960	Ponnara G. Sreedhar	PSP	
Vilappil	1965	M. Bhaskarannair	INC	
Vilappil	1967	C. S. N. Nair	SSP	
Vilappil	1970	S. Varadarajan Nair	INC	

=== 1977-2006 ===
Constituency	Year of Election	Representative	Party	Notes
Cherpu	1977	K.P. Prabhakaran	CPI	
Cherpu	1980	K.P. Prabhakaran	CPI	
Cherpu	1982	K.P. Prabhakaran	CPI	
Cherpu	1987	V. V. Raghavan	CPI	
Cherpu	1991	V. V. Raghavan	CPI	
Cherpu	1996	K. P. Rajendran	CPI	
Cherpu	2001	K. P. Rajendran	CPI	
Cherpu	2006	V. S. Sunil Kumar	CPI	
Neduvathur	1977	Bhargavi Thankappan	CPI	
Neduvathur	1980	C. K. Thankappan	CPI(M)	
Neduvathur	1982	C. K. Thankappan	CPI(M)	
Neduvathur	1987	B. Raghavan	CPI(M)	
Neduvathur	1991	B. Raghavan	CPI(M)	
Neduvathur	1996	Ezhukone Narayanan	INC	
Neduvathur	2001	Ezhukone Narayanan	INC	
Neduvathur	2006	B. Raghavan	CPI(M)	
Trivandrum East	1977	P. Narayanan Nair	IND	
Trivandrum East	1980	C. S. Neelakantan Nair	IND	
Trivandrum East	1982	C. S. Neelakantan Nair	IND	
Trivandrum East	1987	K. Sankaranarayana Pillai	ICS(SCS)	
Trivandrum East	1991	B. Vijaya Kumar	INC	
Trivandrum East	1996	B.Vijaya Kumar	INC	
Trivandrum East	2001	B. Vijayakumar	INC	
Trivandrum East	2006	V Sivankutty	CPI(M)	
Trivandrum North	1977	K. Raveendran Nair	IND	
Trivandrum North	1980	K. Anirudhan	CPI(M)	
Trivandrum North	1982	K. Anirudhan	CPI(M)	
Trivandrum North	1987	M. Vijayakumar	CPI(M)	
Trivandrum North	1991	M. Vijayakumar	CPI(M)	
Trivandrum North	1996	M. Vijayakumar	CPI(M)	
Trivandrum North	2001	Adv K.Mohankumar	INC	
Trivandrum North	2006	M. Vijayakumar	CPI(M)	
Trivandrum West	1977	K. Pankajakshan	RSP	
Trivandrum West	1980	P. A. Mohemmed Kannu	MUL	
Trivandrum West	1982	P. A. Mohemmed Kannu	MUL	
Trivandrum West	1987	M. M. Hassan	INC	
Trivandrum West	1991	M. M. Hassan	INC	
Trivandrum West	1996	Antony Raju	KEC	
Trivandrum West	2001	M.V. Raghavan	CMP	
Trivandrum West	2006	V. Surendran Pillai	KEC	

=== 1965-2006 ===
Constituency	Year of Election	Representative	Party	Notes
Edakkad	1965	C. Kannan	CPI(M)	
Edakkad	1967	C. Kannan	CPI(M)	
Edakkad	1970	N Ramakrishnan	INC	
Edakkad	1977	P. P. V. Moosa	MLO	
Edakkad	1980	P. P. V. Moosa	IML	
Edakkad	1982	P. P. V. Moosa	IML	
Edakkad	1987	O. Bharathan	CPI(M)	
Edakkad	1991	O. Bharathan	CPI(M)	
Edakkad	1996	M. V. Jayarajan	CPI(M)	
Edakkad	2001	M. V. Jayarajan	CPI(M)	
Edakkad	2006	Kadannappalli Ramachandran	C(S)	
Kilimanoor	1965	C. K. Balakrishnan	CPI(M)	
Kilimanoor	1967	C.K.Balakrishnan	CPI(M)	
Kilimanoor	1970	P. K. Chathan Master	CPI	
Kilimanoor	1977	P. K. Chathan Master	CPI	
Kilimanoor	1980	Bhargavi Thankappan	CPI	
Kilimanoor	1982	Bhargavi Thankappan	CPI	
Kilimanoor	1987	Bhargavi Thankappan	CPI	
Kilimanoor	1991	N. Rajan	CPI	
Kilimanoor	1996	Bhargavi Thankappan	CPI	
Kilimanoor	2001	N. Rajan	CPI	
Kilimanoor	2006	N Rajan	CPI	
Kodakara	1965	P. S. Namboodiri	CPI	
Kodakara	1967	P.S. Namboodiri	CPI	
Kodakara	1970	C. Achutha Menon	CPI	Chief Minister
Kodakara	1977	Lonappan Nambadan	KEC	
Kodakara	1980	Lonappan Nambadan	KEC	
Kodakara	1982	Lonappan Nambadan	KEC	
Kodakara	1987	K. P. Viswanathan	INC	
Kodakara	1991	K.P. Viswanathan	INC	
Kodakara	1996	K.P.Viswanathan	INC	
Kodakara	2001	K.P. Viswanathan	INC	
Kodakara	2006	C. Raveendranath	CPI(M)	
Kollengode	1965	C. Vasudeva Menon	CPI(M)	
Kollengode	1967	C.V.Menon	CPI(M)	
Kollengode	1970	C. Vasudeva Menon	CPI(M)	
Kollengode	1977	C. Vasudeva Menon	CPI(M)	
Kollengode	1980	C. Vasudeva Menon	CPI(M)	
Kollengode	1982	C. Vasudeva Menon	CPI(M)	
Kollengode	1987	C. T. Krishnan	CPI(M)	
Kollengode	1991	T. Chathu	CPI(M)	
Kollengode	1996	K.A.Chandran	INC	
Kollengode	2001	K.A.Chandran	INC	
Kollengode	2006	V. Chenthamarakshan	CPI(M)	
Mala	1965	K. Karunakaran	INC	
Mala	1967	K. Karunakaran	INC	
Mala	1970	K. Karunakaran	INC	
Mala	1977	K. Karunakaran	INC	Chief Minister
Mala	1980	K. Karunakaran	INC(I)	Chief Minister
Mala	1982	K. Karunakaran	INC(I)	Chief Minister
Mala	1987	K. Karunakaran	INC	
Mala	1991	K. Karunakaran	INC	Chief Minister. Resigned in 1995.
Mala	1991	W. S. Sasi	CPI	Bypolls 1996
Mala	1996	V.K.Rajan	CPI	
Mala	2001	T.U. Radhakrishnan	INC	
Mala	2006	A K Chandran	CPI	
Meppayur	1965	M.K Kelu	CPI(M)	
Meppayur	1967	M. K. Kelu	CPI(M)	
Meppayur	1970	A. V. Abdurahiman	MUL	
Meppayur	1977	Panarath Kunhimohammed	MUL	
Meppayur	1980	A. V. Abdulurahiman Haji	IML	
Meppayur	1982	A. V. Abdulurahiman Haji	IML	
Meppayur	1987	A.Kanaran	CPI(M)	
Meppayur	1991	A. Kanaran	CPI(M)	
Meppayur	1996	A.Kanaran	CPI(M)	
Meppayur	2001	Mathai Chacko	CPI(M)	
Meppayur	2006	K K Lathika	CPI(M)	
North Wayanad	1980	M. V. Rajan Master	INC(I)	
North Wayanad	2001	Radha Raghavan	INC	
North Wayanad	1965	K.K. Annan	IND	
North Wayanad	1967	K. K. Annan	CPI(M)	
North Wayanad	1970	M. V. Rajan	INC	
North Wayanad	1977	M. V. Rajan	INC	
North Wayanad	1982	M. V. Rajan Master	INC(I)	
North Wayanad	1987	K.Raghvan Master	INC	
North Wayanad	1991	K. Raghavan Master	INC	
North Wayanad	1996	Radha Raghavan	INC	
North Wayanad	2006	K C Kunhiraman	CPI(M)	
Pandalam	1965	P. K. Kunjachan	CPI(M)	
Pandalam	1967	P . K . Kunjachan	CPI(M)	
Pandalam	1970	Damodaran Kalassery	INC	
Pandalam	1977	Damodaran Kalassery	INC	
Pandalam	1980	P. K. Velayudhan	INC(U)	
Pandalam	1982	P. K. Velayudhan	INC(A)	
Pandalam	1987	V. Kesevan	CPI(M)	
Pandalam	1991	V. Kisavan	CPI(M)	
Pandalam	1996	P.K.Kumaran	CPI(M)	
Pandalam	2001	K.K. Shaju	JPSS	
Pandalam	2006	K.K.Shaju	JPSS	
Peringalam	1965	P. Ramunni Kurup	SSP	
Peringalam	1967	P. R. Kurup	SSP	
Peringalam	1970	Soopi K. M.	ISP	
Peringalam	1977	P. R. Karup	INC	
Peringalam	1980	A. K. Saseendran	INC(U)	
Peringalam	1982	A. K. Saseendran	INC(A)	
Peringalam	1987	P. R. Kurup	JNP	
Peringalam	1991	K.M. Sooppy	MUL	
Peringalam	1996	P.R.Kurup	JD	
Peringalam	2001	K.P. Mohanan	JD(S)	
Peringalam	2006	K P Mohanan	JD(S)	
Sreekrishnapuram	1965	C. Govinda Panicker	CPI(M)	
Sreekrishnapuram	1967	C.G.Panicker	CPI(M)	
Sreekrishnapuram	1970	C. Govinda Panicker	CPI(M)	
Sreekrishnapuram	1977	K. Sukumaranunni	INC	
Sreekrishnapuram	1980	K. Sankaranarayanan	INC(I)	
Sreekrishnapuram	1982	K. Sankaranarayanan	INC(I)	
Sreekrishnapuram	1987	P. Balan	INC	
Sreekrishnapuram	1991	P. Balan	INC	
Sreekrishnapuram	1996	Girija Surendran	CPI(M)	
Sreekrishnapuram	2001	Girija Surendran	CPI(M)	
Sreekrishnapuram	2006	K.S. Saleeka	CPI(M)	

=== 1957-2006 ===
Constituency	Year of Election	Representative	Party	Notes
Ariyanad	1957	Balakrishna Pillai R.	CPI	
Ariyanad	1960	Antony Dcruz	PSP	
Ariyanad	1965	V. Sankaran	INC	
Ariyanad	1967	M. Majeed	SSP	
Ariyanad	1970	Soma Sekharan Nair	SOP	
Ariyanad	1977	K. C. Vamadevan	RSP	
Ariyanad	1980	K. Pankajakshan	RSP	
Ariyanad	1982	K. Pankajakshan	RSP	
Ariyanad	1987	K. Pankajakshan	RSP	
Ariyanad	1991	G. Karihikeyan	INC	
Ariyanad	1996	G.Karthikeyan	INC	
Ariyanad	2001	G. Karthikeyan	INC	
Ariyanad	2006	G Karthikeyan Aryanad	INC	
Hosdurg	1957	Chandraskharan K.	PSP	
Hosdurg	1960	K. Chandrasekharan	PSP	
Hosdurg	1965	N.K. Balakrishnan	SSP	
Hosdurg	1967	N. K. Balakrishnan	SSP	
Hosdurg	1970	N. K. Balakrishnan	PSP	
Hosdurg	1977	K. T. Kumaran	CPI	
Hosdurg	1980	K. T. Kumaran	CPI	
Hosdurg	1982	K. T. Kumaran	CPI	
Hosdurg	1987	N. Manoharan Master	INC	
Hosdurg	1991	M. Narayanan	CPI	
Hosdurg	1996	M. Narayanan	CPI	
Hosdurg	2001	M. Kumaran	CPI	
Hosdurg	2006	Pallipram Balan	CPI	
Kallooppara	1957	M. M. Mathai	INC	
Kallooppara	1960	M. M. Mathai	INC	
Kallooppara	1965	George Thomas	KC	
Kallooppara	1967	G.Thomas	INC	
Kallooppara	1970	T. S. John	KEC	
Kallooppara	1977	T.S. John	KEC	
Kallooppara	1980	K. A. Mathew	KCJ	
Kallooppara	1982	K. A. Mathew	KCJ	
Kallooppara	1987	C. A. Mathew	ICS(SCS)	
Kallooppara	1991	Joseph M. Puthussery	IND	
Kallooppara	1996	T.S.John	KEC	
Kallooppara	2001	Joseph M Puthussery	KEC(M)	
Kallooppara	2006	Joseph M Puthusseri	KEC(M)	
Kozhikode- I	1957	Sarada Krishnan	INC	
Kozhikode- I	1960	O. T. Sarada Krishnan	INC	
Kozhikode- I	1965	P.C. Raghavan Nair	CPI(M)	
Kozhikode- I	1967	P. C. R. Nair	CPI(M)	
Kozhikode- I	1970	P. V. Sankana Narayanan	INC	
Kozhikode- I	1977	N. Chandrasekhara Kurup	CPI(M)	
Kozhikode- I	1980	N. Chandrasekhara Kurup	CPI(M)	
Kozhikode- I	1982	N. Chandrasekhara Kurup	CPI(M)	
Kozhikode- I	1987	M. Dasan	CPI(M)	
Kozhikode- I	1991	A. Sujana Pal	INC	
Kozhikode- I	1996	M.Dasan	CPI(M)	
Kozhikode- I	2001	Adv. A. Sujana Pal	INC	
Kozhikode- I	2006	A Pradeep Kumar	CPI(M)	
Kozhikode- II	1957	Kumaran P.	INC	
Kozhikode- II	1960	P. Kumaran	INC	
Kozhikode- II	1965	P.M. Aboobacker	IND	
Kozhikode- II	1967	P.M.Abubacker	MUL	
Kozhikode- II	1970	Kalpally Madhava Menon	IND	
Kozhikode- II	1977	P. M. Aboobacker	MLO	
Kozhikode- II	1980	P. M. Abubackar	IML	
Kozhikode- II	1982	P. M. Abubackar	IML	
Kozhikode- II	1987	C.P. Kunhu	CPI(M)	
Kozhikode- II	1991	M.K. Muneer	MUL	
Kozhikode- II	1996	Elamaram Kareem	CPI(M)	
Kozhikode- II	2001	T.P.M Zahir	IUML	
Kozhikode- II	2006	Advocate P M A Salam	INL	
Kuttippuram	1957	Ahamedkutty C.	IND	
Kuttippuram	1960	Seethi Sahib	ML	
Kuttippuram	1965	Mohisin Bin Ahamed	ML	
Kuttippuram	1967	C. M. Kutty	MUL	
Kuttippuram	1970	Chakkeri Ahammed Kutty	MUL	
Kuttippuram	1977	Chakeri Ahmedkutty	MUL	
Kuttippuram	1980	Korambayil Ahammed Haji	MUL	
Kuttippuram	1982	Korambayil Ahammed Haji	MUL	
Kuttippuram	1987	Korambavil Ahamed Haji	MUL	
Kuttippuram	1991	P.K. Kunhalikutty	MUL	
Kuttippuram	1996	P.K. Kunhalikutty	IUML	
Kuttippuram	2001	P.K.Kunhalikutty	IUML	
Kuttippuram	2006	K.T Jaleel	IND	
Kuzhalmannam	1957	John Kuduvakkotte	IND	
Kuzhalmannam	1960	Kuduvakottu John	CPI	
Kuzhalmannam	1965	O. Koran	SSP	
Kuzhalmannam	1967	O.Koran	SSP	
Kuzhalmannam	1970	P. Kunhan	CPI(M)	
Kuzhalmannam	1977	M. K. Krishnan	CPI(M)	
Kuzhalmannam	1980	T. K. Arumughan	CPI(M)	
Kuzhalmannam	1982	T. K. Arumughan	CPI(M)	
Kuzhalmannam	1987	T. K. Arumughan	CPI(M)	
Kuzhalmannam	1991	M. Naryannan	CPI(M)	
Kuzhalmannam	1996	M.Narayanan	CPI(M)	
Kuzhalmannam	2001	A.K.Balan	CPI(M)	
Kuzhalmannam	2006	A.K. Balan	CPI(M)	
Mararikulam	1957	Sadasivan C. G.	CPI	
Mararikulam	1960	S. Kumaran	CPI	
Mararikulam	1965	Suseela Gopalan	CPI(M)	
Mararikulam	1967	S . Damodaran	CPI(M)	
Mararikulam	1970	S. Damodaran	CPI(M)	
Mararikulam	1977	A. V. Thamarakshan	RSP	
Mararikulam	1980	A. V. Thamarakshan	RSP	
Mararikulam	1982	A. V. Thamarakshan	RSP	
Mararikulam	1987	T. J. Anjalose	CPI(M)	
Mararikulam	1991	V.S. Achuthanandan	CPI(M)	
Mararikulam	1996	Vijayamma. S	INC	
Mararikulam	2001	Vijayamma. S	INC	
Mararikulam	2006	Dr.Thomas Issac	CPI(M)	
Mattancherry	1957	Viswanathan K. K.	INC	
Mattancherry	1960	K. K. Viswanathan	INC	
Mattancherry	1965	M. P. Muhamed Jaferkhan	IND	
Mattancherry	1967	M . P . M . Jafferkhan	MUL	
Mattancherry	1970	K. J. Hersehal	IND	
Mattancherry	1977	K. J. Harschel	BLD	
Mattancherry	1980	M. J. Zakaria	IML	
Mattancherry	1982	M. J. Zakaria	IML	
Mattancherry	1987	M.J. Zakaria	MUL	
Mattancherry	1991	M.J. Zakaria	MUL[22]	
Mattancherry	1996	M.A.Thomas	IND	
Mattancherry	2001	V K Ebrahim Kunju	IUML	
Mattancherry	2006	V K Ibrahim Kunju	IUML	
Narakkal	1957	K. C. Abraham	INC	
Narakkal	1960	K. C. Abraham	INC	
Narakkal	1965	K. C. Abraham	INC	
Narakkal	1967	A . S . Purushothaman	CPI(M)	
Narakkal	1970	M. K. Raghavan	INC	
Narakkal	1977	T. A. Paraman	RSP	
Narakkal	1980	M. K. Krishnan	CPI(M)	
Narakkal	1982	M. K. Krishnan	CPI(M)	
Narakkal	1987	K.K. Madhavan	ICS(SCS)	
Narakkal	1991	K. Kunjambu	INC	Expired
Narakkal	1991	V.K.Babu	INC	Bypolls 1992
Narakkal	1996	M.A.Kuttappan	INC	
Narakkal	2001	Dr. M A Kuttappan	INC	
Narakkal	2006	M K Purushothaman	CPI(M)	
Palluruthy	1957	Alexander Parambithar	INC	
Palluruthy	1960	Alexander Parambithara	INC	
Palluruthy	1965	P. Gangadharan	CPI(M)	
Palluruthy	1967	P . Gangadharan	CPI(M)	
Palluruthy	1970	B. Wellingdan	IND	
Palluruthy	1977	Eapen Varghese	KEC	
Palluruthy	1980	T. P. Peethambaran Master	INC(U)	
Palluruthy	1982	T. P. Peethambaran Master	INC(A)	
Palluruthy	1987	T.P, Peethambaran Master	ICS(SCS)	
Palluruthy	1991	Dominic Presentation	INC	
Palluruthy	1996	Dominic Presentation	INC	
Palluruthy	2001	Dominic Presentation	INC	
Palluruthy	2006	C M Dinesh Mani	CPI(M)	
Parur	1957	Sivan Pillai N.	CPI	
Parur	1960	K. A. Damodara Menon	INC	
Parur	1965	K. T. George	INC	
Parur	1967	K . T . George	INC	
Parur	1970	K. T. George	INC	
Parur	1977	Xavier Arakkal	INC	
Parur	1980	A. C. Jose	INC(U)	
Parur	1982	N. Sivan Pillai	CPI	Election set aside by SC in 1984.
Parur	1982	A.C.Jose	INC	Bypolls in 1984
Parur	1987	N. Sivan Pillai	CPI	
Parur	1991	P.Raju	CPI	
Parur	1996	P.Raju	CPI	
Parur	2001	Adv. V.D. Satheesan	INC	
Parur	2006	Adv. V D Satheesan	INC	
Pathanamthitta	1957	Bhaskara Pillai P.	CPI	
Pathanamthitta	1960	C. K. Harichandran Nair	PSP	
Pathanamthitta	1965	V. I. Idiculla	KC	
Pathanamthitta	1967	K . K . Nair	IND	
Pathanamthitta	1970	K. K. Nair	IND	
Pathanamthitta	1977	George Mathew	KEC	
Pathanamthitta	1980	K. K. Nair	IND	
Pathanamthitta	1982	K. K. Nair	IND	
Pathanamthitta	1987	K. K. Nair	IND	
Pathanamthitta	1991	K.K. Nair	IND	
Pathanamthitta	1996	K.K.Nair	INC	
Pathanamthitta	2001	K.K. Nair	INC	
Pathanamthitta	2006	Adv. K Sivadasan Nair	INC	
Vadakkekara	1957	Balan K. A.	CPI	
Vadakkekara	1960	K. R. Vijayan	INC	
Vadakkekara	1965	Abdul Jaleel	IND	
Vadakkekara	1967	E . Balanandan	CPI(M)	
Vadakkekara	1970	Balauandan	CPI(M)	
Vadakkekara	1977	T. K. Abdu	CPI(M)	
Vadakkekara	1980	T. K. Abdu	CPI(M)	
Vadakkekara	1982	T. K. Abdu	CPI(M)	
Vadakkekara	1987	S. Sarma	CPI(M)	
Vadakkekara	1991	S. Sarma	CPI(M)	
Vadakkekara	1996	S.Sarma	CPI(M)	
Vadakkekara	2001	M.A. Chndrasekharan	INC	
Vadakkekara	2006	S Sharma	CPI(M)	
Vazhoor	1957	Chacko P. T.	INC	
Vazhoor	1960	Velappan	INC	
Vazhoor	1965	K. Narayana Kurup	KC	
Vazhoor	1967	K . P . Pillai	CPI	
Vazhoor	1970	K. Narayana Kurup	KEC	
Vazhoor	1977	K. Narayana Kurup	KEC	
Vazhoor	1980	M. K. Joseph	KEC	
Vazhoor	1982	Kanam Rajendran	CPI	
Vazhoor	1987	Kanam Rajendran	CPI	
Vazhoor	1991	K. Narayana Karup	KCM	
Vazhoor	1996	K.Narayana Kurup	KEC(M)	
Vazhoor	2001	K Narayanakurup	KEC(M)	
Vazhoor	2006	Jayarajan	KEC(M)	
