= List of constituencies of the Kerala Legislative Assembly =

Constituencies of the Kerala Legislative Assembly

Kerala Legislative Assembly Kerala Niyamasabha
- 15th Kerala Assembly

Type
- Type: Unicameral
- Term limits: 5 years
- Seats: 140

Elections
- Voting system: First past the post
- Last election: 2026

Meeting place
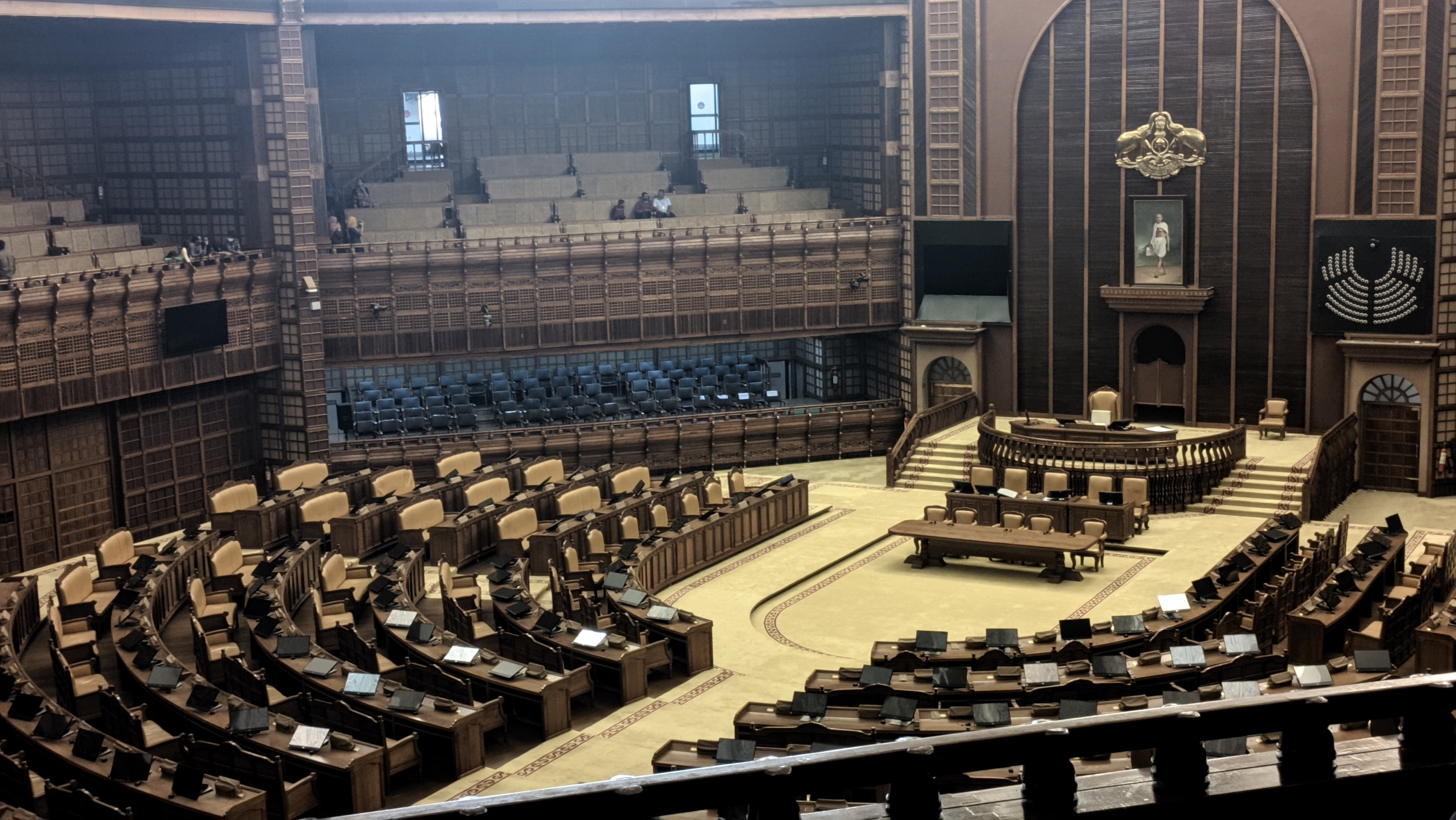
- Niyamasabha Mandiram in Thiruvananthapuram

Website
- www.niyamasabha.org

Location of Kerala (highlighted in red) within India

The Kerala Legislative Assembly is the unicameral legislature of the state of Kerala in South India. Its seat is at Thiruvananthapuram, the capital of the state, and the assembly sits for a term of five years unless dissolved early. (Note: A Legislative Assembly can be dissolved early, under Article 174 of the Indian Constitution, in a few situations including a hung assembly and the inability of any alliance to form a majority.) Kerala is India's thirteenth largest state by population and the eighth smallest by area. The governance of the state over the last few decades has alternated between the communist-led Left Democratic Front and the Congress-led United Democratic Front.

Constituency boundaries are periodically redrawn by the delimitation commission which tries to keep them as geographically compact areas, and with due consideration to existing boundaries of administrative units. The latest census is used to draw the boundaries and every assembly constituency has to be completely within a parliamentary constituency. Since the 1977 election, Kerala has had 140 single-seat constituencies, each of which directly elects a representative based on a first past the post election.

Since the independence of India from the United Kingdom in 1947, the Scheduled Castes (SC) and Scheduled Tribes (ST) have been given reservation status, guaranteeing political representation, and the Constitution lays down the general principles of positive discrimination for SCs and STs. According to the 2011 census of India, the Scheduled Castes constitute 9.1%, while the Scheduled Tribes constitute 1.5% of the population of the state. The Scheduled Castes have been granted a reservation of 14 seats in the assembly, while 2 constituencies are reserved for candidates of the Scheduled Tribes.

== History ==
Changes in the constituencies of the Kerala Legislative Assembly
| Year | Act/Order | Explanation | Total seats | Reserved seats | | Elections |
| Year | Act/Order | Explanation | Total seats | SC | ST | Elections |
|---|---|---|---|---|---|---|
| 1956 | States Reorganisation Act, 1956 | The new state of Kerala was formed by the merger of Travancore-Cochin with a few regions of Madras Presidency. The southern part of Travancore-Cochin (Kanyakumari district, along with Sengottai taluk) was transferred to Madras State. | 114 | 12 | 0 | 1957, 1960 |
| 1961 | Delimitation of Parliamentary and Assembly Constituencies Order, 1961 | There were changes in the number and reservation status of constituencies. Two-member constituencies were abolished. | 133 | 11 | 2 | 1965, 1967, 1970 |
| 1976 | Delimitation of Parliamentary and Assembly Constituencies Order, 1976 | There were changes in the number and reservation status of constituencies. | 140 | 13 | 1 | 1977, 1980, 1982, 1987, 1991, 1996, 2001, 2006 |
| 2007 | Delimitation Commission Order, 2007 | There were changes in the reservation status and area covered by constituencies. | 140 | 14 | 2 | 2011, 2016, 2021, 2026 |

== Constituencies ==
The constituencies of Kerala with their reservation status indicated by colour

Reservation
Scheduled Castes (SC)
Scheduled Tribes (ST)

Constituencies of the Kerala Legislative Assembly
| No. | Name | Reservation | District | Lok Sabha constituency | Electorate (2021) |
|---|---|---|---|---|---|
| 1 | Manjeshwaram | None | Kasargod | Kasaragod | 221,711 |
| 2 | Kasaragod | None | Kasargod | Kasaragod | 201,863 |
| 3 | Udma | None | Kasargod | Kasaragod | 214,368 |
| 4 | Kanhangad | None | Kasargod | Kasaragod | 218,836 |
| 5 | Thrikaripur | None | Kasargod | Kasaragod | 203,189 |
| 6 | Payyanur | None | Kannur | Kasaragod | 184,264 |
| 7 | Kalliasseri | None | Kannur | Kasaragod | 185,592 |
| 8 | Taliparamba | None | Kannur | Kannur | 214,068 |
| 9 | Irikkur | None | Kannur | Kannur | 195,695 |
| 10 | Azhikode | None | Kannur | Kannur | 181,838 |
| 11 | Kannur | None | Kannur | Kannur | 174,370 |
| 12 | Dharmadom | None | Kannur | Kannur | 193,486 |
| 13 | Thalassery | None | Kannur | Vadakara | 175,439 |
| 14 | Kuthuparamba | None | Kannur | Vadakara | 194,344 |
| 15 | Mattanur | None | Kannur | Kannur | 190,139 |
| 16 | Peravoor | None | Kannur | Kannur | 178,302 |
| 17 | Mananthavady | ST | Wayanad | Wayanad | 195,326 |
| 18 | Sulthan Bathery | ST | Wayanad | Wayanad | 220,642 |
| 19 | Kalpetta | None | Wayanad | Wayanad | 201,192 |
| 20 | Vatakara | None | Kozhikode | Vadakara | 167,694 |
| 21 | Kuttiady | None | Kozhikode | Vadakara | 202,518 |
| 22 | Nadapuram | None | Kozhikode | Vadakara | 216,491 |
| 23 | Koyilandy | None | Kozhikode | Vadakara | 206,652 |
| 24 | Perambra | None | Kozhikode | Vadakara | 198,218 |
| 25 | Balussery | SC | Kozhikode | Kozhikode | 225,249 |
| 26 | Elathur | None | Kozhikode | Kozhikode | 204,036 |
| 27 | Kozhikode North | None | Kozhikode | Kozhikode | 181,191 |
| 28 | Kozhikode South | None | Kozhikode | Kozhikode | 157,765 |
| 29 | Beypore | None | Kozhikode | Kozhikode | 208,219 |
| 30 | Kunnamangalam | None | Kozhikode | Kozhikode | 232,409 |
| 31 | Koduvally | None | Kozhikode | Kozhikode | 183,551 |
| 32 | Thiruvambady | None | Kozhikode | Wayanad | 180,570 |
| 33 | Kondotty | None | Malappuram | Malappuram | 205,411 |
| 34 | Eranad | None | Malappuram | Wayanad | 179,951 |
| 35 | Nilambur | None | Malappuram | Wayanad | 226,115 |
| 36 | Wandoor | SC | Malappuram | Wayanad | 226,658 |
| 37 | Manjeri | None | Malappuram | Malappuram | 207,051 |
| 38 | Perinthalmanna | None | Malappuram | Malappuram | 218,090 |
| 39 | Mankada | None | Malappuram | Malappuram | 217,930 |
| 40 | Malappuram | None | Malappuram | Malappuram | 212,076 |
| 41 | Vengara | None | Malappuram | Malappuram | 185,377 |
| 42 | Vallikkunnu | None | Malappuram | Malappuram | 198,962 |
| 43 | Tirurangadi | None | Malappuram | Ponnani | 197,158 |
| 44 | Tanur | None | Malappuram | Ponnani | 196,123 |
| 45 | Tirur | None | Malappuram | Ponnani | 229,493 |
| 46 | Kottakkal | None | Malappuram | Ponnani | 216,518 |
| 47 | Thavanur | None | Malappuram | Ponnani | 201,183 |
| 48 | Ponnani | None | Malappuram | Ponnani | 205,353 |
| 49 | Thrithala | None | Palakkad | Ponnani | 194,236 |
| 50 | Pattambi | None | Palakkad | Palakkad | 194,989 |
| 51 | Shornur | None | Palakkad | Palakkad | 194,287 |
| 52 | Ottapalam | None | Palakkad | Palakkad | 208,304 |
| 53 | Kongad | SC | Palakkad | Palakkad | 181,747 |
| 54 | Mannarkkad | None | Palakkad | Palakkad | 198,421 |
| 55 | Malampuzha | None | Palakkad | Palakkad | 213,746 |
| 56 | Palakkad | None | Palakkad | Palakkad | 188,789 |
| 57 | Tarur | SC | Palakkad | Alathur | 170,733 |
| 58 | Chittur | None | Palakkad | Alathur | 189,510 |
| 59 | Nenmara | None | Palakkad | Alathur | 193,075 |
| 60 | Alathur | None | Palakkad | Alathur | 171,419 |
| 61 | Chelakkara | SC | Thrissur | Alathur | 198,392 |
| 62 | Kunnamkulam | None | Thrissur | Alathur | 198,378 |
| 63 | Guruvayur | None | Thrissur | Thrissur | 211,447 |
| 64 | Manalur | None | Thrissur | Thrissur | 222,706 |
| 65 | Wadakkanchery | None | Thrissur | Alathur | 218,083 |
| 66 | Ollur | None | Thrissur | Thrissur | 208,075 |
| 67 | Thrissur | None | Thrissur | Thrissur | 182,823 |
| 68 | Nattika | SC | Thrissur | Thrissur | 210,708 |
| 69 | Kaipamangalam | None | Thrissur | Chalakudy | 174,025 |
| 70 | Irinjalakuda | None | Thrissur | Thrissur | 201,978 |
| 71 | Puthukkad | None | Thrissur | Thrissur | 201,192 |
| 72 | Chalakudy | None | Thrissur | Chalakudy | 192,929 |
| 73 | Kodungallur | None | Thrissur | Chalakudy | 193,042 |
| 74 | Perumbavoor | None | Ernakulam | Chalakudy | 184,654 |
| 75 | Angamaly | None | Ernakulam | Chalakudy | 178,015 |
| 76 | Aluva | None | Ernakulam | Chalakudy | 196,577 |
| 77 | Kalamassery | None | Ernakulam | Ernakulam | 201,781 |
| 78 | Paravur | None | Ernakulam | Ernakulam | 201,478 |
| 79 | Vypin | None | Ernakulam | Ernakulam | 172,205 |
| 80 | Kochi | None | Ernakulam | Ernakulam | 181,923 |
| 81 | Thrippunithura | None | Ernakulam | Ernakulam | 211,714 |
| 82 | Ernakulam | None | Ernakulam | Ernakulam | 164,641 |
| 83 | Thrikkakara | None | Ernakulam | Ernakulam | 194,113 |
| 84 | Kunnathunad | SC | Ernakulam | Chalakudy | 187,820 |
| 85 | Piravom | None | Ernakulam | Kottayam | 212,068 |
| 86 | Muvattupuzha | None | Ernakulam | Idukki | 191,222 |
| 87 | Kothamangalam | None | Ernakulam | Idukki | 172,763 |
| 88 | Devikulam | SC | Idukki | Idukki | 169,400 |
| 89 | Udumbanchola | None | Idukki | Idukki | 167,644 |
| 90 | Thodupuzha | None | Idukki | Idukki | 191,364 |
| 91 | Idukki | None | Idukki | Idukki | 186,503 |
| 92 | Peerumade | None | Idukki | Idukki | 174,514 |
| 93 | Pala | None | Kottayam | Kottayam | 185,008 |
| 94 | Kaduthuruthy | None | Kottayam | Kottayam | 187,910 |
| 95 | Vaikom | SC | Kottayam | Kottayam | 164,791 |
| 96 | Ettumanoor | None | Kottayam | Kottayam | 168,266 |
| 97 | Kottayam | None | Kottayam | Kottayam | 165,404 |
| 98 | Puthuppally | None | Kottayam | Kottayam | 176,103 |
| 99 | Changanassery | None | Kottayam | Mavelikkara | 171,743 |
| 100 | Kanjirappally | None | Kottayam | Pathanamthitta | 186,904 |
| 101 | Poonjar | None | Kottayam | Pathanamthitta | 189,258 |
| 102 | Aroor | None | Alappuzha | Alappuzha | 200,211 |
| 103 | Cherthala | None | Alappuzha | Alappuzha | 213,687 |
| 104 | Alappuzha | None | Alappuzha | Alappuzha | 202,381 |
| 105 | Ambalappuzha | None | Alappuzha | Alappuzha | 179,148 |
| 106 | Kuttanad | None | Alappuzha | Mavelikkara | 168,723 |
| 107 | Haripad | None | Alappuzha | Alappuzha | 197,598 |
| 108 | Kayamkulam | None | Alappuzha | Alappuzha | 214,839 |
| 109 | Mavelikara | SC | Alappuzha | Mavelikkara | 206,012 |
| 110 | Chengannur | None | Alappuzha | Mavelikkara | 208,498 |
| 111 | Thiruvalla | None | Pathanamthitta | Pathanamthitta | 212,288 |
| 112 | Ranni | None | Pathanamthitta | Pathanamthitta | 194,086 |
| 113 | Aranmula | None | Pathanamthitta | Pathanamthitta | 238,077 |
| 114 | Konni | None | Pathanamthitta | Pathanamthitta | 203,737 |
| 115 | Adoor | SC | Pathanamthitta | Pathanamthitta | 209,397 |
| 116 | Karunagapally | None | Kollam | Alappuzha | 215,293 |
| 117 | Chavara | None | Kollam | Kollam | 182,312 |
| 118 | Kunnathur | SC | Kollam | Mavelikkara | 207,835 |
| 119 | Kottarakkara | None | Kollam | Mavelikkara | 201,909 |
| 120 | Pathanapuram | None | Kollam | Mavelikkara | 185,116 |
| 121 | Punalur | None | Kollam | Kollam | 206,496 |
| 122 | Chadayamangalam | None | Kollam | Kollam | 201,643 |
| 123 | Kundara | None | Kollam | Kollam | 206,767 |
| 124 | Kollam | None | Kollam | Kollam | 176,553 |
| 125 | Eravipuram | None | Kollam | Kollam | 176,076 |
| 126 | Chathannoor | None | Kollam | Kollam | 185,271 |
| 127 | Varkala | None | Thiruvananthapuram | Attingal | 187,948 |
| 128 | Attingal | SC | Thiruvananthapuram | Attingal | 202,550 |
| 129 | Chirayinkeezhu | SC | Thiruvananthapuram | Attingal | 199,492 |
| 130 | Nedumangad | None | Thiruvananthapuram | Attingal | 208,123 |
| 131 | Vamanapuram | None | Thiruvananthapuram | Attingal | 200,798 |
| 132 | Kazhakkoottam | None | Thiruvananthapuram | Thiruvananthapuram | 194,752 |
| 133 | Vattiyoorkavu | None | Thiruvananthapuram | Thiruvananthapuram | 208,543 |
| 134 | Thiruvananthapuram | None | Thiruvananthapuram | Thiruvananthapuram | 203,584 |
| 135 | Nemom | None | Thiruvananthapuram | Thiruvananthapuram | 204,718 |
| 136 | Aruvikkara | None | Thiruvananthapuram | Attingal | 193,873 |
| 137 | Parassala | None | Thiruvananthapuram | Thiruvananthapuram | 220,246 |
| 138 | Kattakkada | None | Thiruvananthapuram | Attingal | 196,792 |
| 139 | Kovalam | None | Thiruvananthapuram | Thiruvananthapuram | 219,341 |
| 140 | Neyyattinkara | None | Thiruvananthapuram | Thiruvananthapuram | 187,559 |

== See also ==
- List of former constituencies of the Kerala Legislative Assembly
