= Parli =

Parli may refer to:

== Indian place names ==
- Parli, Maharashtra, a city and a municipal council in Beed district
- Parli, Rajasthan, a village in the Malpura Tahsil
- Parli (Vidhan Sabha constituency), a legislative assembly in Maharashtra
- Parli-I, a village in Palakkad district in the state of Kerala
- Parli-II, a village in Palakkad district in the state of Kerala
- Parli (gram panchayat), a local government organisation for the Parli-I and Parli-II villages above

== Slang and abbreviations ==
- Parliament
- Parliamentary debate (an academic debate event)
- Parliament (cigarette)
- Parli Pro, a shortened name for the National FFA Organization Parliamentary Procedure Career Development Event

== See also ==
- Parley
