= Pathrose =

Pathrose is a surname. Notable people with the surname include:

- A.T. Pathrose (1932–2020), Indian politician
- Manju Pathrose, Indian actress
