= Anthikad =

Anthikad അന്തിക്കാട്
- Village
- Location in Kerala, India Anthikad (India)
- Coordinates: 10.458°N 76.126°E
- Country: India
- State: Kerala
- District: Thrissur

Government
  - Body: Anthikad Grama Panchayath, Thanniyam Grama Panchayath, Manalur Grama Panchayath

Population (2011)
  - Total: 9,826

Languages
  - Official: Malayalam,
- Time zone: UTC+5:30 (IST)
- PIN: 680641
- Telephone Code: 0487
- Vehicle registration: KL-75
- Nearest City: Thrissur
- Lok Sabha constituency: Thrissur
- Legislative Assembly constituency: Nattika

Anthikad (അന്തിക്കാട് in Malayalam) is a village in Thrissur district in the state of Kerala, India. It is in Thrissur Thaluk, Nattika constituency and Anthikad Block. Manalur and Thanyam are the nearest panchayats. Anthikad is famous for toddy production and paddy fields. Anthikad won `Nelkathir' award for best paddy cultivation in Kerala in 2008. Anthikad is the headquarter for a major financial enterprise, the Peringottukara Namboothiri Yogashkema Sabha Credit & Investment Company Ltd. (PNY Sabha), which was formed in the year 1907.

== History ==
This village held an important position in shaping the political and the social perspectives of Kerala. The toddy tappers were organised by communists who were hiding from the police to avoid arrest. Com. George Chadayanmuri, who working underground (evading arrest as per instruction of communist party) took pains to talk to the toddy tappers and bring them under the umbrella of a union.

== Communist influence ==
Communists converted the toddy tappers from slaves of brutal contractors to modern-day human beings and these workers became the leaders of society. Farmers, teachers and other people accepted the leadership of toddy tappers and together they took part in the freedom struggle and also fought for the upliftment of lives. Comrade(Late) Chathu Master, K.R. Kelu, K.G. Kelan, K.S. Chathu Kutty, N.C. Shankaran, K.S. Kittunni, M.R. Shankaran Kodappully, and many others were several times arrested, jailed and tortured for their crimes of organising workers against contractors. Former Revenue Minister, Mr. K.P. Rajendran was a son of a leader of toddy tappers, K.P Prabhakaran, who himself was once made a minister. Mr. K.P. Prabhakaran is the product of the agitations toddy workers led relentlessly during the pre-and-post independence period.

== Tapper agitation ==
At the height of the Toddy Tappers agitation, there were also several tappers who did not want to take risks and join the struggle. Instead, these people united under the banner of Congress Party and their trade union, becoming rival union activists who even acted as agents of the contractors and the Police.

When the agitating communists decided to go on an indefinite strike, contractors suffered resulting financial losses. At that time, rival union members decided to manufacture more toddy to make up for losses suffered due to protests.

To prevent this, the striking workers decided to cut down the flower-buds of coconut trees from which the agents of the contractors were able to produce toddy. They came in at night, and cut off flower-buds of trees in a highly organised action later called 'Kola Muri Samaram' (Coconut Flower Chopping Resistance).

== Police action ==
These movements were met with very cruel suppression using Police and Government forces supported by the judiciary. House searches, illegal custodies, lock-up tortures of all kinds and forms, atrocities on women, all took place. However, everything the government and the contractors tried to defeat the strikers failed. Finally, they had no choice but to call the Communist leaders for negotiation.

== Socio-economic conditions ==
The people in Anthikad area are mainly engaged in foreign employment in the Middle East, farming, trading and the service sector. The number of toddy tappers, a traditional employment, reduced drastically due to the collapse of the traditional industry.

Farming, especially greenhouse cultivation has become a passion for many especially those returning from employment abroad.

Land value is very high and real estate business is lucrative business in the whole area of the Thrissur constituency, including Anthikad.

Even though large areas are still used for rice and coconut cultivation (the area is declared as Ramsar site), rice or coconut-based agro-industry is far away in neighboring Ernakulam, Malappuram and Palakkad districts.

The Dairy industry and rural banking have been developed as cooperative sectors here since the 1960s.

In short, the major source of income and cash flow is from foreign remittance, farming, dairy and service sector.

People belong to Hindu, Muslim and Christian religions and co-exist peacefully. Brahmin, Nair and Ezhava caste communities are very strong here in Anthikad and adjoining Manappuram, but they do not show any interest in organizing under caste identities. Overall society is very secular and the pagan God "Chathan" itself is a symbol of the unity among different castes or religions.

Due to the influence of materialist and rational thinking, socially people report 100% literacy.

== Hospital ==
General Hospital, Anthikad, recently upgraded to Community Health Center, is situated within the Anthikad Grama Panchayat, in the west part of Thrissur District and 15 km (9.3 mi) to Thrissur town. This hospital is a refuge for the ordinary people of Anthikad, Kanjani, Peringottukara, Manalur areas.

== Famous personalities ==
- K Rajan Revenue Minister & Ollur MLA
- V.S. Sunil Kumar Ex. Agriculture Minister
- Sathyan Anthikad Malayalam Film Director and script Writer.
- P Balachandran Thrissur MLA
- K. P. Prabhakaran Ex. Health Minister
- K. P. Rajendran Ex. Revenue Minister
- V. M. Sudheeran Ex. KPCC President
- K. P. Unnikrishnan AI Scientist.

== Demographics ==
As of 2011 India census, Anthikad had a population of 9826 with 4637 males and 5189 females.

== Religion ==
There is a Hindu temple dedicated to goddess Durga viz., Sri Karthyayani Temple in Anthikad.
