= A. Raja (Kerala politician) =

Indian politician

Member of the Kerala Legislative Assembly for Devikulam
- In office May 2021 – May 2026
- Preceded by: S. Rajendran
- Succeeded by: F. Raja

Personal details
- Born: 17 October 1986 (age 40) Kerala
- Party: Communist Party of India (Marxist)
- Spouse: Shyni Priya
- Children: Akshara, Aradhya
- Education: Government Law College, Coimbatore

Anthony Raja is an Indian politician who served as the MLA of Devikulam Constituency from May 2021 to May 2026. He was disqualified for being elected from an SC constituency as he was a Christian and not a member of any SC community. The decision was subsequently stayed by the Supreme Court and the final decision on the matter is pending as of 3 January 2025.

== Personal life ==
A. Raja was born on 17 October 1986, to Anthony Lakshmanan and Easwary, who were plantation workers. He is an advocate by profession, practising in Munsiff Court, Devikulam since 2009. He finished his LLB from Govt. Law College, Coimbatore.

== Political career ==
Raja defeated D. Kumar of UDF by 7848 votes in the Kerala Legislative Assembly Election, 2021. He erred in taking oath as Member of Legislative Assembly and was fined Rs 2,500.

In March 2023, Kerala High Court declared that his election to Devikulam Assembly constituency is void on grounds of the production of fake caste certificate.
