= Devikulam Assembly constituency =

Constituency of the Kerala legislative assembly in India

Devikulam
- Constituency No. 88 for the Kerala Legislative Assembly
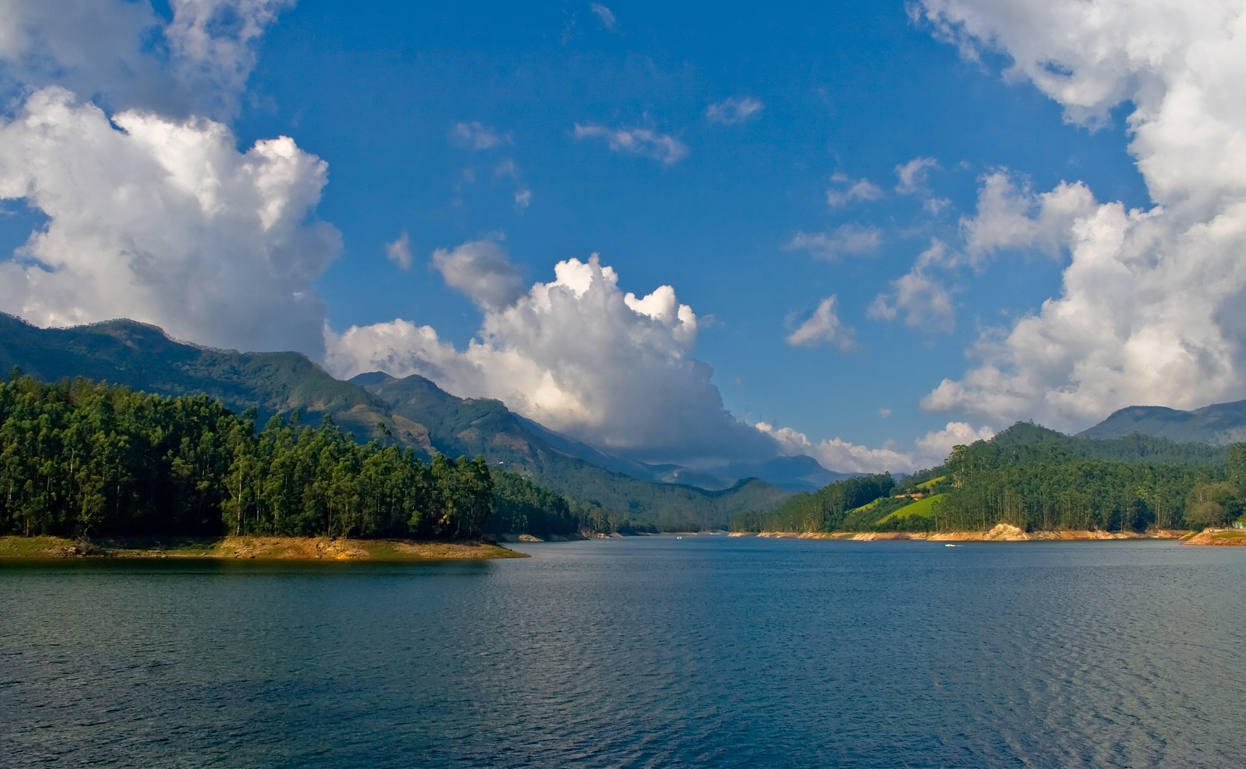
- Mattupetty Dam near Munnar

Constituency details
- Country: India
- Region: South India
- State: Kerala
- District: Idukki
- Established: 1957
- Total electors: 1,64,803 (2016)
- Reservation: SC

Member of Legislative Assembly
- 16th Kerala Legislative Assembly
- Incumbent F. Raja
- Party: INC
- Elected year: 2026

Devikulam State assembly constituency is one of the 140 state legislative assembly constituencies in Kerala in southern India. It is also one of the seven state legislative assembly constituencies included in Idukki Lok Sabha constituency. Since 2011, the constituency has been reserved for members of the Scheduled Castes (SC). Since the 2026 assembly elections, F Raja of INC is the MLA.

== Local self-governed segments ==
Devikulam Assembly constituency is composed of the following local self-governed segments:

Name	Status (Grama panchayat/Municipality)	Taluk
Devikulam	Grama panchayat	Devikulam
Adimali	Grama panchayat	Devikulam
Edamalakkudy	Grama panchayat	Devikulam
Kanthalloor	Grama panchayat	Devikulam
Mankulam	Grama panchayat	Devikulam
Marayur	Grama panchayat	Devikulam
Munnar	Grama panchayat	Devikulam
Pallivasal	Grama panchayat	Devikulam
Vattavada	Grama panchayat	Devikulam
Vellathuval	Grama panchayat	Devikulam
Bisonvalley	Grama panchayat	Udumbanchola
Chinnakanal	Grama panchayat	Udumbanchola

== Members of the Legislative Assembly ==
The following list contains all members of Kerala Legislative Assembly who have represented the constituency:

Key

CPI INC CPI(M)

Election	Niyama Sabha	Member	Party	Tenure
1957	1st	Rosammma Punnose	Communist Party of India	1957 – 1958
1957	1st	N. Ganapathy	Indian National Congress	1957 – 1960
1958*	1st	Rosammma Punnose	Communist Party of India	1958 – 1960
1960	2nd	M. M. Sundaram	Communist Party of India	1960 – 1965
1960	2nd	Murugesan Thiruvengadan	Indian National Congress	1960 – 1965
1967	3rd	N. Ganapathy	Indian National Congress	1967 – 1970
1970	4th	G. Varadan	Communist Party of India	1970 – 1977
1977	5th	Kittappanarayanaswamy	Indian National Congress	1977 – 1980
1980	6th	G. Varadan	Communist Party of India	1980 – 1982
1982	7th	G. Varadan	Communist Party of India	1982 – 1987
1987	8th	Sundaram Manickam	Communist Party of India	1987 – 1991
1991	9th	A. K. Moni	Indian National Congress	1991 – 1996
1996	10th	A. K. Moni	Indian National Congress	1996 – 2001
2001	11th	A. K. Moni	Indian National Congress	2001 – 2006
2006	12th	S. Rajendran	Communist Party of India	2006 – 2011
2011	13th	S. Rajendran	Communist Party of India	2011 – 2016
2016	14th	S. Rajendran	Communist Party of India	2016 – 2021
2021	15th	A. Raja	Communist Party of India	2021-2023
2026	9th	F. Raja	Indian National Congress	Incumbent

* by-election

== Election results ==
Percentage change (±%) denotes the change in the number of votes from the immediate previous election.

=== 2026 ===
2026 Kerala Legislative Assembly election: Devikulam
Party	Candidate	Votes	%	±%
INC	F. Raja	50,590	45.12	▲0.90
CPI(M)	A.Raja	45,357	40.45	▼10.55
BJP	S.Rajendran	15,032	13.41	▲9.34
BSP	Rajendran V B	206	0.18	−
Independent	Chelladurai M	89	0.08	−
Independent	Selvi	194	0.17	−
NOTA	None of the above	667	0.57	−
Margin of victory		5,133		
Turnout		112135		
INC gain from CPI(M)		Swing		

=== 2021 ===
2021 Kerala Legislative Assembly election: Devikulam
Party	Candidate	Votes	%	±%
CPI(M)	Adv A.Raja	59,049	51.00	
INC	D. Kumar	51,201	44.22	
NDA	Ganesan. S	4,717	4.07	
NOTA	None of the above	921	0.78	
Margin of victory		7,848		
Turnout		1,15,774	68.34	
CPI(M) hold		Swing		

=== 2016 ===
There were 1,64,803 registered voters in the constituency for the 2016 Kerala Assembly election.

2016 Kerala Legislative Assembly election: Devikulam
Party	Candidate	Votes	%	±%
CPI(M)	S. Rajendran	49,510	42.18	▼6.25
INC	A. K. Mony	43,728	37.25	▼7.37
AIADMK	R. M. Dhanalakshmy	11,613	9.89	▲9.29
BJP	N. Chandran	9,592	8.17	▲4.82
NOTA	None of the above	921	0.78	−
Independent	J. Rajeshwary	650	0.55	−
PDP	Rajendran R.	485	0.41	−
Independent	C. K. Govindhan	303	0.26	−
Independent	K. Manikandan	267	0.23	▼0.03
Independent	Pandiraj	184	0.16	−
Independent	K. P. Ayyapan	129	0.11	−
Margin of victory		6,232	4.93	▲1.12
Turnout		1,17,382	71.23	▼1.18
CPI(M) hold		Swing	▼6.25	

=== 2011 ===
There were 1,47,855 registered voters in the constituency for the 2011 election.

2011 Kerala Legislative Assembly election: Devikulam
Party	Candidate	Votes	%	±%
CPI(M)	S. Rajendran	51,849	48.43	−
INC	A. K. Mony	47,771	44.62	
BJP	S. Rajagopal	3,582	3.35	−
Independent	Selvaraj Madaswami	1,060	0.99	−
BSP	T. C. Thankappan	913	0.85	
AIADMK	Mallika	646	0.60	−
SDPI	Raju Ayyapan	628	0.59	−
Independent	P. K. Mani	336	0.31	−
Independent	K. Manikandan	274	0.26	−
Margin of victory		4,078	3.81	
Turnout		1,07,059	72.41	
CPI(M) hold		Swing		

== See also ==
- Devikulam
- Idukki district
- List of constituencies of the Kerala Legislative Assembly
- 2016 Kerala Legislative Assembly election
