= K. T. Achuthan =

Indian politician

K.T. Achuthan
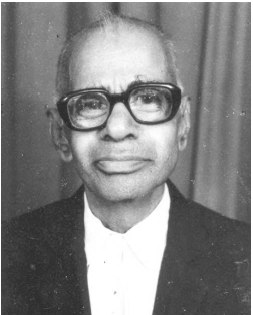

Minister for Transport & Labour, Pattom Ministry
- In office 22 February 1960 – 26 September 1962
- Preceded by: T. V. Thomas
- Succeeded by: Himself

Minister for Transport & Labour, Sankar Ministry
- In office 26 September 1962 – 10 September 1964
- Preceded by: Himself
- Succeeded by: E. K. Imbichi Bava (Minister for Transport) Mathai Manjooran (Minister for labour)

Member of Parliament for Cangannur
- In office 1952–1956
- Preceded by: Office Established
- Succeeded by: Narayankutty Menon

M. L. A. of Kerala Assembly for Nattika
- In office 1960–1964

Personal details
- Born: April 1911 Pudukkad
- Died: 8 January 1999 (aged 87)
- Party: Indian National Congress
- Spouse: A. K. Savithri
- Children: 3 sons and 3 daughters
- Parent(s): Theyyan Vaidyar and Madhavi
- Occupation: Politician; Lawyer

K. Theyyan Achuthan (April 1911 – 8 January 1999) was an Indian politician from Kerala and a leader in the Indian National Congress. He served as Minister for Transport & Labour in both R. Sankar ministry and Pattom Thanu Pillai ministry.

== Biography ==
Shri. K.T. Achuthan, advocate and senior Congress leader, was born as the son of Shri. Theyyan Vaidyar and Smt. Madhavi in April 1911. Shri Achuthan had served as a Member of Kochi Legislative Assembly from 1943 to 1949, and Travancore-Cochin Legislative Assembly from 1949 to 1951.

== Political career ==
Shri Achuthan became elected to the second Kerala Legislative Assembly in 1960, contesting from Nattika constituency as a Congress candidate. Shri. Achuthan held the portfolio of Transport and Labour in the Pattom Thanu Pillai Ministry from 22-2-1960 to 26–9–1962. He was the Minister for Transport and Labour in the R. Sankar cabinet too, from 26-9-1962 to 10–9–1964. He had also served for a term as a Member of the Lok Sabha, from 1952 to 1957.

In the course of a long political career, Shri. Achuthan has held several important positions in different walks of life. He was Member, Municipal Council, Irinjalakuda and General Secretary, Cochin SNDP Yogam.

== Marriage and children ==
Smt. Savithri was his wife and they have four sons and three daughters.

== Death ==
Achuthan died on 8 January 1999 at the age of 87. The Assembly paid tribute to him on 26 February 1999.
