= M. M. Sundaram =

Indian politician

Sundaram Murukandy

Member of the Kerala Legislative Assembly
- In office 1960–1965
- Preceded by: Rosamma Punnoose
- Succeeded by: N. Ganapathy
- Constituency: Devikulam

Personal details
- Born: February , 1931
- Died: November 26, 1971 (aged 40)

Sundaram Murukandy (February 1931 - 26 November 1971) was an Indian politician and leader of Communist Party of India (CPI). He represented Devikolam constituency in 2nd Kerala Legislative Assembly elected in the 1960 Kerala Legislative Assembly election.

Sundaram, who entered politics through the Indian National Trade Union Congress, worked among plantation workers, and later joined All India Trade Union Congress (AITUC). Sundaram joined the CPI in 1956. He was also a member of the Central Council of the AITUC and an executive member of the Kottayam district council of the CPI.

He died on November 26, 1971.
