= Pattom A. Thanu Pillai ministry =

Cabinet of Kerala, India, from 1960 to 1962

Pattam Thanu Pillai Ministry
- 2nd Cabinet of Kerala
- 22 February 1960 – 26 September 1962
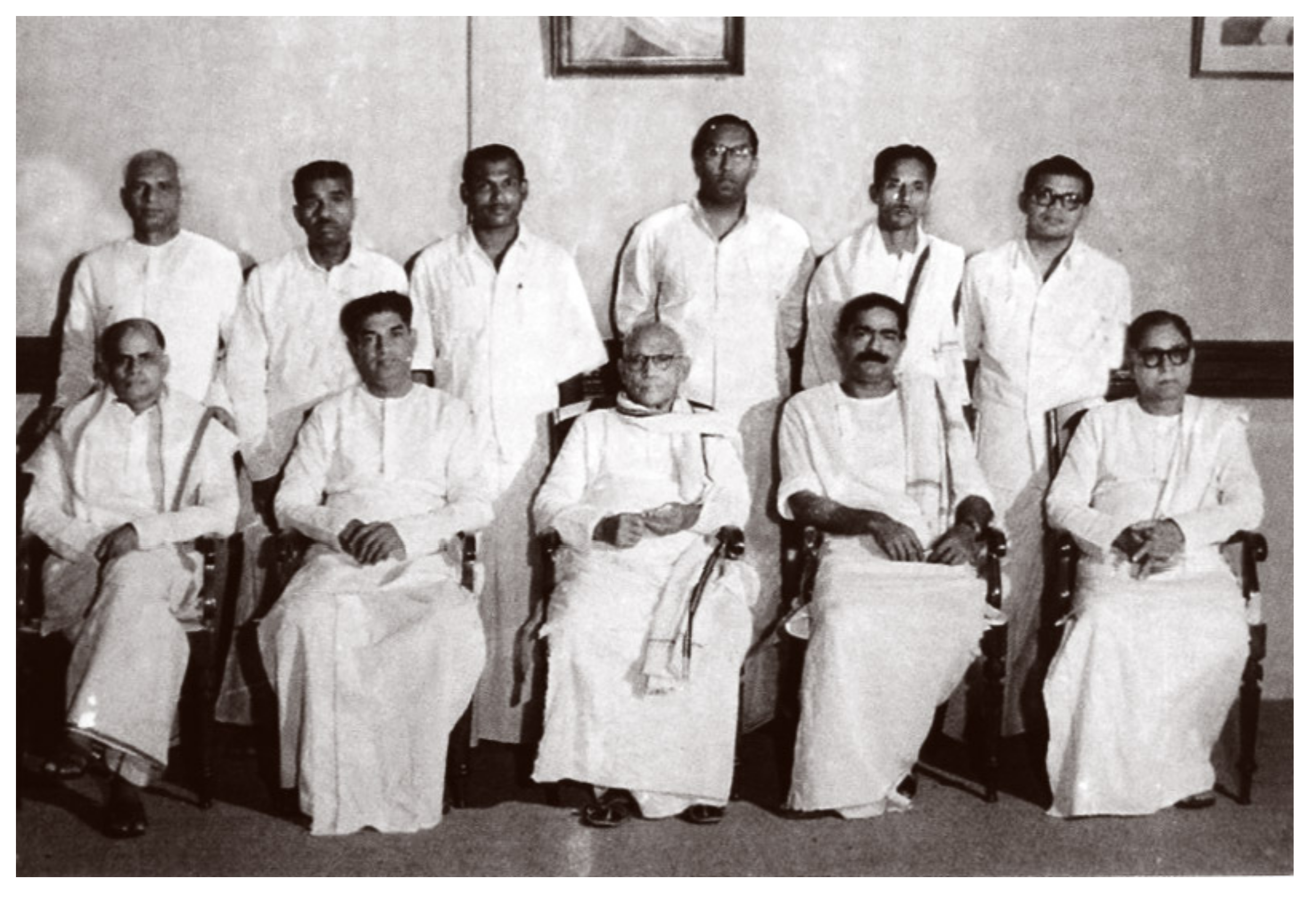
- Date formed: 22 February 1960
- Date dissolved: 26 September 1962

People and organisations
- Head of government: Pattom A. Thanu Pillai
- Deputy head of government: R. Sankar
- Member party: Praja Socialist Party; Indian National Congress; Indian Union Muslim League
- Status in legislature: Coalition Majority
- Opposition party: Communist Party of India
- Opposition leader: E. M. S. Namboodiripad

History
- Election: 1960
- Predecessor: First Namboodiripad ministry
- Successor: Sankar ministry

The Pattom A. Thanu Pillai ministry was a Kerala government ministry formed on 22 February 1960 and lasted till 26 September 1962.

== Background ==
After E M S Namboothiripad Government was dismissed, Kerala was under President rule. Elections were held to the legislative assembly on 1 February 1960.

Indian National Congress became the largest party with 63 seats in the assembly after the elections. Communists became the second largest party 26 seats and Praja Socialist Party (PSP) got 20 seats. Congress and PSP formed a coalition government, with Pattom A Thanu Pillai of PSP as the Chief Minister, and R Sankar from Congress as the Deputy Chief Minister. Even though PSP was a junior partner in the coalition, Pattam was chosen as the Chief Minister because the congress leader R Sankar was from Ezhava caste which the Nair Service Society, the main supporters of Congress, disapproved of. Pattam previously held the posts of Prime Minister in the erstwhile Travancore state, and later the Chief Minister of Travancore-Cochin state. He is the only Chief Minister of Kerala born in 19th century.

V. K. Velappan, the Health Minister of this cabinet, died on 26 August 1962, and was the first state cabinet minister in Kerala to die in office. Pattam resigned on 26 September 1962 when he was posted as the Governor of Punjab. This paved the way for the first Congress chief minister in Kerala under R. Sankar.

== Council of Ministers ==
	Minister	Ministry/Portfolio	Party
1	Pattam A. Thanu Pillai	Chief Minister	Praja Socialist Party
2	R. Sankar	Deputy Chief Minister Minister for Finance	Indian National Congress
3	P. T. Chacko	Minister for Home Affairs	Indian National Congress
4	K. A. Damodara Menon	Minister for Industries	Indian National Congress
5	P. P. Ummer Koya	Department of Education	Indian National Congress
6	K. T. Achuthan	Minister for Transport & Labour	Indian National Congress
7	E. P. Poulose	Minister for Food & Agriculture	Indian National Congress
8	V. K. Velappan	Minister for Public Health & Electricity (expired on 26 August 1962)	Indian National Congress
9	K. Kunhambu	Minister for Harijan Uplift & Registration	Indian National Congress
10	D. Damodaran Potti	Minister for Public Works	Praja Socialist Party
11	K. Chandrasekharan	Minister for Law & Revenue	Praja Socialist Party

== See also ==
- List of chief ministers of Kerala
- Kerala Council of Ministers
- 1960 Kerala Legislative Assembly election
