= C. K. Narayanan Kutty =

Indian politician

Member of the Kerala Legislative Assembly
- In office 1957–1960
- Constituency: Parali constituency

Personal details
- Born: 15 February 1927
- Died: 28 April 2009

C. K. Narayanan Kutty (15 February 1927 – 28 April 2009) was an Indian politician. He represented Parali constituency in the first Kerala Legislative Assembly.

== Life ==
Narayanan Kutty had graduated from the Thrissur Kerala Varma College. He is also a graduate in law from the Madras Law College and practised in the Palakkad Bar. Narayanan Kutty was an active member in the AISF All India Students' Federation. Later he became a member of the Communist party. In 1957, he contested from the Parli bilingual assembly and won against K Gopalakrishnan Nair of the Congress by a margin of 7,631 votes. Narayanankutty was a close associate of Communist leaders such as E M S Namboodiripad, C Achutha Menon and M N Govindan Nair.
