= Ramamangalam =

Ramamangalam Shatkala Govinda Gramam
- Village
- Nickname: moonnuvashapuzha naad
- Location in Kerala, India Ramamangalam (India)
- Coordinates: 9°56′0″N 76°30′0″E
- Country: India
- State: Kerala
- District: Ernakulam
- Named for: Lord Rama

Population (2011)
  - Total: 10,035

Languages
  - Official: Malayalam, English
- Time zone: UTC+5:30 (IST)
- PIN: 686663
- Assembly constituency: Piravom
- Assembly MLA: Anoop Jacob

Ramamangalam is a village in Ernakulam district in the Indian state of Kerala, it lies between Kolenchery, Piravom and Muvattupuzha towns. This small town lies in the Muvattupuzha taluk.

== Etymology ==
The origin of the name "Ramamangalam" is believed to come from Lord Rama, a widely revered Hindu Deity. According to the belief, shortly after their marriage, Lord Rama and Sita Devi visited the village during their vanavasa from Ayodhya on the demand of his Stepmother, Kaikeyi. The village was subsequently named as Sriramamangalam, later shortened to Ramamangalam.

== History ==
Ramamangalam was under the rule of Cheraman Perumal long ago. The village is dotted with temples, the most notable of which is Ramamangalam Perumthrikkovil built by Cheraman Perumal between the 8th and 12th centuries AD.

== Demographics ==
As of 2011 India census, Ramamangalam had a population of 10035 with 5036 males and 4999 females.

== Notable people ==
- E. P. Poulose - Indian politician
- Shadkala Govinda Marar - Carnatic musician
- Kumari Shibulal - Indian philanthropist
