= Sankar ministry =

1962–64 government of Kerala, India

R Sankar Ministry
- 3rd Cabinet of Kerala
- 26 September 1962 – 10 September 1964
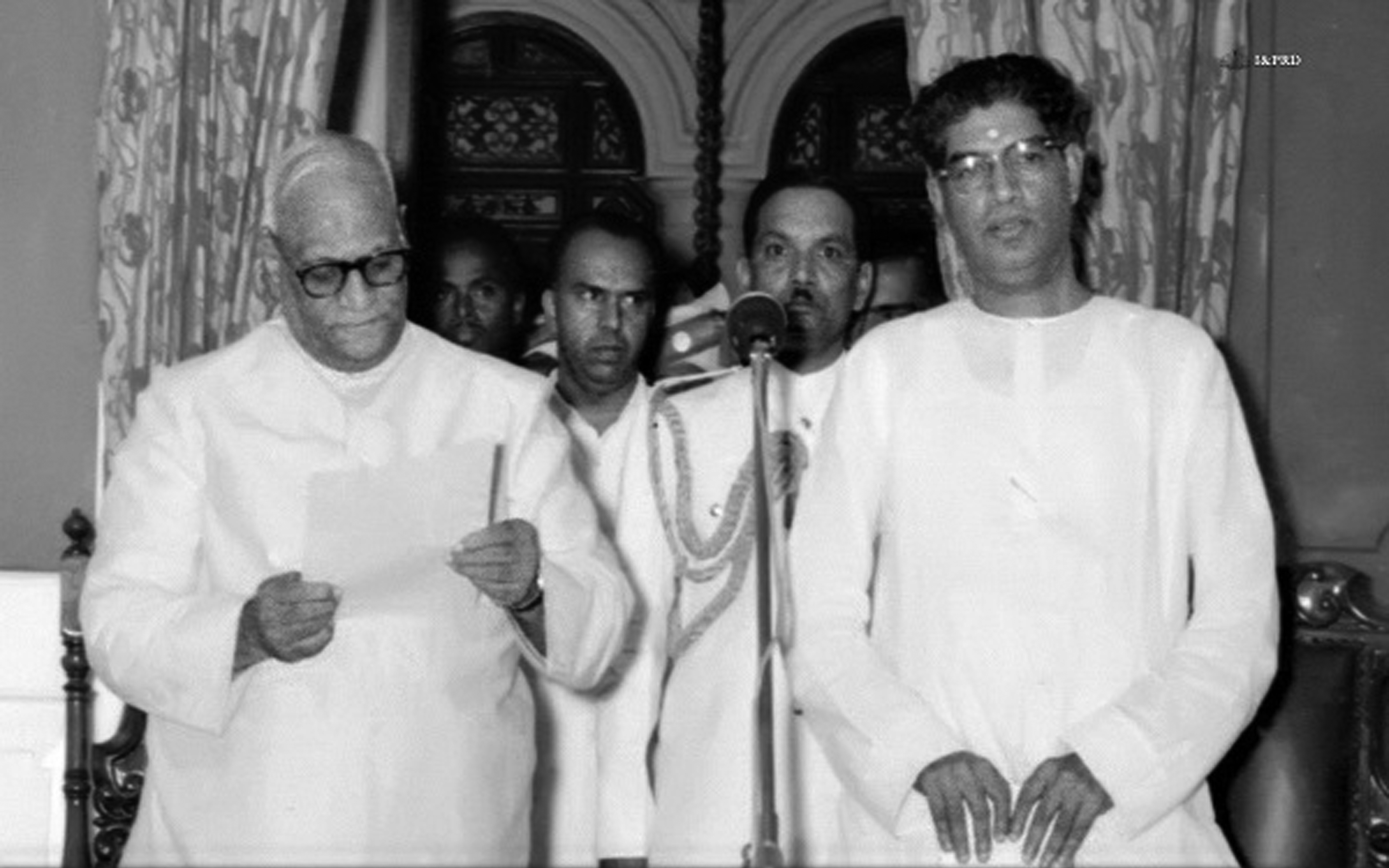
- Sankar administered oath by Governor V. V. Giri
- Date formed: 26 September 1962
- Date dissolved: 10 September 1964

People and organisations
- Head of government: R. Sankar
- Member party: Indian National Congress
- Status in legislature: Minority
- Opposition party: Communist Party of India
- Opposition leader: E. M. S. Namboodiripad

History
- Election: 1960
- Predecessor: Pattom Ministry
- Successor: Second Namboodiripad ministry

The Council of Ministers (1962–64) of Legislative Assembly, Kerala state (better known as the R. Sankar ministry was the Council of Ministers, the executive wing of state government, in the Indian state of Kerala. The ministry was led by Indian National Congress leader R. Sankar from 26 September 1962 to 10 September 1964 and had 11 ministers.

Deputy Chief R. Sankar was elevated to the post of Chief Minister when the incumbent Chief Minister Pattom A. Thanu Pillai was appointed as Governor of Punjab.

Sankar held office for nearly 2 years before losing a no-confidence motion when dissenters within the Congress party split to form the Kerala Congress, following the resignation and subsequent death of P. T. Chacko. the Chacko loyalists in the Congress party grouped together and formed the Kerala Congress under the leadership of K. M. George with the blessings of Mannath Padmanabhan, NSS supremo.

== Council of Ministers ==
	Minister	Ministry/Portfolio	Party
1	R. Sankar	Chief Minister	Indian National Congress
2	P. T. Chacko	Minister for Home Affairs (resigned with effect from 20 February 1964)	Indian National Congress
3	K. A. Damodara Menon	Minister for Industries	Indian National Congress
4	P. P. Ummer Koya	Minister for Local Administration, Fisheries & Public Works	Indian National Congress
5	K. T. Achuthan	Minister for Transport & Labour	Indian National Congress
6	E. P. Poulose	Minister for Food & Agriculture	Indian National Congress
7	K. Kunhambu	Minister for Harijan Welfare & Registration	Indian National Congress
8	D. Damodaran Potti	Minister for Public Works (resigned w.e.f. 8 October 1962)	Praja Socialist Party
9	K. Chandrasekharan	Minister for Law and Revenue (resigned w.e.f. 8 October 1962)	Praja Socialist Party
10	M. P. Govindan Nair	Minister for Public Health (assumed office on 9 October 1962)	Indian National Congress
11	T. A. Thomman	Minister for Land Revenue, Law & Legislation (assumed office on 2 March 1964)	Indian National Congress

== Vote of No-Confidence ==
The controversial resignation of the then Home Minister P. T Chacko led to an outburst within the Congress party. With Chacko's failure to win the party presidentship and his subsequent death, 15 Congress MLAs split from the parent party under the leadership of K. M. George. The government which was running on a narrow majority subsequently went on to lose the no confidence motion 73-50.

Soon afterwards, dissenters from the Congress party subsequently formed a new party Kerala Congress. This had a major role on the fortunes of the Congress party in the 1965 assembly elections with the Congress securing 36 seats and the Kerala Congress 25 seats. The two parties together garnered nearly 45% of the vote share, evidently showing that a united Congress would have returned to power.

== See also ==
- List of chief ministers of Kerala
- Kerala Council of Ministers
- 1960 Kerala Legislative Assembly election
