= 1965 Kerala Legislative Assembly election =

- 4 March 1965

All 133 seats in the Kerala Legislative Assembly 67 seats needed for a majority
- Turnout: 75.12% (▼10.6%)
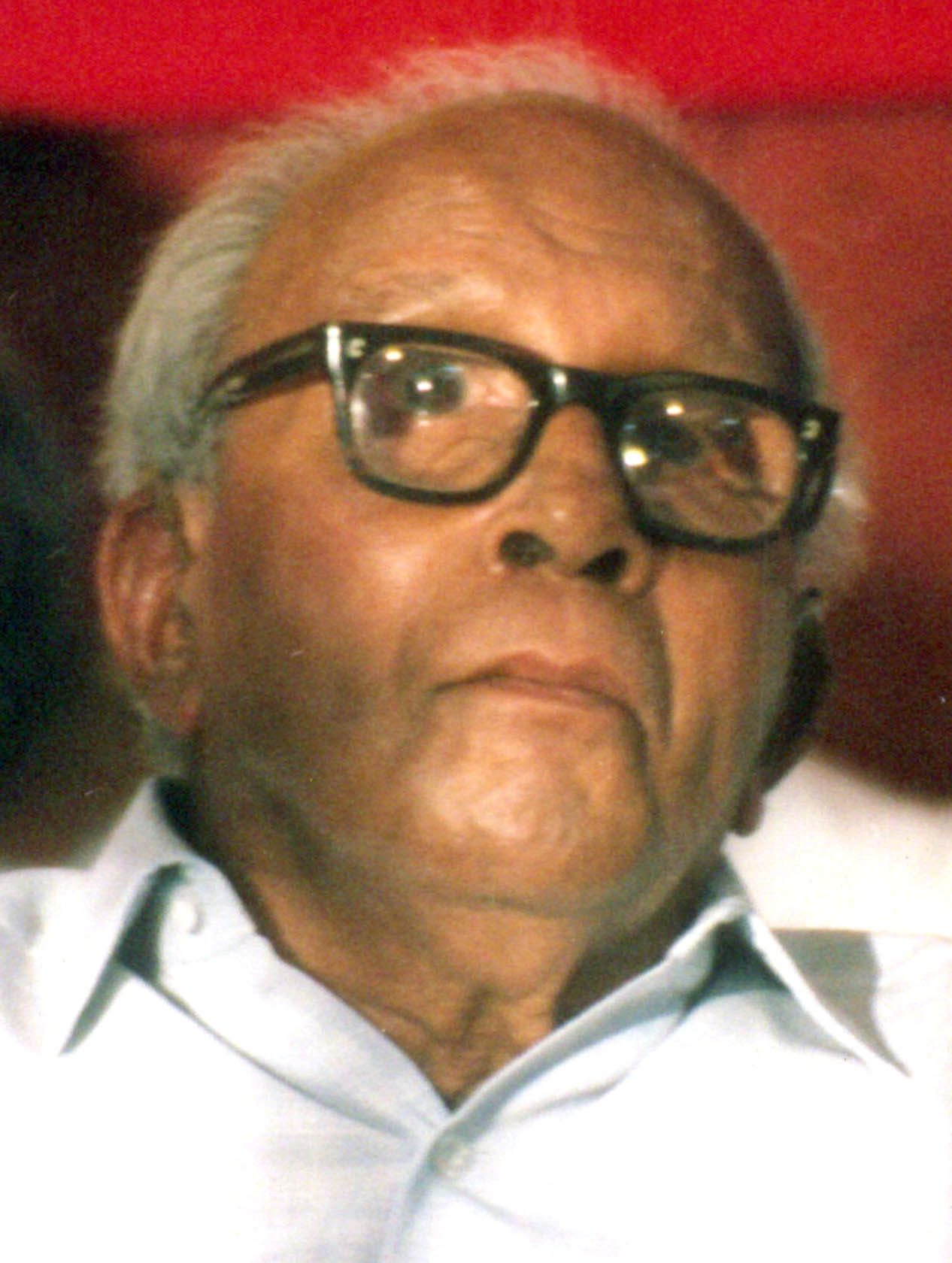

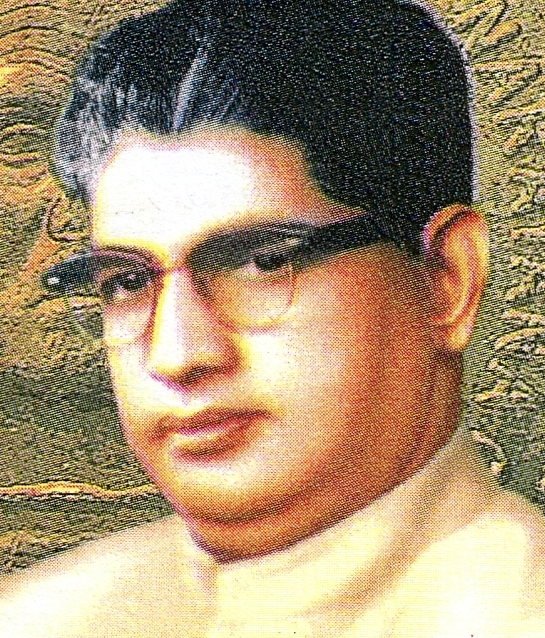

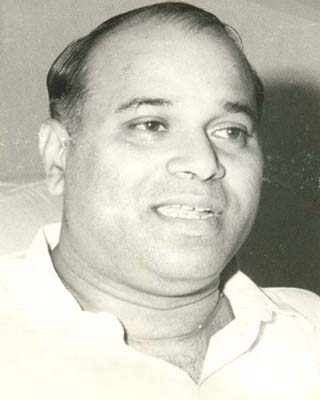
	First party	Second party	Third party
Leader	E. M. S. Namboodiripad	R. Sankar	K. M. George
Party	CPI(M)	INC	KEC
Leader's seat	Pattambi	Attingal (Lost)	Poonjar
Last election	New	63	New
Seats won	40	36	26
Seat change	N/A	▼27	N/A
Popular vote	1,257,869	2,123,660	796,291
Percentage	19.87%	33.55%	12.58%
Swing	N/A	▼0.87%	N/A
Chief Minister before election
R. Sankar
INC
Elected Chief Minister
Vacant
President's Rule

The Kerala Legislative Assembly election of 1965 was held to elect members to the third Niyamasabha. Communist Party of India (Marxist), which was the splinter faction of Communist Party of India, emerged as the largest party in the assembly with 40 seats, followed by Indian National Congress with 36. However no single party could form a ministry commanding majority and hence this election is considered abortive. On March 25, President's rule was invoked for the fourth time. The state was governed under the president from 1964 to 1967.

== Background ==
Both the Indian National Congress and the Communist Party of India went through big changes during the period that preceded the elections in 1965. Congress was split and a new state party Kerala Congress was formed.

Communist Party of India also went through a split during this time, forming CPI(M).

== Constituencies ==
There were 133 constituencies in total, out of which 120 were General Category, 11 Scheduled Castes, and 2 Scheduled Tribe seats.

== Political parties ==
Three national parties - Indian National Congress, Communist Party of India and Communist Party of India (Marxist) and three state level parties Kerala Congress, Indian Union Muslim League and Samyukta Socialist Party took part in the elections.

== Results ==
Summary of results of the 1965 Kerala Legislative Assembly election
Political Party	Flag	Seats Contested	Won	Net Change in seats	% of Seats	Votes	Vote %	Change in vote %
Communist Party of India (Marxist)		73	40	New	30.08	1,257,869	19.87	New
Indian National Congress	INC Flag Official	133	36	▼27	27.07	2,123,660	33.55	▼0.87
Kerala Congress		54	26	New	17.29	796,291	12.58	New
Samyukta Socialist Party		29	13	New	9.77	514,689	8.13	New
Indian Union Muslim League		16	6		4.51	242,529	3.83	
Communist Party of India		79	3	▼28	2.26	525,456	8.3	▼30.84
Independent		174	12	▲7	9.02	869,843	13.74	N/A
		Total Seats	133		Voters	6,330,337		

=== By Constituency ===
A. C. NO.	Assembly Constituency Name	Category	Winner Candidates Name	Gender	Party	Vote	Runner-up Candidates Name	Gender	Party	Vote
1	Manjeshwar	GEN	Mahabala Bhandary	M	INC	20983	M. Ramanna Rai	M	CPI(M)	15139
2	Kasaragod	GEN	E. Abdul Kader	M	IND	21923	K.A. Shetty	M	INC	19784
3	Hosdurg	GEN	N.K. Balakrishnan	M	SSP	30558	M.Kunhikannan Nambiar	M	INC	17116
4	Nileswar	GEN	V.V. Kunhamboo	M	CPI(M)	30547	K.V. Kunhambu	M	INC	14175
5	Edakkad	GEN	C. Kannan	M	CPI(M)	30716	P.P. Lakshmanan	M	INC	23072
6	Cannanore	GEN	K.M. Aboobacker	M	IND	31448	P. Madhavan	M	INC	24522
7	Madayi	GEN	K.P.R. Gopalan	M	CPI(M)	26784	P. Gopalan	M	INC	15034
8	Payyannur	GEN	A.V. Kunhambu	M	CPI(M)	29537	V.K. Kunhikrishnan Nair	M	INC	17062
9	Taliparamba	GEN	K.P. Raghava Poduval	M	CPI(M)	29430	N.C. Varghese	M	INC	22638
10	Irikkur	GEN	E.P. Krishnan Nambiar	M	CPI(M)	27284	A. Narayanana Nambissan	M	INC	17033
11	Kuthuparamba	GEN	K.K. Abu	M	SSP	26498	M.P. Moidu Hajee	M	INC	20416
12	Tellicherry	GEN	P. Gopalan	M	CPI(M)	27981	P. Nanu	M	INC	19766
13	Peringalam	GEN	P. Ramunni Kurup	M	SSP	34580	N. Madusudhanan Nambiar	M	INC	19797
14	North Wynad	(ST)	K.K. Annan	M	IND	18078	M.V. Rajan	M	INC	10461
15	Badagara	GEN	M. Krishnan	M	SSP	35197	T. Krishnan	M	INC	13262
16	Nadapuram	GEN	C. H. Kanaran	M	CPI(M)	26224	K.P. Padmanabhan	M	INC	14582
17	Meppayur	GEN	M.K Kelu	M	CPI(M)	23998	K. Gopalan	M	INC	15555
18	Quilandy	GEN	K. B. Menon	M	SSP	33910	E. Rajagopalan Nair	M	INC	24903
19	Perambra	GEN	V.V. Dakshina Mootrhy Variar	M	CPI(M)	25065	K.T. Kunhiraman Nayar	M	INC	16205
20	Balusseri	GEN	A.K. Appu	M	SSP	29593	O.K. Govindan	M	INC	23407
21	Kunnamangalam	GEN	V. Kuttikrishnan Nair	M	SSP	30360	P.K. Imbichi Ahammed Haji	M	INC	13178
22	Kalpetta	GEN	B. Wellingdon	M	IND	17549	Joseph Pulikkanael	M	IND	11187
23	South Wynad	(ST)	M. Ramunni	M	SSP	20256	Nochamvayal Veliya Moopan	M	INC	15076
24	Calicut- I	GEN	P.C. Raghavan Nair	M	CPI(M)	27671	M. Kamalam	F	INC	25125
25	Calicut- II	GEN	P.M. Aboobacker	M	IND	30025	K.P. Ramunnimenon	M	INC	21121
26	Beypore	GEN	K. Chatunny	M	CPI(M)	25342	O.T. Saradakrishnan	F	INC	14958
27	Tirurangadi	GEN	K. Avukaderkutty Naha	M	ML	20836	T.P. Kunhalankutty	M	INC	19594
28	Tanur	GEN	C. Muhamed Kutty	M	ML	25351	K. Kunhimohammed	M	INC	12338
29	Tirur	GEN	K. Moideenkutty Haji	M	ML	18366	M. Padmanabhan Nair	M	INC	14696
30	Kuttippuram	GEN	Mohisin Bin Ahamed	M	ML	17878	T.R. Kunhikrishnan	M	CPI(M)	12402
31	Kondotty	GEN	M. Moideenkutty Haji	M	ML	24757	M. Usman	M	INC	15174
32	Malappuram	GEN	M.P.M. Ahmed Kurikkal	M	ML	25251	P. Ahamed Kutty	M	CPI(M)	12745
33	Manjeri	(SC)	U. Uthaman	M	IND	20060	V. Eacharan	M	INC	13124
34	Nilambur	GEN	K. Kunhali	M	CPI(M)	17914	A. Mohamed	M	INC	10753
35	Ponnani	GEN	K.G. Karunakaramenon	M	INC	15881	V.P.C. Thangal	M	ML	14609
36	Thrithala	(SC)	E.T. Kunhan	M	CPI(M)	21815	K. Kunhambu	M	INC	15806
37	Pattambi	GEN	E.M. Sankaran Namboodiripad	M	CPI(M)	19992	K.P. Thangal	M	CPI	12213
38	Ottapalam	GEN	P.P. Krishnan	M	CPI(M)	20802	K. Sankaranarayanana	M	INC	12560
39	Sreekrishnapuram	GEN	C. Govinda Panicker	M	CPI(M)	16571	M. Narayana Kurup	M	INC	9663
40	Mankada	GEN	P. Muhammedkutty	M	CPI(M)	17875	K.K. Sayed Ussan Koya	M	ML	16582
41	Perinthalmanna	GEN	C. Koya	M	CPI(M)	17426	K. Hassan Gani	M	ML	12388
42	Mannarghat	GEN	P.A. Sankaran	M	CPI(M)	16099	A.Chandran Nair	M	INC	7503
43	Palghat	GEN	M.V. Vasu	M	CPI(M)	17747	K. Pyarijan Sunna Sahib	M	INC	13260
44	Malampuzha	GEN	M.P. Kunhiraman	M	CPI(M)	27835	C.V. Ramachandran	M	INC	13484
45	Chittur	GEN	K. A. Sivarama Bharathy	M	SSP	24630	Leela Damodara Menon	F	INC	17100
46	Kollengode	GEN	C. Vasudeva Menon	M	CPI(M)	22749	P. N. Krishnan	M	INC	13274
47	Alathur	GEN	R. Krishnan	M	CPI(M)	26328	A. Narayanan	M	INC	12472
48	Kuzhalmannam	(SC)	O. Koran	M	SSP	23477	K. Eacharan	M	INC	12021
49	Chelakara	(SC)	K. K. Balakrishnan	M	INC	17283	C. K. Chakrapani	M	CPI(M)	17177
50	Wadakkanchery	GEN	N. K. Seshan	M	SSP	22352	V. K. Achutha Menon	M	INC	19045
51	Kunnamkulam	GEN	T. K. Krishnan	M	CPI(M)	26448	M. K. Raja	M	INC	25354
52	Manalur	GEN	I. M. Velayudhan	M	INC	23009	B. Wellington	M	IND	15310
53	Trichur	GEN	T. P. Seetharaman	M	INC	22777	C. L. Varkey	M	CPI(M)	18572
54	Ollur	GEN	A. V. Aryan	M	CPI(M)	20180	P. R. Francis	M	INC	19475
55	Irinjalakuda	GEN	K. T. Achuthan	M	INC	19302	P. Appukutta Menon	M	IND	13143
56	Kodakara	GEN	P. S. Namboodiri	M	CPI	18755	C. G. Janardhanan	M	INC	16393
57	Chalakudi	GEN	P. P. George	M	INC	18873	B. C. Varughese	M	IND	14165
58	Mala	GEN	K. Karunakaran	M	INC	18044	K. A. Thomas	M	CPI	13282
59	Guruvayoor	GEN	P. K. Abdul Majeed	M	IND	20322	M. V. Aboobacker	M	INC	19831
60	Nattika	GEN	Ramu Kariat	M	IND	27704	V. K. Kumaran	M	INC	24418
61	Cranganore	GEN	K. C. M. Mather	M	INC	25330	Gopalakrishna Menon	M	CPI	13847
62	Ankamali	GEN	John	M	KC	19828	Geervacis	M	INC	13840
63	Vadakkekara	GEN	Abdul Jaleel	M	IND	25288	K. R. Vijayan	M	INC	22935
64	Parur	GEN	K. T. George	M	INC	24678	K. G. Raman Menon	M	SSP	14402
65	Narakkal	GEN	K. C. Abraham	M	INC	24713	A. S. Purushothaman	M	CPI(M)	17141
66	Mattancherry	GEN	M. P. Muhamed Jaferkhan	M	IND	24933	K. K. Vishwanathan	M	INC	15951
67	Palluruthy	GEN	P. Gangadharan	M	CPI(M)	22717	A. L. Jacob	M	INC	19151
68	Thrippunithura	GEN	T. K. Ramakrishnan	M	CPI(M)	24387	Paul	M	INC	22016
69	Ernakulam	GEN	P. J. Alexander	M	INC	20853	T. A. Mohammed Kunju	M	IND	9999
70	Alwaye	GEN	V. P. Marakkar	M	INC	22659	P. K. Kunju	M	SSP	21556
71	Perumbavoor	GEN	P. Govinda Pillai	M	CPI(M)	21265	C. P. Poulose	M	KC	12874
72	Kunnathunad	(SC)	K. K. Madhavan	M	INC	22635	M, K. Krishnan	M	CPI(M)	20834
73	Kothamangalam	GEN	K. M. George	M	KC	18744	N. P. Varghese	M	INC	18198
74	Muvattupuzha	GEN	A. T. Pathrose	M	KC	18929	E. P. Poulose	M	INC	14659
75	Thodupuzha	GEN	C. A. Mathew	M	KC	18937	Zacharia Chacko	M	IND	14844
76	Karimannoor	GEN	Chacko Kuriakose	M	KC	15897	M. M. Thomas	M	IND	11650
77	Devicolam	(SC)	G. Varathan	M	CPI(M)	16472	T. Murukesan	M	INC	15483
78	Udumbanchola	GEN	K. T. Jacob	M	CPI	17374	M. Mathachan	M	KC	15627
79	Permade	(SC)	K. I. Rajan	M	CPI(M)	12345	N. Ganapathy	M	INC	8835
80	Kanjirappally	GEN	Kurian Varkey	M	KC	18206	Mustafa Kamal	M	INC	17468
81	Vazhoor	GEN	K. Narayana Kurup	M	KC	20629	N. Govinda Menon	M	INC	9611
82	Changanacherry	GEN	K. J. Chacko	M	KC	21134	K. G. Neelakantan Nambudiripad	M	CPI	16893
83	Puthuppally	GEN	E. M. George	M	CPI(M)	15571	Thomas Rajan	M	INC	13736
84	Kottayam	GEN	M. K. George	M	CPI(M)	17880	M. P. Govindan Nair	M	INC	14396
85	Ettumanoor	GEN	M. M. Joseph	M	KC	23400	Mustafa Khani Rawther	M	INC	15178
86	Akalakunnam	GEN	J. A. Chacko	M	KC	22913	Vasudevan Kartha	M	IND	13755
87	Poonjar	GEN	P. D. Thommen	M	IND	21975	V. I. Purushothaman	M	IND	14926
88	Palai	GEN	K. M. Mani	M	KC	25833	V. T. Thomas	M	IND	16248
89	Kaduthuruthy	GEN	Joseph Chazhikattu	M	KC	26597	M. C. Abraham	M	INC	12344
90	Vaikom	GEN	P. Parameswaran	M	INC	15255	K. N. Narayanan Nair	M	KC	15167
91	Aroor	GEN	K. R. Gouri Thomas	F	CPI(M)	19426	Devaki Krishnan	F	INC	14843
92	Sherthala	GEN	C. V. Jacob	M	KC	15070	P. S. Karthikeyan	M	INC	13192
93	Mararikulam	GEN	Suseela Gopalan	F	CPI(M)	22424	P. Karunakara Thandar	M	INC	16707
94	Alleppey	GEN	G. Chidambara Iyer	M	INC	13997	T. V. Thomas	M	CPI	12693
95	Ambalapuzha	GEN	K. S. Krishna Kurup	M	INC	16657	V. S. Atchuthanandan	M	CPI(M)	14330
96	Kuttanad	GEN	Thomas John	M	KC	25319	V. Z. Job	M	INC	15067
97	Haripad	GEN	K. P. Ramakrishnan Nair	M	INC	23644	C. B. Chandrasekhara Warrier	M	CPI(M)	17178
98	Kayamkulam	GEN	Sukumaran	M	CPI(M)	17522	Prabhakaran	M	INC	17179
99	Thiruvalla	GEN	E. J. Jacob	M	KC	27809	K. Kurian Joseph	M	INC	12899
100	Kallooppara	GEN	George Thomas	M	KC	25422	K. R. Keshava Pillai	M	CPI(M)	9774
101	Aranmula	GEN	N. Bhaskaran Nair	M	KC	22000	K. Velayudhan Nair	M	INC	17031
102	Chengannur	GEN	K. R. Saraswathi Amma	F	KC	26248	N. S. Krishna Pillai	M	INC	12135
103	Mavelikara	GEN	K. K. Chellappan Pillai	M	INC	19391	G. Gopinatha Pillai	M	SSP	14058
104	Pandalam	(SC)	P. K. Kunjachan	M	CPI(M)	20241	T. Kandankaly	M	INC	15091
105	Ranni	GEN	E. M. Thomas	M	KC	21707	M. Sanny	M	INC	14005
106	Pathanamthitta	GEN	V. I. Idiculla	M	KC	24574	K. Karunakaran Nair	M	IND	19222
107	Konni	GEN	P. J. Thomas	M	INC	17064	K. M. George	M	KC	14972
108	Pathanapuram	(SC)	P. C. Adichan	M	CPI	13948	P. K. Ramachandra Das	M	INC	13172
109	Punalur	GEN	C. M. Stephen	M	INC	14599	K. Krishna Pillai	M	CPI	13787
110	Chadayamangalam	GEN	D. Damodaran Potty	M	SSP	16291	N. Bhaskaran Pillai	M	INC	16269
111	Kottarakkara	GEN	R. Balakrishna Pillai	M	KC	27534	E. Chandrasekharan Nair	M	CPI	19395
112	Kunnathur	(SC)	T. Krishnan	M	KC	15734	T. Kesavan	M	CPI	12297
113	Adoor	GEN	K. K. Gopalan Nair	M	KC	17651	P. Ramalinga Ayyar	M	CPI	15287
114	Krishnapuram	GEN	M. K. Hemachandran	M	INC	19842	Unnikrishna Pillai	M	CPI	16229
115	Karunagappally	GEN	Kunjukrishnan	M	INC	19762	Bhasi	M	IND	17468
116	Quilon	GEN	Henry Austin	M	INC	13749	T. K. Divakaran	M	IND	13499
117	Kundara	GEN	Sankara Narayana Pillai	M	INC	20166	Chitharanjan	M	CPI	14126
118	Eravipuram	GEN	Abdul Rahim	M	INC	19114	Sankaran Unni	M	IND	18458
119	Chathannoor	GEN	Thankanppan Pillai	M	IND	17462	P. Ravindran	M	CPI	16694
120	Varkala	GEN	K. Shahul Hameed	M	INC	21092	V. Radhakrishnan	M	CPI(M)	12381
121	Attingal	GEN	K. Anirudhan	M	CPI(M)	25598	R .Sankar	M	INC	23515
122	Kilimanoor	(SC)	C. K. Balakrishnan	M	CPI(M)	17911	K. Sivadasan	M	INC	17567
123	Vamanapuram	GEN	M.Kunjukrishna Pillai	M	INC	18017	Vasudevan Pillai	M	CPI(M)	16968
124	Aryanad	GEN	V. Sankaran	M	INC	11187	M. Abdul Majeed	M	SSP	9890
125	Nedumangad	GEN	S. Varadarajan Nair	M	INC	21674	Neelakantaru Pandarathil	M	CPI	9625
126	Kazhakuttam	GEN	N. Lakshmanan	M	INC	17379	K. P. Alikunju	M	CPI(M)	14011
127	Trivandrum I	GEN	B. Madhavan Nair	M	SSP	14865	M. N. Gopinathan Nair	M	INC	14638
128	Trivandrum I I	GEN	Wilfred Sebastian	M	INC	18129	E. P. Eapen	M	SSP	14286
129	Nemom	GEN	M. Sadasivan	M	CPI(M)	17756	P. Narayan Nair	M	INC	15043
130	Kovalam	GEN	M. Kunjukrishnan Nadar	M	INC	19896	Camalias Moraes	M	KC	8972
131	Vilappil	GEN	M. Bhaskarannair	M	INC	21850	G. Krishnan Nair	M	SSP	15653
132	Neyyattinkara	GEN	G. Chandrasekhara Pillai	M	INC	18003	Sathyanesan	M	CPI(M)	15177
133	Parassala	GEN	N. Gamaliel	M	INC	25949	S. Sukumaran Nair	M	SSP	12246

== Government formation ==
No party or group was able to form a government due to the fractured nature of results. The result was the dissolution of the assembly again, and the state was again under President's Rule.

== See also ==
- 1960 Kerala Legislative Assembly election
- 1967 Kerala Legislative Assembly election
