= Anthikad Karthyayani Temple =

Hindu temple in Thrissur district, Kerala, India

- Karthyayani Temple, Anthikad, Thrissur, Kerala

Religion
- Affiliation: Hinduism
- District: Thrissur
- Deity: Bhagavathi

Location
- Location: Anthikad
- State: Kerala
- Country: India
- Coordinates: 10°27′30″N 76°07′23″E

Architecture
- Type: Architecture of Kerala
- Elevation: 34.01 m (112 ft)

Anthikad Karthyayani Bhagavathy Temple is a Hindu temple in Anthikad, Thrissur district, Kerala, India. Cochin Devaswom Board controls the temple. It is one of the 108 Durga temples in Kerala.
