= F. Raja =

Indian politician (born 1975)

Francis Raja

Member of the Kerala Legislative Assembly
- Incumbent
- Assumed office 2026
- Preceded by: A. Raja
- Constituency: Devikulam Assembly constituency

Personal details
- Born: 1975 (age 50–51) Devikulam, Idukki district, Kerala, India
- Party: Indian National Congress
- Parent: Francis (father)
- Occupation: Politician; Farmer

Francis Raja (born 1975) is an Indian politician from Kerala. He is a member of the Kerala Legislative Assembly from the Devikulam Assembly constituency, which is reserved for Scheduled Caste community, in Idukki district representing the Indian National Congress.

== Early life ==
Raja is from Devikulam, Idukki district, Kerala. He is the son of Francis. He studied till Class 10 at Government High School, Munnar and passed the Secondary School Leaving Certificate (SSLC) examinations in 1990. He is a farmer and his wife is also into farming. He declared assets worth Rs.14 crore in his affidavit to the Election Commission of India.

== Career ==
Raja won the Devikulam Assembly constituency representing the Indian National Congress in the 2026 Kerala Legislative Assembly election. He polled 50,590 votes and defeated his nearest rival and sitting MLA, A. Raja of the Communist Party of India (Marxist), by a margin of 5,233 votes.
