= 1960 Kerala Legislative Assembly election =

- 1 February 1960

All 126 seats in the Kerala Legislative Assembly 64 seats needed for a majority
- Turnout: 85.72% (▲20.23%)
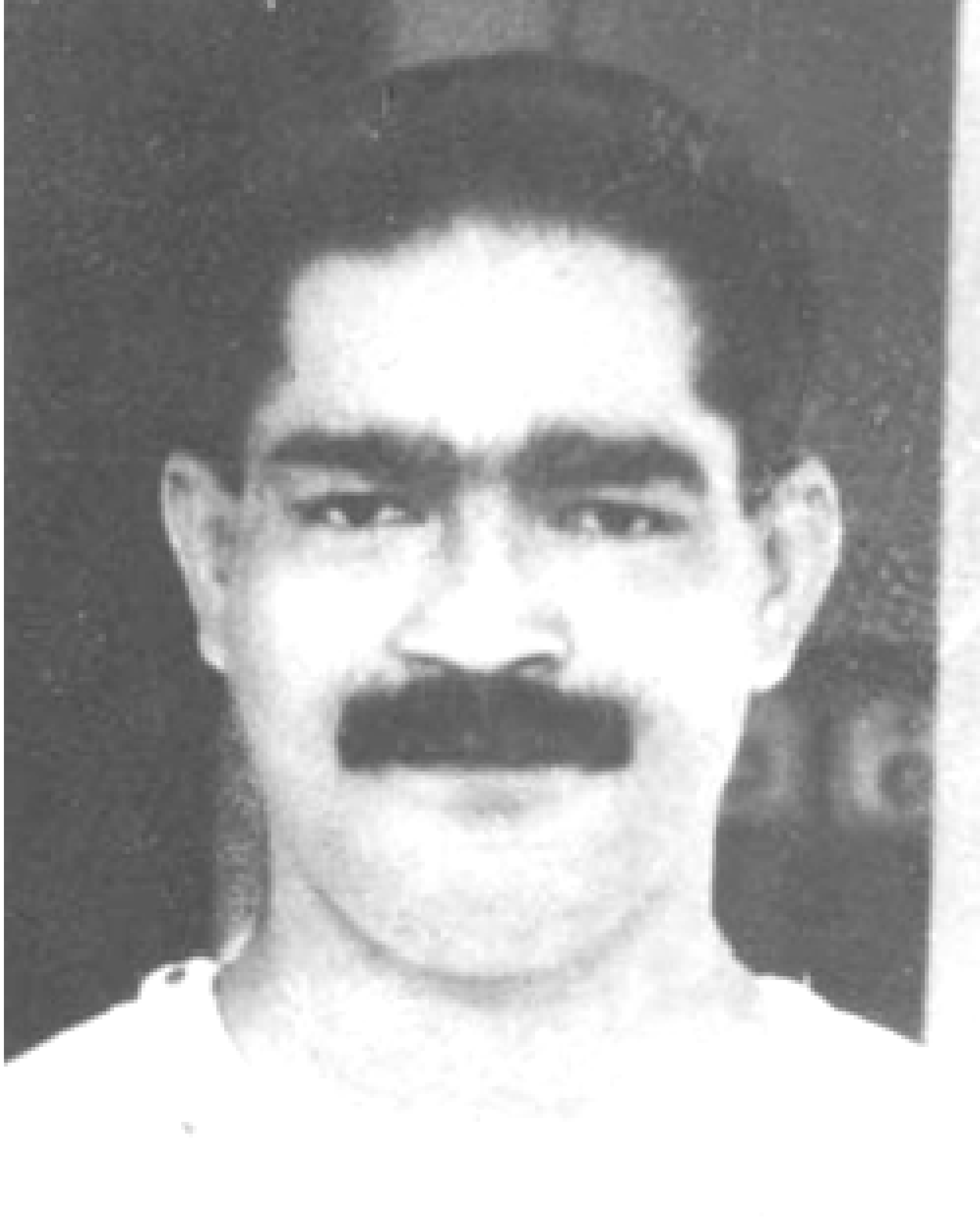

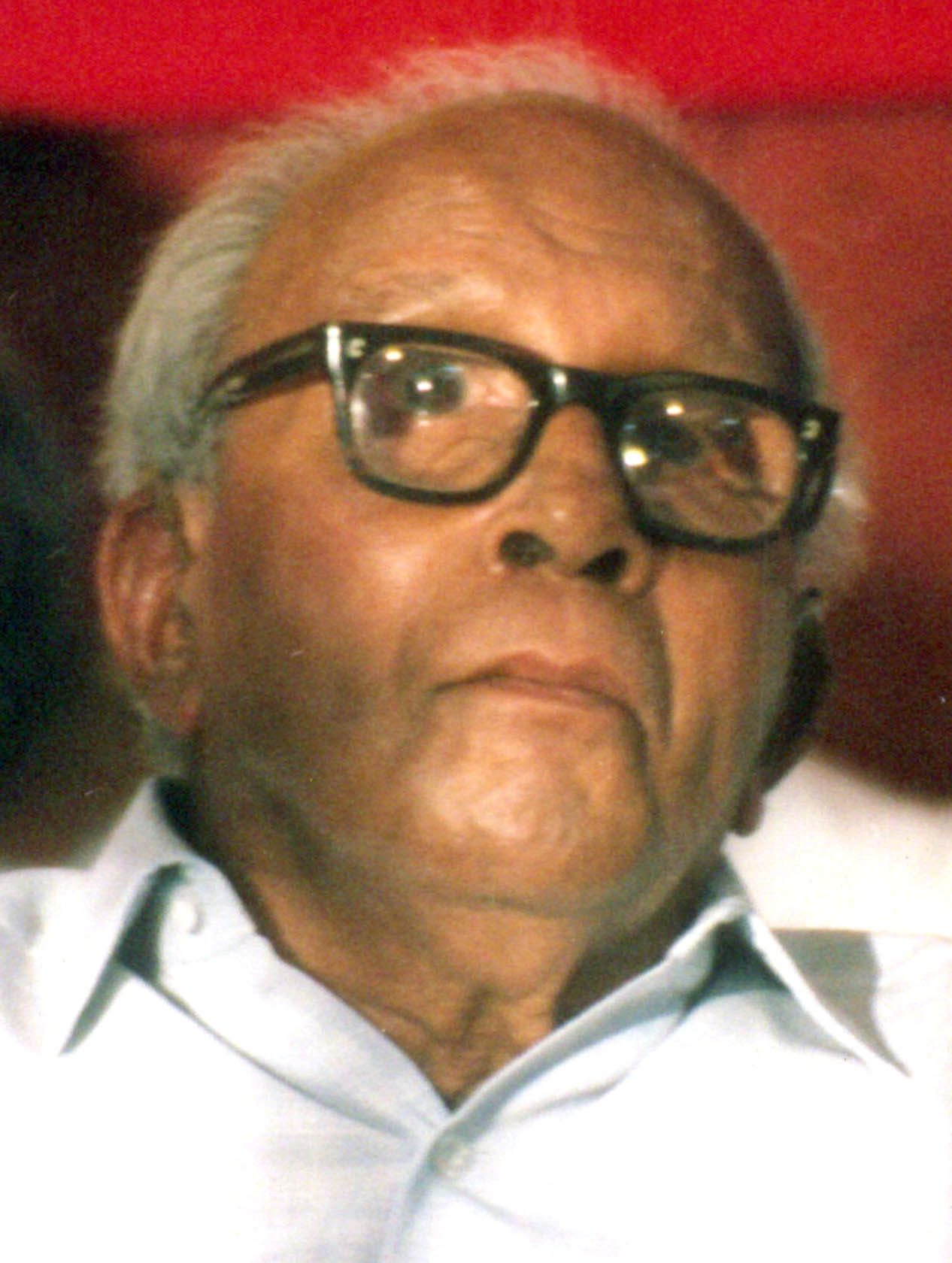
	First party	Second party
Leader	P. T. Chacko	E. M. S. Namboodiripad
Party	INC	CPI
Leader's seat	Meenachil Assembly constituency	Pattambi Assembly constituency
Last election	43	60
Seats won	63	29
Seat change	▲20	▼31
Popular vote	2,789,556	3,171,732
Percentage	34.42%	39.14%
Swing	▼3.43%	▲3.86%
Chief Minister before election
Vacant
President's rule
Elected Chief Minister
Pattom A. Thanu Pillai
PSP

The Kerala Legislative Assembly election of 1960 was the second assembly election in the Indian state of Kerala. The elections were held on 1 February 1960.

== Background ==
In the 1957 elections in Kerala, the Communist Party of India formed the government with the support of five independents. But in 1959, the Central Government dismissed the democratically elected government through the controversial Article 356 of the Indian Constitution following "The Liberation Struggle", even though the elected communist government was enjoying majority support within the legislature. After a short period of the President's rule, fresh elections were called in 1960.

== Constituencies ==
There were 114 legislative assembly constituencies in the Kerala Legislative Assembly, 1957. Out of these 102 were single-member constituencies while the number of double-member constituencies was 12. One constituency was reserved for Schedule Caste. There were 64,77,665 electors in single-member constituencies, while in double-member constituencies there were 15,63,333 electors. Total 312 candidates contested for the 126 seats of the 114 constituencies in the Assembly. Poll percentage was 85.72%, an increase of 20.23% from 65.49% in 1957 assembly elections.

== Political parties ==
Three national parties, Communist Party of India, Indian National Congress, and Praja Socialist Party along with the state party Muslim League took part in the assembly election. In these elections, the Indian National Congress, Praja Socialist Party, and Indian Union Muslim League formed a pre-poll alliance to counter the Communist Party of India. Together they fielded 125 candidates and supported an independent candidate, while the Communist Party of India fielded 108 candidates and gave party support to 16 independents.

== Results ==
Summary of results of the 1960 Kerala Legislative Assembly election
Political Party	Flag	Seats Contested	Won	Net Change in seats	% of Seats	Votes	Vote %	Change in vote %	Vote % in contested seats
Indian National Congress	INC Flag Official	80	63	▲20	50.00	2,789,556	34.42	▼3.43	45.37
Communist Party of India		108	29	▼31	23.02	3,171,732	39.14	▲3.86	43.79
Praja Socialist Party		33	20	▲11	15.87	1,146,028	14.14	▼3.38	38.41
IUML	Indian Union Muslim League	12	11	New	8.73	401,925	4.96	New	47.79
Independent		61	3	▼11	4.17	488,699	5.93	-5.61	13.96
		Total Seats	126	Voters	9,604,331	Turnout	8,232,572 (85.72%)		

=== By constituency ===
A. C. NO.	Assembly Constituency Name	Category	Winner Candidates Name	Party	Vote	Runner-up Candidates Name	Party	Vote	Winning Party	Margin
1	Parassala	GEN	M. Kunjukrishnan Nadar	IND	18,848	Thangayyan	CPI	18,096	IND	752
2	Neyyattinkara	GEN	P. Narayanan Thampi	PSP	31,707	R. Janardhanan Nair	CPI	30,756	PSP	956
3	Vilappil	GEN	Ponnara G. Sreedhar	PSP	27,929	Surendranath	CPI	24,732	PSP	3,197
4	Nemom	GEN	Viswambaran	PSP	28,573	A. Sadasivan	CPI	22,918	PSP	5,655
5	Trivandrum I	GEN	B. P. Eapen	PSP	27,328	Krishnan Nair	CPI	20,385	PSP	6,943
6	Trivandrum II	GEN	Pattom Thanupillai	PSP	35,175	K. Anirudhan	CPI	25,917	PSP	9,258
7	Ullur	GEN	M. Alikunju Sastri	PSP	30,269	K. P. Alikunju	CPI	24,939	PSP	5,330
8	Aryanad	GEN	Antony Dcruz	PSP	25,351	K. C. George	CPI	22,258	PSP	3,093
9	Nedumangad	GEN	N. Neelakandaru Pandarathil	CPI	27,797	P. S. Nataraja Pillai	PSP	25,685	CPI	2,112
10	Attingal	GEN	N. Kunjuraman	INC	28,050	R. Prakasam	CPI	27,920	INC	130
11	Varkala	GEN	Balakrishnan	M	CPI	50231	Balakrishnan	M	CPI	50114
12	Eravipuram	GEN	Ravindran	M	CPI	25548	Bhaskara Pillai	M	PSP	23689
13	Quilon	GEN	A. A. Rahim	M	INC	25083	P. K. Sukumaran	M	CPI	18791
14	Thrikkadavur	GEN	C. M. Stephen	M	INC	48618	Krishnan	M	INC	46244
15	Karunagappally	GEN	Baby John	M	IND	21238	Kunjukrishnan	M	INC	21030
16	Krishnapuram	GEN	P. K. Kunju	M	PSP	28247	Karthikeyan	M	INC	27583
17	Kayamkulam	GEN	Aysha Bai	F	CPI	30727	Hemachandran	M	INC	29467
18	Karthigapally	GEN	R. Sugathan	M	CPI	30832	A. Achuthan	M	PSP	28433
19	Haripad	GEN	N. S. Krishna Pillai	M	INC	31389	Ramakrishna Pillai	M	IND	21080
20	Mavelikara	GEN	Gopala Kurup	M	CPI	54340	Kunjachan	M	CPI	54042
21	Kunnathur	GEN	G. Candrasekhara Pillai	M	INC	51101	P. C. Adichen	M	CPI	49253
22	Kottarakkara	(SC)	Damodaran Pott	M	PSP	27909	Chandrasekharan Nair	M	CPI	25741
23	Chadayamangalam	GEN	K. Bhargavan	M	CPI	25412	M. Abdul Majeed	M	PSP	25290
24	Pathanapuram	GEN	Balakrishna Pillai	M	INC	35136	Rajagopalan Nair	M	CPI	30601
25	Punalur	GEN	K. Krishna Pillai	M	CPI	26415	Sathibhai	F	INC	23042
26	Ranni	GEN	Vayala Idicula	M	INC	34560	E. M. Thomas	M	CPI	24426
27	Pathanamthitta	GEN	C. K. Harichandran Nair	M	PSP	36660	K. Karunakaran Nair	M	CPI	28194
28	Aranmula	GEN	K. Gopinathan Pillai	M	INC	31899	R. Gopalakrishna Pillai	M	CPI	20295
29	Kallooppara	GEN	M. M. Mathai	M	INC	32270	Viwanathan Nair	M	IND	14015
30	Thiruvalla	GEN	P. Chacko	M	INC	36092	Padmanabhan Thampi	M	CPI	20026
31	Chengannur	GEN	K. R. Saraswathy Amma	F	INC	31964	R. Rajasekharan Thampi	M	CPI	19063
32	Alleppey	GEN	Nabisath Beevi	F	INC	33443	T. V. Thomas	M	CPI	29650
33	Mararikulam	GEN	S. Kumaran	M	CPI	31826	Devaki Krishnan	F	INC	24476
34	Sherthala	GEN	K. R. Gouri	F	CPI	29883	Subramania Pillai	M	INC	28377
35	Aroor	GEN	Karthikeyan	M	INC	29403	Sadasivan	M	CPI	27265
36	Thakashi	GEN	Thomas John	M	INC	33079	Gopalakrishna Pillai	M	IND	20961
37	Changanacherry	GEN	N. Bhaskaran Nair	M	INC	31935	A. M. Kalyanskrishnan Nair	M	CPI	22542
38	Vazhoor	GEN	Velappan	M	INC	27566	Purushothaman Pillai	M	CPI	20504
39	Kanjirappally	GEN	K. T. Thomas	M	INC	28310	K. S. Mustafaz Kamal	M	IND	21422
40	Puthuppally	GEN	P. C. Cherian	M	INC	30260	M. Thomas	M	CPI	22349
41	Kottayam	GEN	M. P. Govindan Nair	M	INC	29020	N. Raghava Kurup	M	CPI	27863
42	Ettumanoor	GEN	George Joseph Podipara	M	INC	30925	Sankunny Menon	M	CPI	22367
43	Meenachil	GEN	P. T. Chacko (Thomas)	M	INC	30745	Jacob Cherian	M	CPI	15644
44	Vaikom	GEN	Sreenivasan	M	CPI	32707	Pavithran	M	INC	30638
45	Kaduthuruthy	GEN	Abraham Chummar	M	INC	32615	Umadevi Antharjanam	F	CPI	17316
46	Ramamangalam	GEN	E. P. Poulose	M	INC	32448	P. V. Abraham	M	CPI	19871
47	Muvattupuzha	GEN	K. M. George	M	INC	33520	K. C. Abraham	M	IND	20907
48	Devikulam	GEN	Murugesan Thiruvengadan	M	INC	75141	M. M. Sundaram	M	CPI	72801
49	Thodupuzha	GEN	Mathew	M	INC	34156	Jose Abraham	M	CPI	13899
50	Karikode	GEN	Kosumom Joseph	F	INC	29907	Saidu Monammad Sahib	M	IND	13621
51	Poonjar	GEN	T. A. Thomman	M	INC	35722	Kumara Menon	M	CPI	14364
52	Puliyannur	GEN	K. M. Joseph Chazhikattu	M	PSP	34781	Ulahanan	M	CPI	14503
53	Palluruthy	GEN	Alexander Parambithara	M	INC	33541	Kerala Varma Thampuran	M	IND	26304
54	Mattancherry	GEN	K. K. Viswanathan	M	INC	32997	Ratnam Ranganath Rai	F	IND	18411
55	Neenakkal	GEN	K. C. Abraham	M	INC	31212	P. R. Leghnan	M	CPI	28322
56	Ernakulam	GEN	A. L. Jacob	M	INC	32001	V. Viswanatha Menon	M	CPI	25108
57	Kanayannur	GEN	T. K. Ramakrishnan	M	CPI	31582	K. R. Narayanan	M	INC	29101
58	Alwaye	GEN	T. O. Chacko	M	INC	34484	M. M. Abdul Kadir	M	CPI	28867
59	Perumbavoor	GEN	K. M. Chacko	M	INC	31718	Govinda Pillai	M	CPI	25918
60	Kothakulangara	GEN	M. A. Antony	M	INC	38681	Kurian	M	CPI	19872
61	Parur	GEN	K. A. Damodara Menon	M	INC	30369	N. Siran Pillai	M	CPI	26371
62	Vadakkekara	GEN	K. R. Vijayan	M	INC	27200	K. A. Balan	M	CPI	26121
63	Cranganore	GEN	P. K. Abdul Kadir	M	INC	33679	E. Gopalakrishna Menon	M	CPI	26164
64	Chalakkudy	GEN	C. G. Janardhanan	M	PSP	66618	K. K. Balakrishnan	M	INC	66454
65	Irinjalakuda	GEN	C. Achutha Menon	M	CPI	29069	P. Achutha Menon	M	PSP	28708
66	Manalur	GEN	Kuruineelakantan Namboothiripad	M	INC	30291	Joseph Mundassari	M	CPI	27677
67	Trichur	GEN	T. A. Dharmaraja Iyer	M	INC	30277	K. Balakrishna Menon	M	IND	29814
68	Ollur	GEN	P. R. Francis	M	INC	29950	V. V. Raghavan	M	CPI	27091
69	Kunnamkulam	GEN	P. R. Krishnan	M	INC	29450	T. K. Krishnan	M	CPI	26878
70	Wadakkanchery	GEN	K. Balakrishna Menon	M	PSP	46052	Kochukuttan	M	INC	45726
71	Nattika	GEN	K. T. Achuthan	M	INC	29235	T. K. Raman	M	CPI	28796
72	Guruvayoor	GEN	K. G. Karunakara	M	INC	26083	K. Damodaran	M	CPI	25075
73	Andathodu	GEN	B. V. Seethi Thangal	M	ML	26615	K. Govinda Kutty Menon	M	CPI	22621
74	Ponnani	GEN	Kunhambu Kallen	M	INC	45326	Cherukoya Thangal	M	ML	43360
75	Kushalmannam	GEN	Kuduvakottu John	M	CPI	28817	T. A. Balakrishnan	M	INC	17785
76	Alathur	GEN	R. Krishnan	M	CPI	31159	A. Sunna Sahib	M	INC	21935
77	Chittur	GEN	P. Balachandra Menon	M	CPI	48241	Narayanan Thandan	M	CPI	48156
78	Elapully	GEN	A. K. Ramankutty Nair	M	CPI	24958	T. K. Kelukutty	M	INC	18119
79	Palghat	GEN	R. Ranghava Menon	M	INC	26546	K. C. Gopalanunni	M	CPI	24788
80	Parli	GEN	A. R. Menon	M	CPI	33605	A. S. Divakaran	M	PSP	16545
Bye Polls in 1960	Parli		M.V.Vasu	M	COM	25977	A.S.Divakaran	M	PSP	13760
81	Mannarghat	GEN	Krishnan Kongaseri	M	CPI	25060	M. P. Govinda Menon	M	PSP	18999
82	Perinthalmanna	GEN	E. P. Gopalan	M	CPI	24866	Moideenkutty Melevostti	M	ML	20339
83	Ottapalam	GEN	Kunhunni Nayar	M	CPI	24741	Chandrasekhara Kurup	M	PSP	18118
84	Pattambi	GEN	E. M. Sankaran Namboodiripad	M	CPI	26478	A. Raghavan Nair	M	INC	19156
85	Mankada	GEN	P. Abdul Majeed	M	ML	24343	Pookunhi Koya Thangal	M	CPI	20037
86	Tirur	GEN	K. Moideenkutty Haji	M	ML	28518	K. P. Bavakutty	M	CPI	16603
87	Tanur	GEN	C. H. Mohammad Koya	M	ML	27893	Nadukkandy Mohammad Koya	M	CPI	8445
88	Kuttippuram	GEN	Seethi Sahib	M	ML	29073	Kunhikrishnan Thorakkadu	M	CPI	12430
89	Thirurangady	GEN	Avukkadarkutty Hajee Naha	M	ML	34749	M. Koya Kunhi Naha Hajee	M	CPI	18049
90	Malappuram	GEN	K. Hassan Gani	M	ML	32947	Sadhu P. Ahammad Kutty	M	CPI	12118
91	Manjeri	GEN	P. P. Ummer Koya	M	INC	69700	Chandayan Muniadan	M	ML	66028
92	Kandotty	GEN	M. P. M. Ahammad Kurikkal	M	ML	33167	Momukutty Moulavi	M	IND	11860
93	Kozhikode I	GEN	O. T. Sarada Krishnan	F	INC	30638	Krishnan Kallat	M	CPI	24732
94	Kozhikode I I	GEN	P. Kumaran	M	INC	33587	Appu Adiuolil	M	IND	20613
95	Chevayur	GEN	Raghavan Nair	M	CPI	29063	A. Balagopalan	M	INC	28357
96	Kunnamangalam	GEN	Leela Damodara Menon	F	INC	34539	Chathunni	M	CPI	22608
97	Koduvally	GEN	Gopalakutty Nair	M	INC	37483	M. V. Alikoya	M	IND	16214
98	Balusseri	GEN	M. Narayana Kuruf	M	PSP	32423	K. Kalandankutty	M	IND	22983
99	Quilandy	GEN	Kunhiraman Nabbiar	M	PSP	40361	Ramakrishnan	M	IND	21083
100	Perambra	GEN	P. K. Narayanan Nambiar	M	PSP	38272	Kumaran Madathil	M	CPI	27472
101	Badagara	GEN	M. Krishnan	M	PSP	32552	M. K. Kelu	M	CPI	22824
102	Nadapuram	GEN	Hameed Ali Shemnad	M	ML	34893	C. H. Kanaran	M	CPI	27846
103	Wynad	GEN	Balakrishnan Nambiar	M	INC	79235	Madhura Vazhavatta	M	INC	77380
104	Kuthuparamba	GEN	P. Ramunni Kurup	M	PSP	42338	Aboo	M	IND	18691
105	Mattannur	GEN	N. E. Balaram	M	CPI	31119	Achuthan	M	PSP	31034
106	Tellicherry	GEN	P. Kunhiraman	M	INC	28380	V. R. Krishna Iyar	M	IND	28357
107	Cannanore I	GEN	R. Sankar	M	INC	33313	Kannan Chaliyoth	M	CPI	23859
108	Cannanore II	GEN	Madhavan Pamban	M	INC	31252	K. P. Gopalan	M	CPI	27563
109	Madayi	GEN	Prahladan Gopalan	M	INC	30829	K. P. R. Gopalan	M	CPI	30568
110	Irikkur	GEN	T. C. Narayanaan Nambiar	M	CPI	31769	M. P. Moidu Hajee Melekandy	M	INC	30489
111	Nileswar	GEN	C. Kunhikrshna Nair	M	INC	59513	Koran Olaikkapurakal	M	PSP	59340
112	Hosdrug	GEN	K. Chandrasekharan	M	PSP	27862	K. Madhavan	M	CPI	22315
113	Kasaragod	GEN	M. Kunhikannan Nambiar	M	INC	19399	Anantharama Chetty	M	IND	15747
114	Manjeshwar	GEN	Kalige Mahabala Bhandary	M	IND	23129	Kamappa Master	M	CPI	13131

== Government formation ==
Congress and Praja Socialist Party alliance got the majority in the election and hence formed the government. Pattom A. Thanu Pillai of the Praja Socialist Party became the chief minister and R. Sankar of the Indian National Congress became the deputy chief minister on 22 February 1960, with eleven council ministers.

Pattam A. Thanu Pillai resigned on 26 September 1962 after he was appointed as the Governor of Punjab and R. Sankar became the first Congress Chief Minister of Kerala.

== See also ==
- The Liberation Struggle
- President's rule
- 1960 elections in India
- Pattom Thanupillai Ministry
- R. Sankar Ministry
- 1957 Kerala Legislative Assembly election
