= K. P. Prabhakaran =

Indian minister

K. P. Prabhakaran (died 11 August 2009) was a communist politician and trade unionist from Kerala, India. He was a senior leader of the Communist Party of India, served as Health Minister of Kerala for one period. At the time of his death, he was the chairman of the State Control Commission of CPI.

== Early activism ==
Prabhakaran became an activist of Balasangham, the pioneer movement of the Communist Party in Kerala, in the early 1940s. He went on to become an active cadre of the CPI. He suffered police violence when engaging in trade union struggles amongst toddy workers in Enamavu. He participated, as a delegate from Kochi, at the first state conference of CPI, which was held in Calicut. When the party was banned in 1948, he was jailed for a year.

== Trade unionism ==
Prabhakaran was president of the Enamavu Peringottukara Toddy Workers' Union for 55 years. He was also one of the founders of the District Kole Farmers' Sanghom.

In his later years, he served as vice-president of the Kerala State Committee of the All India Trade Union Congress.

== Electoral politics ==
He was elected to the legislative assembly of Travancore-Cochin in 1951, representing the Manalur constituency. In 1954 he lost the seat to Congress leader K. Karunakaran.

In 1977, he was elected to the Kerala Legislative Assembly, representing the Cherpu seat. After the election, he became Health Minister of the state. He retained the Cherpu assembly seat in the 1980 and 1982 elections.

== Death ==
Prabhakaran died at his home in Anthicad on 11 August 2009. He was cremated with full state honours on 12 August 2009 at his residence premises. During the day, his body had been put on display. Thousands of people visited the house to pay their respects. Prominent participants at the funeral included Mullappally Ramachandran (Union Minister of State for Home Affairs), Mullakkara Ratnakaran (Kerala Minister of Agriculture), Benoy Viswam (Kerala Forest Minister), Elamaram Kareem (Kerala Minister of Industries), P. R. Rajan (Communist Party of India (Marxist) Rajya Sabha member), P. C. Chacko (Thrissur Lok Sabha member) and Mar Jacob Thoomkuzhi (ex-Archbishop, Thrissur).

== Family ==
Prabhakaran was the son of Paran and Lakshmikutty. He was survived by five children, K. P. Gopalakrishnan (Engineer), K. P. Rajendran (Politician), K. P. Surendran (Engineer), K. P. Pradeep (Scientist) and K. P. Ajayan (Engineer). His son K. P. Rajendran was the Revenue Minister of Kerala from 2006–2011.
