= S. Rajendran (Keralite politician) =

Indian politician

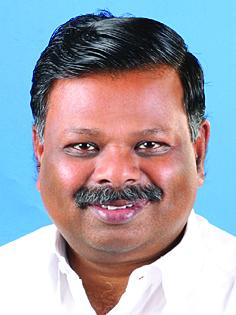

Member of the Kerala Legislative Assembly
- In office 2006–2021

Shanmugavel Rajendran is an Indian politician from BJP and the former Member of the Legislative Assembly of Kerala. He was elected in the 2006 Kerala Legislative Assembly election as the MLA from Devikulam Assembly constituency as a member of the Communist Party of India (Marxist). He subsequently also won elections from the same constituency in 2011 and 2016. He was also elected as District Panchayat president of Idukki in 2003. In 2022, his membership of the CPI(M) was suspended for a year due to his alleged efforts to defeat the CPI(M)'s candidate for the 2021 Legislative Assembly elections in Devikulam.

In 2026, he joined the Bharatiya Janata Party.
