= Parli-I =

- village
- Location in Kerala, India Parli-I (India)
- Coordinates: 10.802809°N 76.558485°E
- Country: India
- State: Kerala
- District: Palakkad

Population (2011)
  - Total: 17,369

Languages
  - Official: Malayalam, English
- Time zone: UTC+5:30 (IST)
- PIN: 678 612
- Vehicle registration: KL-09

Parli-I is a village in Palakkad district in the state of Kerala, India. Parli-I and Parli-II come under the administration of the Parli gram panchayat.

Parli is known for the starting point of Bharathapuzha which is the second longest river in Kerala. Parali is the site of a bridge, built in 1852 by the British administration and still standing.
