= E. P. Poulose =

Indian lawyer and politician (1909–1983)

Minister for Food and Agriculture, Kerala
- In office 22 February 1960 – 10 September 1964
- Chief Minister: Pattom A. Thanu Pillai; R. Sankar
- Preceded by: K. C. George
- Succeeded by: M. N. Govindan Nair

Member of the Kerala Legislative Assembly
- In office 1957–1965
- Preceded by: Constituency established
- Succeeded by: Constituency disestablished
- Constituency: Ramamangalam

Member of the Travancore Legislative Assembly
- In office 1948

Personal details
- Born: 2 October 1909 Ramamangalam, Travancore
- Died: 17 November 1983 (aged 74)
- Party: Indian National Congress

E. P. Poulose (Note: Also spelled Paulose.) (2 October 1909 – 17 November 1983) was an Indian lawyer and politician who served in the Kerala Legislative Assembly from 1957 until 1965, representing the Ramamangalam constituency. A member of the Indian National Congress, Poulose was the Minister for Food and Agriculture of Kerala from 1960 until 1964.

== Biography ==
E. P. Poulose was born on 2 October 1909 in the village of Ramamangalam, then part of the princely state of Travancore. In 1933, Poulose received a law degree and began working as a lawyer. A Syrian Christian, Poulose joined the Indian National Congress in 1935 and became a member of the Indian independence movement. Due to this affiliation, he was briefly imprisoned by British authorities in 1946. In 1948, Poulose was elected to the Travancore Legislative Assembly.

In the 1957 election, Poulose stood as a candidate in the newly-established Kerala Legislative Assembly, facing Communist Party of India candidate Parameswaran Nair in the Ramamangalam constituency. Poulose defeated Nair, receiving 20,086 votes compared to Nair's 13,588. In the 1960 Kerala Legislative Assembly election, Poulose defeated CPI candidate P. V. Abraham, receiving 32,448 votes to Abraham's 19,871. After winning re-election, Poulose was appointed Minister for Food and Agriculture in the government of Pattom A. Thanu Pillai, the chief minister of Kerala, on 22 February 1960. He was retained in the government of Pillai's successor, R. Sankar, after Pillai's resignation in 1962. Poulose served as minister until 10 September 1964. The following year, Poulose ran for re-election in the 1965 Kerala Legislative Assembly election, running in the Muvattupuzha constituency. Poulose was defeated by Kerala Congress candidate A. T. Pathrose, receiving 14,659 votes to Pathrose's 18,929.

During his tenure in the assembly, Poulose was an advocate for Christian traditions. In 1957, Poulose and other Christian MLAs led the opposition to the Kerala Education Act, a bill which proposed regulations on the educational system; the bill was strongly opposed by Christians in Kerala, as it would establish regulations on private Christian schools. The following year, Poulose opposed a bill which would repeal the 1916 Travancore Christian Succession Act, a law which codified the Christian dowry system, in which Christian women who received a dowry would forfeit all claims of inheritance to their family's property.

Poulose died on 17 November 1983.
