= Parli-II =

- village
- Location in Kerala, India Parli-II (India)
- Coordinates: 10.802809°N 76.558485°E
- Country: India
- State: Kerala
- District: Palakkad

Population (2011)
  - Total: 17,082

Languages
  - Official: Malayalam, English
- Time zone: UTC+5:30 (IST)
- PIN: 6XXXXX
- Vehicle registration: KL-

Parli-II is a village in Palakkad district in the state of Kerala, India. Parli-I and Parli-II come under the administration of the Parli gram panchayat.

== Demographics ==
As of 2011 India census, Parli-II had a population of 17,082 with 8,321 males and 8,761 females.
