= Prahladan Gopalan =

Indian politician

Member of the Kerala Legislative Assembly
- In office 1960–1965
- Preceded by: K. P. R. Gopalan
- Succeeded by: K. P. R. Gopalan
- Constituency: Madayi Assembly constituency

Personal details
- Born: Puthiyapurayil Gopalan; 1922 Malabar District, British India
- Died: 20 May 1969 (aged 46–47) Malappuram, Kerala, India
- Children: 5

Puthiyapurayil Gopalan popularly known as Prahladan Gopalan was an Indian National Congress politician from Kerala, India. He represented Madayi Assembly constituency in the second Kerala Legislative Assembly.

== Biography ==
Puthiyapurayil Gopalan was born on 1922, as one of the five children of R. Kunhiraman Master and P. Madhavi Amma, a Malabar District School Teacher. His father was a man who was widely criticized for the Dalit upliftment put forward by Mahatma Gandhi and had to accept humiliation even from his own community.

Gopalan became an untrained teacher in 1938 at the age of 16. At that time he participated in a teachers' strike against a meeting called Gurujan Sabha, which is compulsory every Saturday, conducted in RKUP school where his father was the manager. His father was in favor of the meeting. People started calling Gopalan along with the name of Prahlada in Hindu mythology after he succeeded in his struggle against his own father over the issue.

He died on May 20, 1969, at the age of 47 in a road accident in Malappuram.

== Career and activism ==
Gopalan was evicted from his home for protesting against his father and later moved to Bombay. While in Bombay he was attracted to Indian National Congress. He was appointed General Secretary of the Bombay Youth Congress and returned home in 1940 to form Youth Congress in his native place. He later took part in several freedom struggles, including the Quit India movement, and was imprisoned. He also fasted inside the jail in protest of being given unhygienic food in jail.

In the 1960 elections to the Second Kerala Legislative Assembly, Prahladan defeated K. P. R. Gopalan by 261 votes. In 1965, he again contested for the Third Kerala Legislative Assembly, but lost to K. P. R. Gopalan. He also served as the president of Kannur District Congress Committee.

== Controversies ==
On September 25, 1962, on his way to Peachy, P. T. Chacko MLA's official car was involved in an accident. The controversy was sparked when locals saw a woman in the car. Prahladan Gopalan went on a hunger strike in front of the Assembly on January 30, 1964, demanding the resignation of Chacko from his own party. Chacko was forced to resign on February 16, 1964.
