= A. T. Pathrose =

Indian politician (1932–2020)

- Born: 1932; Muvattupuzha, Kerala state, India
- Died: 16 May 2020 (aged 87–88)
- Education: Graduated in Law
- Known for: Being elected to Kerala Legislature, but being unable to take oath as the body was prematurely dissolved.

Anithottathil Thomman Pathrose (1932 – May 16, 2020) was an Indian politician who was elected in the 3rd Kerala Assembly elections in Kerala, India, but was unable to take oath. Although the 133 member assembly of that election was theoretically formed on 17 March 1965, it was prematurely dissolved on 24 March without the members being given an opportunity to take oath. Pathrose was never again elected to the Kerala Legislature.

He died on May 16, 2020.

== Life ==
He was born to Anithottathil Thomman and Vallamkulam Kandathil Maniyanottu Chinnamma in 1932 at Muvattupuzha, Kerala. He started practicing in the Kerala High Court in 1963 after obtaining degree in law from Calcutta. He stopped his practice to run a roof tile factory. In 1963, he was elected as a panchayat member.

He successfully contested the Muvattupuzha assembly constituency in 1965 on a Kerala Congress ticket. E.P. Paulose of Indian National Congress who was a minister earlier and M. Parameswaran Nair of Communist Party of India (CPI) were the opponents. Even though he contested in 1967 as well, he was defeated by P.V. Abraham of CPI.

He was a panchayath president for 18 years. He was also the chairman of Pambakkuda block development committee, Director of State General Marketing Society and Director of National Co-operative Union of India.
