= Parali =

Governing institution

Parali Grama panchayat is a gram panchayat in the Palakkad district, state of Kerala, India. It is a local government organization that serves the villages of Parli-I and Parli-II.
