= K. P. Rajendran =

Indian politician

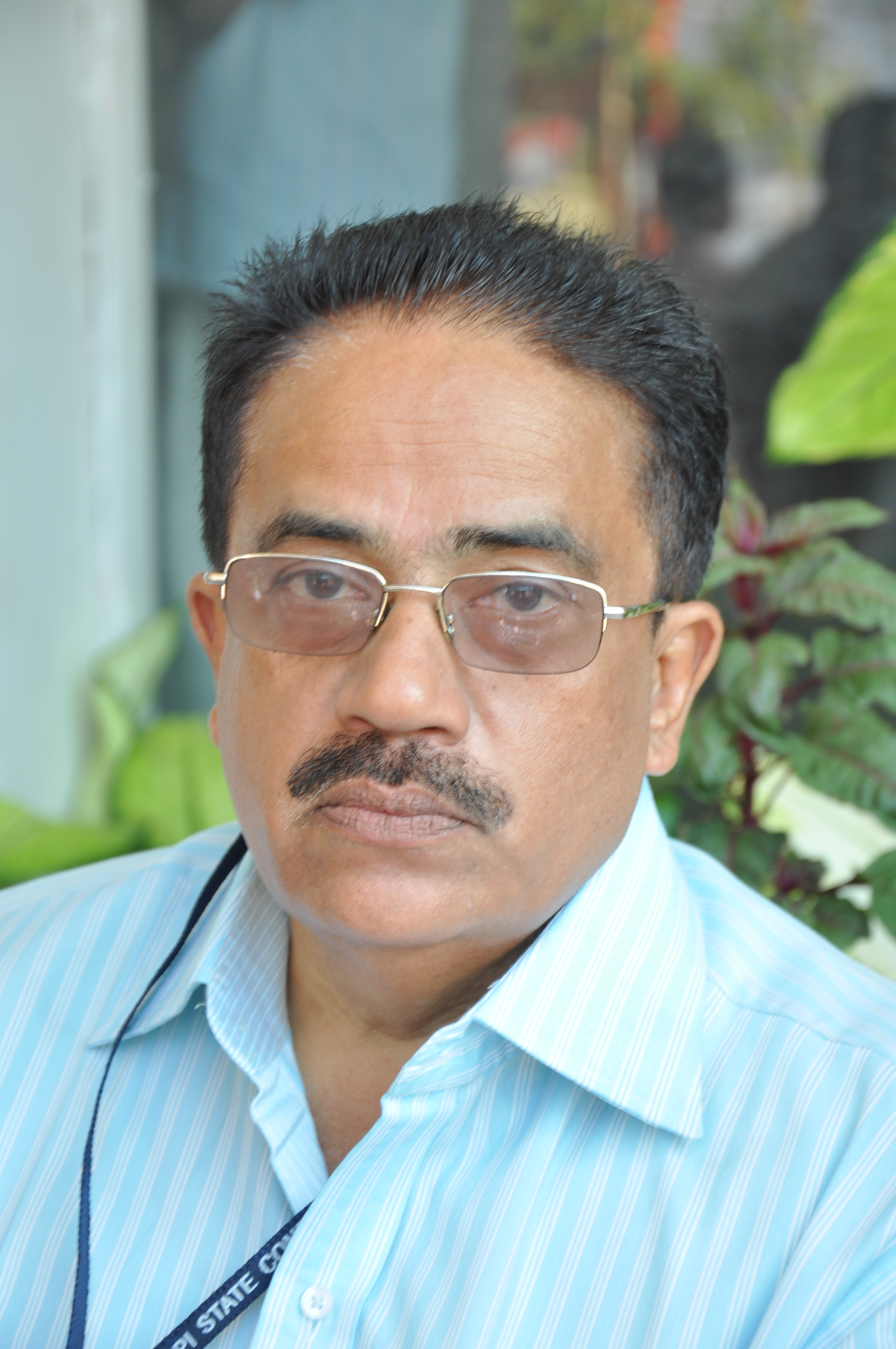

Minister for Revenue, Government of Kerala
- In office 2006–2011

Personal details
- Born: 3 November 1954 (age 71) Thrissur, Travancore-Cochin, India
- Party: Communist Party of India
- Spouse: Ani
- Children: 2 daughters.
- Parents: K. P. Prabhakaran (father); K.R. Karthiyani (mother)

K. P. Rajendran (born 3 November 1954) is an Indian politician, State Executive Member of Communist Party of India, and National Working Committee Member of All India Trade Union Congress (AITUC). He was the Minister for Revenue and Land Reforms in the Left Democratic Front government under V. S. Achuthanandan from 2006-2011. He represented the Kodungallur Assembly constituency in the 12th Kerala Assembly from 2006 to 2011.

== Career ==
Born on 3 November 1954 to K. P. Prabhakaran and K. R. Karthiyani at Thrissur in Kerala. He holds a B.A. degree and a LLB degree and was a trade union worker.

== See also ==
- Kerala Council of Ministers
