= O.T. Sarada Krishnan =

Indian politician

Member of Kerala Legislative Assembly
- In office 1957–1965
- Preceded by: Office established
- Succeeded by: P.C. Raghavan Nair
- Constituency: Kozhikode - 1 constituency

Personal details
- Born: 22 February 1905
- Died: 14 April 1973 (aged 68)

O.T. Sarada Krishnan was an Indian politician who served as Member of Kerala Legislative Assembly from Kozhikode - 1 constituency from 1960 to 1964.

== Personal life ==
She was born on 22 February 1905 and died on 14 April 1973.
