= Kerala Lokayukta =

Parliamentary ombudsman for Kerala, India

- കേരള ലോകായുക്ത
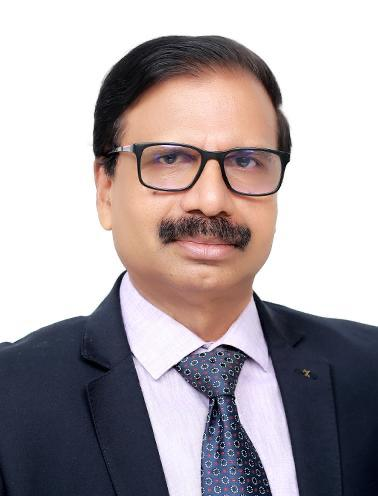
- Incumbent; Justice N. Anil Kumar
- Style: The Hon’ble
- Seat: Legislature Complex, Vikas bhavan, Thiruvananthapuram
- Appointer: Governor of Kerala
- Term length: 5 years
- Constituting instrument: Kerala Lokayukta Act, 1999
- Formation: 1999; 27 years ago
- First holder: Justice PC Balakrishna Menon
- Deputy: Upa Lokayukta
- Website: https://www.lokayuktakerala.gov.in

Kerala Lokayukta is the Parliamentary Ombudsman for the state of Kerala (India). It is a high level statutory functionary, created to address grievances of the public against ministers, legislators, administration and public servants in issues related to misuse of power, mal-administration and corruption. It was first formed under the Kerala Lokayukta and Upa-Lokayukta Act, and approved by the president of India on 4 March 1999. With The Lokpal and Lokayuktas Act, 2013 adopted by the Indian Parliament coming into force as a law on 16 January 2014, each state in India was required to appoint its Lokayukta within a year. A bench of Lokayukta should consist of judicial and non-judicial members. An Upa-Lokayukta is the deputy of the Lokayukta and assists with her or his work and acts as the in-charge Lokayukta in case the position falls vacant prematurely.

A Lokayukta of the state is appointed to office by the state Governor after consulting the committee consisting of State Chief minister, Speaker of Legislative Assembly, Leader of the Opposition, Chairman of Legislative Council and Leader of Opposition of Legislative Council and cannot be removed from office except for reasons specified in the Act and will serve the period of five years.

== History and administration ==
Kerala Lokayukta was formed on 15 November 1998 by the state Governor after the bill was signed by President of India. It resolved 34,662 cases out of 35,986 cases filed before it from the date of its formation. Every year 15 November is observed as Lokayukta Day in state. Till 2019 around 1320 cases were pending before it.

== Oath or affirmation ==
"I, <name>, having been appointed Lokayukta (or Upa-Lokayukta) do swear in the name of God (or solemnly affirm) that I will bear faith and allegiance to the Constitution of India as by law established and I will duly and faithfully and to the best of my ability, knowledge and judgment perform the duties of my office without fear or favour, affection or ill-will."

— First Schedule, Kerala Lokayukta and Upa-Lokayuktas Act, 1999

== Powers ==
Kerala Lokayukta Act makes provision for the appointment of Lokayukta and authorities with certain functions with powers to enquire into complaints or other allegations against any officials mentioned in the Act for their actions mentioned in the Act. Kerala Lokayukta can only make recommendations to competent authority but can't enforce the punishment.

== Appointment and tenure ==
Following is the list of Lokayuktas along with their tenure-

Index	Name	Holding charge from	Holding charge to
1	Mr. Justice P.C. Balakrishna Menon	24.12.1998	23.12.2003
2	Mr. Justice K. Sreedharan	22.01.2004	22.01.2009
3	Mr. Justice. M.M. Pareed Pillay	31.01.2009	31.01.2014
4	Justice Pius C. Kuriakose	09.02.2014	08.02.2019
5	Justice Cyriac Joseph	28.03.2019	26.03.2024
6	Justice N. Anil Kumar	21.08.2024	

== Notable cases ==
Kerala Lokayukta had issued the following important orders

1. Kerala Lokayukta had issued notices to Chief Minister and some of his ministers in year 2019 on a complaint filed alleging misuse of funds from Chief Minister's Distress Relief Fund.

2. Complaint was filed in Lokayukta in the year 2021 against serving Minister for Forests AK Saseendran relating to the case of assault and abuse of power.

3. Kerala Lokayukta recommended action against the serving Higher Education and Minority Welfare Minister K T Jaleel for appointing his second cousin K T Adeeb to Kerala State Minorities Development Finance Corporation as General Manager after modifying the eligibility for the post and abusing the power of a Minister.

4. In year 2011, Kerala Lokayukta had issued orders for the appearance of serving Chief Minister VS Achuthanandan`s son in an allegation related to bribery by opposition party.

== Related articles ==
- The Lokpal and Lokayuktas Act, 2013

== See also ==
- Kerala Vigilance & Anti-Corruption Bureau
- Lokpal
