= Fathima Beevi =

Indian judge (1927–2023)

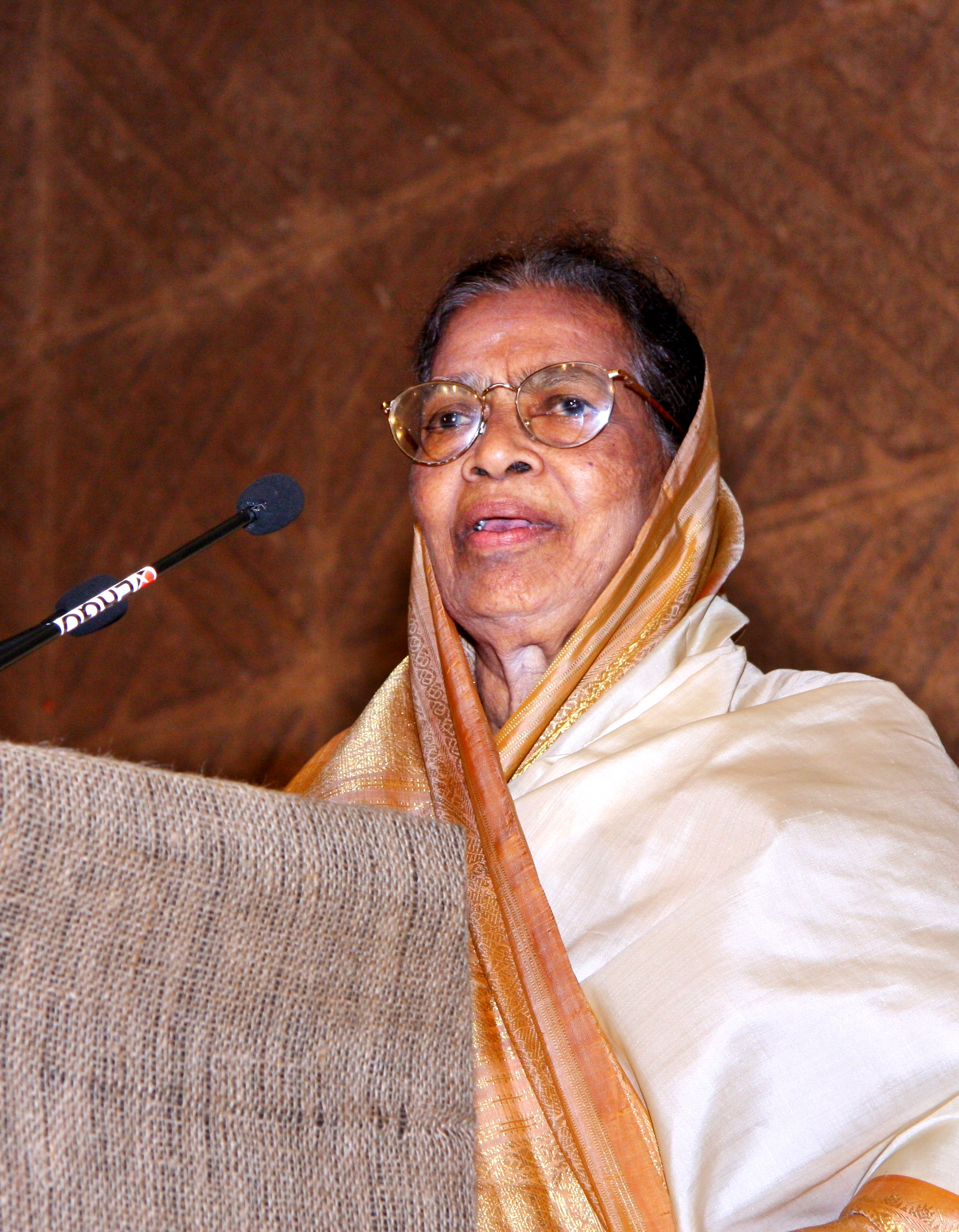

11th Governor of Tamil Nadu
- In office 25 January 1997 – 3 July 2001
- Chief Minister: M. Karunanidhi; J. Jayalalithaa
- Preceded by: Krishan Kant (Additional Charge)
- Succeeded by: C. Rangarajan (Additional Charge)

Member of National Human Rights Commission of India
- In office 1993–1997

Judge of the Supreme Court of India
- In office 6 October 1989 – 29 April 1992
- Nominated by: E. S. Venkataramiah
- Appointed by: R. Venkataraman

Personal details
- Born: 30 April 1927 Pathanamthitta, Travancore, India (present day Kerala, India)
- Died: 23 November 2023 (aged 96) Pathanamthitta, Kerala, India
- Education: Government Law College, Thiruvananthapuram; University College Thiruvananthapuram

M. Fathima Beevi (30 April 1927 – 23 November 2023) was an Indian judge who was a justice of the Supreme Court of India. Appointed to the apex Court in 1989, she became the first female judge of the Supreme Court of India, and the first Muslim woman to be appointed to any of the higher judiciaries in the country. On her retirement from the court, she served as a member of the National Human Rights Commission and later as the Governor of the Indian state of Tamil Nadu from 1997 to 2001. In 2023, she was honoured with Kerala Prabha Award, the second-highest honour given by the Government of Kerala. In the 2024 honours list, she was posthumously awarded the Padma Bhushan.

== Early life and education ==
M. Fathima Beevi was born on 30 April 1927 at Pathanamthitta in the Kingdom of Travancore, now in the Indian state of Kerala, as the daughter of Annaveettil Meer Sahib and Khadeeja Beevi into the Rowther family.

Beevi attended Town school and Catholicate High School, Pathanamthitta and got her BSc in chemistry from Government College for Women, Thiruvananthapuram. She obtained her LL.B. from Government Law College, Thiruvananthapuram.

== Career ==
Beevi was enrolled as Advocate on 14 November 1950. She topped the Bar Council exam in 1950. She began her career in the lower judiciary in Kerala. She was appointed the Munsiff in the Kerala Sub-ordinate Judicial Services in May 1958. She was promoted as the Sub-ordinate Judge in 1968 and as the Chief Judicial Magistrate in 1972, as District & Sessions Judge in 1974.

In January 1980, Beevi was appointed the Judicial Member of the Income Tax Appellate Tribunal. She was then elevated to the High Court as a Judge on 4 August 1983.

Beevi became permanent Judge of the High Court on 14 May 1984. She retired as the Judge of the High Court on 29 April 1989 but was further elevated to the Supreme Court as a Judge on 6 October 1989 where she retired on 29 April 1992.

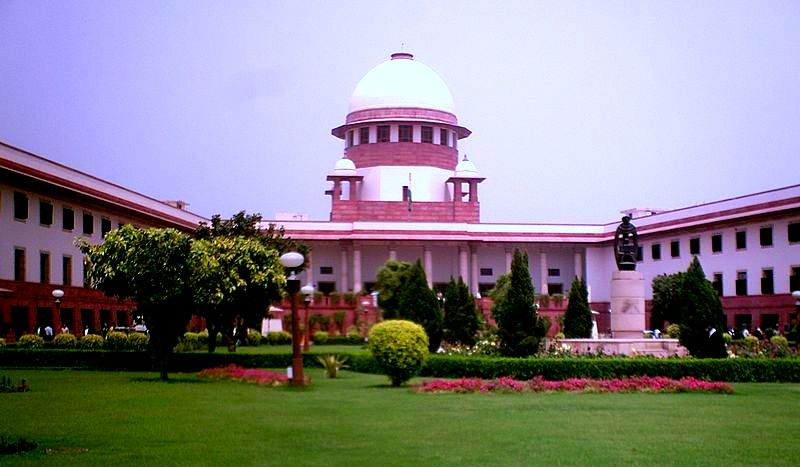
Supreme Court of India

== Governor of Tamil Nadu ==
Beevi later went on to become the Governor of Tamil Nadu on 25 January 1997. Appointing her as the Governor of Tamil Nadu and Justice Sukhdev Singh Kang, former Chief Justice of Jammu and Kashmir High Court, as Governor of Kerala, the then President of India, Shankar Dayal Sharma said "Their experience of and insights into the working of the Constitution and the laws comprise valuable assets."

As the Governor of the state, she rejected the mercy petitions filed by the four condemned prisoners in the Rajiv Gandhi assassination case. The prisoners had sent the mercy petitions to the Governor, pleading for her to exercise her power under Article 161 of the Constitution (the Governor's power to grant pardon).

=== Controversy ===
Beevi was embroiled in controversy when she gave a clean chit to the law and order situation in Tamil Nadu that prompted the ire of the Central government. The Minister for Law, Arun Jaitley asked for her resignation. Later she left her office as Governor of the state under controversial circumstances of her accepting Jayalalithaa's assembly majority after the elections and over the arrest of Karunanidhi, who pitched for her appointment four years ago. Jayalalitha defended the state Governor's decision to invite her to form the government. She said "She is a former supreme court judge. She herself is a legal expert. Nobody need teach her about law or the constitution. Her decision is not justiciable." Jayalalitha's party had received the simple majority (131 seats out of total 234 seats in the Tamil Nadu Assembly) after elections in May 2001. Fathima Beevi, the then Governor of Tamil Nadu administered the oath of office to J Jayalalitha as the Chief Minister of Tamil Nadu on 14 May 2001 in spite of the fact that Jayalalitha could not contest the election and would not be able to get herself elected by the people to the assembly within six months as per the constitution. There were a few Public Interest Litigations (PIL) filed in the Supreme Court questioning the validity of her appointment as the Chief Minister of Tamil Nadu. Fathima Beevi justified her decision by saying that the majority party in the state assembly had elected Jayalalitha as their leader.

Fathima Beevi submitted her resignation after the Union Cabinet decided to recommend to the President to recall the Governor for having failed to discharge her constitutional obligation. The centre was peeved with Fathima Beevi for not having furnished an independent and objective assessment of the sequence of events after the arrest of the former Chief Minister, M. Karunanidhi, and the two Union Ministers, Murasoli Maran and T. R. Baalu. The centre had accused her of toeing the official line verbatim. The then Andhra Pradesh Governor, Dr C. Rangarajan, took charge as the acting Governor of Tamil Nadu, following her resignation.

Subsequently, the Supreme Court of India overturned her appointment of Jayalalithaa as Chief Minister of Tamil Nadu. Referring to the case, the Court Bench ruled that "The Governor cannot, in the exercise of his/her discretion or otherwise, do anything that is contrary to the Constitution and the laws. Therefore, the Governor, having due regard to the Constitution and the laws, must decline to exercise the discretion in appointing as Chief Minister a non-member who was not qualified to become a member of the legislature."

=== Other duties ===
As the Governor of the state she had also served as the Chancellor of Madras University. It was reported by university sources that the Vice-Chancellor, P. T. Manoharan, had decided to quit his office in the wake of the Chancellor allegedly withholding her approval to the Syndicate's decision to establish a new department for contemporary Tamil literature. She had also served as the Chairman of Kerala Commission for Backward Classes (1993) and member of National Human Rights Commission (1993). She received Hon. D. Litt. and Mahila Shiromani Award in 1990. She was also awarded Bharat Jyoti Award.

The left parties also discussed the nomination of the prospects of Fathima Beevi as the President of India, during which the NDA Government proposed the name of Dr. A P J Abdul Kalam.

== Death ==
Fathima Beevi died on 23 November 2023, at the age of 96.

== See also ==
- Anna Chandy
