= Hridayakumari =

Indian writer, educator, and translator

- Born: Hridayakumari; 1930; Aranmula (present Kerala), India
- Died: 8 November 2014 (aged 83–84)
- Occupations: Writer; educator; translator
- Parent: Bodheswaran (father)
- Writing career
- Language: Malayalam
- Notable work: Kalpanikatha
- Notable awards: Kerala Sahitya Akademi Award

Hridayakumari (1930 – 8 November 2014) was an Indian writer, educator, scholar, translator, and orator. She wrote primarily in the Malayalam language, and in 1991, was awarded the Kerala Sahitya Academy Award for her book, Kalpanikatha.

== Career ==
Hridayakumari taught English at several colleges in the state of Kerala during a forty-year career, eventually retiring as the principal of Government College for Women in Thiruvananthapuram in 1986. She had also taught previously at the University College, Thiruvananthapuram; at Maharajas College, Ernakulam;at Brennen College, Thalassery and Victoria College, Palakkad. She won several awards, including the S Guptan Nair award, the Captain Lakshmi Award, and the Shankaranarayanan Thampi award.

Following her retirement, Hridayakumari gave public lectures on literature, poetry, and philosophy. She also and served on several government committees that dealt with educational reforms in Kerala, and was the chair of a committee that was created by the Kerala State Higher Education Council to reform college credits and semester structures.

She also wrote two books. Kalpanikatha is a study of romanticism in literature, comparing English and Malayalam poets, such as William Wordsworth, John Keats, Percy Bysshe Shelley, and Kumaranasan, Changampuzha Krishna Pillai and Edappally Raghavan Pillai. In 1991, Kalpanikatha won the Kerala Sahitya Akademi Award. She later published an autobiography, Ormakalile Vasanthakalam, which detailed her experiences as a teacher.

Hridayakumari translated several works between Malayalam and English, including her sister, poet Sugathakumari's poetry, as well as works by Vallathol Narayana Menon (from Malayalam to English) and by Rabindranath Tagore (from English to Malayalam). Hridayakumari also translated Rathrimazha, a Sahitya-Akademi award-winning novel by Sugathakumari, from Malayalam to English.

== Personal life ==
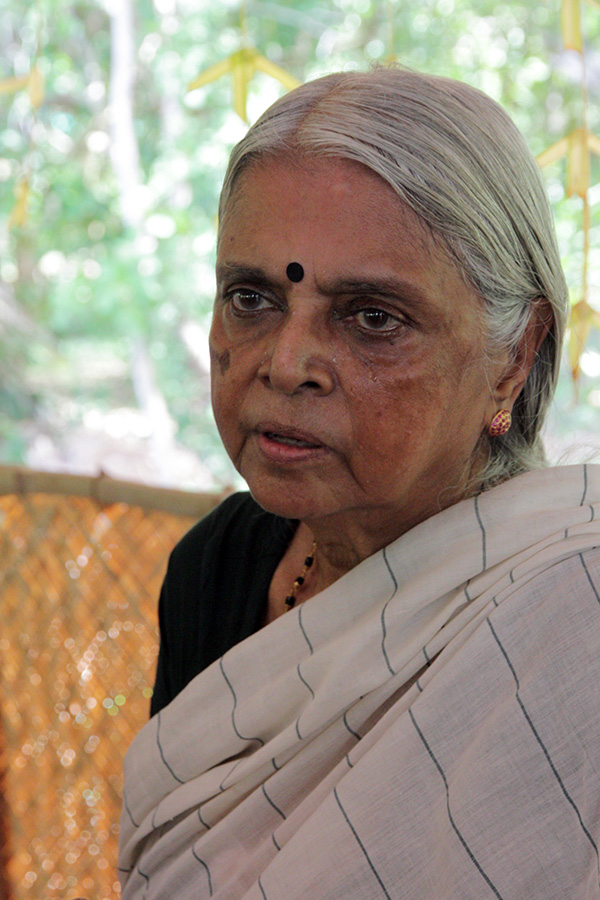
Sugathakumari

Hridayakumari was born to V. K. Karthyayani, a professor and scholar of Sanskrit, and Bodheswaran, a poet and Indian freedom fighter, in 1930, in Aranmula. Her sisters, Sugathakumari and Sujatha Devi were also writers and social activists. Her daughter, Sreedevi Pillai, is a journalist. She died at the age of 84 on 8 November 2014.
