= P. Krishna Kumar (judge) =

The Honourable Justice P. Krishna Kumar

Judge of the Kerala High Court
- Incumbent
- Assumed office 30 October 2024
- Nominated by: D. Y. Chandrachud
- Appointed by: Droupadi Murmu

Personal details
- Pronunciation: P. Krishna Kumar പി. കൃഷ്ണകുമാർ
- Born: 25 May 1975 (age 51) Kerala
- Spouse: Salini N.
- Education: GLC Thiruvananthapuram
- Website: High Court of Kerala

Parameswara Panicker Krishna Kumar is an Indian judge who is presently serving as a judge of Kerala High Court. The High Court of Kerala is the highest court in the Indian state of Kerala and in the Union Territory of Lakshadweep. The High Court of Kerala is headquartered at Ernakulam, Kochi.

== Early life and education ==
Krishna Kumar obtained Law Degree from Government Law College, Thiruvananthapuram.

== Career ==
Krishna Kumar enrolled as an advocate and started practice. He was directly recruited from bar as district and sessions judge in 2012. Served as Additional district and sessions judge, Kollam and Thiruvananthapuram, Local Self Government Tribunal, Thiruvananthapuram, special judge, CBI/NIA Court, Ernakulam and registrar (district judiciary) and registrar general of the High Court of Kerala. In 2017 he represented India in the International Judicial Conference held at the University of California, Berkeley, San Francisco, US. He was elevated as additional judge of High Court of Kerala on 30 October 2024 and became permanent judge from 5 October 2026.
