= T. V. Anilkumar =

Indian judge

Hon'ble Justice T. V. Anilkumar

Judge of Kerala High Court
- In office 5 November 2018 – 24 May 2021

Personal details
- Born: 25 May 1959 (age 67) Valiyavila, Thiruvananthapuram Taluk |Thiruvananthapuram District, Kerala
- Citizenship: Indian
- Education: Government Law College, Thiruvananthapuram
- Website: High Court of Kerala

T. V. Anilkumar is a retired judge of the Kerala High Court, the highest court in the Indian state of Kerala and in the Union Territory of Lakshadweep with its headquarters in Ernakulam, Kochi.

== Early life and education ==
Anilkumar was born on 25 May 1959 at Valiyavila, Thiruvavanthapuram Taluk, Thiruvananthapuram District, Kerala. He obtained a law degree from the Government Law College, Thiruvananthapuram.

== Career ==
Anilkumar joined the Kerala Judicial Service on 28 January 1991 as a munsiff in Kottarakkara. He was subsequently a judicial first class magistrate in Kattakkada, Kayamkulam and Kollam, a sub-judge in Kattappana, chief judicial magistrate in Kottayam, additional district and sessions judge in Kollam, judge at the Wakf Tribunal in Kollam, additional district and sessions judge in Alappuzha, judge in the Family Court in Alappuzha, registrar in the Kerala Administrative Tribunal in Thiruvananthapuram, judge in the Motor Accidents Claims Tribunal in Pathanamthitta, district judge in Palakkad and director of the Kerala Judicial Academy in Athani. On 5 November 2018, he was appointed an additional judge of the High Court of Kerala. Justice Anilkumar demitted his office upon attaining the age of superannuation on 24 May 2021.
