= Karunakaran Babu =

Indian judge

Honourable Justice K. Babu
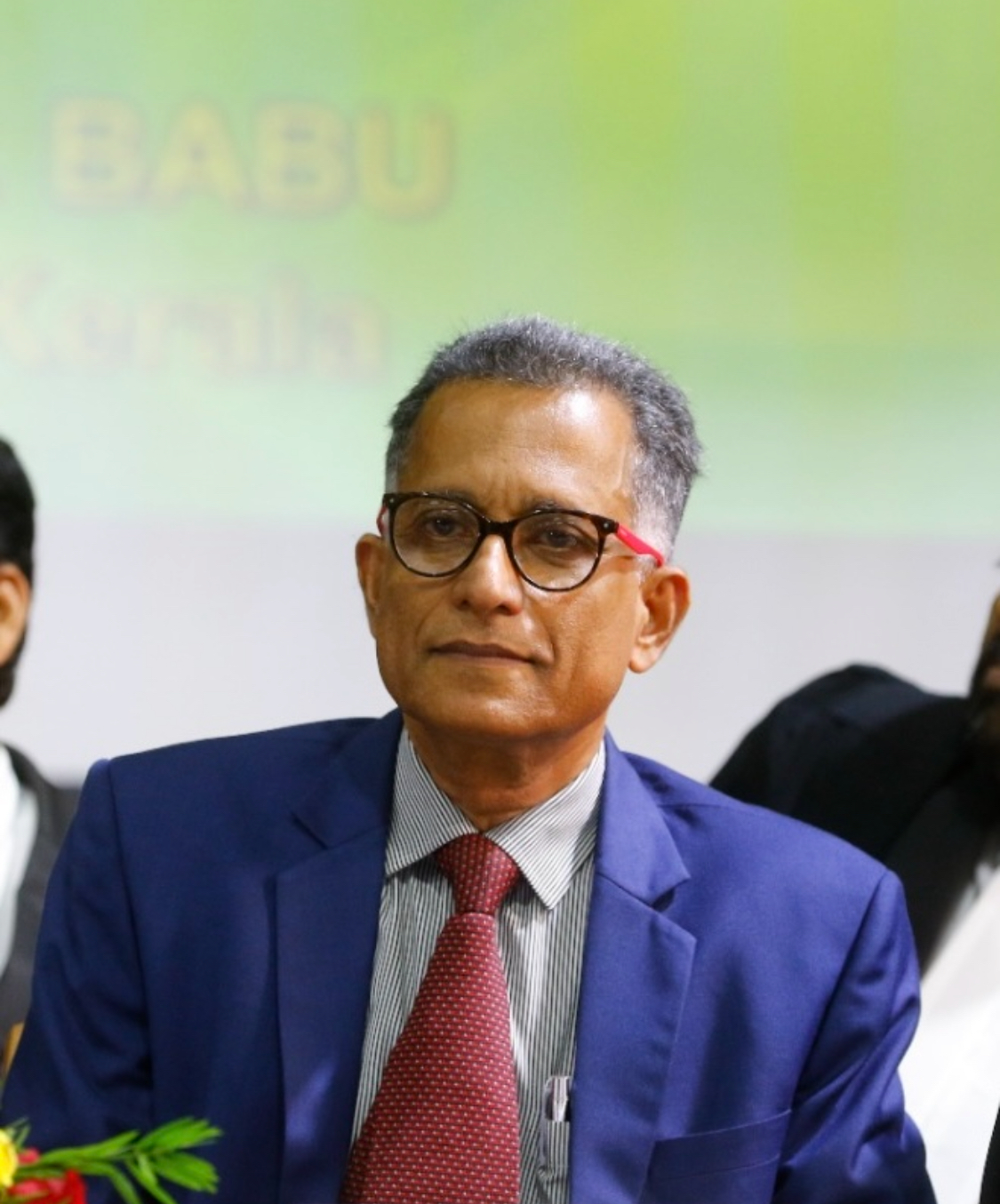

Judge of the Kerala High Court
- Nominated by: Sharad Arvind Bobde
- Appointed by: Ram Nath Kovind
- Prime Minister: Narendra Modi

District Judge
- In office 2009–2021`
- Appointed by: R. S. Gavai

Personal details
- Pronunciation: Karunakaran Babu करुणाकरन बाबू കരുണാകരൻ ബാബു
- Born: 8 May 1964 (age 62) Ayoor, Kollam
- Spouse: Sandhya Babu
- Children: Vrinda Babu (daughter); Varun Babu (son)
- Parents: Karunakaran (father); Bhavani (mother)
- Education: Master of Laws, Master of Economics
- Alma mater: Government High School, Thevannoor. Government Law College, Thiruvananthapuram. Mahatma Gandhi University, Kerala
- Website: High Court of Kerala

Karunakaran Babu (born 8 May 1964), often referred to as K. Babu, is an Indian judge who is presently serving as a judge of the Kerala High Court. The High Court of Kerala, headquartered at Ernakulam, Kochi, is the highest court in the Indian state of Kerala and in the Union Territory of Lakshadweep. Previously he also served as the Administrative Judge for the Union Territory of Lakshadweep, overseeing its judicial administration. Prior to his elevation to the High Court, he served as the District and Sessions Judge, Thiruvananthapuram.

== Early life and education ==
K. Babu was born to Karunakaran and Bhavani, who were engaged in agriculture. Babu attended Government High School, Thevannoor, mastered in Economics from University of Kerala, obtained a law degree from Government Law College, Thiruvananthapuram, and an LLM Degree from the Mahatma Gandhi University, Kerala.

== Personal life ==
Babu is married to Sandhya, who is a former school teacher. Their son, Varun Babu, (born August 25, 2004) is currently pursuing legal studies at Christ University, Delhi NCR. On 6 April 2026, Varun Babu received the Best Paper Award and the Best Presenter Award at the 1st International Labour Law Conference on New Labour Codes hosted by Maharashtra National Law University, Mumbai.

His daughter, Vrinda Babu, completed her Master of Laws degree from Cochin University of Science and Technology and is practicing as a lawyer.

== Career ==
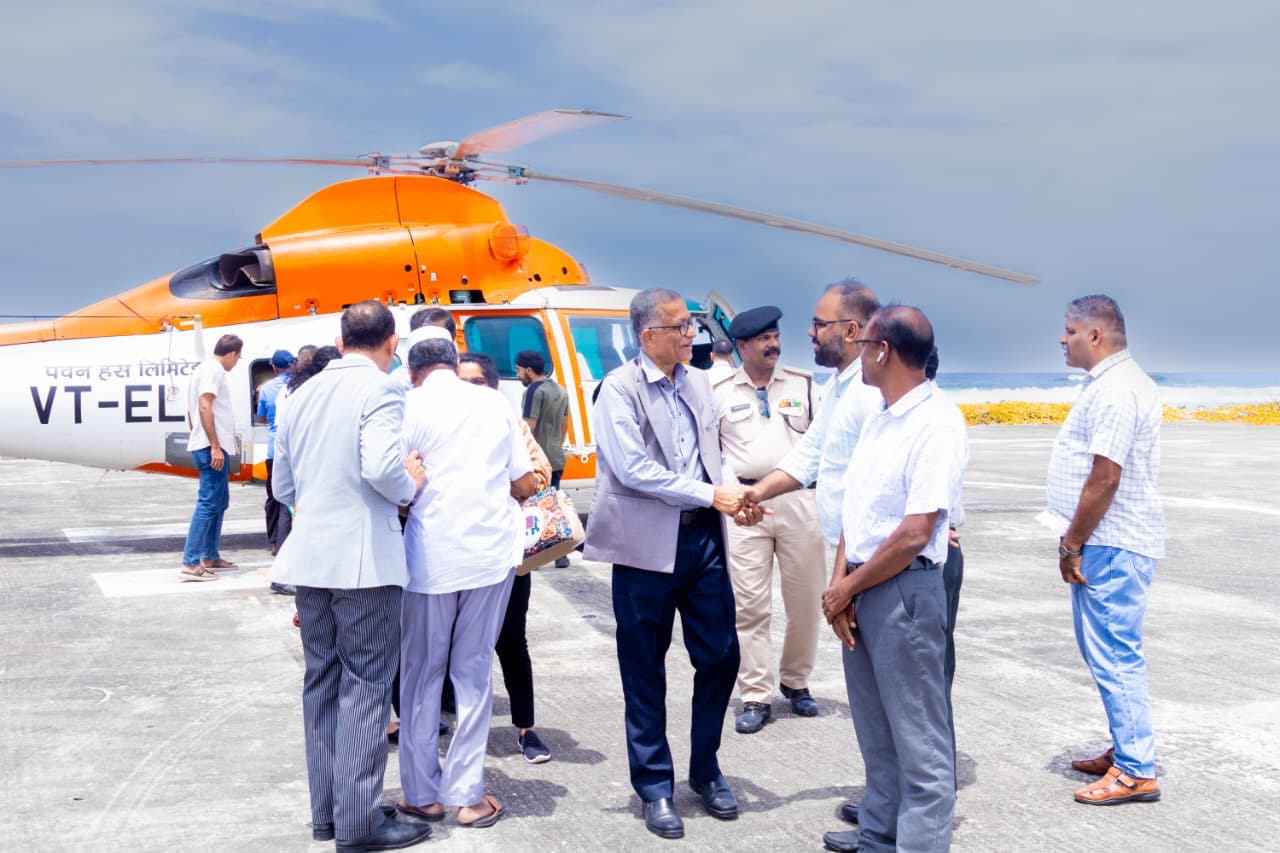
Visiting union territory of Lakshadweep in 2024.

Babu enrolled as an advocate on March 20, 1994, and began his legal practice in Kottarakkara and Kollam, specializing primarily in Civil law, Family law and Criminal law while handling various other branches of law. In 2009, he secured the 1st rank in the Kerala Higher Judicial Service examination and joined as a District & Sessions Judge. Over the years, he served in multiple key judicial and administrative roles, including:

- Additional District Judge at Thalassery, Pathanamthitta, and Kottayam
- Special Judge (SPE/CBI) at Kochi
- Special Commissioner, Sabarimala Temple (Additional Charge)
- Registrar (Subordinate Judiciary) in the Kerala High Court
- Registrar (Officer on Special Duty) in the Supreme Court of India
- Principal District Judge, Thiruvananthapuram
- Chairman of the Supreme Court-appointed Committee for the Padmanabhaswamy Temple(Additional Charge)

While serving as Principal District Judge, Thiruvananthapuram, he was elevated as an Additional Judge of the High Court on February 25, 2021, and became a permanent judge on June 6, 2022.

== Notable rulings ==
=== Case against Kerala MLA Rahul Mamkootathil ===
When Kerala MLA Rahul Mamkootathil's anticipatory bail plea came up for hearing, Justice Babu said the matter would be posted for a detailed hearing. “During the pendency of the case, I will not permit the police to arrest the petitioner because he has raised serious contentions,” the court observed. “No man shall be condemned unless heard. When a matter is pending before a constitutional court, he will not be arrested. The petitioner's case is that it was a consensual relationship. And admittedly, there is a consensual relationship,” Justice Babu added.

=== Jomon Puthenpurackal v State of Kerala ===
The Kerala High Court on Friday (11 April) ordered CBI enquiry into former Chief Secretary of Kerala K. M. Abraham in a case of illegal amassment of wealth. The order was passed by Justice Babu in a petition filed by Jomon Puthenpurackal, a popular activist. It is alleged that while serving as the Additional Chief Secretary of Financial Department, Abraham acquired wealth disproportionate to his income.

=== Actor assault case ===
In the Dileep case, Justice Babu issued a directive for the Ernakulam District and Sessions Judge to provide copies of statements made during the fact-finding inquiry to the survivor. This directive came in response to a plea filed by the survivor alleging unauthorized access to a memory card containing visuals of the alleged assault. The court also ordered the sessions judge to conduct an inquiry into the alleged unauthorized access and leakage of the memory card's contents.

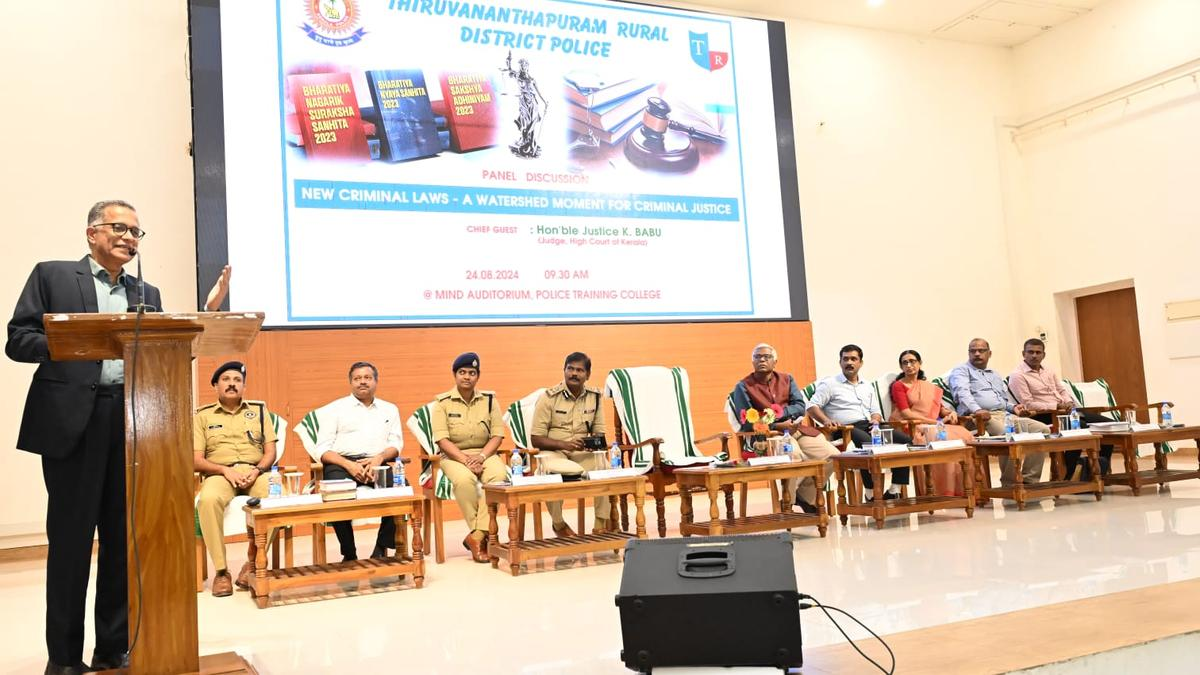
Inaugurating a panel discussion on the new criminal laws in Thiruvananthapuram.

=== Challenge to the Lok Ayukta Report by Former Minister K. T. Jaleel ===
The Kerala High Court on Tuesday dismissed the writ petition filed by former Minister for Higher Education and Minority Welfare K. T. Jaleel, challenging a report of the Kerala Lok Ayukta which had found him guilty of nepotism and favouritism. A division bench comprising Justice P. B. Suresh Kumar and Justice Babu affirmed the Lok Ayukta report, stating that Jaleel had not made out any ground.

=== Case against Actor Unni Mukundan ===
The Kerala High Court on Thursday stayed all further proceedings in a criminal case registered against actor Unni Mukundan for outraging the modesty of a woman script writer. Justice Babu passed the stay order on a petition filed by the actor seeking to quash the case.

=== Interpretation of the Doctrine of Res Ipsa Loquitur in Criminal Proceedings ===
The Kerala High Court (on January 8) observed that the principle of res ipsa loquitur (accident speaks for itself) can be extended to criminal cases, only as an aid for assessment of evidence. The maxim does not embody any rule of substantive law nor a rule of evidence, said the Court. The Bench of Justice Babu observed thus while acquitting an accused, convicted of rash and negligent.

=== Prosecution of Police Personnel for Alleged Acts of Torture Without Prior Sanction ===
The Kerala High Court has held that a Magistrate Court can take cognizance in case of custodial torture by police office, without prior sanction of the State Government under Section 197(1) of CrPC. Justice Babu reasoned that a Police Officer torturing a man in a police station cannot be treated as part of official duty, thus not requiring sanction to prosecute.
