= P. Somarajan =

Judge of Kerala High court

Hon'ble Justice P. Somarajan

Judge, Kerala High Court
- Incumbent
- Assumed office 5 October 2016
- Nominated by: T. S. Thakur
- Appointed by: Pranab Mukherjee

Personal details
- Born: 14 July 1962 (age 64) Kollam, Kerala
- Citizenship: Indian
- Spouse: Santhakumari
- Education: Government Law College, Thiruvananthapuram

P. Somarajan (born 14 July 1962) is a judge of Kerala High Court, the highest court in the Indian state of Kerala and in the Union Territory of Lakshadweep.

== Early life and education ==
Somarajan was born at Kollam, Kerala. He completed his schooling from PKPM NSS U.P School, Madannada, Kollam and VVHS School, Ayathil, Kollam. He graduated from Sree Narayana College, Kollam and obtained a law degree from Government Law College, Thiruvananthapuram.

== Career ==
Somarajan enrolled as an Advocate in 1988. He joined Kerala Judicial Service 2001 as District and Sessions Judge and served as Additional District Judge, Palakkad, Additional District & Sessions Judge & MACT, North Paravur, and Additional District & Sessions Judge, Thiruvananthapuram. He was promoted as grade District & Sessions Judge in 2009 and served as Enquiry Commissioner & Special Judge, Kottayam. Thereafter he was promoted as Super Time District Judge in 2013 and served as District & Sessions Judge at Alappuzha and Pathanamthitta. On 5 October 2016 he was appointed as additional judge of Kerala High Court and became permanent from 16 March 2018.
