= Anna Chandy =

Indian judge (1905–1996)

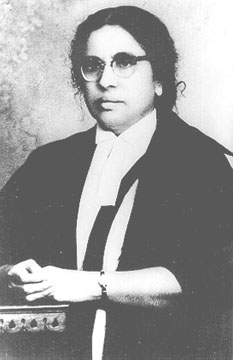
- Justice Anna Chandy
- Born: Anna; 5 April 1905; Trivandrum, Travancore
- Died: 20 July 1996 (aged 91); Kerala, India
- Education: Government College for Women, Thiruvananthapuram; Government Law College, Thiruvananthapuram
- Occupation: Judge
- Employer: Kerala High Court
- Known for: First woman Judge of India, First woman Judge in commonwealth countries
- Title: Hon. Justice
- Term: 9 February 1959 to 5 April 1967

Justice Anna Chandy (1905–1996), also known as Anna Chandi, was the first female judge (1937) and then High Court judge (1959) in India. She was one of the first female judges in the British Empire.

== Life ==
Anna Chandy was born in 1905, in the erstwhile kingdom of Travancore and raised in Trivandrum. She was an Anglican Syrian Christian who embraced Catholicism, in later life.

After obtaining a post-graduate degree from Government Law College, Thiruvananthapuram in 1926, she became the first woman in her state to get a law degree. She was called to the bar and practiced as a barrister from 1929 onwards. In 1931–32, she contested elections to the legislative assembly of Travancore princely state and was elected; she served as a legislator during the period 1932–34. Anna Chandy was the first woman to be a High Court judge in India and one of the first in the whole British Empire to attain this position. Her appointment in 1959 made news in legal circles in the UK, Canada, and other Commonwealth countries, drawing interest from around the world. Legal historians often compare her to Emily Murphy of Canada, who was one of the first female magistrates in the globe. This shows how important she is in pushing for women's participation in the law around the world.

In 1937, Chandy was appointed as a munsif in Travancore by the Maharaja upon the advice of his Dewan (First Minister), Sir C.P. Ramaswami Iyer. This made Chandy the first female judge in India. In 1948, she was raised to the position of District Judge. She became the first female judge in an Indian high court on her appointment to the Kerala High Court on 9 February 1959. She remained in that office until her retirement on 5 April 1967. In her retirement, Chandy served on the Law Commission of India and also wrote an autobiography titled Atmakatha (1973). She died in 1996.

Throughout her career as a lawyer, politician, and judge, Chandy promoted the cause of women's rights, most notably through a woman's magazine that she founded and edited. Often described as a "first-generation feminist", Chandy campaigned for election to the Shree Mulam Popular Assembly in 1931. She met with hostility from both her competition and newspapers but was elected for the period 1932–34.

Early legal career:

In 1929, Chandy was called to the bar and began working in the Kottayam District Court. She learned under John Nidhiry, a well-known lawyer of the period. In her memoirs, she wrote that her male coworkers and court officials often doubted her and were openly hostile to her, saying she would fail. Even so, she became known for being honest and good at her job, especially in criminal law.

Political career:

Anna Chandy ran for a seat in the Shri Mulam Popular Assembly in 1931. She was the target of vicious smear campaigns, and her opponents said that a woman getting involved in politics would be damaging for women's morals. Even though many didn't like her, she was elected and served from 1932 to 1934. During that time, she fought for women's education, social change, minimum pay for farm laborers, and the rights of widows. She is known for being one of the first people in India to call for full gender equality, even going so far as to challenge the fact that women were not subject to the death penalty to prove that everyone is equal under the law.

== See also ==
- First women lawyers around the world
