= K. M. Seethi Sahib =

Indian politician and intellectual

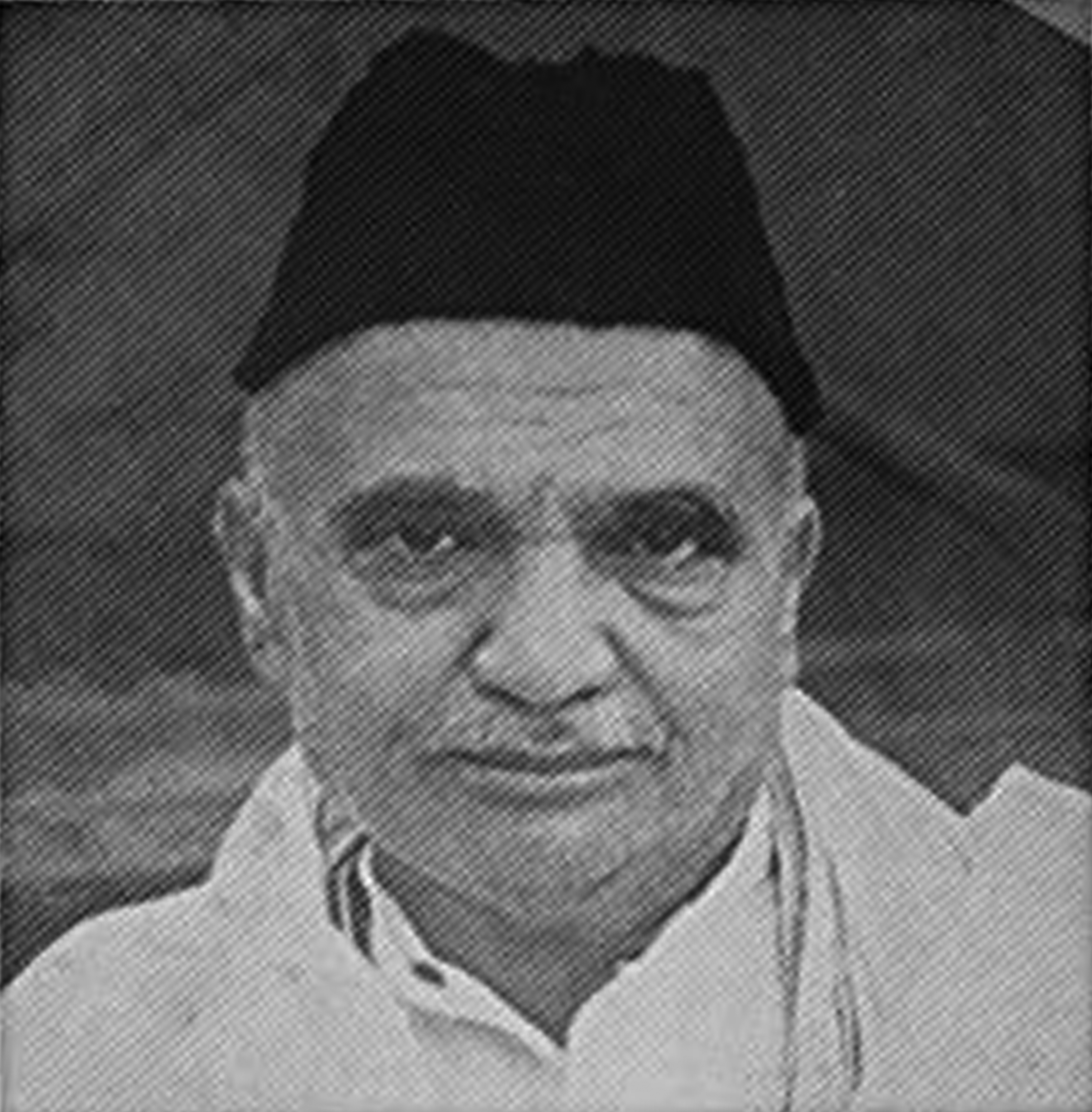
- K. M. Seethi Sahib

Speaker of Kerala Legislative Assembly
- In office 22 February 1960 – 17 April 1961
- Governor: V. V. Giri
- Deputy: A. Nafeesath Beevi
- Chief Minister: Pattom Thanu Pillai
- Preceded by: Sankara Narayanan Thampi
- Succeeded by: C. H. Mohammed Koya

Personal details
- Born: 1899 Kodungallur (Cochin) British India
- Died: 17 April 1961 (aged 61–62) Thiruvananthapuram (Kerala)
- Party: Indian National Congress (till 1933); All-India Muslim League (till 1947); Indian Union Muslim League
- Spouse: Khadija
- Parents: Seethi Mohammed; A.K. Fatima Beevi

K. M. Seethi Sahib (1899—1961), born K. M. Seethi, was an Indian politician and community leader from Kerala. He served as the Speaker of Kerala Assembly during 1960-61 (Pattom A. Thanu Pillai Ministry).

Seethi Sahib, born in 1899 in an affluent family in Kodungallur in the Cochin state, enrolled as an Advocate in Madras High Court in 1927 and started practice in Cochin. He started his political career with the Indian National Congress. He was elected to the Cochin Council twice (1928 and 1931) as a Congress member. During the mid-1930s when the All-India Muslim League ceased to cooperate with the Congress, Seethi Sahib and colleagues started organising the Muslim League in Malabar District.

Seethi Sahib was the Secretary of the Indian Union Muslim League during the 1957 General Elections in India. After the Kerala Assembly Election victory against the Communist Party in 1960, Seethi Sahib was elected as the Speaker of the Kerala Assembly. He died while in office on 17 April 1961. C. H. Muhammed Koya succeeded Seethi Sahib as the Speaker of the Kerala Assembly.

Seethi Sahib is often considered as "the chief architect of Mappila revival" after the 1921 Mappila Uprising. He was described by historian Robin Jeffrey as "the leading Mappila intellectual of the generation". Seethi Sahib was originally inspired by the reformist leader Wakkom Maulavi (1873—1932).

== Life and career ==
=== Early life ===
K. M. Seethi was born in 1899 as the son of Haji Seethi Mohammed and P. K. Fatima Beevi in an affluent family in Kodungallur (Cochin) in central Kerala. He did his schooling at Kodungallur High School and completed the Intermediate Course from Maharaja's College, Cochin in 1917, topping his yearly batch. After graduating in law, he enrolled as an advocate in Madras High Court in 1927 (practising at Ernakulam).

=== With the Congress Party ===
Seethi Sahib entered politics as a student, taking part in the Non-Cooperation Movement in (1920–22). The movement was organized by Mohandas K. Gandhi to induce the British government to grant Self-Government to India. He took active participation in freedom movement along with Barrister A.K. Pillai in Travancore. When Mahatma Gandhi accompanied by Rajaji, Mahadeava Desai and Devadas Gandhi visited Thiruvananthapuram for the first time in connection with the Vaikkom satyagraha on 13 March 1925, it was Seethi Sahib who translated his speech into Malayalam at the reception given by the Thiruvananthapuram Pauravali. In 1928, Seethi Sahib was elected to the Cochin Legislative Assembly (on the Congress ticket). He attended the 1930 Lahore Congress representing "Kerala". A year later (1931), he was re-elected to the Cochin Legislative Assembly with the Congress Party.

In 1932, Seethi Sahib shifted his practice from Ernakulam to Tellicherry. He left Congress in 1933.

=== With the Muslim League ===
During the mid-1930s when the Muslim League ceased to cooperate with the Congress, Seethi Sahib and colleagues started organising the League in Malabar District. In 1946, he was elected to the Madras Legislative Assembly from the Malappuram Constituency, a victory he repeated in 1952.

=== In the new Kerala state ===
Seethi Sahib was the Secretary of the Indian Union Muslim League during the 1957 General Elections in India. The Congress High Command wished to form a tripartite coalition consisting of the Congress Party, the Praja Socialist Party and the Muslim League in the upcoming elections. However, the proposed front was eventually veteod by the Congress Party.

After the Kerala Assembly Election victory against the Communist Party in 1960, Seethi Sahib was elected as the Speaker of the Kerala Assembly (22 February). He represented Kuttippuram Constituency. Seethi Sahib died while in office on 17 April 1961. C. H. Muhammed Koya — only after resigning his legislative party (the League) affiliation — succeeded Seethi Sahib as the Speaker of the Kerala Assembly.

== Influence of Wakkom ==
K. M. Seethi Sahib was inspired by Wakkom Maulavi (1873—1932), a major theological reformer of 20th century Kerala. He had held discussions with Wakkom at the Trivandrum Law College.

Seethi Sahib carried forward the reforms of Wakkom to social and political realms. He "combined the progressive and traditional streams" to became "in the sociopolitical realm, the chief architect of the Muslim revival" in Kerala.

== As a writer ==
Apart from being a politician and prominent lawyer, Seethi Sahib was also a writer and a social worker. He co-founded the Chandrika newspaper, now the official daily of Indian Union Muslim League, in the 1930s.

Individuals such as B. Pocker Sahib, the Muslim League leader, K. K. Muhammad Shafi, the first editor of the newspaper Chandrika, and C. P. Mammu Keyi, its first managing director were highly influenced by Seethi Sahib.

== Legacy ==
- Seethi Sahib was a founding member of the Farook College at Calicut.
- Seethi Sahib Memorial Polytechnic College in Tirur and Seethi Sahib Higher Secondary School in Taliparamba, Seethi Sahib Memorial Higher Secondary School and Teachers Training School are at his home village Azhikode, are named after K. M. Seethi Sahib.

=== Biographies ===
- "Seethi Sahib" (1959), by K. K. Muhammad Abdul Kareem, published by C. H. Muhammad and Sons.
- "Janab K. M. Seethi Sahib" (1960), by M. Alikunhi, published by Green House.
- "Seethi Sahib" (1966), by Abu Siddique, published by Green House.
- "Seethi Sahib" (1992), by T. M. Savankutty, published by the Department of Cultural Publications, Government of Kerala.
- "Navothana Samskrithiyude Speaker Seethi Sahib" (2015), by K. M. Althaf, published by Olive Publications.

Preceded by Sankara Narayanan Thampi	Speaker of Kerala Legislative Assembly; 1960 - 1961	Succeeded by C. H. Mohammed Koya
