= Sathish Ninan =

Indian judge

Hon'ble Justice Sathish Ninan

Judge Kerala High Court
- Incumbent
- Assumed office 5 October 2016

Personal details
- Born: 1 April 1968 (age 58) Ooriapadikkal, Thiruvalla
- Citizenship: Indian
- Education: Master of Laws
- Alma mater: MG University
- Website: High Court of Kerala

Sathish Ninan (born 1 April 1968) is a judge of Kerala High Court.The High Court of Kerala is the highest court in the Indian state of Kerala and in the Union Territory of Lakshadweep. The High Court of Kerala is headquartered at Ernakulam, Kochi.

== Early life ==
Ninan was born to O. N. Ninan and Naliny Ninan at Ooriapadikkal, Thiruvalla, on 1 April 1968. He obtained a law degree from Government Law College, Thiruvananthapuram and master's degree in law from Mahatma Gandhi University, Kottayam.

== Career ==
He enrolled as an advocate on 2 December 1990 and started practicing in civil, constitution, banking and property law. On 5 October 2016 he was elevated as additional judge of High Court of Kerala and became permanent from 16 March 2018.
