= Basant Balaji =

Indian judge

Justice Basant Balaji

Judge of the High Court of Kerala
- Incumbent
- Assumed office 8 October 2021
- Nominated by: N. V. Ramana
- Appointed by: Ram Nath Kovind

Personal details
- Born: 28 May 1972 (age 54) Thiruvananthapuram, Kerala, India
- Parents: Adv. U. Balaji; D. Sreedevi
- Education: Mar Ivanios College, Thiruvananthapuram; Kerala Law Academy Law College, Thiruvananthapuram; University of Kerala
- Website: High Court of Kerala

Basant Balaji (born 28 May 1972) is an Indian judge presently serving on the Kerala High Court, the highest court in the Indian state of Kerala and in the Union Territory of Lakshadweep.

== Education and career ==
Basant completed his schooling from Loyola School, Thiruvananthapuram, pre-degree from Mar Ivanios College, Thiruvananthapuram, graduated in law from Kerala Law Academy and obtained post graduation in business law from the University of Kerala.

Admitted to Bar in 1995 and started practicing in subordinate courts of Thiruvananthapuram and shifted his practice to the High Court of Kerala in 1998. He was appointed as Additional Judge of the High Court of Kerala on 8 October 2021.
