= Mali Madhavan Nair =

Children's writer

V. Madhavan Nair
- Born: 6 December 1914; Thiruvananthapuram, Travancore, British India
- Died: 2 July 1994 (aged 79); Kochi, Kerala, India
- Other name: Mali
- Education: Government Law College, Thiruvananthapuram
- Parent(s): T.K. Velu Pillai, Bhagavathiyamma
- Website: www.malifoundation.org

V. Madhavan Nair (1914–1994) more popularly known as Mali Madhavan Nair was an Indian lawyer, journalist, sportsman, musicologist, kathakali playwright, dramatist, editor and a pioneer in radio broadcasting. Various posts he held include editorial board member of The Free Press Journal, editor of National Book Trust, station director of All India Radio, director of cultural affairs of Travancore Devaswom Board and chief editor of Kerala Nirmithi Kendram. As a journalist he wrote on arts, literature, Indian architecture and sports for a variety of English publications like The Hindu, The Statesman and Malayalam periodicals like Mathrubhumi.

He is more famous for his children's books he wrote under pseudonym "Mali".

== Early life ==
Mali was born on 6 December 1914 in Thiruvananthapuram to T. K. Veluppillai and Bhagavathiyamma. His father, also known as Sadasya Thilakan, was the first elected Deputy Speaker of the Travancore Legislative Assembly, Emeritus Professor of the Law College and member of the Senate of Travancore and Madras Universities. As a youth he was a good tennis player.

== Career as Kathakali dramatist ==
His work Karnashapatham, is the most successful kathakali play written in the 20th century. It saw more than 5000 stage performances during Mali's lifetime. It is deemed a classic by virtue of its theme and the innovative ingredients woven together. Compared to other kathakali plays, Karnasapatham is short, about three and half hours. Typical kathakali plays go on from dusk to dawn. The use of simple Malayalam in the lyrics or padams and the use of ragas such as Reethigowla and Hindolam, some of them for the first time in kathakali, added to its popular appeal. All the padams were written and tuned by Mali himself. It was first sung on stage by Vaikom Thankappan Pillai.

== Children's author ==
He wrote about fifty novels and short stories for children. He was also editor of Malika a magazine for children. His retelling of Mahabharatha and Ramayana for children made him a household name. His novels Circus and Porattam were standard reading for the Kerala 7th standard syllabus.

== Major works ==
- Unnikale Katha Parayam (1954)
- Unnikalkku Janthukathakal (1957)
- Unnikkathakal (1967)
- Mali Ramayanam (1962)
- Mali Bhagavatham (1968)
- Karnashapatham Attakkatha( 1969)
- Jeevanulla Prathima (1979)
- Mali Bharatham (1979)
- Mandakkazhutha (1979)
- Circus (1979)
- Sarvajithum Kallakkadathum (1979)
- Thenali Raman (1981)
- Vikramaditya Kathakal (1981)
- Purana Katha Malika (1981-12 volumes)
- Aitihya Lokam (1986)
- Kishkindha
- Anchu Minute Kathakal

== Death ==
Mali, who suffered from various ailments, died on 2 July 1994 aged 79 at Thiruvananthapuram. His body was cremated with full state honours.
