= A. Badharudeen =

Indian judge (born 1968)

Justice A. Badharudeen

Judge of the Kerala High Court
- Incumbent
- Assumed office 25 June 2021
- Nominated by: Sharad Arvind Bobde
- Appointed by: Ram Nath Kovind

Personal details
- Born: 29 May 1968 (age 58)
- Education: Government Law College, Thiruvananthapuram
- Website: High Court of Kerala

Abdul Rahim Musaliar Badharudeen is an Indian judge who is presently serving as a judge of Kerala High Court. The High Court of Kerala is the highest court in the Indian state of Kerala and in the Union Territory of Lakshadweep. The High Court is headquartered at Ernakulam, Kochi.

== Career ==
Justice Badharudeen was appointed as an additional judge of the Kerala High Court on 25 June 2021 and became permanent from 25 January 2023.
