= B. Sujatha Devi =

Indian writer and activist (1946–2018)

Sujatha Devi
- Born: B. Sujatha Devi; 1946
- Died: 23 June 2018 (aged 71–72); Thiruvananthapuram, Kerala, India
- Occupations: Writer; environmentalist; professor
- Parent: Bodheswaran (father)
- Writing career
- Language: Malayalam
- Notable work: Kadukalude Thalam Thedi
- Notable awards: Kerala Sahitya Akademi Award for Travelogue; 1999

B. Sujatha Devi (1946 – 23 June 2018) was an Indian writer, educator and environmentalist from Kerala. She served as an English teacher at Ernakulam Maharaja's College and Thiruvananthapuram Women's College. In 1999, she won Kerala Sahitya Akademi Award for Best Travelogue for her travelogue Kadukalude Thalam Thedi.

== Personal life ==
Sujatha Devi was the daughter of poet and freedom fighter Bodheswaran and V. K Karthyayani. She was the younger sister of Hridayakumari and Sugathakumari who were poets and teachers.

== Career ==
Sujatha Devi started her career in Thiruvananthapuram Women's College. She later went on to work as professor and English lecturer in Pattambi Government College, Ernakulam Maharaja's College and Chalakkudy College. Mostly known for her travel writing, Sujatha Devi was also a poet.
