= Government Law College, Thiruvananthapuram =

Law College in Kerala, India

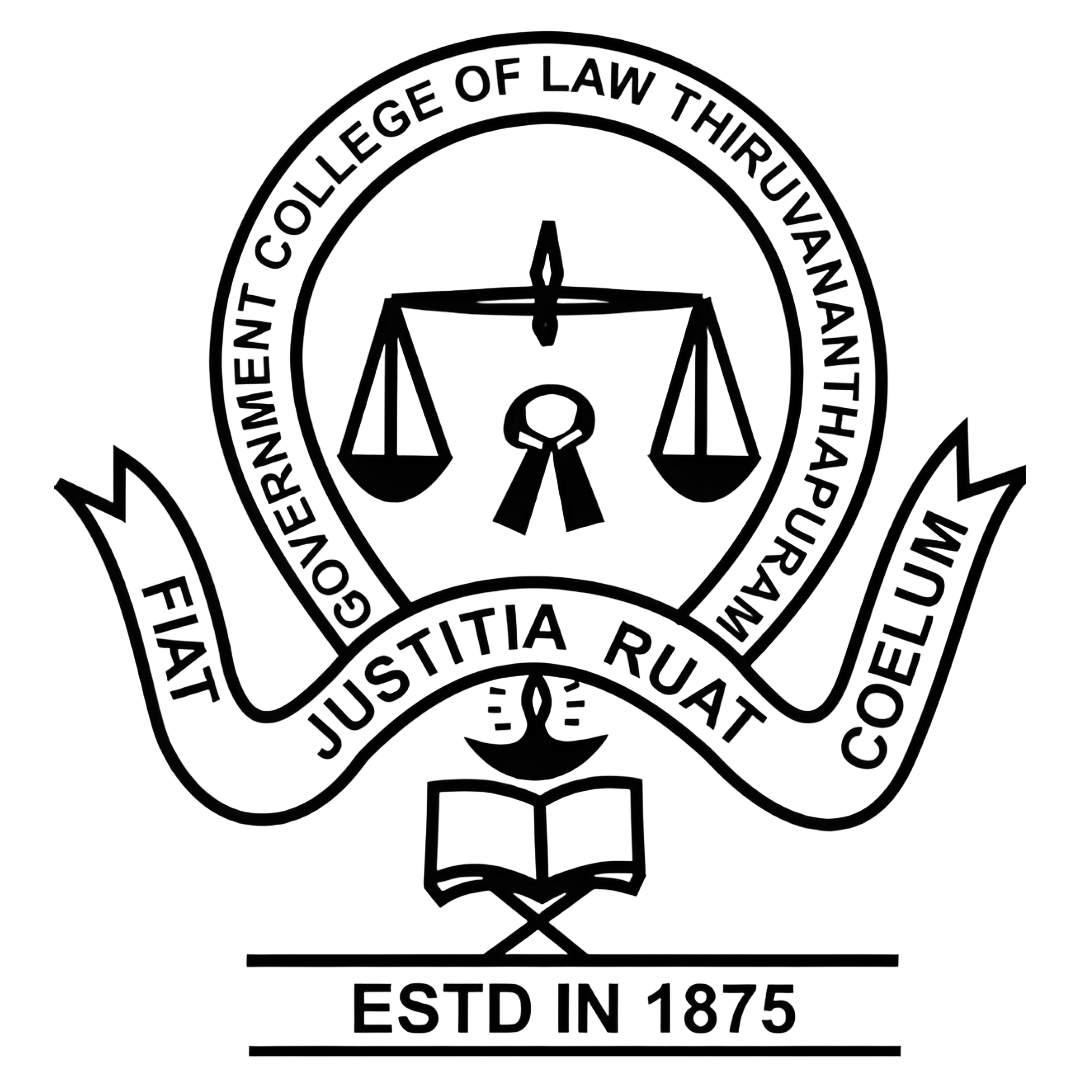
- Emblem
- Other names: GLC Thiruvananthapuram, GLC TVPM, GLCT
- Former names: His Highness The Maharaja's Law College, Thiruvananthapuram
- Motto: Latin: Fiat Justitia Ruat Caelum
- Motto in English: Let justice be done though the heavens fall.
- Type: Public
- Established: 1875; 151 years ago
- Founder: Ayilyam Thirunal Rama Varma IV
- Affiliations: University of Kerala; Bar Council of India
- Principal: Dr. Hameema. M (I/C)
- Undergraduates: 880
- Postgraduates: 30
- Location: Thiruvananthapuram, Kerala, Barton Hill P.O 695035, India; 8.5085°N 76.9427°E
- Campus: Urban
- Language: English
- Website: glctvm.ac.in

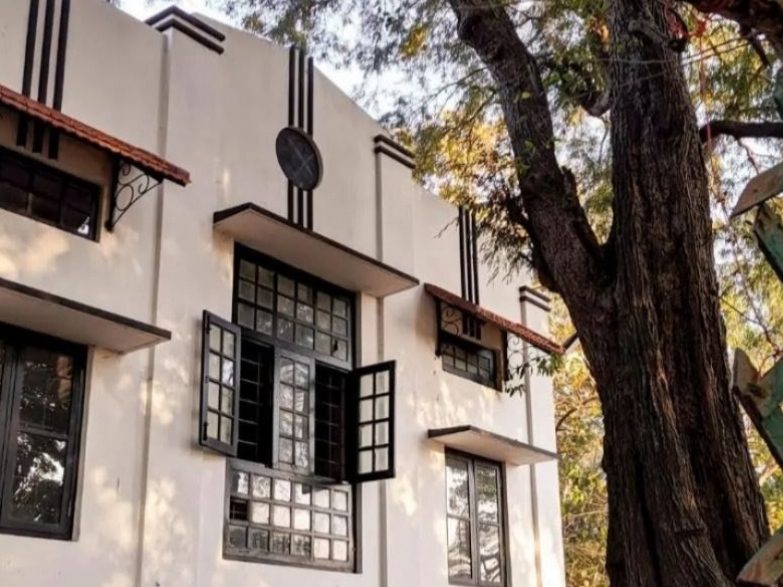
Highland Bungalow at the Campus.

Government Law College, Thiruvananthapuram is an institution for legal education at graduate and post-graduate levels in Kerala, India. Established by the then Maharaja of Travancore in 1875, it is one of the oldest law colleges in India. Affiliated to the Faculty of Law of University of Kerala and the Bar Council of India, the college is supervised and controlled by the Government of Kerala.

The campus is housed in the Highland Bungalow situated in Barton Hill, which is a green space in the heart of city. An eminent centre of research in Law, the college has one of the oldest and largest law libraries in India.

The college offers an undergraduate five-year integrated Bachelor of Arts–Bachelor of Laws (B.A. LL.B.) program along with three-year LL.B. program, both of which qualify the student to sit for the bar to practice law in India. Post-graduate law degrees (LL.M.) are offered in two lines of specialization: Constitution Law & Criminal Law.

Alumni of the college include judges of the Supreme Court of India such as Justice Fathima Beevi, judges of various High Courts, statesmen and academicians like N. R. Madhava Menon.

== History ==
The government of Ayilyam Thirunal, the Maharaja of Travancore, on 31 January 1875, sanctioned "the Organisation of a Law Class in connection with His Highness The Maharaja's College at Thiruvananthapuram to enable candidates from Travancore to present themselves for the Law Examination of the University of Madras and to encourage others to pursue the study of law systematically". The order directed that it should be worked on the same lines as the class attached to the Presidency College at Madras. W. E. Ormsby, Barrister-at-law, then a judge of Sadur Court of Travancore was appointed Professor of Law in H. H. College. He opened the class on 9 February of the same year. In 1877, H. H. College was affiliated to the University of Madras in the Faculty of Law.

The class was thus continued till 1894, when in conformity with important alterations in the by-laws of the Madras University regarding the B.L. Degree Examination, the institution was re-organised on an entirely different footing. The law class – which till then was working as a part of H. H. College (and whose professors were treated as members of that college) – was raised to the status of an independent college named "His Highness Maharaja's Law College, Thiruvananthapuram". A complete set of rules was also sanctioned by the Government for the control and regulation of work in the college. The rules prescribed the qualification required for the members of the teaching staff.

The college was maintained by His Highness's Government and the management of the college was vested in the Principal acting directly under the orders of Dewan of Travancore till the end of 1908. In 1909, the college was placed under the Director of Public Instruction and in 1910, under the High Court. With the inauguration of University of Travancore in 1938, the college was transferred to the control and supervision of the university.

In August 1949, the college was shifted to Ernakulam to fit in with the new set up arising out of the integration of erstwhile State of Travancore-Cochin and the location of the High Court of the united state at Ernakulam. In 1954, it was again brought to Thiruvananthapuram, leaving at Ernakulam, a sister college and was housed in the current premises in the Highland Bungalow on the Barton Hill. Under the University Act of 1957, the college was transferred to the control of Government of Kerala. In 1961, the Government made the college a permanent institution.

In 1962–63, a full-time post-graduate course was introduced with M. L. Degree and LL.M course was started in 1971. A three-year LL.B course was started from 1967 to 1968 and a five year LL.B. course was introduced from the academic year 1984–85.

== Campus ==
The Government Law College, Thiruvananthapuram is housed in the Highland Bungalow of Walthew Clarance Barton (1834–1903), the first Chief Engineer of the erstwhile state of Travancore. Many new blocks were later added in the five-acre green campus in the heart of the city.

== Academics ==
=== Admissions ===
Admissions to both undergraduate and postgraduate programs at the college are through the Kerala Law Entrance Examination (KLEE) conducted by the Commissioner for Entrance Examination, Government of Kerala.

=== Academic programmes ===
==== B.A., LL.B (Integrated) ====
The college offers an undergraduate five-year integrated LL.B. program which, upon completion, qualifies the student to sit for the bar to practice law in India.

This is a double degree Integrated course comprising B.A (English) and LL.B degrees. The bachelor's degree in B.A. and Law consists of regular course of study for a minimum period of 10 semesters in five years and has 14 papers in B.A. and 31 papers in Law.

==== LL.B (three-year course) ====
The college also offers a three-year LL.B. program which, upon completion, qualifies the student to sit for the bar to practice law in India.

The bachelor's degree in law (LL.B) consists of a regular course of study for a minimum period of 6 semesters in three years and has 20 compulsory papers, 4 compulsory clinical papers and 6 optional papers in Law.

==== Masters in Law (LL.M) ====
Post-graduate law degrees are offered in two lines of specialization: Constitution Law & Criminal Law. The normal duration of the LL.M. programme is four semesters. Government Law College Thiruvananthapuram was one of the few colleges to run a LL.M Programme in Constitution Law.

==== LL.M (evening batch) ====
The Government of Kerala directed that a 20 student batch should start from 2015 to 2016.

=== Library ===
The GLC Thiruvananthapuram Library is one of the oldest law libraries in the country. Known for its rare collection of books and treatise on various subjects not limited to law, it holds over 27,000 books and 5000 periodicals. Being an important resource center, the library is primarily intended to provide undergraduate and postgraduate readers with the books they need for their studies.

=== Research block ===
In 2013, Research Center in Law status was accorded to the college by the University of Kerala. By 2013, the college requested the formation of a chair named Malloor Govinda Pillai Chair on Criminal Law, and a proposal to form Justice K.K Mathew Chair on Constitutional Law was also pending with the government.

== Student life ==
=== Hostel ===
The Hostel Block inaugurated by the then President of India, Fakhruddin Ali Ahmed as a men's hostel was converted into a women's hostel in 2012. The admission is made by the Warden for students from second year of study onward. The male students are now accommodated in a separate block at University Hostel for men at Palayam, Thiruvananthapuram.

=== National Service Scheme ===
The National Service Scheme is an Indian government-sponsored programme under the Department of Youth Affairs and Sports of the Government of India. The college has two NSS units and has been involved in many social service activities in rural areas and has organised many legal aid and legal literacy programs in addition to forest conservation, environmental protection and blood donation camps. In 2012, Assistant Professor K. Hareendran of the college was selected as the "Best Programme Officer of NSS" for the University of Kerala.

=== Student publications ===
Government Law College Thiruvananthapuram magazine is brought out annually by the college union. The Student Editor is chosen by an electoral college consisting of all students of the college, and the Staff Editor is nominated by the Staff Council headed by the college Principal. N. R. Madava Menon was the student editor during 1954–55.

In 2016, the Internal Quality Assurance Cell (I.Q.A.C.) launched Legal WRIT (Writings on Research and Innovative Topics), an annual student-edited in-house journal devised to improve the quality and the academic talents of the students aiming for the promotion of reading, writing and research among students.

=== National Cadet Corps ===
The National Cadet Corps (NCC) is the youth wing of the Indian Armed Forces under the Ministry of Defence. In 2023, the NCC sub-unit under 1(K) Naval Unit NCC Akkulam was established in the Government Law College Thiruvananthapuram.

== Notable alumni ==
=== Judiciary ===
- Fathima Beevi, former judge, Supreme Court of India, (first female judge of Supreme Court of India) and 11th Governor of Tamilnadu State
- K. K. Mathew, former judge, Supreme Court of India
- Cyriac Joseph, former judge, Supreme Court of India
- Anna Chandy, former judge, High Court of Kerala (first female judge and later first female High Court judge in India)
- Padmanabhan Subramanian Poti, former Chief Justice of Kerala and Gujarat High Courts
- D. Sreedevi, former judge, High Court of Kerala and former chairperson, Kerala Women's Commission
- B. Kemal Pasha, former judge, High Court of Kerala
- T. V. Anilkumar, former judge, High Court of Kerala
- N. Anil Kumar, former judge, High Court of Kerala
- P. Habeeb Mohamed, former judge, The High Court of Travancore (princely state)
- Sathish Ninan, Judge, High Court of Kerala
- P. Somarajan, former Judge, High Court of Kerala
- C. S. Dias, Judge, High Court of Kerala
- A. Badharudeen, Judge, High Court of Kerala
- K. Babu, Judge, High Court of Kerala
- P. G. Ajithkumar, Judge, High Court of Kerala

=== Legislature ===
- Annie Mascarene, member of the Constituent Assembly of India and the First Lok Sabha.
- V. R. Krishnan Ezhuthachan, Former Member of Cochin Legislative Council
- R. Sankara Narayanan Thampi, first speaker of Kerala Legislative Assembly
- K. M. Seethi, former speaker of Kerala Legislative Assembly
- D. Damodaran Potti, former speaker of Kerala Legislative Assembly
- N. Sakthan, former speaker of Kerala Legislative Assembly
- V. D. Satheesan, Chief minister of Kerala
- V. Parameswaran Nayar, former Member of Parliament
- M. I. Shanavas, former Member of Parliament
- A. Sampath, former Member of Parliament Loksabha
- Jose K. Mani, Member of Parliament Rajaysabha
- Mathew Kuzhalnadan, member of Kerala Legislative Assembly
- T.V. Rajesh, former member of Kerala Legislative Assembly
- K. K. Ramachandran Nair, former member of Kerala Legislative Assembly
- P. Aisha Potty, former Member of Kerala Legislative Assembly

=== Government ===
- Pattom A. Thanu Pillai, former Chief minister of Kerala
- R. Sankar, former Chief minister of Kerala
- C. Achutha Menon, former Chief minister of Kerala
- P. K. Vasudevan Nair, former Chief minister of Kerala
- E. Ikkanda Warrier, 3rd Prime Minister of Cochin
- C. Kesavan, former Chief minister of Travancore-Cochin
- V. D. Satheesan, Chief Minister of Kerala
- K.T. Achuthan, former minister, Government of Kerala
- P. T. Chacko, Former Home Minister of Kerala
- Ramesh Chennithala, former Home Minister of Kerala
- Thiruvanchoor Radhakrishnan, former Home Minister, Speaker of Kerala Assembly
- K. R. Gouri Amma, former minister, Government of Kerala
- K. C. Joseph, former minister, Government of Kerala
- M. Vijayakumar, former Minister of Law, Government of Kerala
- M. N. Govindan Nair, former minister, Government of Kerala
- K. A. Damodara Menon, former minister, Government of Kerala
- T. M. Jacob, former minister, Government of Kerala
- Mathew T. Thomas, former minister, Government of Kerala
- G. Sudhakaran, former minister, Government of Kerala
- E. Ahamed, former Minister of State, External Affairs
- M. B. Rajesh, Former Minister for Excise, Government of Kerala
- Kodikunnil Suresh, former Minister of State, Labour, MP
- N. K. Premachandran, former minister, Government of Kerala, MP
- P. C. Vishnunath, Minister Government of Kerala

=== Bureaucrats ===
- N. R. Madhava Menon, former Central Secretariat Service officer, founder of National Law School of India University, West Bengal National University of Juridical Sciences and former director of National Judicial Academy (India)
- V. Joseph Thomas IPS, former Director General of Kerala Police
- Abdul Sathar Kunju IPS, former Director General of Kerala Police
- Malayattoor Ramakrishnan, former IAS officer and award-winning writer
- T P Sundararajan, former IPS officer and assistant director of Intelligence Bureau

=== Malayalam film industry ===
- Resul Pookutty, Oscar winning sound designer
- Sukumaran, State Best Actor award winner
- Bheeman Raghu, actor and police officer
- Anoop Menon, actor and scriptwriter
- Shankar Ramakrishnan, actor and scriptwriter
- Karamana Janardanan Nair, actor
- Sudeep Kumar, singer

=== Others ===
- K. M. Mathew, former Chief Editor, Malayala Manorama
- Mali Madhavan Nair, author and journalist
- Aiyappan Pillai, lawyer and politician

== Popular culture ==
The film Thalasthanam – directed by Shaji Khailas, scripted by Renji Panicker, and starring Suresh Gopi revolves around the politics of Government Law College Thiruvananthapuram.

Shooting also took place in Government Law College for Randam Varavu, directed by K. Madhu and starring Jayaram.

== See also ==
- Government Law College, Ernakulam
- Kerala Law Academy Law College, Thiruvananthapuram
- University of Kerala
