= Government College for Women, Thiruvananthapuram =

Public college in Kerala, India

Coordinates: 8°29′58″N 76°57′23″E

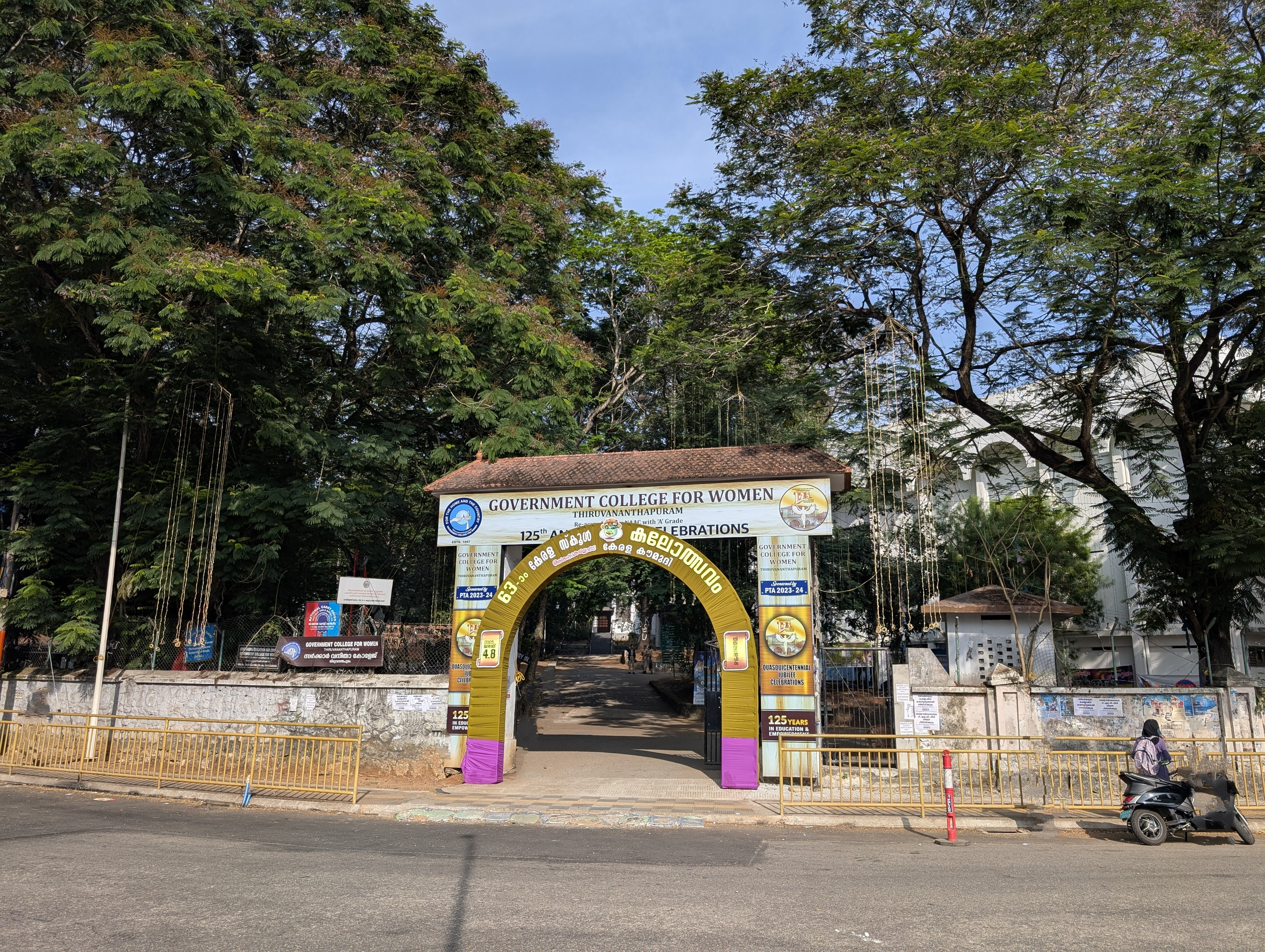
- Former names: Sircar Girls' School; The Maharaja’s College for Girls; H.H. The Maharaja's College for Women
- Type: Public
- Established: 1864; 162 years ago
- Founder: Ayilyam Thirunal
- Affiliations: University of Kerala
- Location: Thiruvananthapuram, Kerala, India
- Campus: Urban
- Website: http://www.gcwtvm.ac.in

Government College for Women, Thiruvananthapuram is a public college situated in Thiruvananthapuram, Kerala, India. Established in 1864 by Ayilyam Thirunal, the Maharaja of Travancore, it is one of the oldest women's colleges in Kerala. Initially affiliated to University of Madras, it is currently under University of Kerala.

== Academic Programmes ==
The college offers undergraduate and postgraduate programmes in arts and science affiliated to the Kerala University. It has been accredited by NAAC with an A Grade. The college is ranked 49th among colleges in India by the National Institutional Ranking Framework (NIRF) in 2024.

== Departments ==
=== Science ===
- Physics
- Chemistry
- Mathematics
- Botany
- Zoology
- Statistics
- Home science
- Psychology
- Bio-Chemistry and Industrial Microbiology

=== Arts and Commerce ===
- English

Hindi Malayalam

- History
- Economics
- Music
- Commerce
- Philosophy

== Accreditation ==
The college is recognized by the University Grants Commission (UGC).

== Notable alumni ==
- Veena George, Minister for Health & Family Welfare, Government of Kerala
- Vinduja Menon, Malayalam film actress
- Nabeesa Ummal, Indian politician and former MLA
- Minnu Mani, Indian International cricketer
- K S Chithra, Indian playback singer
- Parvathi T, Indian film actress
- Sarah Thomas (writer), Malayali author
- Sugathakumari, Indian poet and activist
- Manjari, Malayalam playback singer
- Nalini Netto, Former Chief Secretary of State of Kerala
- Fathima Beevi, First female justice of Supreme Court of India
- Sona Nair, Indian actress
- Thushara Pillai, Astrophysicist
