= Justice C. S. Dias =

Indian judge of Kerala High Court

Hon'ble Justice Justice C. S. Dias
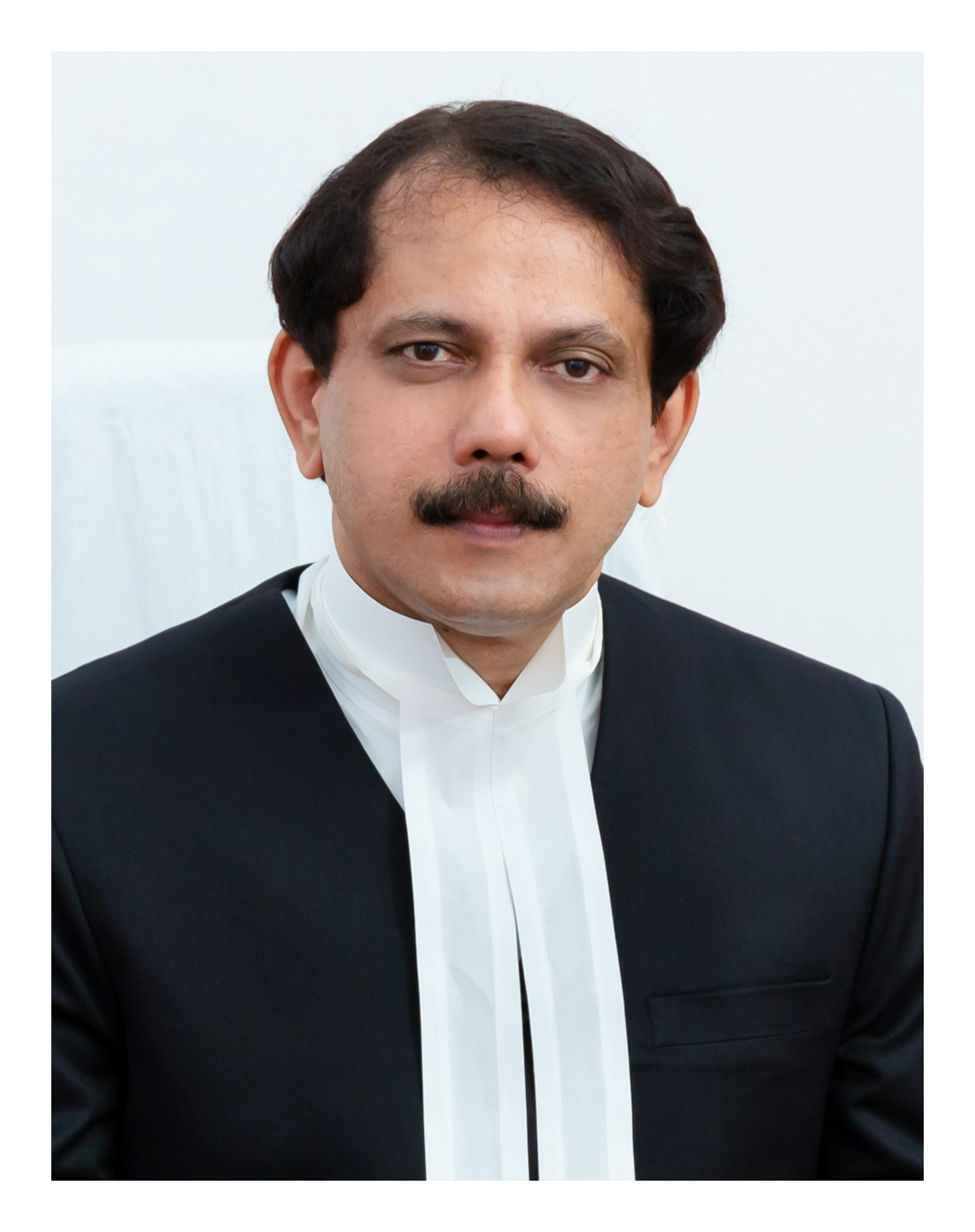

Judge of Kerala High Court
- Incumbent
- Assumed office 18 November 2019
- Nominated by: Ranjan Gogoi
- Appointed by: Ram Nath Kovind

Personal details
- Born: 19 November 1969 (age 56) Ernakulam, Kochi, India
- Spouse: Adv Mini Dias
- Parents: Adv.R.G.Dias (father); Phyllis Dias (mother)
- Education: Government Law College, Thiruvananthapuram
- Website: High Court of Kerala

Conrad Stansilaus Dias (born 19 November 1969) is a judge of the Kerala High Court, the highest court in the Indian state of Kerala and in the Union Territory of Lakshadweep. The court is headquartered at Ernakulam, Kochi.

== Early life ==
Dias was born in Ernakulam, Kerala, to Adv. R.G.Dias and Phyllis Dias. He is an Anglo Indian. He did his schooling at the Kendriya Vidyalaya, Ernakulam. He secured his law degree from Government Law College, Thiruvananthapuram in 1992.

== Career ==
Dias completed his law in 1992 and started practising as a lawyer in the High Court of Kerala. He has done his Masters in Criminal Law. He specialised in the fields of Civil, Constitutional, Family and Arbitration laws. He served as counsel for the High Court of Kerala from 2016 to 2019, Retainer Standing Counsel for the Ministry of Railways from 2010 to 2019, Central Government Counsel from 2012- 2015; member of the National Advisory Committee to the Ministry of Women and Child Development 2018 - 2019. He was appointed as amicus curiae by the High Court in several cases, including the Puttingal fireworks tragedy case. On 18 November 2019 he was appointed as additional judge of the High Court of Kerala. He was made a permanent judge of the High Court of Kerala on 25 May 2021. He is the Administrative Judge In Charge of Kozhikode District. He is a member of the Board of Governors of the Kerala State Mediation and Conciliation Centre and the Board of Governors of the Kerala High Court Arbitration Centre. He is also a member of the Sensitisation Committee for Family Courts, a member of the Computerisation and Codification Committee, and the Editorial Board Member of the Kerala High Court Newsletter - Chronicles. He is the Chairman of the Happiness, Welfare and Grievance Committee for the District Judiciary of the Kerala State. He is a visiting professor in National University of Advanced Legal Studies
