= Bodheswaran =

Indian independence activist (1901–1990)

Bodheshwaran
- Born: Keshava Pillai; 28 December 1901; Neyyattinkara, Kingdom of Travancore, British India
- Died: 3 July 1990 (aged 88)
- Occupations: Indian independence activist; Social reformer; Poet
- Spouse: V. K. Karthiyayini Amma
- Children: Hridayakumari; Sugathakumari; Sujatha Devi
- Parents: Kunjan Pillai; Janaki Pillai

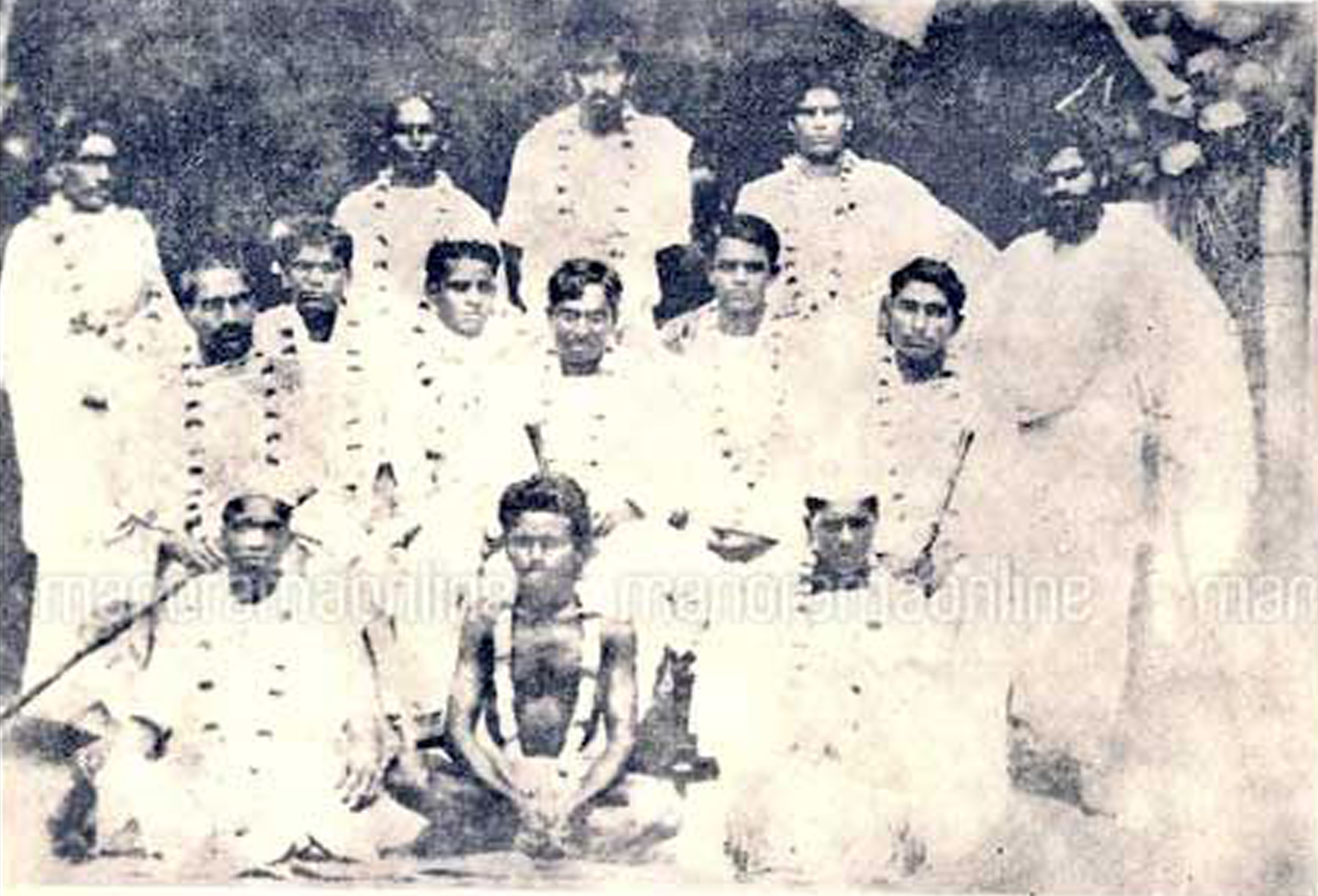
Leaders of Vaikom Satyagraha

Keshava Pillai (born 28 December 1901 – 3 July 1990), better known as Bodheswaran was an Indian independence activist, social reformer and a poet of Malayalam literature. He was known for his nationalistic poems such as Keralaganam and for his involvement in social movements like Vaikom Satyagraha and other related events which led to the Temple Entry Proclamation of 1936.

== Biography ==
Bodheswaran, né Keshava Pillai, was born on 28 December 1901 in Neyyattinkara, in Travancore (in the present day Thiruvananthapuram, Kerala, India) to Champayil Veettil Kunjan Pillai and Thazhamangalam Janaki Pillai Amma.Siblings: Kunju Lekshmi Amma, Parameshwara Pillai, Devaki Amma, Krishnan Nair, Saraswathy Amma :

Influenced by the thoughts of Swami Vivekananda from an early age, he left his studies to visit the social and religious reformer Narayana Guru with whom he stayed for about two years. Subsequently, he travelled throughout India and during a visit to the Kashi Vishwanath Temple, he assumed the name of Bodheswarananda. It was during these travels, he met several Sannyasins and Indian independence activists; he also had the opportunity to attend the public meetings of Mahatma Gandhi and Motilal Nehru.

Bodheswaran was first married to Smt. Chellamma Amma, in that relation he has a daughter, Smt. Swathanthra Kumari(Settled in UK). Latter he married V. K. Karthiyayini Amma, a professor of Sanskrit in the Government Sanskrit College, Thiruvananthapuram. The couple had three daughters, Hridayakumari, Sugathakumari and Sujatha, all the three being writers. He died on 3 July 1990, at the age of 88.

== With Chattampi Swamikal and Sree Narayana Guru ==
On his return to Kerala, Bodheswaran was advised by Narayana Guru to meet Chattampi Swamikal, who was known to have been a major influence in his life. Thereafter, he kept his association with Swamikal, while getting involved the Indian freedom struggle and made several public speeches which were said to have attracted large crowds. After a short spell during which he favoured the Arya Samaj movement, he got involved in the Vaikom Satyagraha and other related events until the Temple Entry Proclamation of 1936. He also became a member of the Indian National Congress and changed his name once more, to Bodheswaran.

After Indian independence Bodheswaran gradually withdrew from active politics, although he remained a Congressman until his death. He lectured and wrote on the subject of Swamikal, his belief as quoted by Nair and Devi is that Swamikal was "an embodiment of perfect knowledge".

== Legacy and honours ==
Bodheswaran was known for his poems reflecting nationalistic fervour during his involvement in the Indian independence movement which included Keralaganam, a popular patriotic song of the times. He published six books which, besides poetry anthologies, include a compilation of his speeches. He attempted to write a comprehensive world history covering the period up to World War I but could not complete it. Suprabhatham, a magazine he founded, also had only a short life.

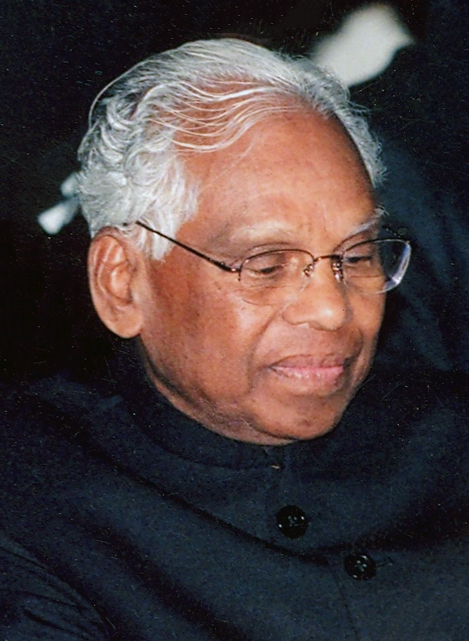
K. R. Narayanan

The Government of India honoured him with the Thamra Patra (Copper Plaque) for his contributions to the Indian independence movement. His birth centenary was celebrated in 2002 when K. R. Narayanan, the then president of India, inaugurated Bodheshwaran Foundation, an eponymous organization, for propagating his ideals. Keralaganam, his patriotic song, was declared as the cultural song of Kerala in 2014.

== Bibliography ==
- Bodheswaran (1982). Thiranhedutha kavithakal (Bodheswaran).
- Bodheswaran (1948). Raktha Rekhakal (Pusthakam - 1).
- Bodheswaran. Swathanthra Keralam. Ernakulam.
- Bodheswaran. Hrudhayanguram.
- Bodheswaran (2015). Sugathakumari (ed.). Bodheswarante thiranjedutha kavithakal. Thiruvananthapuram: Priyadarsini.

== See also ==
- List of Malayalam-language authors by category
- List of Malayalam-language authors
