= Sugathakumari =

Indian poet and activist (1934–2020)

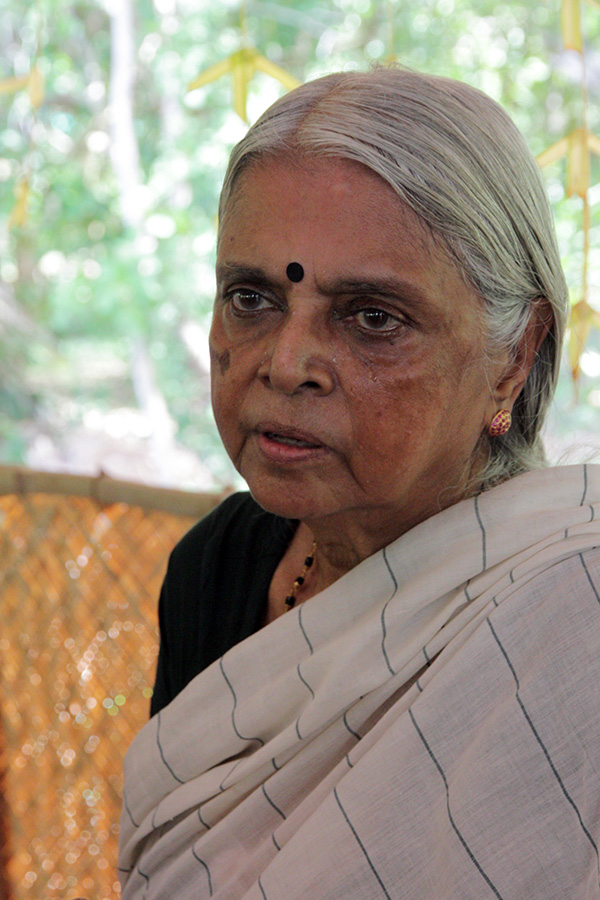
- Sugathakumari
- Born: Sugathakumari; 22 January 1934; Aranmula, Quilon, Travancore
- Died: 23 December 2020 (aged 86); Thiruvananthapuram, Kerala, India
- Education: University College, Thiruvananthapuram; Government College for Women, Thiruvananthapuram
- Occupations: Poet; activist
- Spouse: Dr. K. Velayudhan Nair (died 2003)
- Children: 1
- Parent(s): Keshava Pillai a.k.a. Bodheswaran (father); V. K. Karthiyayini Amma (mother)
- Writing career
- Language: Malayalam
- Period: 1957–2020
- Notable works: Raathrimazha; Ambalamani; Manalezhuthu
- Notable awards: 1968 Kerala Sahitya Akademi Award for Poetry; 1978 Sahitya Akademi Award; 2006 Padma Shri; 2009 Ezhuthachan Puraskaram

Sugathakumari (22 January 1934 – 23 December 2020) was an Indian poet and activist, who was at the forefront of environmental and feminist movements in Kerala, India.

== Early life ==
Sugathakumari was born in Aranmula on 22 January 1934 in the modern day southern Indian state of Kerala (then in the Kingdom of Travancore). Her father Keshava Pillai, known as Bodheswaran, was a famous Gandhian thinker and writer, who was involved in the country's freedom struggle. V. K. Karthiyayini Amma, her mother, was a well-known scholar and teacher of Sanskrit. Sugathakumari was the second of the three daughters of her parents, following an elder sister named Hrdayakumari, and preceding a younger sister named Sujatha Devi, both of them who excelled in literary field. After graduating from the University College, Thiruvananthapuram, Sugathakumari completed her master's degree in philosophy from Government College for Women, Thiruvananthapuram in 1955, and spent three years researching on the topic of 'Comparative Study of the Concept of Moksha in Indian Schools of Philosophy' but did not complete the thesis. Sugathakumari was the former state vice president of Kerala Students Union (KSU). She worked at KSU for 3 years, from 1959-1962.

== Literary career ==
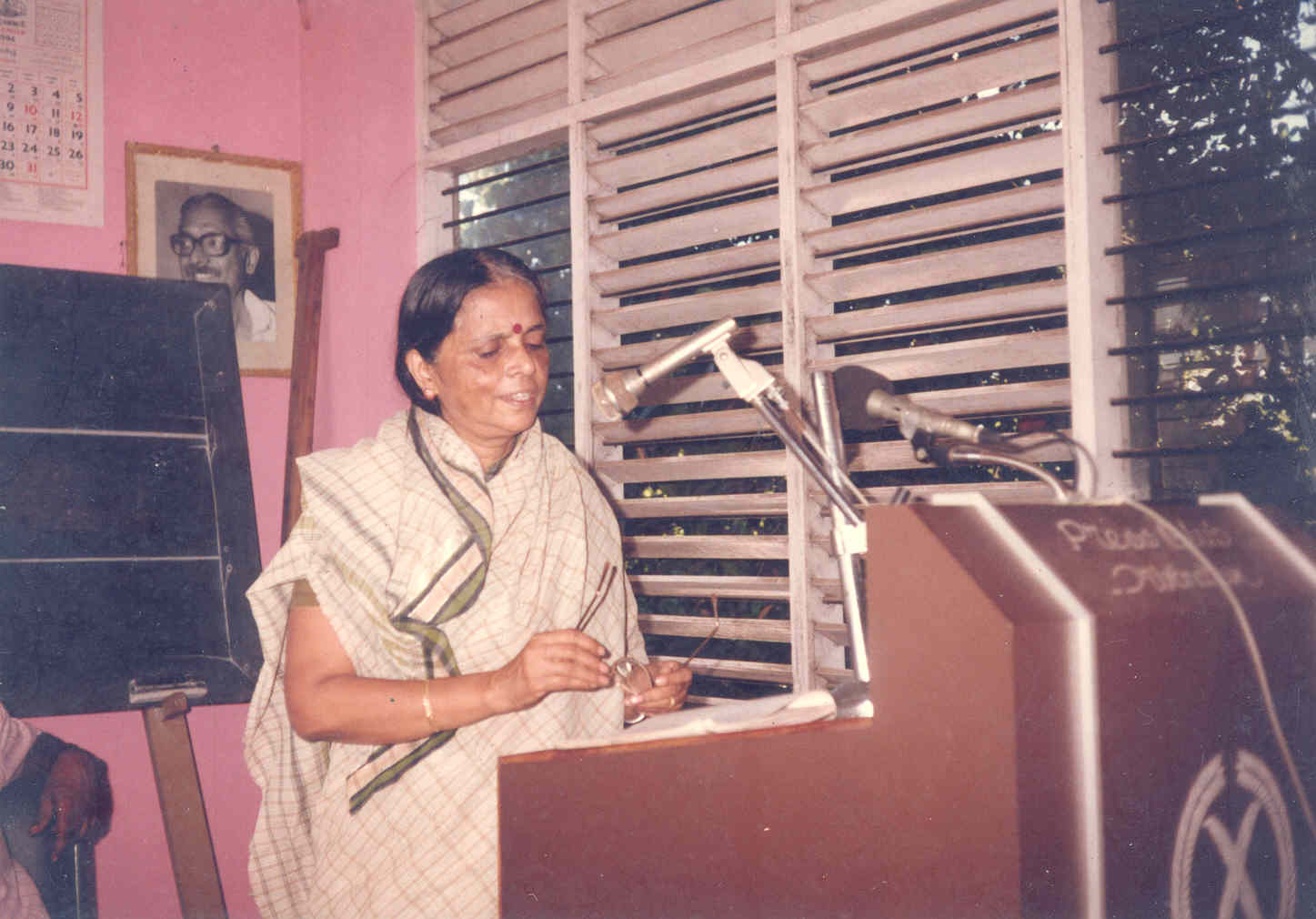
Sugathakumari during the Fokkana Award distribution ceremony, Thiruvananthapuram (1994)

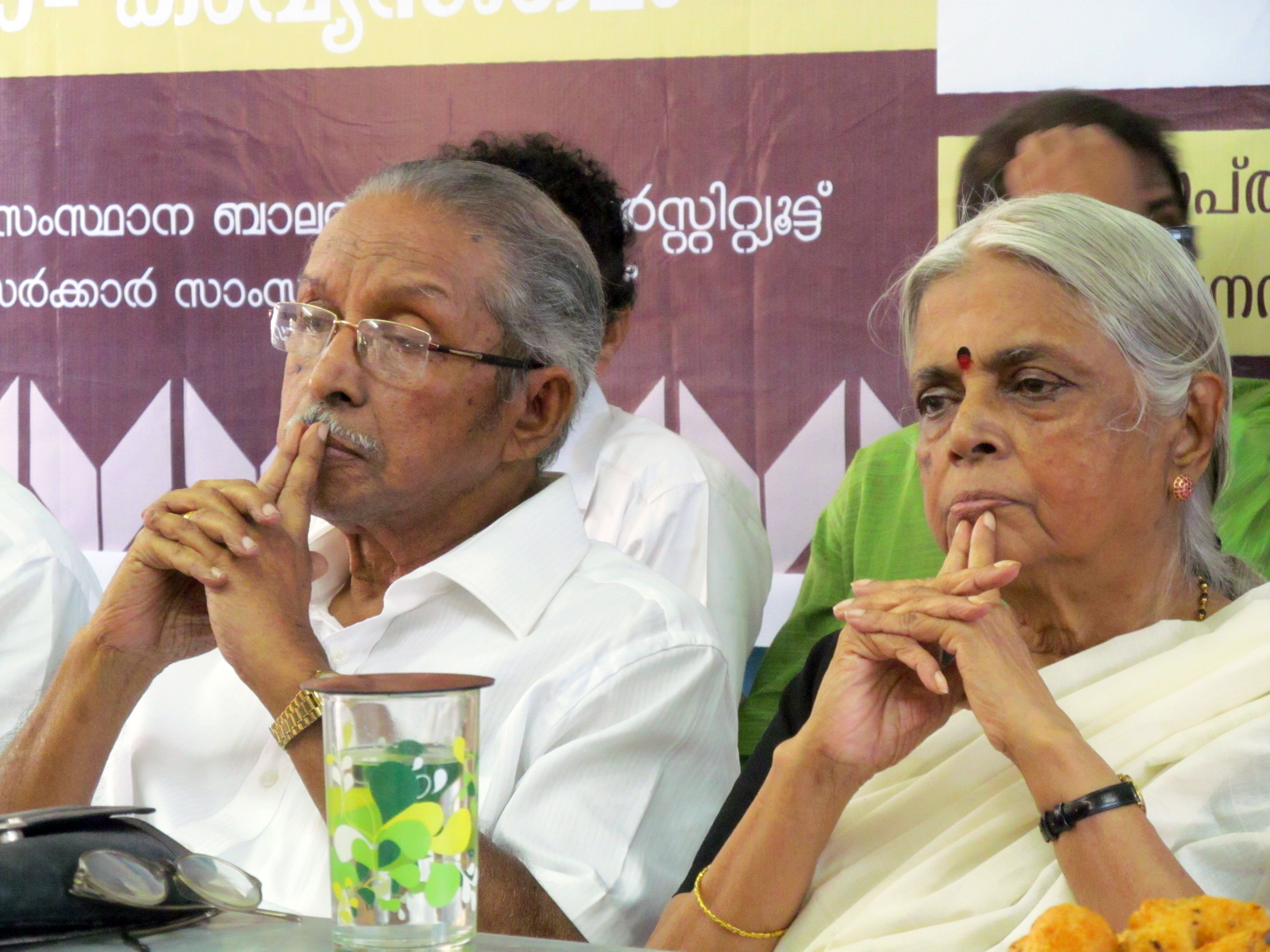
O. N. V. Kurup and Sugathakumari in September 2013

Sugathakumari's first poem, which she published under a pseudonym in a weekly journal in 1957, attracted wide attention. In 1968, Sugathakumari won the Kerala Sahitya Akademi Award for Poetry for her work Pathirappookal (Flowers of Midnight). Raathrimazha (Night Rain) won the Kendra Sahitya Academy Award in 1978. Her other collections include Paavam Manavahridayam, Muthuchippi, Manalezhuth, Irulchirakukal and Swapnabhoomi. Sugathakumari's earlier poetry mostly dealt with the tragic quest for love and is considered more lyrical than her later works, in which the quiet, lyrical sensibility is replaced by increasingly feminist responses to social disorder and injustice. Environmental issues and other contemporary problems are also sharply portrayed in her poetry.

Sugathakumari has been described as among the most sensitive and most philosophical of contemporary Malayalam poets. Her poetry drew on her sadness. In an interview, she said, "I have been inspired to write mostly through my emotional upheavals; few of my poems can be called joyous. But these days I feel I'm slowly walking away from it all, to a world that is futile or meaningless". Sugathakumari's most famous works include Raathrimazha, Ambalamani (temple bell) and Manalezhuthu. Sugathakumari also wrote children's literature, receiving an Award for Lifetime Contribution to Children's Literature, instituted by the State Institute of Children's Literature, in 2008. She also translated many pieces of work into Malayalam.

She won numerous other awards for her literary works, including the Vayalar Award and Ezhuthachan Puraskaram, the highest literary honour from the Government of Kerala. In 2004, she was given the Kerala Sahitya Akademi Fellowship. She won the Saraswati Samman in 2012, being only the third Malayalam writer to do so. She also won the Pandit Karuppan Award. She was the principal of Kerala State Jawahar Balabhavan, Thiruvananthapuram. She was the founding chief editor of 'Thaliru', a children's magazine published by Kerala State Institute of Children's Literature.

== Social activism ==
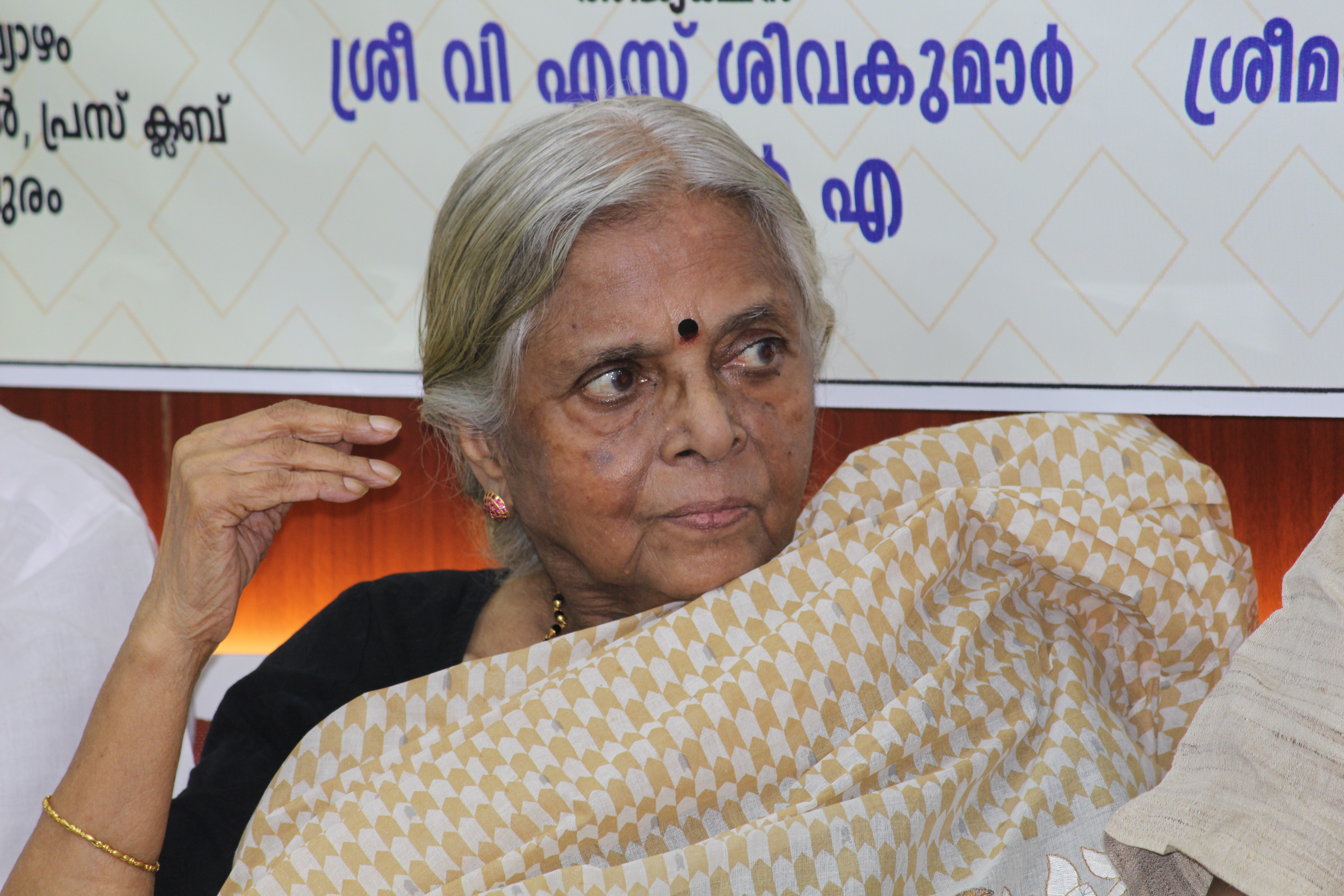
Sugathakumari in 2017

A committed conservationist, Sugathakumari served as the secretary of the Society for Conservation of Nature, Thiruvananthapuram. In the late 1970s she led a successful nationwide movement, known as Save Silent Valley, to save some of the oldest natural forests in the country, the Silent Valley in Kerala, from submersion as a result of a planned hydroelectric project. Her poem Marathinu Stuthi (Ode to a Tree) became a symbol for the protest from the intellectual community and was the opening song of most of the Save Silent Valley campaign meetings. She was the founding secretary of the Prakrithi Samrakshana Samithi, an organisation for the protection of nature. She was also actively involved with various women's movements of the 1970s and served as the chairperson of the Kerala State Women's Commission.

Sugathakumari also founded Abhaya (refuge), an organisation that provides shelter to female mental patients, after being appalled at conditions in the government-run mental hospital in Thiruvananthapuram. Three women led by social activist and artist G. Geetha, demanded a probe into the rape of a Dalit inmate woman by two counselors and the hostel warden of 'Abhaya' in 2002.

Sugathakumari received the Bhattia Award for Social Science, the Sacred Soul International Award, the Lakshmi Award for social service, and the first Indira Priyadarshini Vriksha Mitra Award from the Government of India for her efforts in environmental conservation and afforestation.

== Personal life ==
Sugathakumari's husband Dr. K. Velayudhan Nair (died 2003) was an educationist and writer who was an expert in educational psychology. They had a daughter, Lekshmi Devi. Sugathakumari's elder sister Hridayakumari was a literary critic, orator and educationist. Her younger sister B. Sujatha Devi was also a writer. The Kerala government declared Sugathakumari's ancestral house, Vazhuvelil Tharavadu, as a protected monument on her 84th birthday.

Sugathakumari died on 23 December 2020, due to complications from COVID-19 during the COVID-19 pandemic in India, at the Government Medical College, Thiruvananthapuram, thirty days short from her 87th birthday. She was cremated with full state honours at Santhikavadam crematorium in Thiruvananthapuram on the same day.

== Works ==
- Mutthuchippi (Pearl and Oyster; 1961)
- Pathirappookkal (Midnight Flowers; 1967)
- Paavam Pavam Manava Hrudayam (Poor Human Heart; 1968)
- Pranamam (Salutation; 1969)
- Irul Chirakukal (The Wings of Darkness; 1969)
- Raathrimazha (Night Rain; 1977)
- Ambalamani (Temple Bell; 1981)
- Kurinjippookkal (Kurinji Flowers; 1987) Pavada was also one of her works
- Thulaavarshappacha (The Monsoon Green; 1990)
- Radhayevide (Where is Radha?; 1995)
- Devadasi (1998)
- Manalezhuthu (The Writing on the Sand; 2006)
- Abhisarika
- Sugathakumariyude Kavithakal (2006)
- Krishnakavithakal (2008)
- Megham Vannu Thottappol (2010)
- Poovazhi Maruvazhi
- Kaadinu Kaaval

== Awards and recognitions ==
=== Civilian honours ===
- 2006: Padma Shri

=== Literary awards ===
- 1968: Kerala Sahitya Akademi Award for Poetry for Pathirappookkal
- 1978: Kendra Sahitya Akademi Award for Rathrimazha
- 1982: Odakkuzhal Award for Ambalamani
- 1984: Vayalar Award for Ambalamani
- 1990: Asan Prize
- 2001: Lalithambika Sahitya Award
- 2003: Vallathol Award
- 2004: Kerala Sahitya Akademi Fellowship
- 2004: Balamaniamma Award
- 2004: Bahrain Keraleeya Samajam Sahitya Award
- 2006: Deviprasadam Trust Award
- 2007: P. Kunhiraman Nair Award for Manalezhuthu
- 2008: Mahakavi Pandalam Keralavarma Poetry Award
- 2008: Award for Lifetime Contribution to Children's Literature
- 2009: Ezhuthachan Award
- 2009: Basheer Puraskaram
- 2012: Saraswati Samman for Manalezhuthu
- 2013: PKV Award for Literature
- 2013: Pandit Karuppan Award
- 2014: Nalappadan Award for his Holistic Contributions to Malayalam Literature (Nalappadan Memorial Cultural Society-NMCS)
- 2014: VT Literary Award
- 2014: Mathrubhumi Literary Award
- 2014: Thoppil Bhasi Award
- 2017: O. N. V. Literary Award
- 2017: P. Kesavadev Literary Award
- 2019: Kadammanitta Ramakrishnan Award

=== Other awards ===
- 1986: Indira Priyadarshini Vriksha Mitra Award
- 2006: Panampilly Prathibha Puraskaram
- 2007: Streesakti Award
- 2007: K. Kunhirama Kurup Award
- 2009: M.T.Chandrasenan Award
