= T P Sundararajan =

Indian lawyer

T.P. Sundararajan
- Born: 20 April 1941; Ambasamudram, Tirunelveli, India
- Died: 17 July 2011 (aged 70); Trivandrum, Kerala
- Education: Government Law College, Trivandrum; IPS
- Occupation: Lawyer
- Family: Adv. T.K. Anandapadmanabhan (Nephew)

T.P. Sundararajan (20 April 1941 – 17 July 2011) was an Indian lawyer. Sundararajan was a born in the town of Ambasamudram in Tirunelveli district of Tamil Nadu. He was a prolific student and earned his Indian Police Service, IPS. He went on to graduate in law from Government Law College, Trivandrum. Early in his career he had held key positions in the national Intelligence Bureau and Ministry of Home Affairs.

== Life and education ==
He was born into an orthodox Tamil Brahmin Hindu family from Southern part of Tamil Nadu and living in Trivandrum, Kerala. Born to Seshalakshmi and T.K. Padmanabha Iyengar, he was the youngest of four children. He had one older brother and two older sisters. He was mentored by his father who was a school Headmaster from a very early age. He was prolific in Sanskrit, Tamil, Malayalam & English. He remained a bachelor throughout his life, living along with his brother TP Krishnan and his family. He was recruited into Indian Police Service, IPS on the basis of All India Services, IAS etc. Examination in 1963. He worked as an Indian Police Service, IPS for over 5 years in the State. He was the Assistant Director of Intelligence Bureau (India). He also worked in the Ministry of Home Affairs (India), Government of India. He later resigned from Ministry of Home Affairs, IPS to be closer to family and to take care of his ailing father. He enrolled as an advocate in 1970. He obtained his master's degree in Law (ML) majoring in Crimes and Torts. He also went on to obtain another master's degree in Law (LLM) in Constitutional Law and International Law.

== Academic career ==
Sundararajan taught law in Trivandrum for over 15 years as a part-time lecturer and as a visiting professor.

== Judicial career ==
Sundararajan's career as a lawyer spanned three decades. He practiced as an advocate in the Courts of Thiruvananthapuram, in the High Courts and in the Supreme Court of India. He was registered as an Advocate on Record of the Supreme Court of India. He was familiar with all branches of law at the Original, Trial, Appellate and Special-Leave Jurisdiction in all Courts and Tribunals. He has been on the panel of Advocates for the Canara Bank and Syndicate Bank. He fought on the side of Nalini Netto on the famous sexual harassment case in 1999, against Transport Minister Neelalohitadasan Nadar, when the former was the Transport Secretary, leading to the resignation of the latter, though Nadar was later acquitted in the case.

== Religion and belief ==
Sundararajan was known for his simple living and strong beliefs. His faith and belief in the foundation of ancient Hindu scriptures was remarkable. His devotion to Lord Padmanabha at Padmanabhaswamy Temple, Thiruvananthapuram was unshakable. It was oftentimes quoted that the Lord would only wake up to his smiling face. He was born in a higher upper middle class Tamil Brahmin scholarly family. Having learnt the Sanskrit texts and ancient philosophies from his parents at an early age, he held it his utmost duty to follow them in all circumstances. He would go days on a fast without water or food while continuing his routine seamlessly. He belonged to the Hindu subsect of Sri Vaishnavism, whose roots are based on the teachings of Bhagawad Ramanuja. Sundararajan maintained the austerities of a sage throughout his life in thought, discipline, simplicity and truth. He was well-versed and fluent in scriptures of Vedanta Desika as he was in Law.

== Later years, illness and death ==
Travel throughout India for professional and religious reasons coupled with religious austerities had weakened Sundararajan over the years. Although he had delegated his professional work to his junior and nephew T.K. Ananda Padmanabhan he was occasionally traveling despite ailing health. Rigorous fasting and being on a meager diet slowly lead him to his death. He suffered from fever for over a couple of days followed by a heart attack in the early hours of 17 July 2011 when he died amidst his family members.
