= D. Sreedevi =

Indian lawyer (1939-2018)

Justice D. Sreedevi
- Born: Damodaran Sreedevi; 28 April 1939; Chirayinkeezhu, Kingdom of Travancore, British India (present day Thiruvananthapuram, Kerala, India)
- Died: 5 March 2018 (aged 78); Kochi, Kerala, India
- Education: Government Law College, Thiruvananthapuram
- Occupations: Lawyer; Judge; Social activist
- Years active: 1984–2012
- Known for: Chairperson of Kerala Women's Commission
- Spouse: Adv. U. Balaji
- Children: Basant Balaji

Damodaran Sreedevi (28 April 1939 – 5 March 2018). was an Indian lawyer, judge and social activist from Kerala. She was the Chairperson of Kerala Women's Commission twice.

== Early life and education ==
D. Sreedevi was born in 1939 at Chirayinkeezhu, Thiruvananthapuram as a daughter of Damodaran and Janaki Amma, both teachers. After pre-graduation from NSS College, Thiruvananthapuram, she graduated from Sree Narayana College, Kollam, and later obtained her LL.B. from Government Law College, Thiruvananthapuram.

== Career ==
Sreedevi was enrolled as an advocate and began her practice in Thiruvananthapuram in 1962. She began her career in the lower judiciary in Kerala. In 1971 she was appointed the Munsiff at Kottarakkara in the Kerala Sub-ordinate Judicial Services. She was promoted as District & Sessions Judge in 1984. She was then elevated to the High Court of Kerala as a judge on 14 January 1997 and served in that position until her retirement on 28 April 2001.

== Chairperson of Kerala Women's Commission ==
She was nominated the Chairperson of Kerala Women's Commission on 21 March 2001 and continued until 12 May 2002, with T. Devi, Adv. Nafeesath Beevi, Adv. K. Santhakumari, Smt. P. K. Sainaba, Prof. P. Gowri and Prof. Monamma Kokkad as members of the commission. She once again became the chairperson of the commission for a term of 5 years from 2 March 2007 to 1 March 2012 with T. Devi, P.K.Sainaba, Rugmini Bhaskaran, Prof. Meenakshi Thampan (02-03-2007 to 15-07-2011) and Adv. Noorbeena Rasheed (16-08-2011 to 01-03-2012) as members.

According to M. C. Josephine, Justice Sreedevi's legal expertise was instrumental in ensuring justice to women in distress and her efforts are a model for others in women empowerment.

== Personal life ==
Sreedevi was married to U. Balaji, who was a well known advocate. In 2021, her son Basant Balaji was appointed as an additional judge of the High Court of Kerala.

== Autobiography ==
Sreedevi's autobiography is titled Aajanma Niyogam which translates to A Lifelong Mission.

== Awards ==
- The Akkamma Cheriyan Award for the Best Social Worker (2009).
- The Guru Vandanam Award instituted by Asan Institute.
- The P. N. Panicker Family Welfare Award

== Death ==
Sreedevi died suddenly on 5 March 2018 from liver failure. She was 78. She was under treatment for liver disease during her last days.
