= P. G. Ajithkumar =

Justice P. G. Ajithkumar

Judge of the Kerala High Court
- In office 20 October 2021 – 03 June 2025

Personal details
- Born: 4 June 1963 (age 63) Vayala
- Spouse: Rameswary V.N.
- Children: A.R. Athul, A.R. Amal
- Parents: Gopala Pillai (father); J Thankam (mother)
- Education: Government Law College, Thiruvananthapuram; Annamalai University
- Website: High Court of Kerala

Puthen Veedu Gopala Pillai Ajithkumar (പുത്തൻ വീട് ഗോപാല പിള്ള അജിത്ത്കുമാർ; born 4 June 1963) is an Indian judge who was a judge of Kerala High Court; the highest court in the Indian state of Kerala and in the Union territory of Lakshadweep. The High Court of Kerala is headquartered at Ernakulam, Kochi.

== Education and career ==
Ajithkumar obtained B.Sc. graduation from St John's College, Anchal, law degree from Government Law College, Thiruvananthapuram and post graduation from Annamalai University. He joined judicial service as Magistrate in 1991, was promoted as District Judge in 2011 and served as Deputy Director and Additional Director in the Kerala Judicial Academy and as Registrar (District Judiciary) in the High Court of Kerala. He was appointed to serve as an Additional Judge in the High Court on 20 October 2021 and became permanent from 31 July 2023.
