= Valiyavila =

- Location in Kerala, India
- Coordinates: 8°30′25″N 76°59′54″E
- Country: India
- State: Kerala
- District: Thiruvananthapuram

Languages
  - Official: Malayalam, English
- Time zone: UTC+5:30 (IST)
- PIN: 695006
- Telephone code: 0471
- Vehicle registration: KL-01
- Nearest city: Thiruvananthapuram

Valiyavila is a ward in Thiruvananthapuram Corporation, the capital city of the Indian state of Kerala is situated on the border between Thiruvananthapuram Taluk and Kattakada Taluk and is a major road junction connecting the two big Taluks.

== Geography ==
It is located at 8°30′25″N 76°59′54″E.

== Location ==
This place is located en route Peyad - Kattakada - Neyyar Dam. It is around 8 km from Thiruvananthapuram Central Central Railway Station (via Karamana) and around 10 km via Vazhuthacaud Pangode route or Vazhuthacaud Jagathy route. Valiyavila is well connected by bus services from both East Fort and Thampanoor bus stations in Thiruvananthapuram city.

== Landmark ==
Kundamankadavu Bridge, which crosses the Karamana River is located near Valiyavila. The bridge is more than 100 years old.

== Important Establishments ==
A sub post office(Thirumala), State Bank of India Valiyavila Branch, a saw mill, an animal husbandry centre, and an upper primary school are situated here.

== Valiyavila Shooting Incident ==
M. Brelvi (67), an ex-service man (retired Lieutenant Colonel) residing at Valiyavila opened fire at a group of people after an altercation related to giving side to his car at Valiyavila in Thiruvananthapuram. The incident happened near Valiyavila junction in the Poojappura police station limits around 9.15 p.m. on Wednesday night, 30 January 2014.

The incident was the result of a road rage leaving two persons injured after his car was blocked by an autorickshaw, shot two people Venkateswara Rao (47) and Manoj (35) with his revolver following a heated argument with some local people in Valiyavila. The man, allegedly in an inebriated condition, picked up a quarrel with the auto driver and locals there. He then went home to bring his service pistol and opened fire and fired three rounds at the crowd, police said. The crowd roughed him up, overpowered him, and managed to bring him under control. After the incident, the Police then arrived on the spot and the retired Army officer has landed in police custody for allegedly opening fire and took him into custody. He was taken to a hospital as he also suffered injuries. The two persons, who suffered bullet injuries, were rushed to hospital.

The injured were taken to the Government Medical College Hospital and subjected to emergency surgeries. The condition of Mr. Rao, who was shot in the abdomen with one bullet piercing through his stomach was serious, but he recovered while Mr. Manoj, who was injured in the right leg, was out of danger, according to available information. The Colonel was later arrested by the police. It is said that he was under the influence of alcohol at the time of incident.

"According to eye-witnesses, the ex-service man was travelling in a car and an autorickshaw allegedly blocked his way near Valiyavila junction. He had heated arguments with the auto driver and some locals who gathered there," a police official said. A case has been registered against him under IPC section 307 (attempt to murder) and Arms Act. He was later shifted to the Poojappura police station and is being interrogated, the sources said.

The crowd is then said to have manhandled Mr. Brelvi, who was shifted to the General Hospital from where the police have secured his custody. A case was also registered against some persons based on his complaint for manhandling him, the official added.

== Famous Personalities ==
- Kochu Preman, Actor
- Najim Arshad, Playback Singer and Music Director
- Mahalakshmi, Actress
