= Nalini Netto =

Indian administrative officer

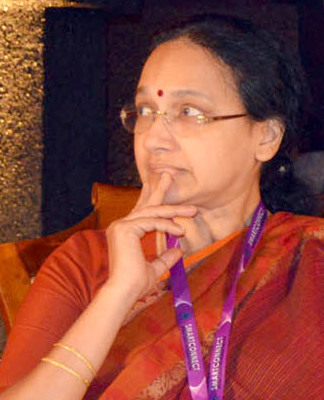

Chief Secretary, Government of Kerala
- In office April 2017 – August 2017
- Governor: P. Sathasivam
- Chief Minister: Pinarayi Vijayan
- Preceded by: S. M. Vijayanand IAS
- Succeeded by: Dr. K. M. Abraham IAS

Personal details
- Born: 19 August 1957 (age 69) Thiruvananthapuram, Kerala
- Spouse: Desmond Netto IPS
- Education: University of Kerala
- Occupation: Bureaucrat

Nalini Netto is a retired officer of the Indian Administrative Service. She served as State Chief Secretary and took office on 1 April 2017, from incumbent S. M. Vijayanand. She is the 42nd head and 4th women head of the state bureaucracy. Before becoming the chief secretary she had been in the post of Chief Electoral Officer and Home secretary. Nalini Netto was in news when she filed a case against the Transport minister Neelalohithadasan Nadar in 2000 when she was the Transport Secretary.

== Personal life ==
Nalini Netto was born in 1957 at Thiruvananthapuram, Kerala to Professor T.S. Ramakrishnan and Chandra Ramakrishnan. Nalini's brother Mohan is an Indian Revenue Service officer. Her husband Desmond Netto is a retired IPS officer in Kerala. Her cousin Girija Vaidyanathan was Chief Secretary of Tamil Nadu

Netto holds a bachelor's degree and a master's degree in Chemistry from the University of Kerala.

== Career ==
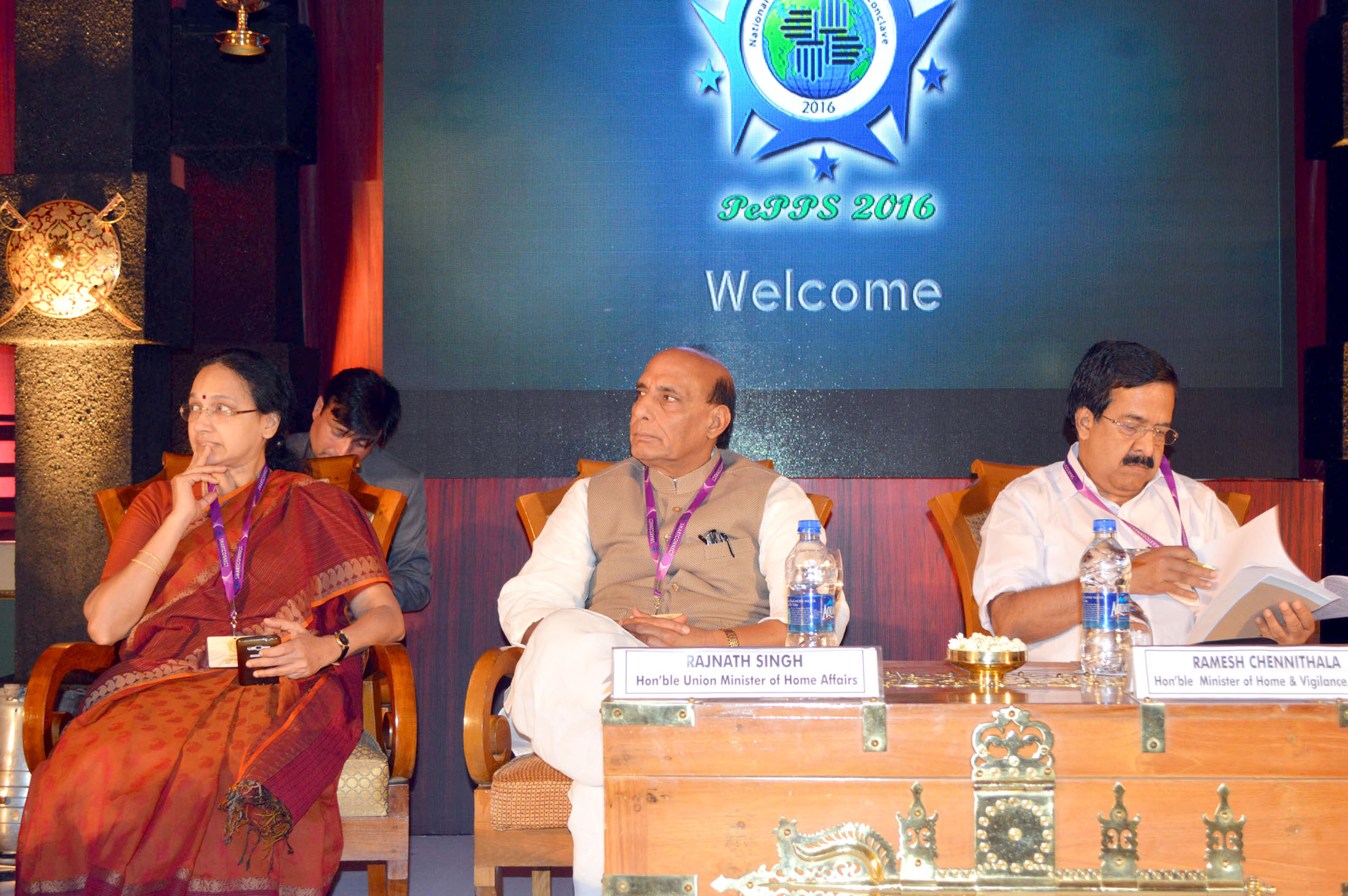
Nalini Netto(left)

In her long career, Nalini Netto has held key posts including the State, starting from 1981, as Tourism Secretary, Irrigation Secretary and District Collector of Thiruvananthapuram. She was then made the Transport Secretary in 1999. Later, Nalini became the first woman to hold the office of the Chief Electoral Officer (CEO). Then, she served as the CEO for 11 years. Nalini Netto became the Additional Chief Secretary in 2014. She became Chief Secretary in April 2017. She retired in August 2017. After retirement, she was appointed as Chief Principal Secretary of Chief Minister of Kerala, Pinarayi Vijayan. She resigned from the post in March 2019 citing personal reasons.

== Sexual harassment case ==
In 1999, Nalini, who was the Transport Secretary then, boldly reacted to alleged sexual harassment by Transport Minister Neelalohitadasan Nadar, leading to the resignation of the latter. Though Nadar was later acquitted in the case, the IAS officer sent out a strong message by pursuing the case against the politician. T P Sundararajan, a retired Intelligence bureaucrat turned law professor, was the one who fought the case for her. Before this incident Nadar was penalized for a similar case filed in by the forest officer Prakriti Srivastava.
