= N. Anil Kumar =

Indian judge

Hon'ble Justice N. Anil Kumar
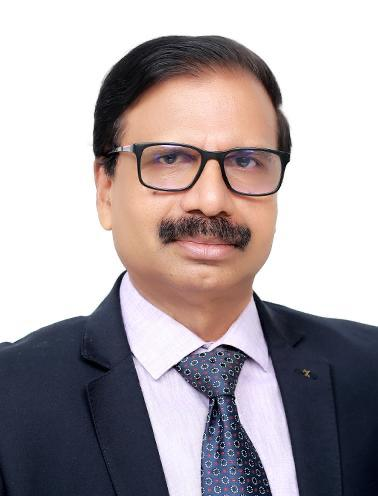

Judge of Kerala High Court
- In office 05 November 2018 – 02 December 2021

Registrar General of Kerala High Court
- In office January 2018 – November 2018

Principal District and Sessions Judge of Ernakulam District
- In office 2016–2018

Personal details
- Born: 3 December 1959 (age 66) Kerala, India
- Citizenship: Indian
- Education: N.S.S. College, Nilamel; Government Law College, Thiruvananthapuram
- Alma mater: Government Law College, Thiruvananthapuram
- Website: High Court of Kerala

N. Anil Kumar is a retired judge of the Kerala High Court. The Kerala High Court, headquartered at Ernakulam, Kochi, is the highest court in the Indian state of Kerala and in the Union Territory of Lakshadweep.

== Early life and education ==
Anil Kumar was born on 03.12.1959. He completed his graduation from N.S.S. College, Nilamel and obtained a law degree from Govt. Law College, Thiruvananthapuram. Justice Kumar is an alumnus of Government High School Kilimanoor.

== Career ==
He enrolled as an Advocate in 1983 and started practicing in Thiruvananthapuram. In 1991 he joined Kerala Civil Judicial Service as Munsiff, served as Sub Judge from 2001 to 2004, appointed as the Chief Judicial Magistrate of Ernakulam District in 2004. In 2005 he was promoted as District and Sessions Judge. Thereafter, he served as Special Judge - CBI, Ernakulam, Judge, Motor Accident Claims Tribunal, Kollam, Additional District and Sessions Judge, Mavelikkara, Legal Advisor and Disciplinary Enquiry Officer, KSEB from 2010 to 2013, Principal District and Sessions Judge, Ernakulam, Registrar General, High Court of Kerala from where he was elevated as Additional Judge of High Court of Kerala on 05.11.2018. Justice N. Anil Kumar was appointed as Permanent judge of the High Court of Kerala with effect from 14.9. 2020. Justice Anilkumar demitted his office upon attaining age of superannuation on 2 December 2021.

During his long career as District Judge, Justice N Anil Kumar pronounced verdicts on sensational murder cases such as Perumbavoor Jisha Murder case and Chengannur Bhaskara Karanavar Murder Case. Ameerul Islam, a migrant labourer from Assam, was convicted for the rape and murder in Ernakulam of Dalit law student Jisha by Ernakulam Principal Sessions Court Judge N.Anil Kumar on December 12, 2017. In the judgment, the judge specifically mentioned the use of scientific methods to prove the case. On May 20, 2024, a Division Bench of the Kerala High Court upheld the death sentence awarded to Ameerul Islam, the lone convict in the 2016 case of rape and murder of Jisha.

Earlier on June 10, 2010, all the four accused in the Bhaskara Karanavar murder case were convicted of the charges, including murder and conspiracy, by the Mavelikara Additional Sessions (Fast Track) Court judge N. Anil Kumar. The life sentence awarded to all the four accused by the trial court was confirmed by the high court. Although Sherin had filed a special-leave petition in the Supreme Court, Justice S A Bobde and Justice L Nageswara Rao dismissed the petition and confirmed the life sentence.

== Post Retirement Positions ==
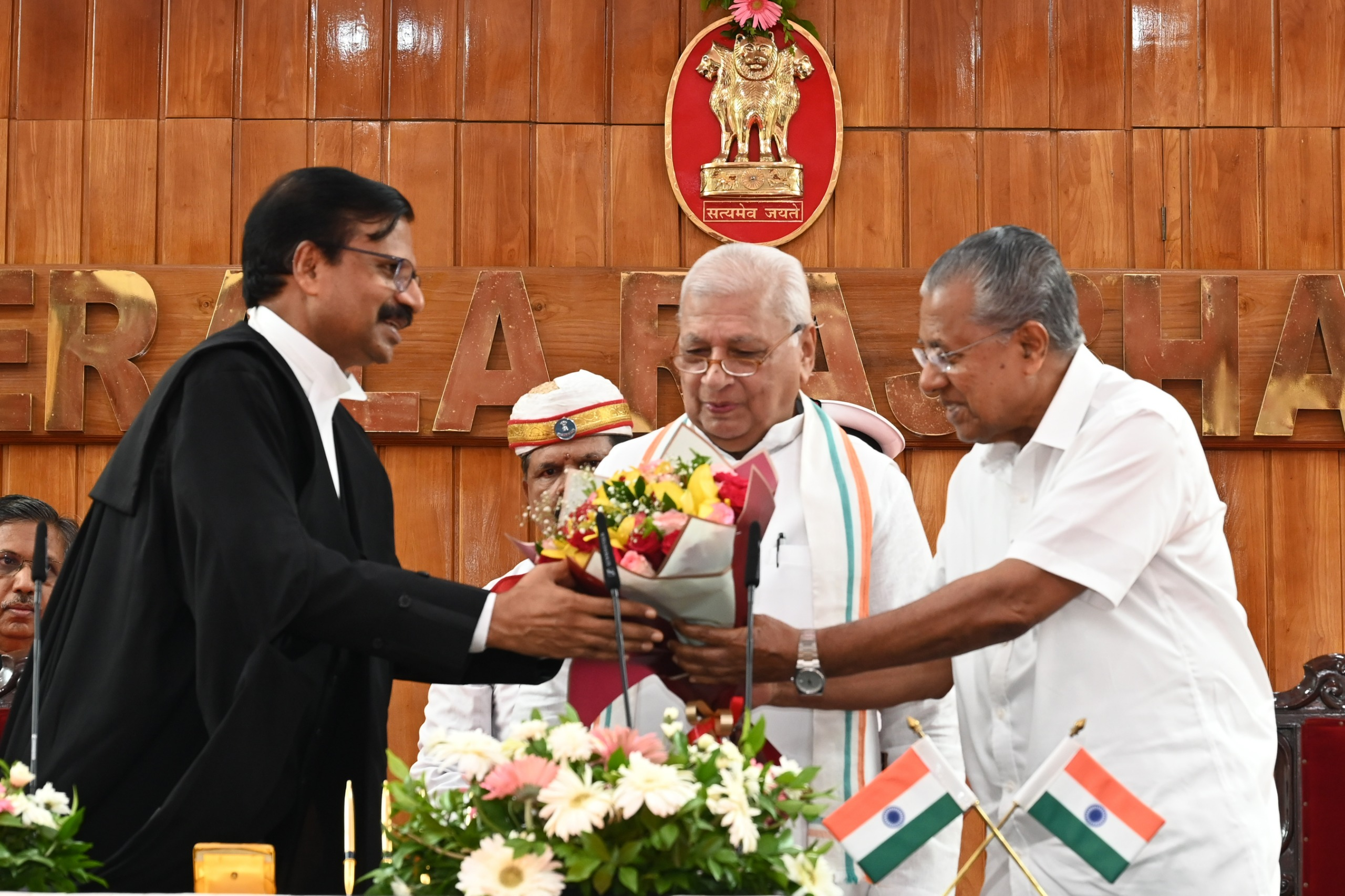
Justice N Anil Kumar sworn in as the Sixth Lok Ayukta of Kerala

The state government reorganized the Kerala Anti-Social Activities (Prevention) Act (KAAPA) advisory board and appointed Justice N Anil Kumar as its new chairman on 16 February 2022. Since 3 April 2024, in addition to the duties of Chairman, KAAPA, Justice N. Anil Kumar also serves as the Chairman, Advisory Board for Conservation of Foreign Exchange and Prevention of Smuggling Activities Act (COFEPOSA), Prevention of Illicit Traffic in Narcotics Drugs and Psychotropic Substances (PIT NDPS) Act and National Security Act (NSA). Justice N Anil Kumar was sworn in as the sixth Lok Ayukta of Kerala State on August 21, 2024.
