= R. Sankara Narayanan Thampi =

Indian politician

R. Sankara Narayana Thampi

Speaker of the Kerala Legislative Assembly
- In office 1957–1959
- Preceded by: Office established
- Succeeded by: K. M. Seethi Sahib

Member of the Kerala Legislative Assembly
- In office 1957–1959
- Preceded by: Constituency created
- Succeeded by: T. Kunjukrishna Pillai
- Constituency: Chengannur

Member of the Travancore-Cochin Legislative Assembly
- In office 1954–1956
- Constituency: Mavelikkara

Personal details
- Born: 30 September 1911
- Died: 2 November 1989 (aged 78)

R. Sankara Narayana Thampi (30 September 1911 – 2 November 1989) was a freedom fighter, Indian National Congress member, Communist Party of India member, and activist who was born in Alleppey. He served as the First Speaker of the Kerala Legislative Assembly from April 1957 to July 1959.

Preceded by None	Speaker of Kerala Legislative Assembly; 1957– 1959	Succeeded by Seethi Sahib
