= Palakkad North =

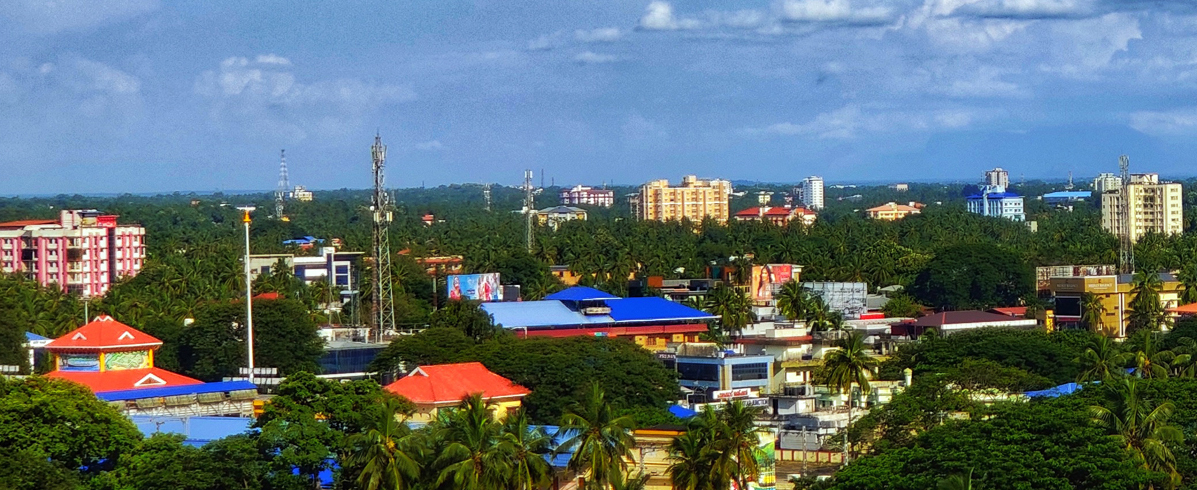
- Palakkad city view from Puthupariyaram
- Interactive map of Palakkad North
- Coordinates: 11.14135°N 75.82970°E
- Country: India
- State: Kerala
- Demonym: Palakkadan

Language
  - Official: Malayalam
- Time zone: UTC+5:30 (IST)
- Area code: +91-(0)491
- Vehicle registration: KL-09

Palakkad North is a region in Palakkad city consisting of the northern suburbs of the city. These areas can be treated as both commercial and residential areas of the city. Many of the institutions of the city forms part of Palakkad North. There is a North Police Station located on Market Road, Vadakkanthara. The Palakkad North Police Station was formed and opened in the year 1913.

== Suburbs ==
- Akathethara
- Ayyapuram
- Fort Maidan
- Jainamedu
- Kallekkad
- Kallekulangara
- Kalpathy
- Melamuri
- Mepparamba
- Mundur
- Olavakkode
- Pirayiri
- Puthuppariyaram
- Puthur
- Railway Colony
- Sekharipuram
- Vadakkanthara

== Facilities ==
Map view of facilities in and around Palakkad

== Things to do ==
Map view of things to do in and around palakkad

== See also ==
- Palakkad South
