= List of educational institutions in Palakkad district =

Palakkad District is one of the main centre of education in Kerala state India. Palakkad District has Prominent Educational Institutions provide platform for various level of education . The district is home to the only Indian Institute of Technology in Kerala state. Palakkad District has three educational districts namely Palakkad, Ottappalam and Mannarkkad. There are several educational institutions working across the district. Government Victoria College, Palakkad, Government Engineering College, Sreekrishnapuram, NSS College of Engineering, Government Medical College, Palakkad, Chembai Memorial Government Music College, and many more higher level of educational institutions are located in Palakkad District.

Government Victoria College, Palakkad, established in 1866, is one of the oldest colleges in the state. The Government Medical College, Palakkad is started in 2014 is the first Government medical college in the district. The NSS College of Engineering at Akathethara, is the Fourth Engineering Institution established in Kerala, India. The Chembai Memorial Government Music College is one of the main centres of excellence in teaching carnatic music in the state. The Mercy College, Palakkad a women's college established in 1964 is one of the familiar institution in Palakkad city.

== Engineering Colleges ==
- Indian Institute of Technology Palakkad
- Government Engineering College Sreekrishnapuram
- Ammini College of Engineering, Kannampariyaram
- NSS College of Engineering
- al ameen college of engineering

== Arts and Science Colleges ==
- Government Victoria College, Palakkad
- Government College Chittur
- V V College of Science and Technology, Kanjikode
- NSS College, Nenmara
- SN College, Alathur
- Sadanam Kumaran College, Pathiripala
