= Chandranagar, Palakkad =

Chandranagar
- Suburb
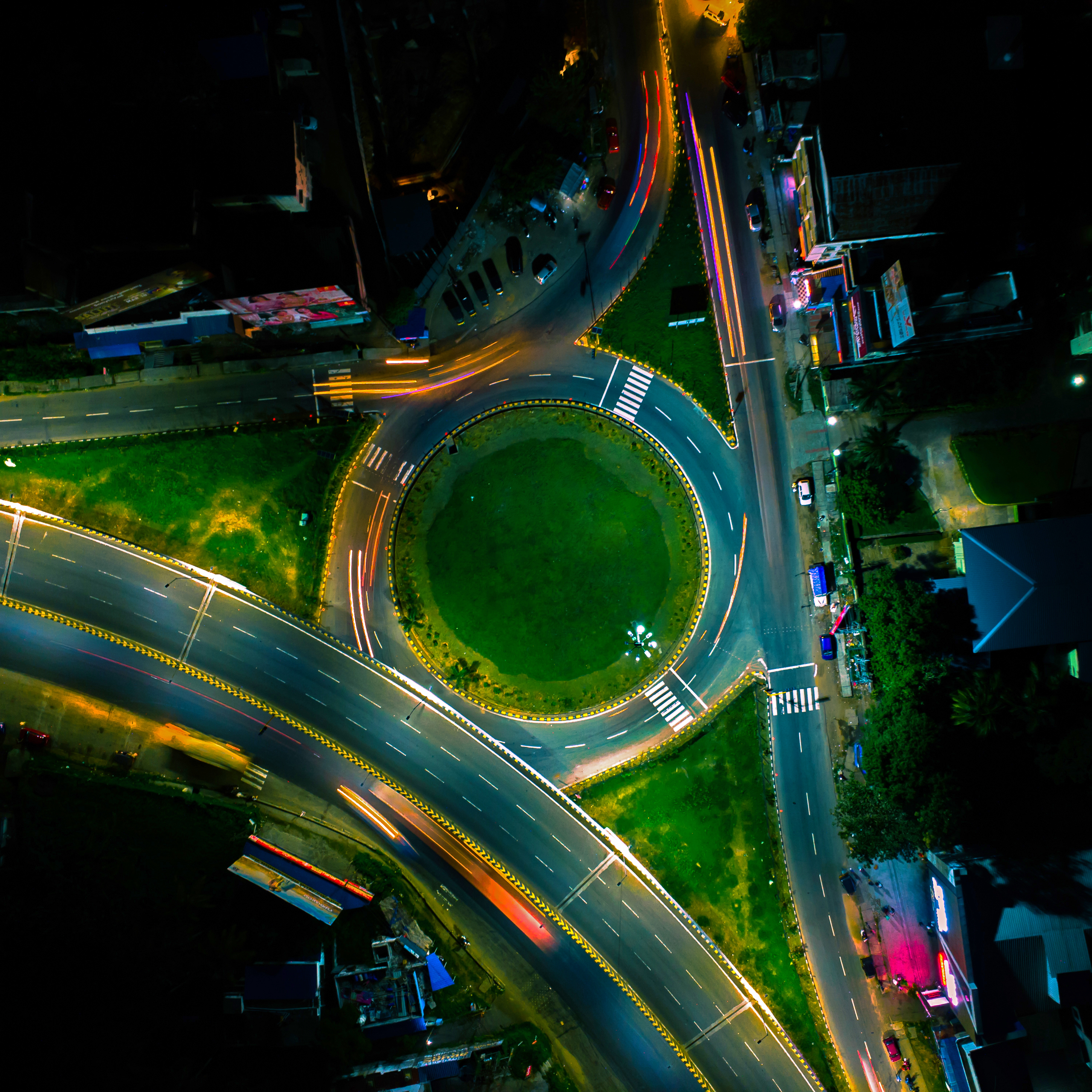
- Chandranagar roundabout
- Interactive map of Chandranagar
- Coordinates: 10.772770°N 76.6803000°E
- Country: India
- State: Kerala
- District: Palakkad

Government
  - Body: Marutharode Panchayat

Languages
  - Official: Malayalam, English
- Time zone: UTC+5:30 (IST)
- PIN: 678007
- Vehicle registration: KL- 09
- Parliament constituency: Palakkad
- Assembly constituency: Malampuzha

Chandranagar is a commercial and residential area in Palakkad city, Kerala, India. Chandranagar housing Society, founded in 1956, is the first housing colony in the state and one of the largest.

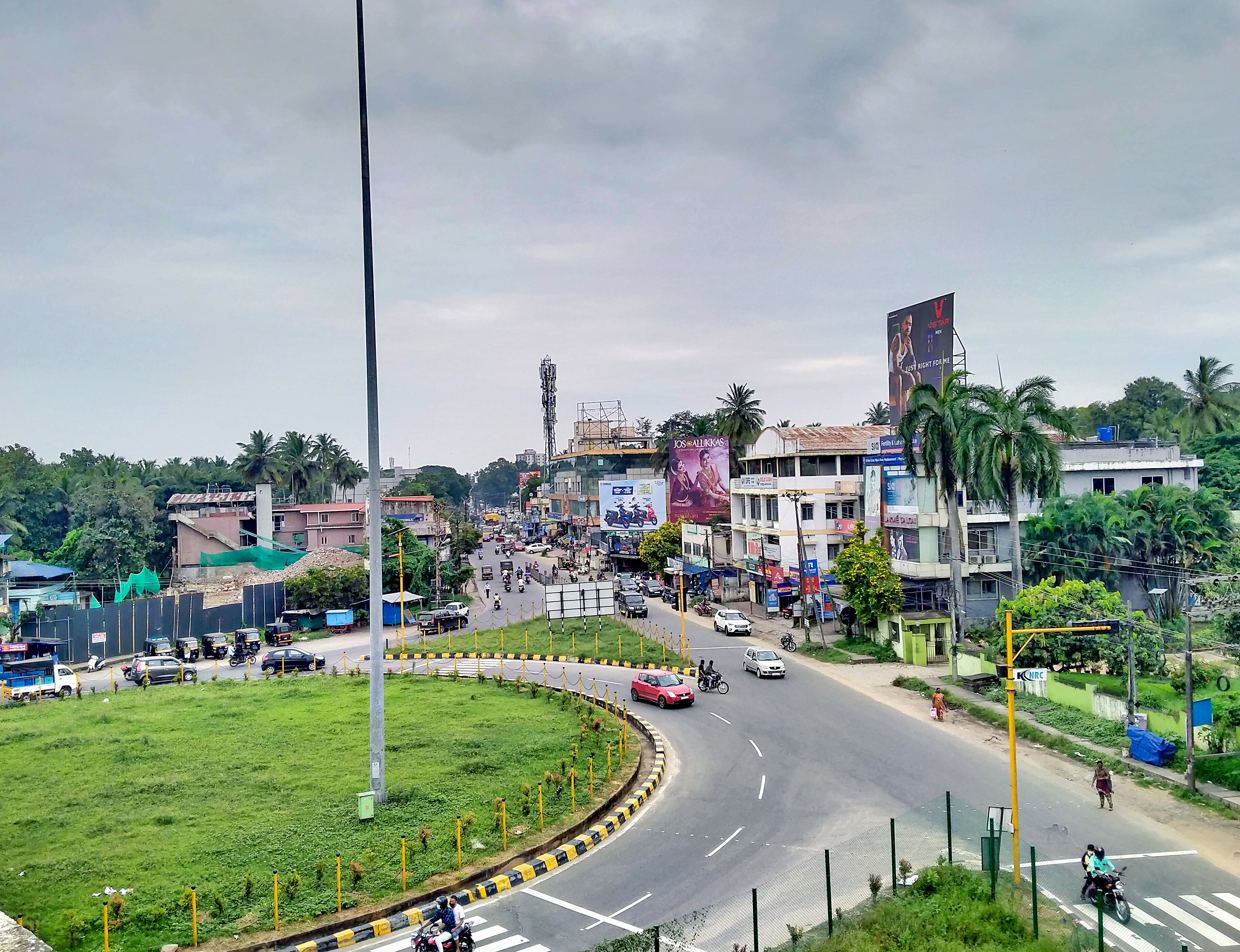
Chandranagar Roundabout

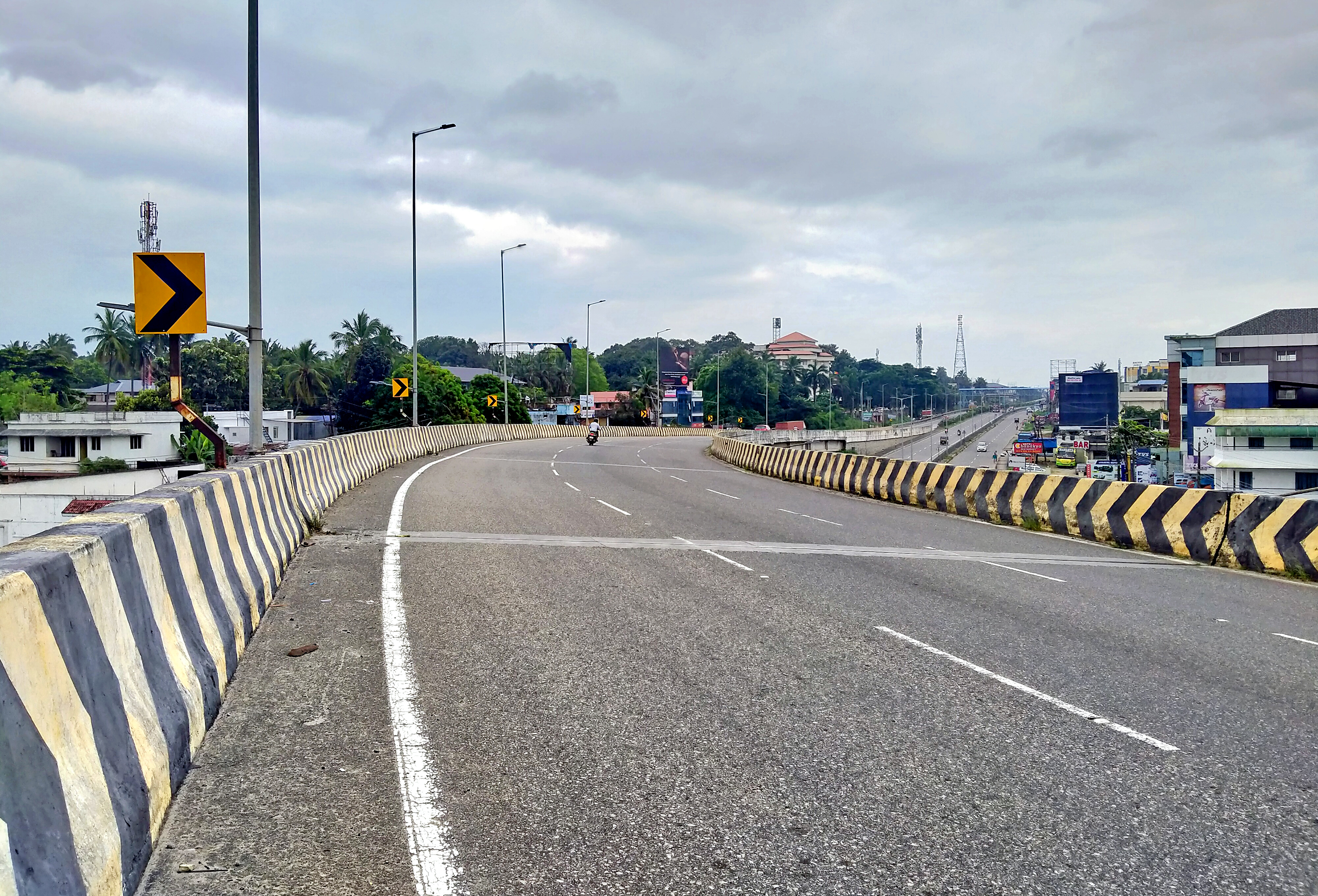
Chandranagar flyover

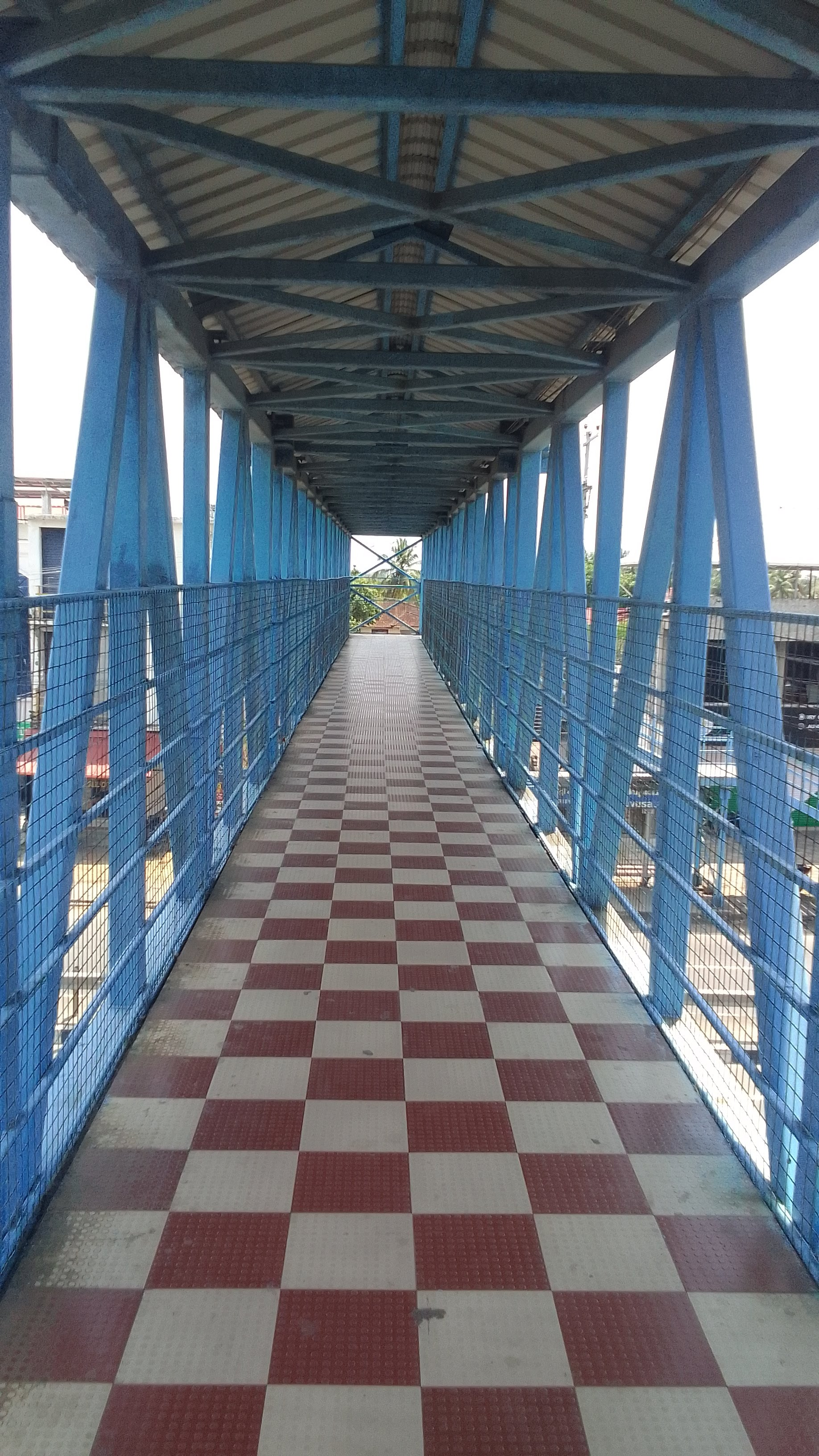
Walkbridge

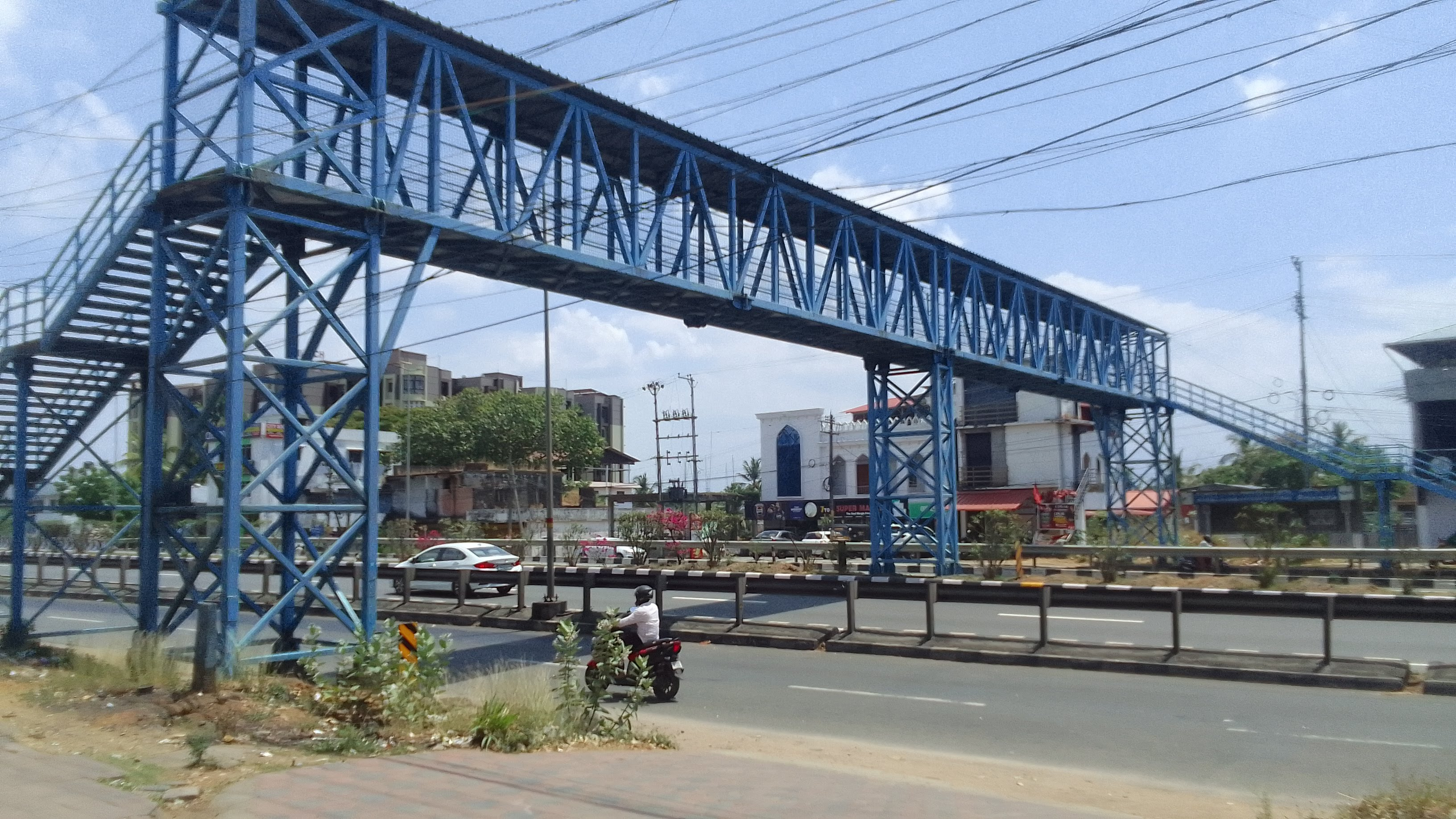
Walkbridge
