= Economy of Palakkad =

The economy of Palakkad is driven by the proximity of Palakkad to Coimbatore, and the presence of the Palakkad Gap providing an effective overland trading route. Palakkad is the second largest industrial hub in the Indian state of Kerala, after Kochi. Before becoming industrially important, business and commerce were the main kinds of engagement in the city. In August 2024, city was included in the upcoming 12 industrial smart cities of India.

== Commerce ==
Palakkad was declared a city in 1866 by the governor of Madras. Before establishing itself, Palakkad had greater roots in commerce. There are specialised streets for different amenities. Market Road is one of the main roads dedicated to trade and business. It was the major commercial area that belonged to the Palakkattussery Kingdom. At present, the commercialization of the city is picking up, and the suburbs are witnessing growth.

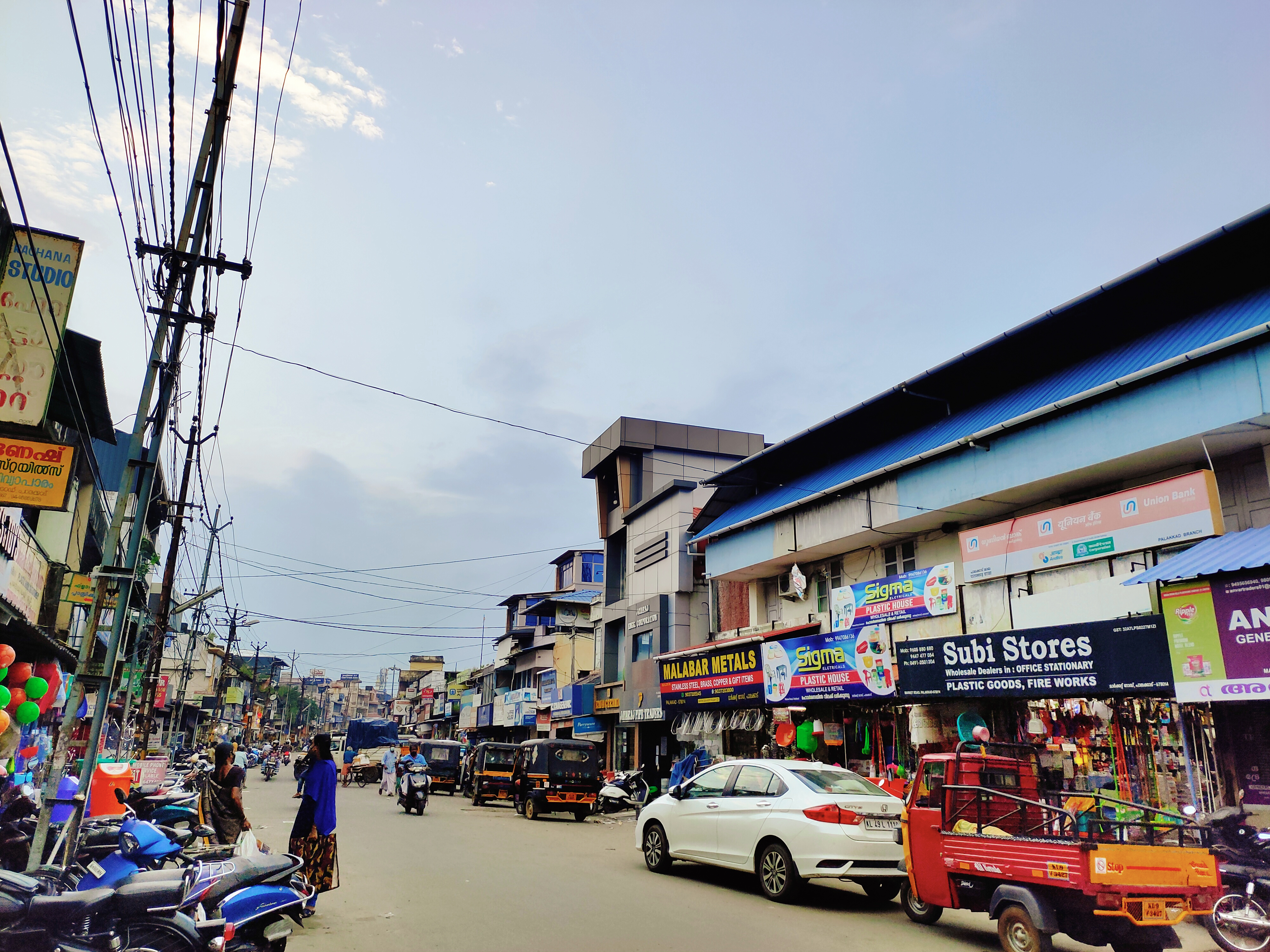
Market Road

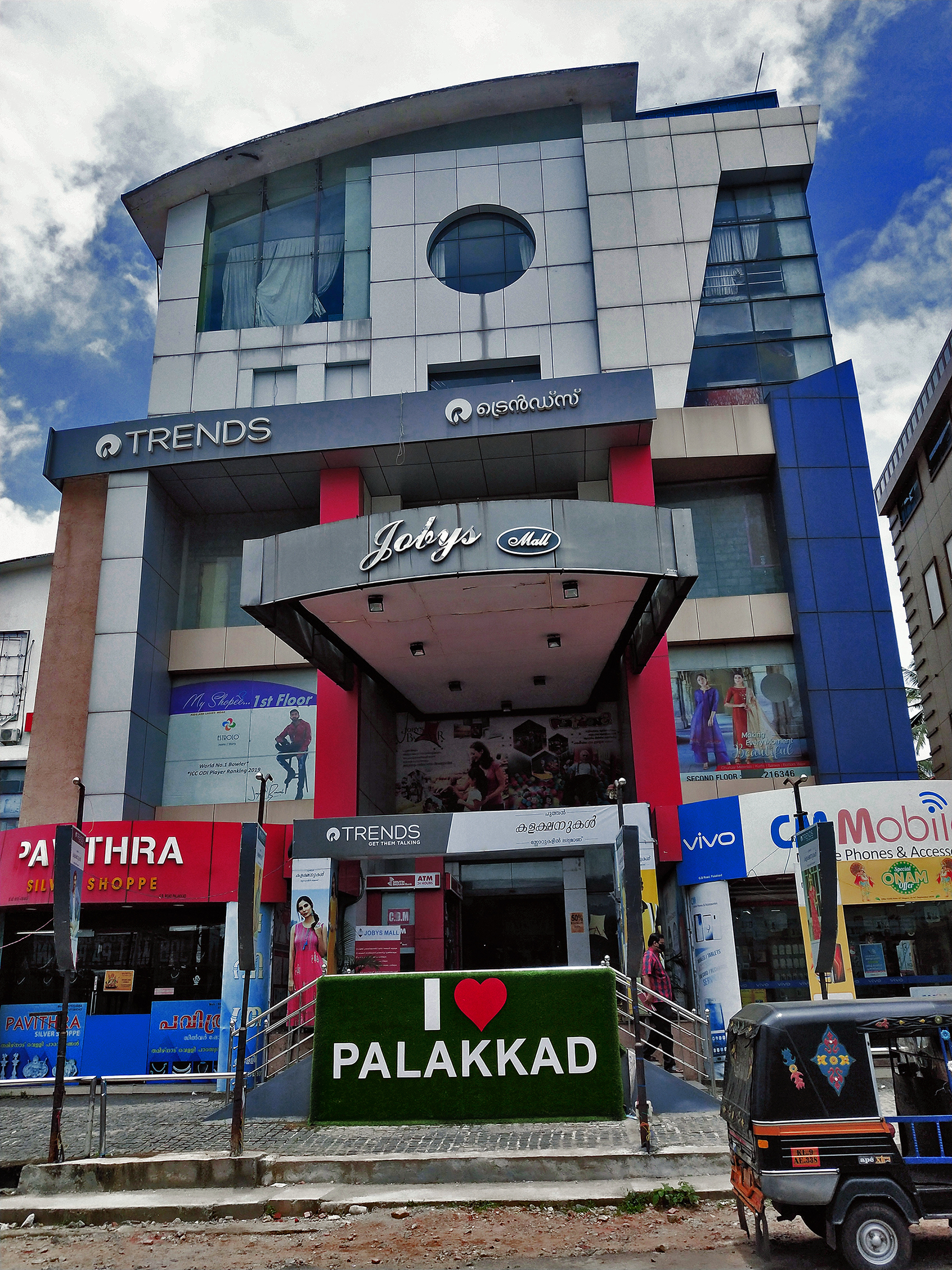
Joby's Mall, first mall in Palakkad

== Tourism ==
Palakkad is a green city, and tourism is one of the major activities in the city. Palakkad Fort, situated in the heart of the city, is the major tourist destination in the district. Malampuzha Dam, the second largest dam and reservoir in the state of Kerala, is located nearly 14 km from the city, and is another destination. Kalpathy is another destination famous for traditional houses in lanes, which is the first heritage village in the state. Palakkad has a bright future in the field of tourism in the coming years.

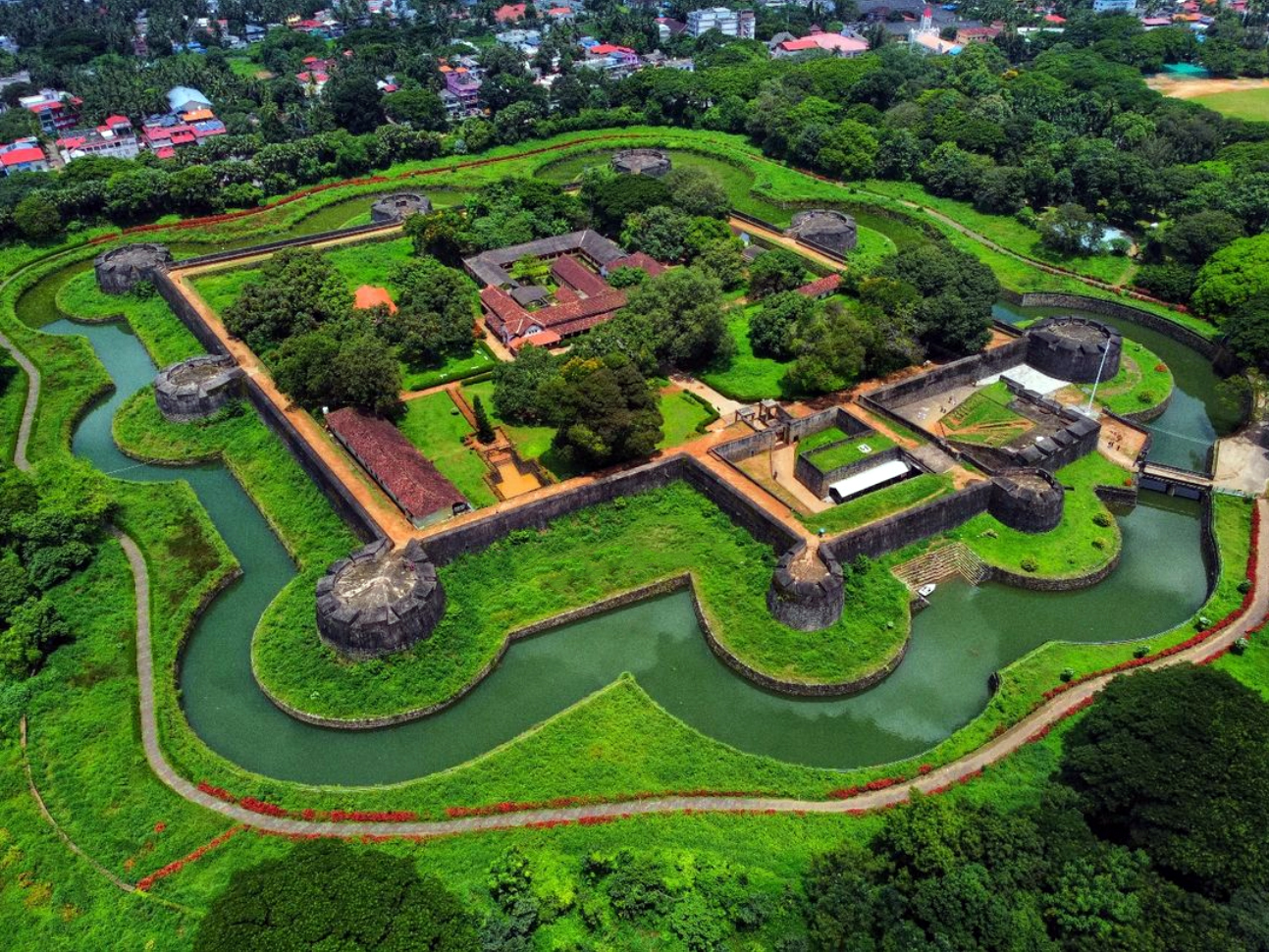
An aerial view of Palakkad Fort

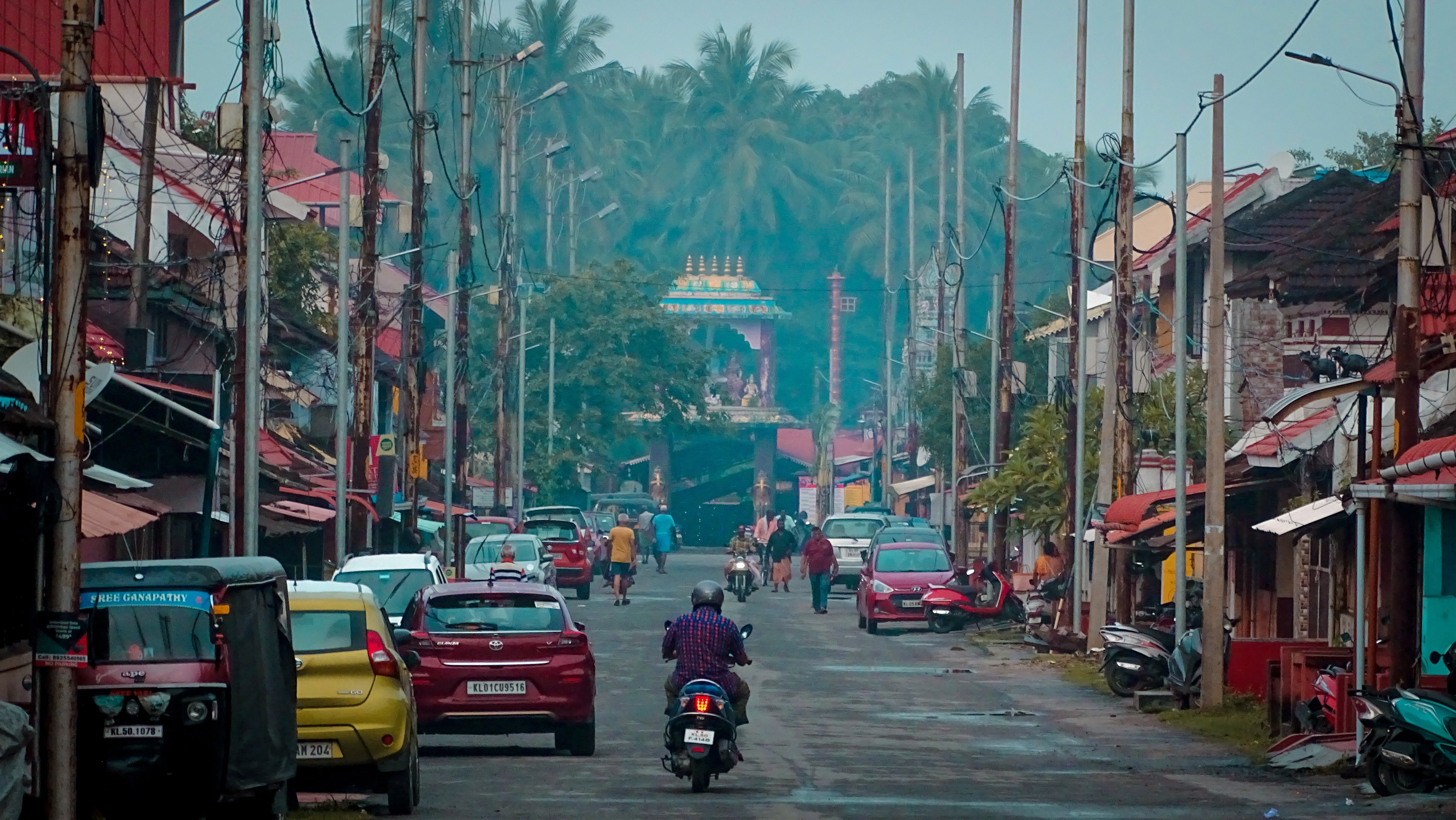
A street in Kalpathy

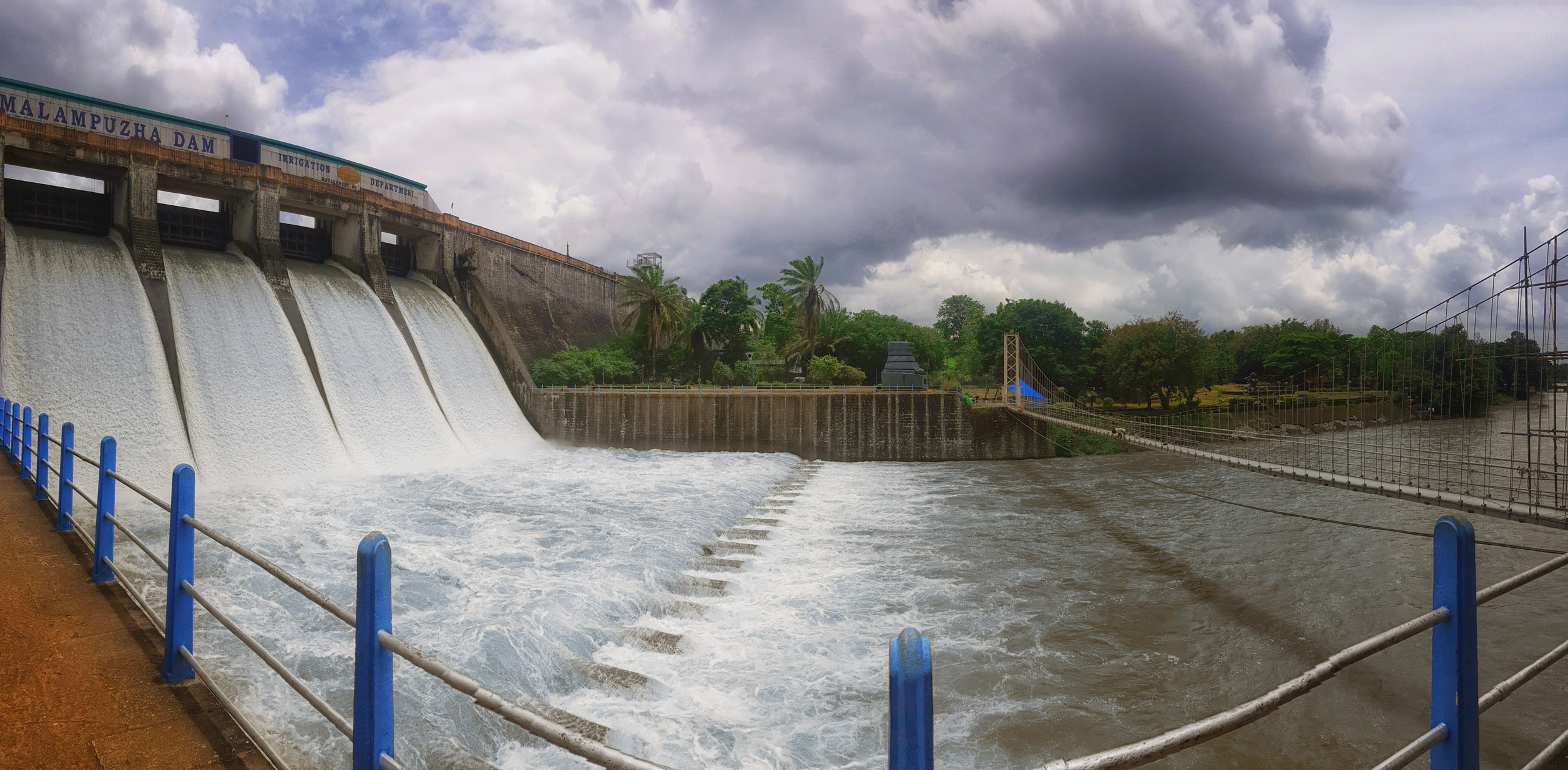
Malampuzha Dam

== Telecommunication ==
British Physical Laboratories (BPL) was established in 1963 in the city. It had operational manufacturing units for laboratory equipment and telecommunication equipment. Indian Telephone Industries Limited opened its fifth plant in Kanjikode in 1956, responsible for data handling with the assembly and personalisation of smart cards and electronic manufacturing facilities for PCB's, HDPE pipes, smart energy metres, micro PCs under the Smart City Mission, etc. It also produces information and communication technology (ICT) equipment such as network management systems, encryption and networking for internet connectivity, secure communications networks, and defence equipment.

== Manufacturing ==
One of the major control valve manufacturers under the Ministry of Heavy Industries, Instrumentation Limited has its unit, started in 1974 in collaboration with M/s Yamatake Honeywell co.Ltd., Japan, the world renowned leader in process control instrumentation including final control elements like control valves and plays a vital support role for a very wide spectrum of industrial enterprises – ranging from core sector establishments such as steel, power, cement and oil refineries to large medium and even small scale industries.

Fluid Control Research Institute is also an institute under the same ministry dedicated to Fluids Engineering in South East Asia for R&D on flow products, Testing and Calibration of Valves, flow meters and other measuring instruments as per ISO requirements, model approval Tests, software for design and selection of flow meters/valves and specialised training programmes and more on the various facilities viz., Water flow Lab, Air Flow Lab, Oil Flow Laboratory and other auxiliary laboratories.

Saint-Gobain SEFPRO, a group belonging to the Innovative Materials division of Saint-Gobain, a French multinational corporation, has their first and one of the two plants in India in Kanjikode and serves a wide range of glass industry markets, from container, flat, and specialty glass to tableware and fibreglass.

== Heavy Vehicle ==
Bharat Earth Movers Limited (BEML), a Miniratna company supplying products, services, and support to defence and aerospace, mining and construction, and rail and metro for clientele within India and around the globe, is the second-largest manufacturer of earthmoving equipment. Its fourth complex is here. The plant was set up to cater to the requirements of the Defence Ministry and Indian Railways.Since inauguration the Palakkad complex has supplied 150 Rail coach Shells and Bogie Frames and 500 HMV Trucks.

== Oxygen ==
Inox Air Products has its plant here, which is the sole producer of liquid oxygen and the biggest producer of oxygen in Kerala. It produces 149 tonnes of medical oxygen daily and has a storage capacity of 1,000 ns. Sri Venkateswara Oxygen Pvt. Ltd. is another one that meets the 80% requirement of industrial oxygen in the state and also produces medical oxygen cylinders for hospital purposes.

== Petroleum ==
Bottling plant of Hindustan Petroleum Corporation Limited (HPCL) is located in Kanjikode. LPG storage and bulk dispatch terminals of Bharat Petroleum Corporation Limited (BPCL) are also present.

== Pharmaceutical ==
Arya Vaidya Pharmacy Coimbatore (AVP), one of the major dealers of ayurvedic medical science, has its major and largest medicine manufacturing unit in Kanjikode. Kottakkal Arya Vaidya Sala, another major dealer of ayurvedic medical science, also has a manufacturing unit. There are also a number of pharmaceuticals located here related to allopathic medicine.

== KINFRA Park ==
Kerala Industrial Infrastructure Development Corporation (KINFRA) has their Integrated Industrial and Textile Park in Kanjikode with a number of companies functioning inside. KINFRA's one of the major projects in the state, the Mega Food Park is also located here.

== Textile ==
Kerala Industrial Infrastructure Development Corporation (KINFRA) has a textile park in Kanjikode. Precot Meridian, one of the largest dealers of cotton in South India has their manufacturing units. Some other industries related to textile are also functioning in the same area.

== Steel ==
There are a number of large and medium iron and steel industries which are mainly concentrated along Kanjikode Para road.

== Cement ==
Malabar Cements Limited is a major cement company in Kerala, contributing to 10% of the cement production in the state. It is owned by the Government of Kerala and has its headquarters and major unit of manufacturing in Walayar.

== Others ==
Large and medium industries related to plastic, rubber, polymers, batteries, and various commodities are also situated in Kanjikode.

== Recent Developments ==
City was included in the list of the upcoming 12 Industrial Smart Cities of the country. It was announced as a part of the upcoming Kochi-Bengaluru Industrial Corridor. This project is expected to boost the economy of the city as well as the entire state.
