= Muttikulangara =

- Suburb
- Interactive map of Muttikulangara
- Coordinates: 10.803631°N 76.622086°E
- Country: India
- State: Kerala
- District: Palakkad

Government
  - Body: Puthuppariyaram Panchayat

Languages
  - Official: Malayalam, English
- Time zone: UTC+5:30 (IST)
- PIN: 678594
- Vehicle registration: KL-9
- Parliament constituency: Palakkad
- Assembly constituency: Malampuzha

Muttikulangara is a suburb of Palakkad city, Kerala, India. It is located about 9 km from the city centre along National Highway 966. Muttikulangara is famous for its ayurvedic oil, which is used to get relief from cuts, wounds, sprains, and fractures. The Kerala Armed Police Second Battalion was founded in Muttikulangara in 1974.
