= Ayyapuram =

Village in Kerala, India

- Neighbourhood
- Location in Kerala, India Ayyapuram (India) Ayyapuram (Asia)
- Coordinates: 10.789230°N 76.650530°E
- Country: India
- State: Kerala
- District: Palakkad

Government
  - Body: Palakkad Municipality

Languages
  - Official: Malayalam, English
- Time zone: UTC+5:30 (IST)
- PIN: 678010
- Telephone code: 0491
- Vehicle registration: KL-9
- Lok Sabha constituency: Palakkad
- Climate: hot and humid (Köppen)

Ayyapuram is an area in Palakkad city,Kerala, India. The area derives its name from the Ayyappan temple that is located nearby. History is that the whole area belonged to this temple.Ayyapuram is wards 4 and 15 of Palakkad Municipality.

There are 3 temples in this area. One Ayyappan temple, one Panchali (Draupadi) amman temple and one Mariyamman temple. A temple for Panchali is a rarity.

There is a colony nearby which has also been named after Lord Ayyappa - Sasthapuri, where some 35 houses have been built and some 150 people live.
