= Palakkad =

City in Kerala, India

Palakkad Palghat
- City
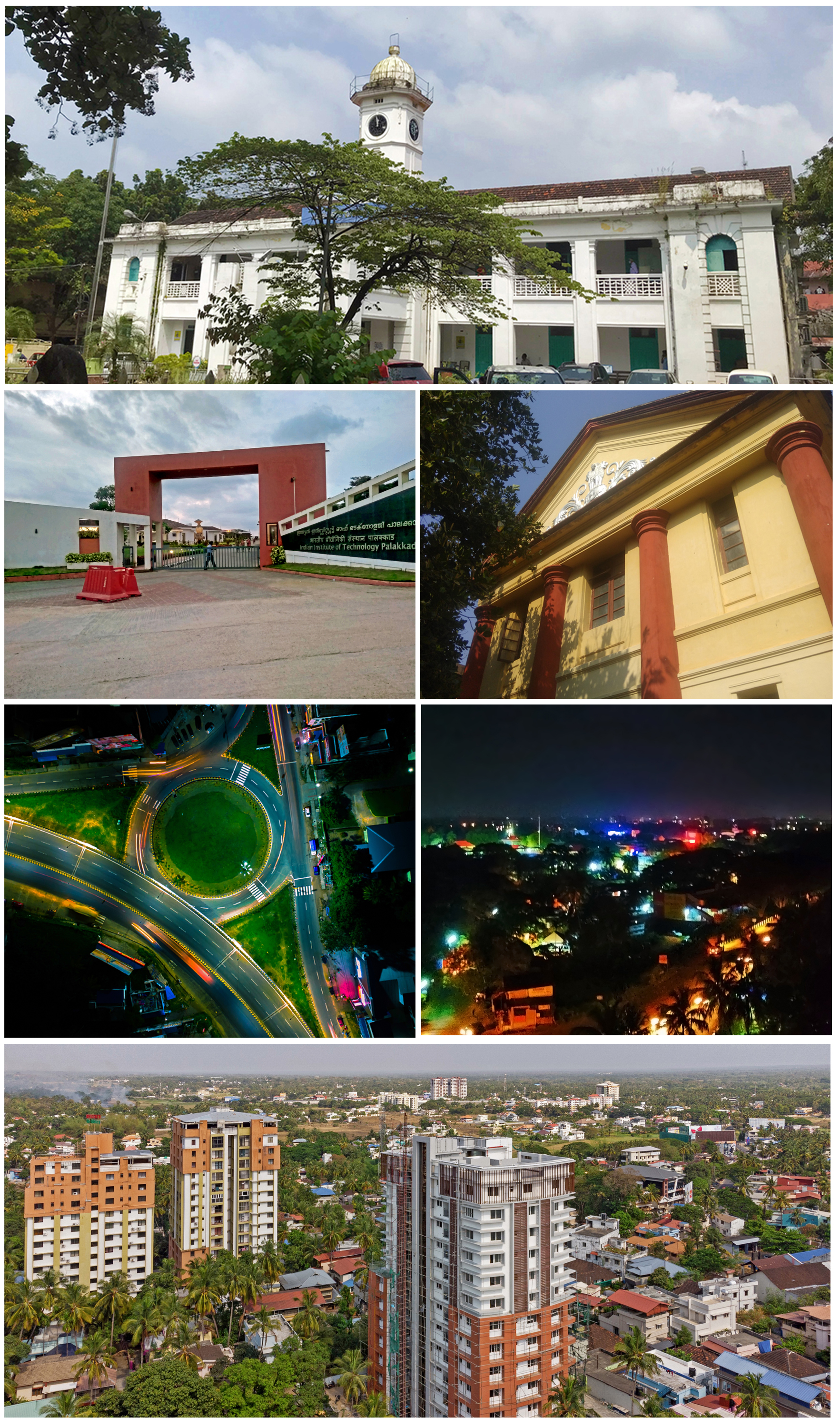
- From top Left to Right : Palakkad Municipal Office, IIT Palakkad, Government Victoria College, Palakkad, Chandranagar roundabout, Night view of Palakkad, Skyline of Palakkad
- Nickname: Gateway of Kerala
- Location within Kerala Location within India
- Coordinates: 10.775°N 76.651°E
- Country: India
- State: Keralam
- Region: South Malabar
- District: Palakkad
- Municipality: 1866

Government
  - Type: Municipal council
  - Body: Palakkad Municipality
  - Chairperson: P. Smithesh (BJP)
  - Deputy Chairperson: T. Baby (BJP)
  - MLA: Ramesh Pisharody (INC)

Area
  - City: 26.60 km^{2} (10.27 sq mi)
  - Metro: 123.32 km^{2} (47.61 sq mi)
- Elevation: 84 m (276 ft)

Population (2011)
  - City: 130,955
  - Density: 4,923/km^{2} (12,750/sq mi)
  - Metro: 293,533
- Demonym: Palakkadan

Language
  - Official: Malayalam
- Time zone: UTC+5:30 (IST)
- Postal Index Number: 678 XXX
- Area code: +91-(0)491
- Vehicle registration: KL-09
- Climate: Am/Aw (Köppen)
- Website: palakkadmunicipality.lsgkerala.gov.in/en

Palakkad (Malayalam: [pɐːlɐkːɐːɖɨ̆]), also known as Palghat, historically known as Palakkattussery, is a city in the Indian state of Kerala. It is the administrative headquarters of Palakkad district. Palakkad is the most densely populated municipality and the fourth-most densely populated city in the state. It was established before Indian independence under British rule and known by the name Palghat. Palakkad is famous for the ancient Palakkad Fort, which is in the heart of the city and was captured and rebuilt by Hyder Ali in 1766 which later fell into the hands of Zamorin in 1784. The city is about 347 kilometres (216 mi) northeast of the state capital, Thiruvananthapuram.

The 18th-century Palakkad Fort has sturdy battlements, a moat, and a Hanuman temple on its grounds. North on the Kalpathy River, the 15th-century Viswanatha Swamy Temple is the main venue of the Ratholsavam chariot festival. The river Bharathappuzha flows through Palakkad. Palakkad is on the northern bank of Bharathappuzha River.

Palakkad was included in the South Malabar region of Malabar District during the British Raj. The municipality of Palakkad was formed on 1 November 1866 according to the Madras Act 10 of 1865 (Amendment of the Improvements in Towns act 1850) of the British Indian Empire, along with the municipalities of Kozhikode, Kannur, Thalassery, and Fort Kochi, making them Kerala's oldest modern municipalities.

Indian Institute of Technology, Palakkad is the first and only Indian Institute of Technology in Kerala. It is also home to Government Victoria College, one of the state's oldest institutes of higher education, opened in 1888, and NSS College of Engineering, the fourth engineering college in Kerala, opened in 1960. Mercy College is a women's college located in the city which was established in 1964. It is the first Women's college in the Palakkad District.

Palakkad Railway Division of Southern Railway Zone, one of India's oldest Railway Divisions, is headquartered here. A residential colony of the railway employees of Palakkad Railway Division known as Hemambika Nagar Railway Colony, one of the residential colonies under Southern Railway, is also near the office. The only school in the state run by Southern Railways is within the colony. Multi-Disciplinary Divisional Training Institute (MDDTI) for Group C and D employees of the division is also inside the colony.

== Etymology ==
The commonly held belief is that the name Palakkad is a fusion of two Malayalam words: pāla, which is the local name for blackboard tree (Alstonia scholaris), and kāṭŭ, which means forest.

== History ==
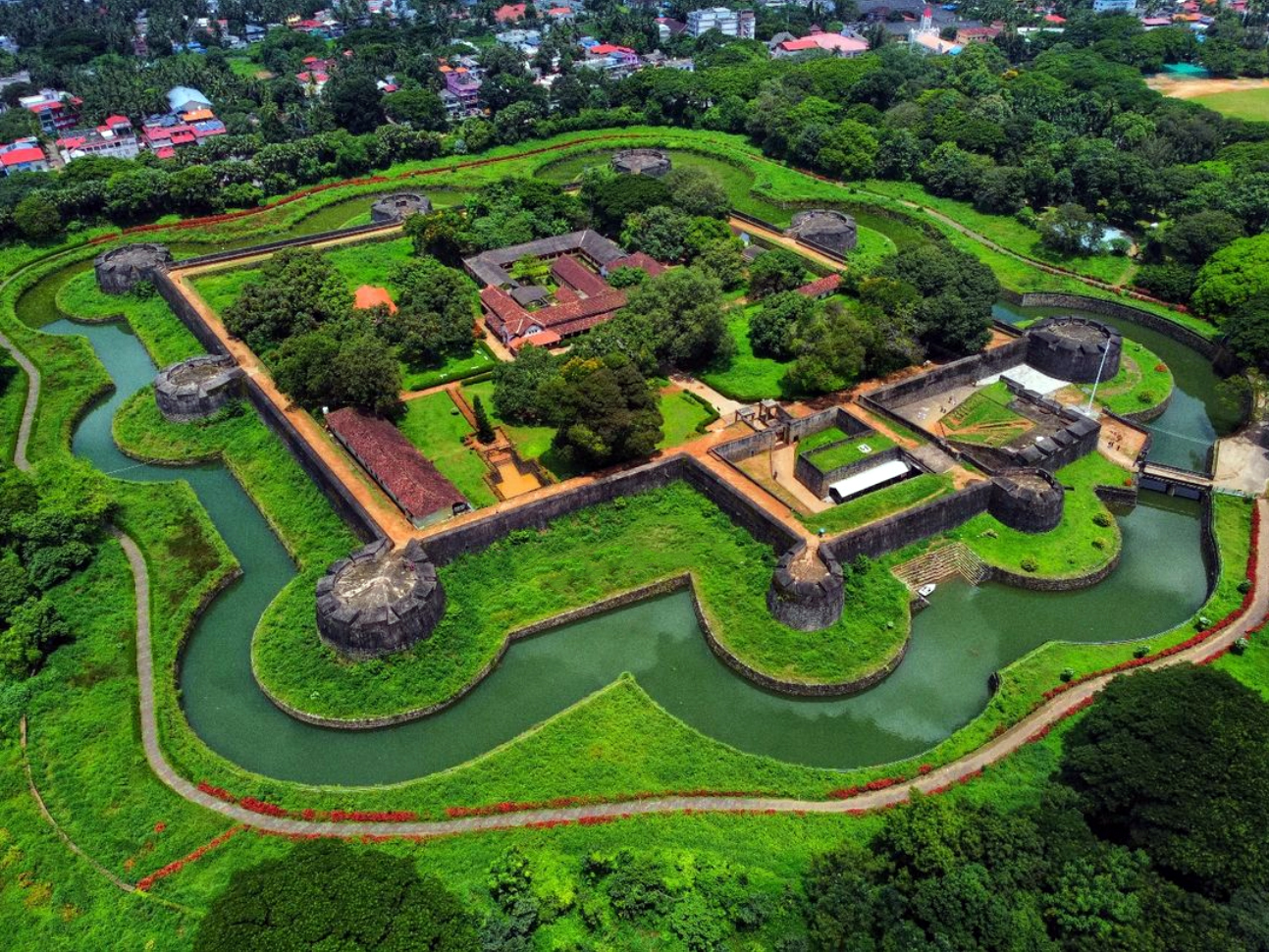
Palakkad Fort was captured and rebuilt by Mysore Sultan Hyder Ali in 1766 CE

The region around Coimbatore was ruled by the Cheras during Sangam period between the first and fourth centuries CE and served as the eastern entrance to the Palakkad Gap, the principal trade route between the Malabar Coast and Tamil Nadu. Palakkad city was ruled by the Palakkad Rajas (Tarur Swaroopam). The Palakkad Raja had the right over the taluks of Palakkad, Alathur, and Chittur. Chittur Taluk was part of Cochin Kingdom. The original headquarters of the Palakkad Rajas were at Athavanad, Tirur Taluk, in present-day Malappuram district. It is said that their lands in the Athavanad area were given to the Azhvanchery Thamprakkal and the Palakkad-Chittur areas were bought from them instead. The territory of Palakkad Rajas had been under the Zamorin of Calicut for sometime.

In 1757, to resist the invasion of the Zamorin of Kozhikode, the Palakkad Raja sought the help of the Hyder Ali of Mysore. In 1766, Hyder Ali defeated the Zamorin of Kozhikode – an East India Company ally at the time – and absorbed Kozhikode into his state. Hyder Ali rebuilt Palakkad Fort in 1766. The smaller princely states in northern and north-central parts of Kerala (Malabar District) including Kolathunadu, Kottayam, Kadathanadu, Kozhikode, Tanur, Valluvanad, and Palakkad were unified under Mysore and were made a part of the larger Kingdom of Mysore. His son and successor, Tipu Sultan, launched campaigns against the expanding British East India Company, resulting in two of the four Anglo-Mysore Wars.

Tipu ultimately ceded the Malabar District and South Kanara to the company in the 1790s as a result of the Third Anglo-Mysore War and the subsequent Treaty of Seringapatam; both were annexed to the Bombay Presidency (which had also included other regions in the western coast of India) of British India in the years 1792 and 1799, respectively. Later in 1800, both of the Malabar District and South Canara were separated from Bombay presidency to merge them with the neighbouring Madras Presidency. Palakkad was under British Raj until 1947.

The municipality of Palakkad was formed on 1 November 1866 according to the Madras Act 10 of 1865 (Amendment of the Improvements in Towns act 1850) of the British Indian Empire, along with the municipalities of Kozhikode, Kannur, Thalassery, and Fort Kochi, making them the first modern municipalities in the modern state of Kerala.

At the time of 1951 Census of India, Palakkad was the second-largest city in the erstwhile Malabar District after Kozhikode. At that time only two towns in Malabar was treated as cities: Kozhikode and Palakkad. Following the formation of the state of Kerala in 1956, the erstwhile Taluk of Palakkad in Malabar District was divided into three: Palakkad, Alathur, and Chittur. Chittur and few areas of Alathur was part of Cochin Kingdom. and Palakkad district was formed by taking parts of Malabar District and Cochin Kingdom.

== Geography ==
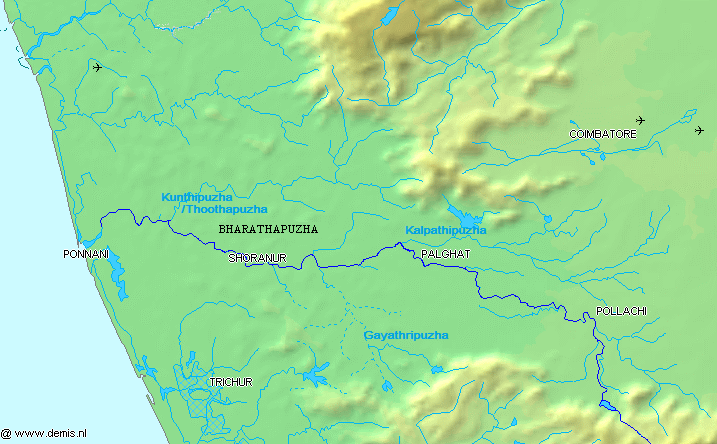
Topography map-Palakkad (Palghat)

Palakkad is the gateway to Kerala due to the presence of the Palakkad Gap in the Western Ghats. The city is in central Kerala. Malayalam is the official language in Palakkad. Two main tributaries of Bharathapuzha, Kalpathi River and Kannadi River flows through the city. Of the numerous dams in Palakkad district, the largest Malampuzha dam is 15 kilometres (9.3 mi) from Palakkad city.

Palakkad is about 347 kilometres (216 mi) northeast of Trivandrum,144 kilometres (89 mi) of Kochi, 50 kilometres (31 mi) southwest of Coimbatore in Tamil Nadu, 66 kilometres (41 mi) northeast of Thrissur, and 127 kilometres (79 mi) southeast of Kozhikode, which are mainly connected by National Highways, namely Salem-Kochi National Highway NH 544, and Kozhikode-Palakkad National Highway NH 966

=== Climate ===
Palakkad has a tropical wet and dry climate. Temperatures remain moderate throughout the year, with the exception being March and April, the hottest months. A very high amount of precipitation is received in Palakkad, mainly due to the South-West monsoon. July is the wettest month, and the total annual rainfall is around 100 cm.

Climate data for Palakkad (1991–2020, extremes 1943–2020)
Month	Jan	Feb	Mar	Apr	May	Jun	Jul	Aug	Sep	Oct	Nov	Dec	Year
Record high °C (°F)	37.6 (99.7)	40.0 (104.0)	41.4 (106.5)	41.9 (107.4)	41.6 (106.9)	40.4 (104.7)	33.6 (92.5)	34.6 (94.3)	35.9 (96.6)	36.2 (97.2)	38.0 (100.4)	36.6 (97.9)	41.9 (107.4)
Mean daily maximum °C (°F)	32.4 (90.3)	34.7 (94.5)	37.0 (98.6)	36.7 (98.1)	34.7 (94.5)	30.4 (86.7)	28.9 (84.0)	29.3 (84.7)	30.6 (87.1)	31.5 (88.7)	31.5 (88.7)	31.0 (87.8)	32.5 (90.5)
Mean daily minimum °C (°F)	22.5 (72.5)	23.2 (73.8)	24.6 (76.3)	25.5 (77.9)	25.3 (77.5)	23.9 (75.0)	23.1 (73.6)	23.4 (74.1)	23.6 (74.5)	23.7 (74.7)	23.8 (74.8)	23.1 (73.6)	23.8 (74.8)
Record low °C (°F)	15.6 (60.1)	15.8 (60.4)	18.6 (65.5)	18.8 (65.8)	19.2 (66.6)	19.0 (66.2)	18.8 (65.8)	19.2 (66.6)	19.4 (66.9)	15.8 (60.4)	16.1 (61.0)	14.0 (57.2)	14.0 (57.2)
Average rainfall mm (inches)	1.8 (0.07)	6.2 (0.24)	18.1 (0.71)	52.3 (2.06)	131.7 (5.19)	376.6 (14.83)	479.0 (18.86)	374.1 (14.73)	203.6 (8.02)	197.2 (7.76)	96.9 (3.81)	13.4 (0.53)	1,951 (76.81)
Average rainy days	0.1	0.4	0.9	3.3	5.6	16.5	20.2	16.2	10.8	9.6	4.8	0.8	89.3
Average relative humidity (%) (at 17:30 IST)	44	39	38	51	60	78	82	81	75	72	63	56	61
Source: India Meteorological Department

== Transport ==
=== Air ===
The nearest international airport is Coimbatore International Airport, which is about 62 kilometres (39 mi) from Palakkad.Cochin International Airport and Calicut International Airport serve the city as well.

There has been a proposal for a mini domestic airport at East Yakkara with respect to setting up domestic airports for enhanced air connectivity by the civil aviation ministry of India. 60 acres has been identified for the project at East Yakkara Palakkad.

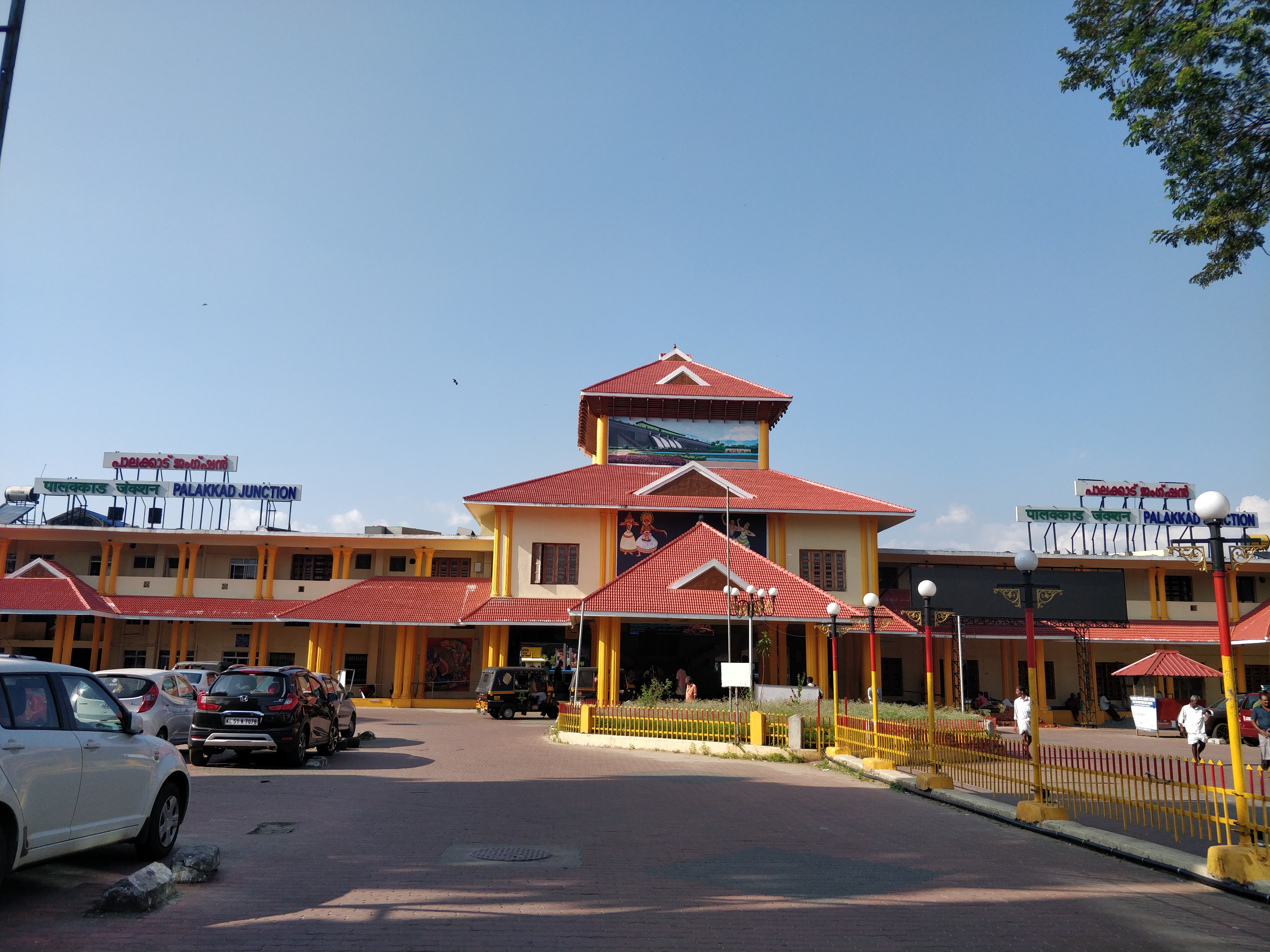
Palakkad Junction Railway Station

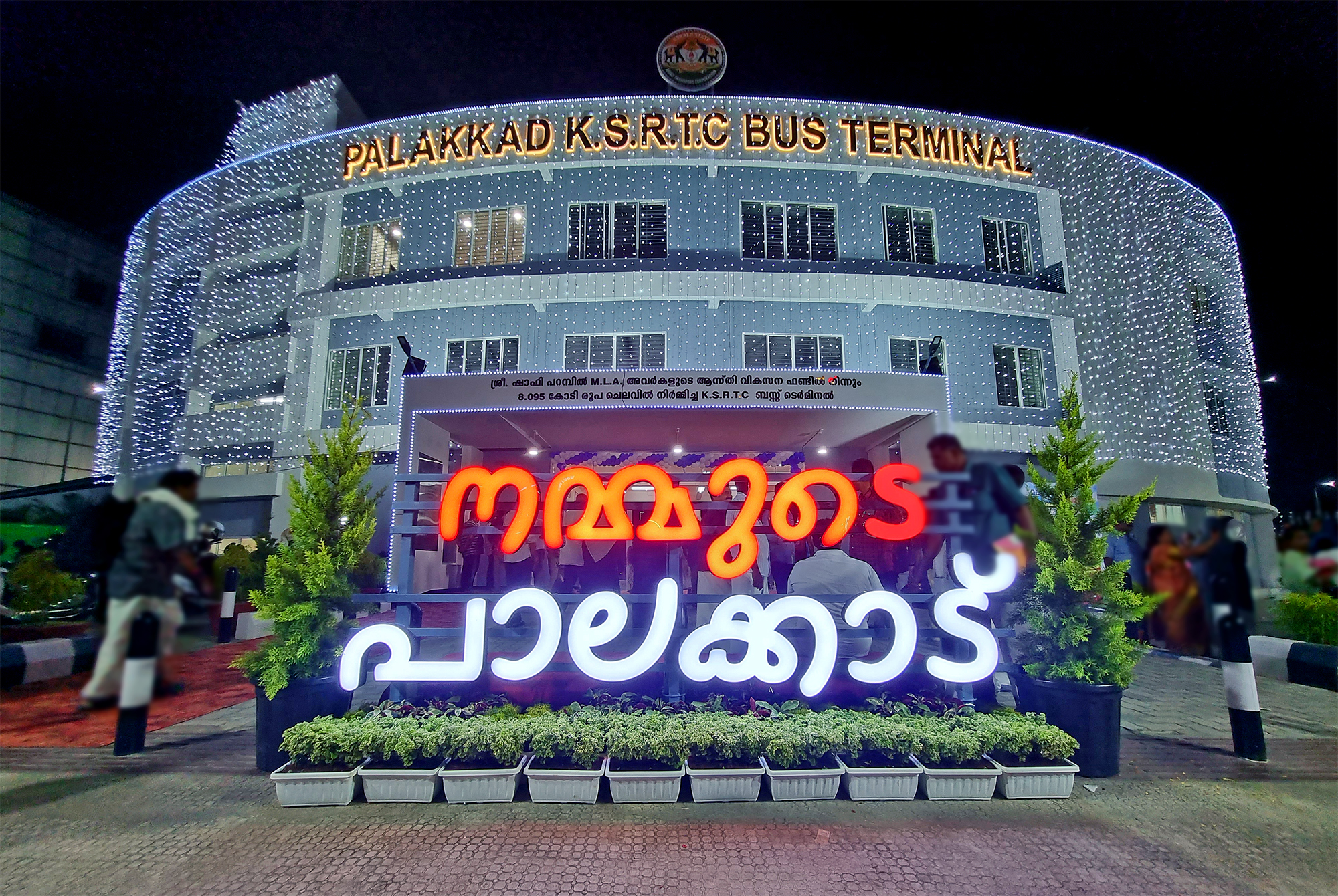
KSRTC Bus terminal, Palakkad

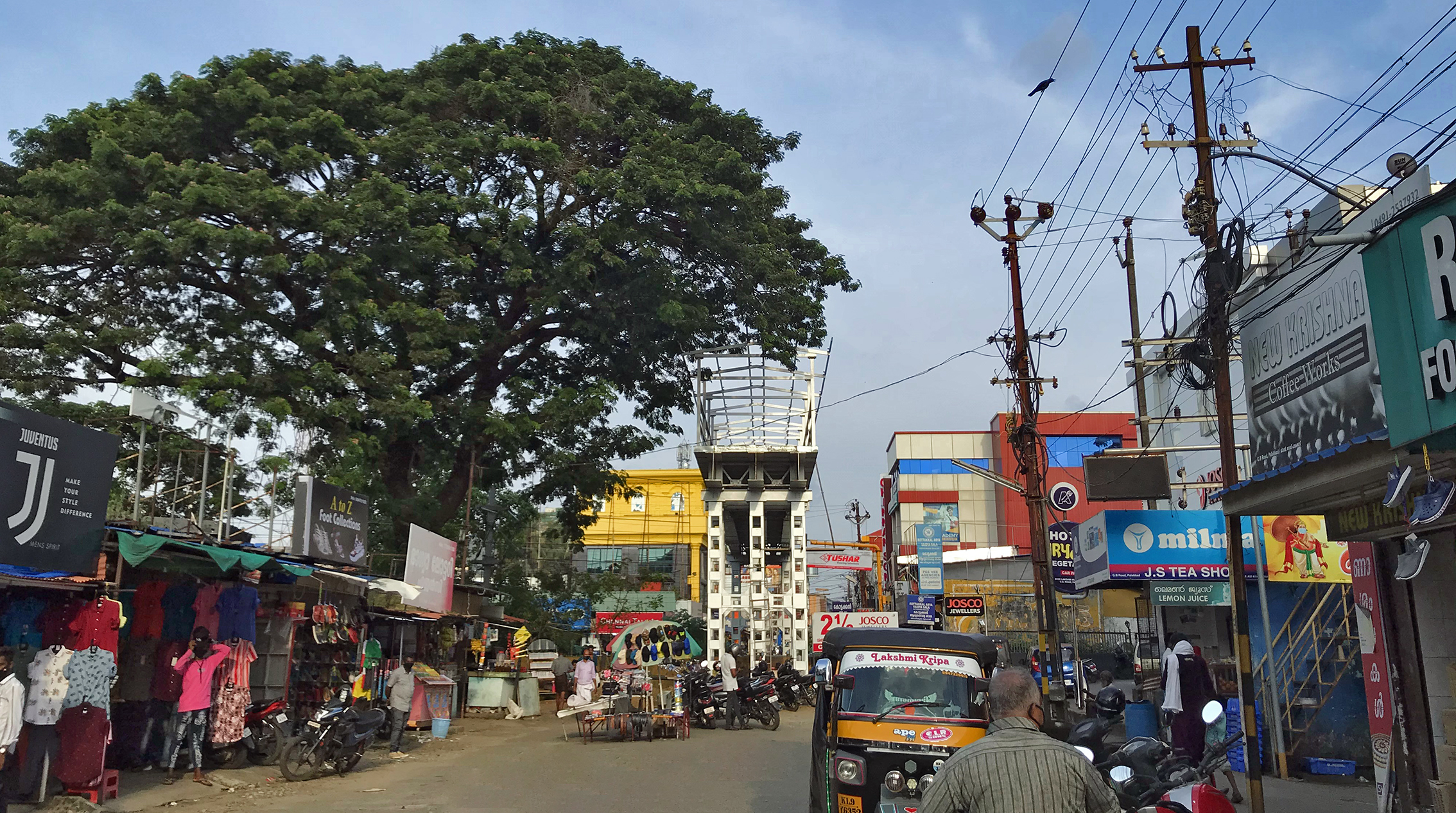
G.B.Road, Palakkad

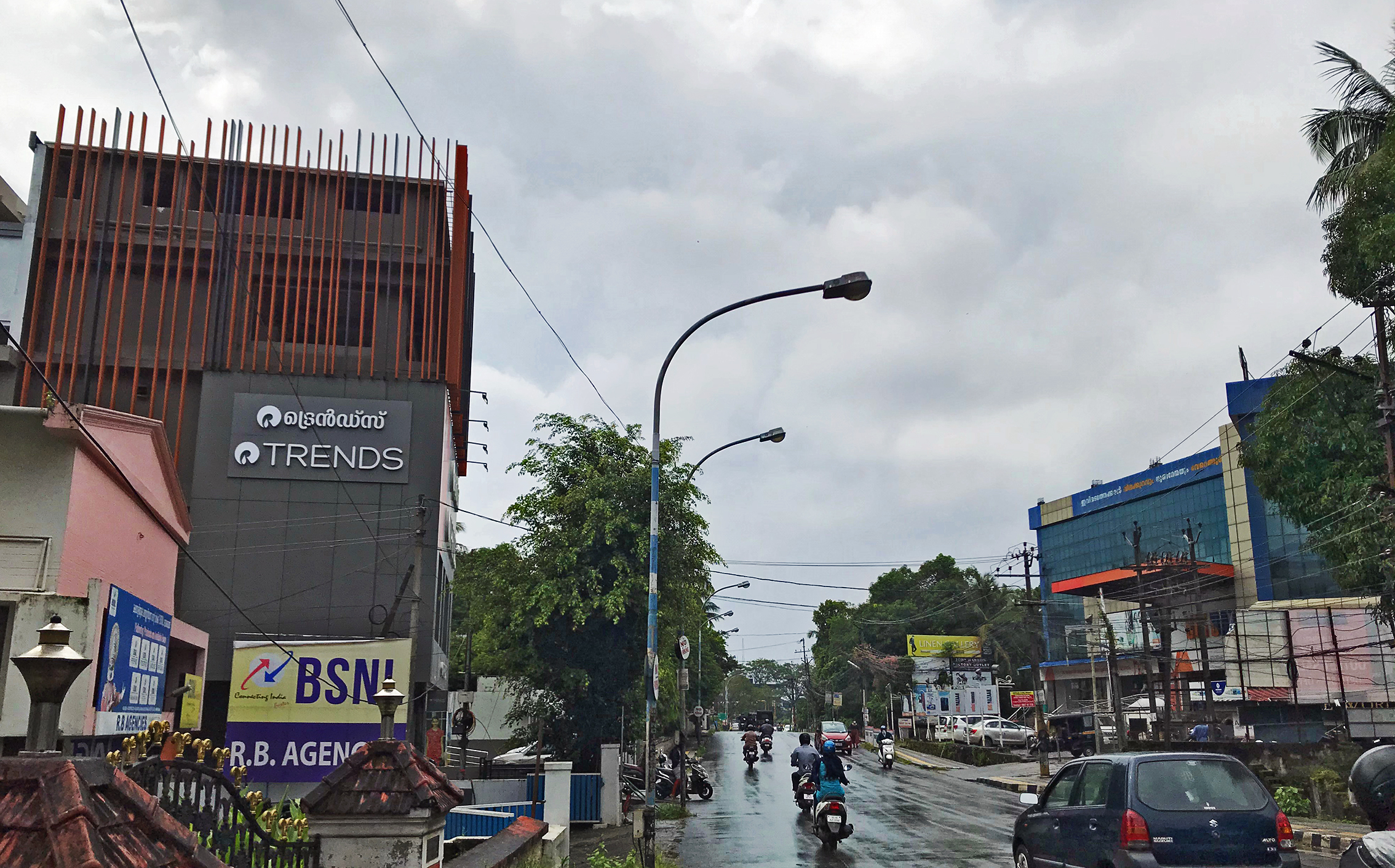
English Church road

=== Railways ===
The Palakkad railway division is one of the six administrative divisions of the Southern Railway zone of Indian Railways, is headquartered in the city. Railways played an important role in framing of the city. It was established on August 4, 1956, making one of oldest railway division in India. It manages 588 route kilometers of track in Kerala, Tamil Nadu, Karnataka and Mahé (in the Union Territory of Puducherry).

The city is served by two railway stations – Palakkad Junction is a broad gauge railway junction (at Olavakkode, about 4 km from Municipal bus stand) and Palakkad Town railway station in the heart of Palakkad city. Recently, pitline installation has been started at Town Railway Station and is expected to be completed by March 2025. By the completion of this project, it could make not only the city a major railway in the state.

=== Road ===
Palakkad has roads connecting it to many major cities. The NH 544 from Salem to Ernakulam passes through the city. NH 966 starts from Ramanattukara in Kozhikode and joins NH 544 at Chandranagar, one of the suburbs of the city. Other major roads are the Palakkad – Ponnani road which connects to NH 66. SH 52 begins near Chandranagar, which connects to Pollachi, and SH 27 begins at the Civil Station and connects to Meenakshipuram (Kerala-Tamil Nadu State Border).

Palakkad City has four Bus Stations includes Palakkad KSRTC bus terminal and three Private Bus stands named Stadium Bus Stand, Municipal Bus stand, and Town Bus Stand. Palakkad KSRTC bus terminal is a Kerala state-owned Kerala State Road Transport Corporation (KSRTC) bus station located in the center of the city, offering inter-state and inter-city services. The terminal, constructed with 8.1 crores allocated by MLA Shafi Parambil from his asset development fund, is a three-story building. The terminal includes amenities such as commercial space, parking for interstate vehicles, street lighting in the adjacent regions, drinking water for commuters, a renovated workshop and yard, restrooms, and other amenities for drivers and conductors. The renovated bus terminal was opened to the public on November 10, 2022.

== Demographics ==
Religions in palakkad
Religion	Percent
Hindus	68%
Muslims	27.9%
Christians	3.8%
Others	0.3%

As per 2011 census, population of Palakkad is 130,955; of which male and female are 63,833 and 67,122 respectively.

Total literates in Palakkad city are 112,479, of which 56,065 are males while 56,414 are females. The average literacy rate of Palakkad city is 94.20 percent of which male and female literacy was 96.83 and 91.73 percent. The literacy rate of the Palakkad Metropolitan Area is 92.14%, much higher than the national average of 59.5%.

Hindus form 68% of the population with 89098 members. Muslims constitute 27.9% of the population with 36620 members. Christians constitute 3.8% of the population with 5006 members.

== Governance ==
=== Legislature ===
Palakkad city is represented in the Kerala State Assembly by two elected members, one from Palakkad Assembly constituency and another from Malampuzha Assembly constituency. Palakkad Municipality forms part of Palakkad Assembly Constituency. As of 2026, Ramesh Pisharody of INC is the representative of Palakkad Assembly Constituency and A. Prabhakaran of CPI(M) is the representative of Malampuzha Assembly Constituency.

The city is also a part of the Palakkad Lok Sabha constituency and elects a member to the Lok Sabha, the lower house of the Parliament of India, every five years. The current MP is V. K. Sreekandan of the Indian National Congress.

=== Executive ===
Collectorate of Palakkad district is located in the city. Many other offices including District Court Complex and District Panchayat Office are also in the city. Palakkad taluk office is also in civil station, and administers an area of 713 km^{2} with a population of 6,21,622, making it the district's most populous taluk.

=== Law and order ===
The city is the headquarters of Palakkad District Police. Mainly, three police stations serve the city: North, South, and Traffic police stations. Hemambika Nagar, Palakkad Kasaba, Malampuzha and Walayar Police Stations also serve the city. Kerala Armed Police 2 Battalion is situated at Muttikulangara, one of the suburbs. District Armed Reserved Police Camp of Palakkad district is in Kallekkad, about 10 km from the centre of the city.

== Economy ==
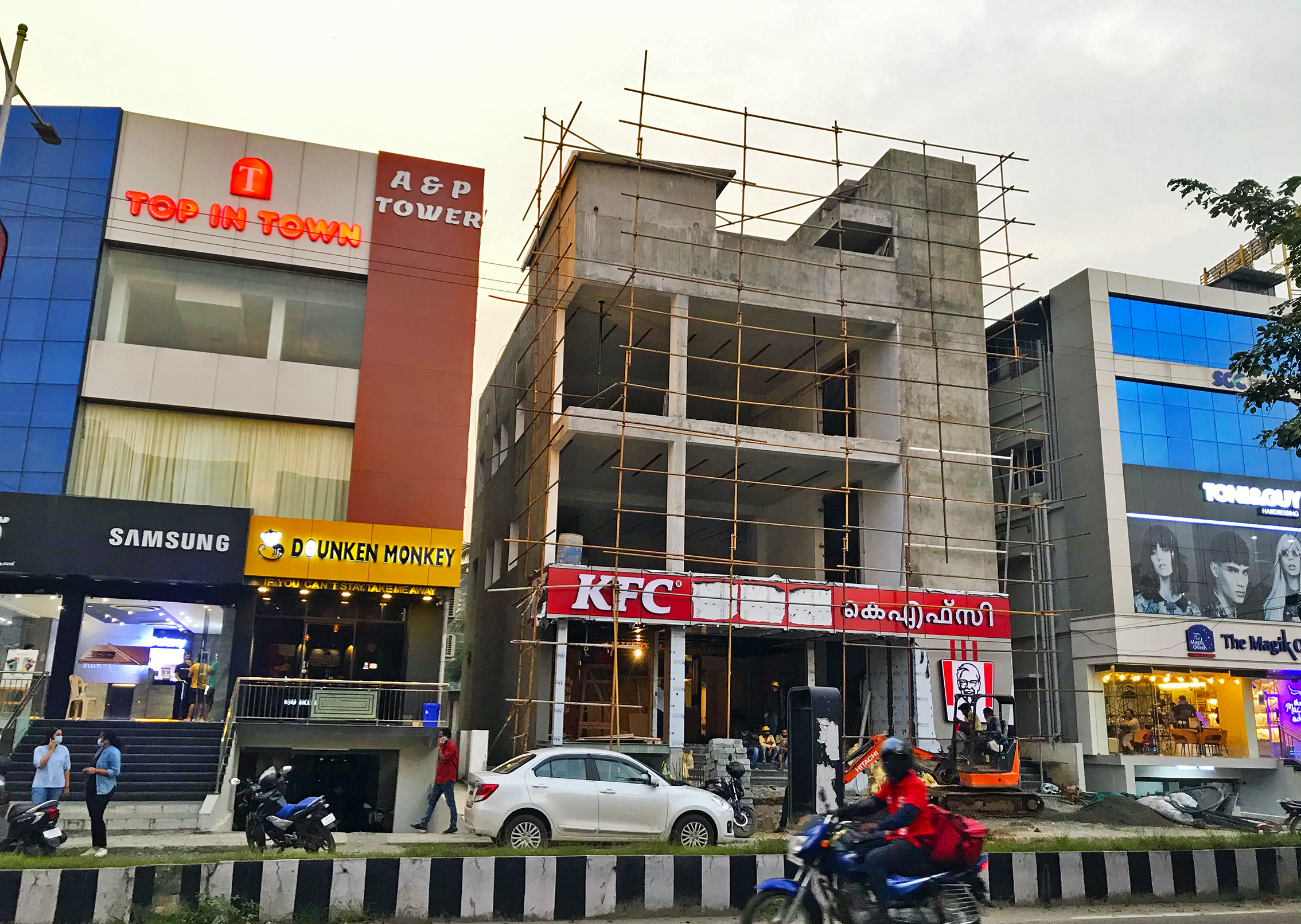
Stadium bypass road

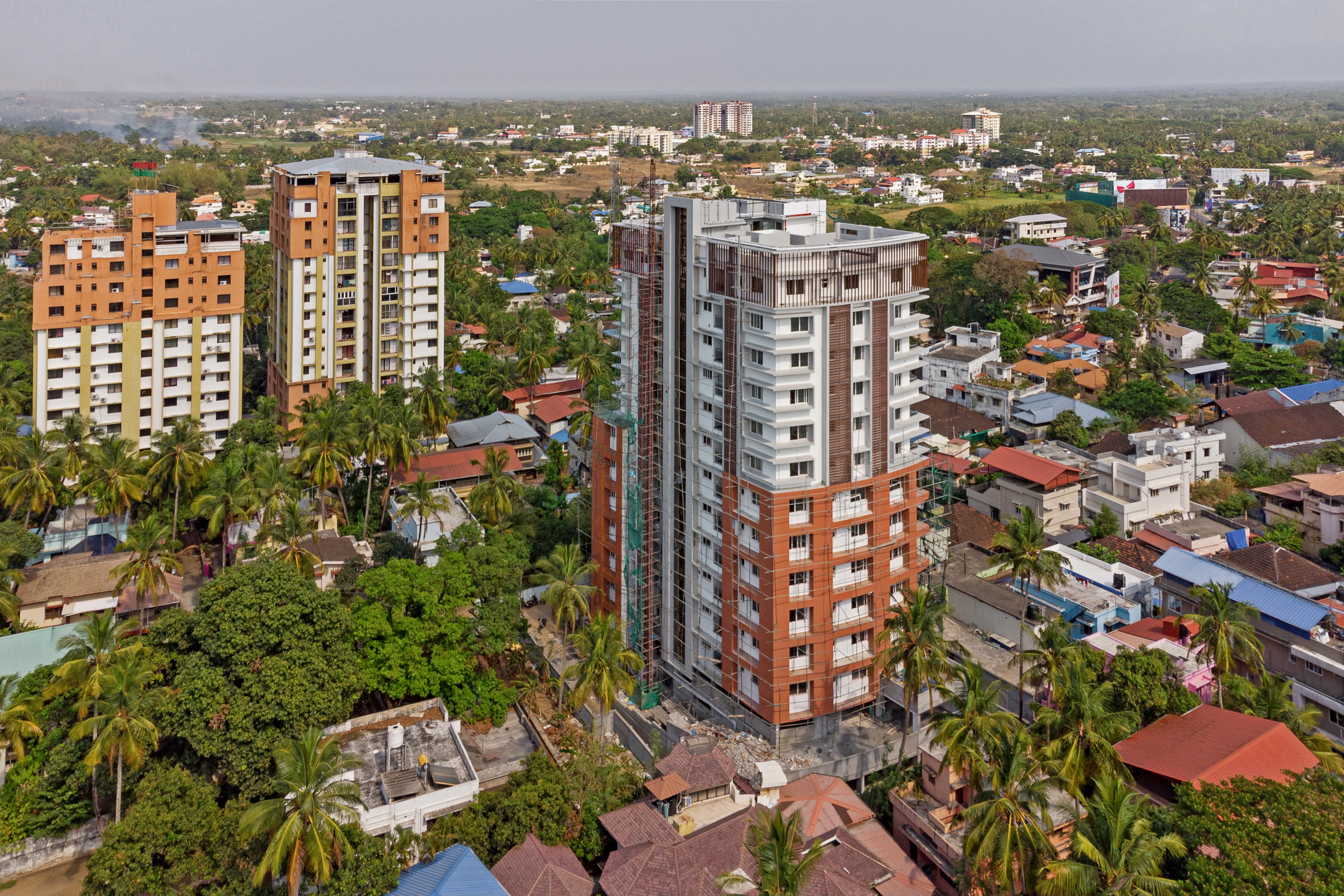
Growing Skyline of Palakkad city

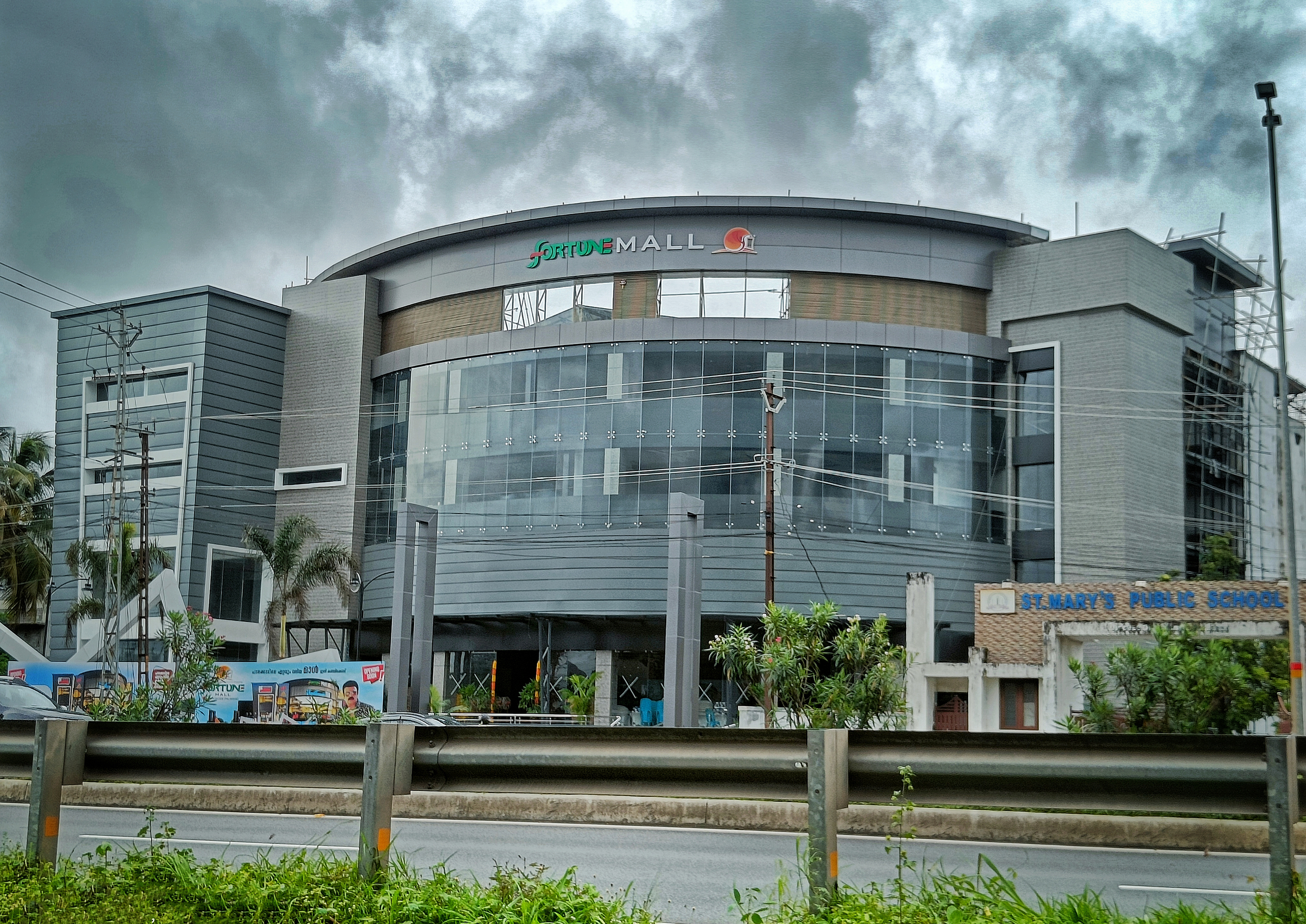
A Shopping Mall in Kanjikode

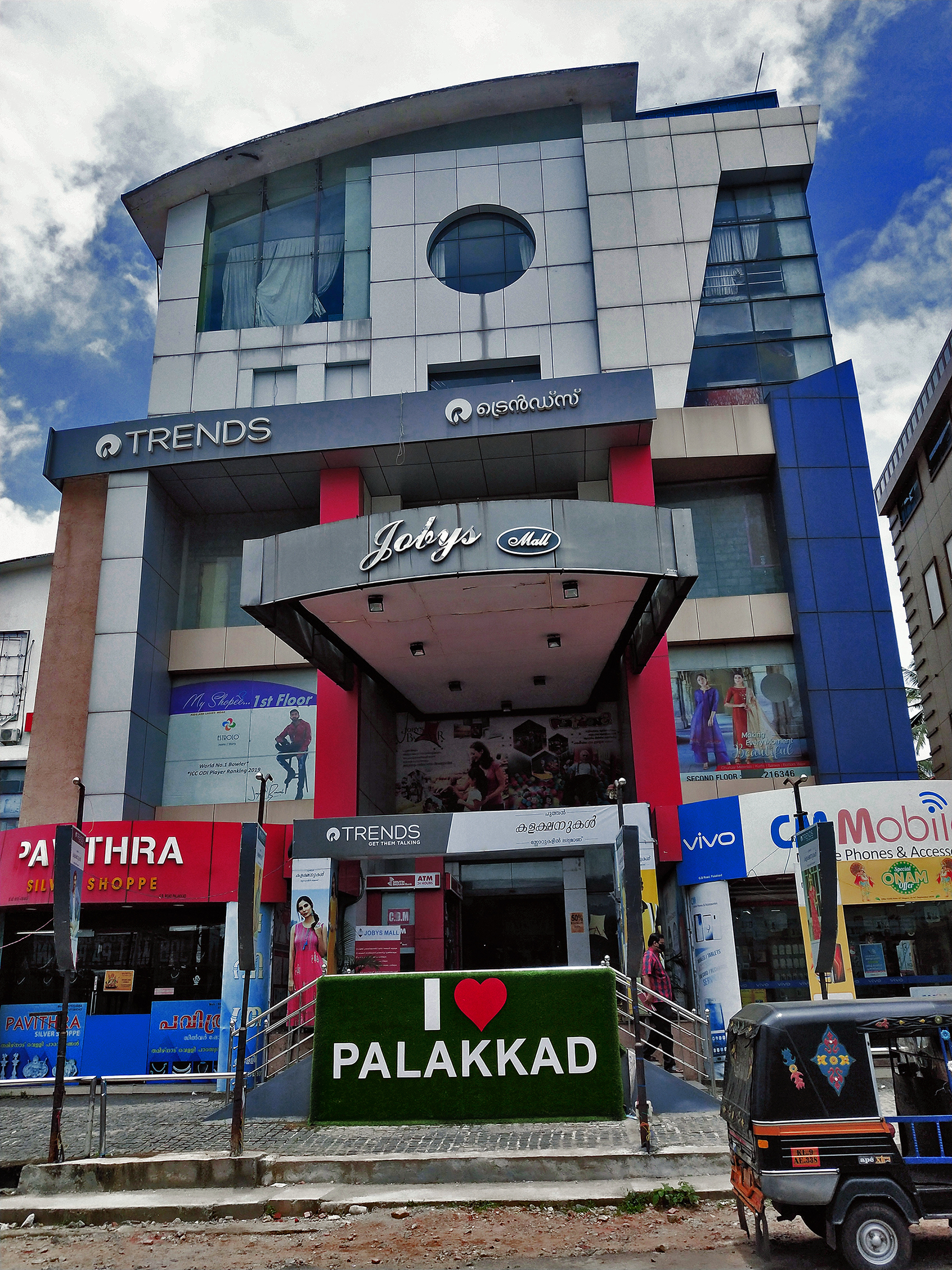
Joby's Mall, first mall in Palakkad

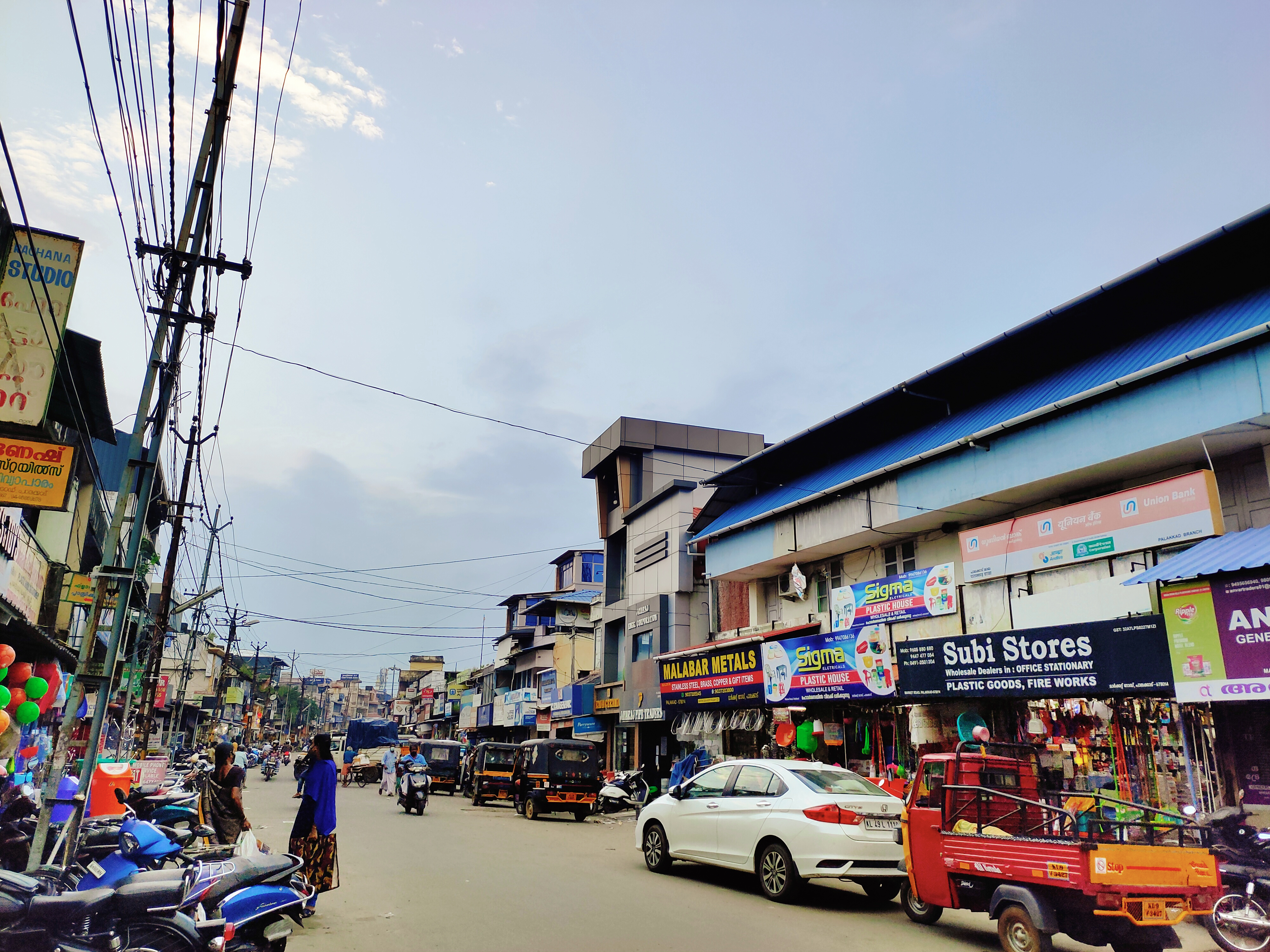
Valiyangadi or Big Bazaar

The presence of Palakkad Gap and proximity to Coimbatore makes Palakkad economically important. British Physical Laboratories (BPL) was founded in 1963 in Palakkad. Market Road is one of the oldest and longest roads devoted to trade and commerce. It stretches from Melamuri Junction on the west to Shakunthala Junction on the east, covering 3 km, and was Palakkatussery's commercial centre and a major marketplace. This stretch of the city is known as Valiyangadi or Big Bazaar. Many wholesale shops are along this road. Kanjikode area of Palakkad city is second largest industrial hub in Kerala after Kochi. Kanjikode has many companies like Indian Telephone Industries Limited (ITI), Instrumentation Limited, Fluid Control Research Institute(FCRI),Saint-Gobain India Private Limited (formerly SEPR Refractories India Private Limited), Patspin India Ltd, Pepsi, PPS steel (Kerala) PVT Ltd, United Breweries, Empee Distilleries, Marico, Bharat Earth Movers Limited (BEML), Rubfila International Ltd, Sitics Logistics, Arya Vaidya Pharmacy, Kottakkal Arya Vaidya Sala have production facilities. There are also many other steel manufacturing units and other production centres making it second largest industrial area in Kerala.

The commercialization of Palakkad city is Picking up and growing at a steady pace in recent years, Nowadays Palakkad city and the suburbs are witnessing a rapid amount of commercial and public development activities. The developments are mainly concentrated on the bypass roads, Both Stadium and Calicut bypass roads passing through the city are getting major commercial projects. Major national and international branded Retail chains, food chains, Restaurants, Hotels, Shopping complexes, Textiles, branded jewellers, and Vehicle Showrooms, are functioning in and around the city. There are many housing colonies consisting of Villas and apartments also present in Palakkad City and its suburbs.

== Civic Administration ==
On 3 July 1866, the Governor of Madras declared Palakkad as a city. The municipality of Palakkad was formed on 1 November 1866 according to the Madras Act 10 of 1865. (Amendment of the Improvements in Towns act 1850). On 11 September 1912, the system of electing the city father by the councillors began. City Council expanded to 28 wards in 1938, 32 wards in 1973 and 36 wards in 1978. During the period 1995–98 and in 2015 when Municipality celebrated 150 years, there were proposals to upgrade Palakkad Municipality to a Municipal Corporation. Palakkad Municipality has 52 wards now, headed by Municipal Chairperson. The current Chairperson of Palakkad Municipality is K.Priya Ajayan and E. Krishnadas is the deputy chairman.

=== Proposed Palakkad Municipal Corporation ===
The metropolitan area of Palakkad includes Palakkad Municipality, Hemambika Nagar, Marutharode, Pirayiri, Pudussery West, Pudussery Central and Puthupariyaram. Its urban / metropolitan population is 293,566 of which 143,650 are males and 149,916 are females. The proposed Palakkad Municipal Corporation has an area of 197.566 km^{2}. Following local bodies are supposed to be part of the proposed municipal corporation.

- Palakkad Municipality
- Pirayiri Panchayat
- Puthupariyaram Panchayat
- Kannadi Panchayat
- Marutharode Panchayat
- Parts of Akathethara Panchayat
- Parts of Pudussery Panchayat
- Parts of Kodumba Panchayat

== Education ==
The city of Palakkad has number of Prominent Educational Institutions which provide a great platform for higher education.Government Victoria College, Palakkad was established in the year 1866, making it one of the oldest institution of higher learning in Kerala. First and the only Indian Institute of Technology in the state of Kerala, Indian Institute of Technology, Palakkad is located in the city. The campus currently functions in two campuses-temporary one at Ahalia Campus and the Nila campus which are separated by 13 km. It is one of the five new IITs proposed in the 2014 Union budget of India.

Government Medical College, Palakkad, started in 2014 is the first Government medical college in the district. It is the first medical college in country under Scheduled caste Development Department. NSS College of Engineering at Akathethara, is the fourth Engineering Institution established in Kerala, India. It was founded in 1960 by Nair Service Society.The college is one among the only three Govt-Aided Engineering college in Kerala and is the first Govt-Aided Engineering college accredited by NBA of AICTE. Chembai Memorial Government Music College is one of the main center of excellence in teaching Carnatic music in the state. It was given the name of the legendary Carnatic musician Chembai Vaidyanatha Bhagavathar from Palakkad. Mercy College is a women's college located in the city which was established in 1964. It is the first Women's college in the Palakkad District. The college is organized by the University Grants Commission.

Ahalia Campus is the largest Edu-health campus in Kerala. It is located about 18 km from the centre of the city consisting of a number of educational institutions and medical institutes. It has three hospitals, one medical college, one school and five colleges which includes an engineering college, college of pharmacy, college of optometry, college of paramedical sciences and college of management. Basel Evangelical Mission Higher Secondary School, located in the city was established in 1858 making it one of the oldest schools in Kerala. Government Moyan Model Girls Higher Secondary School located in College Road was founded in 1917 and is one of the largest government schools in the state and one of the schools having large strength of students studying.

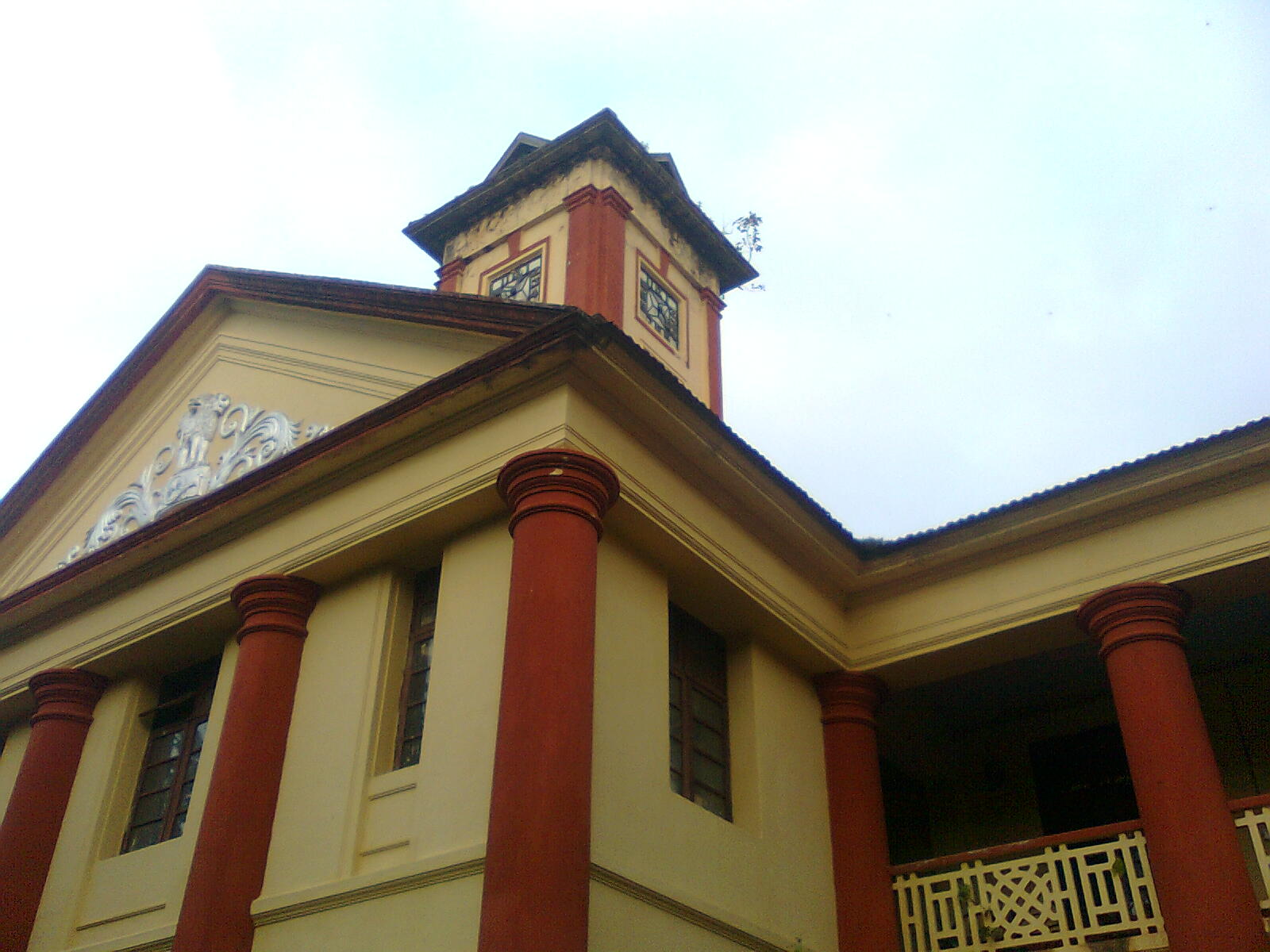
Victoria College

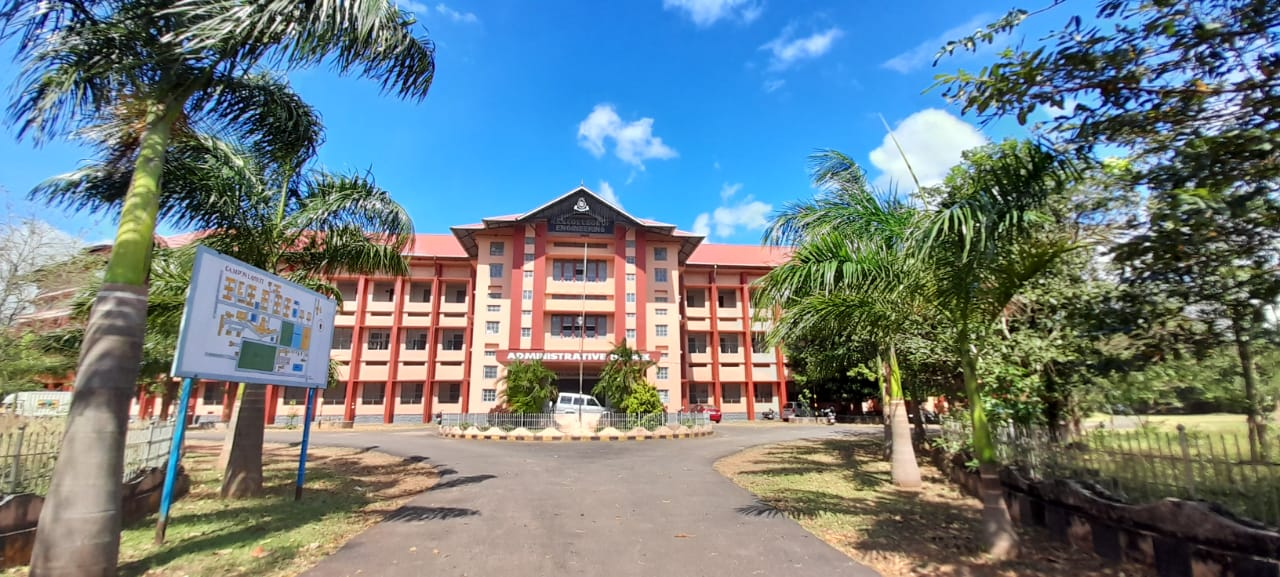
NSS College of Engineering, Palakkad

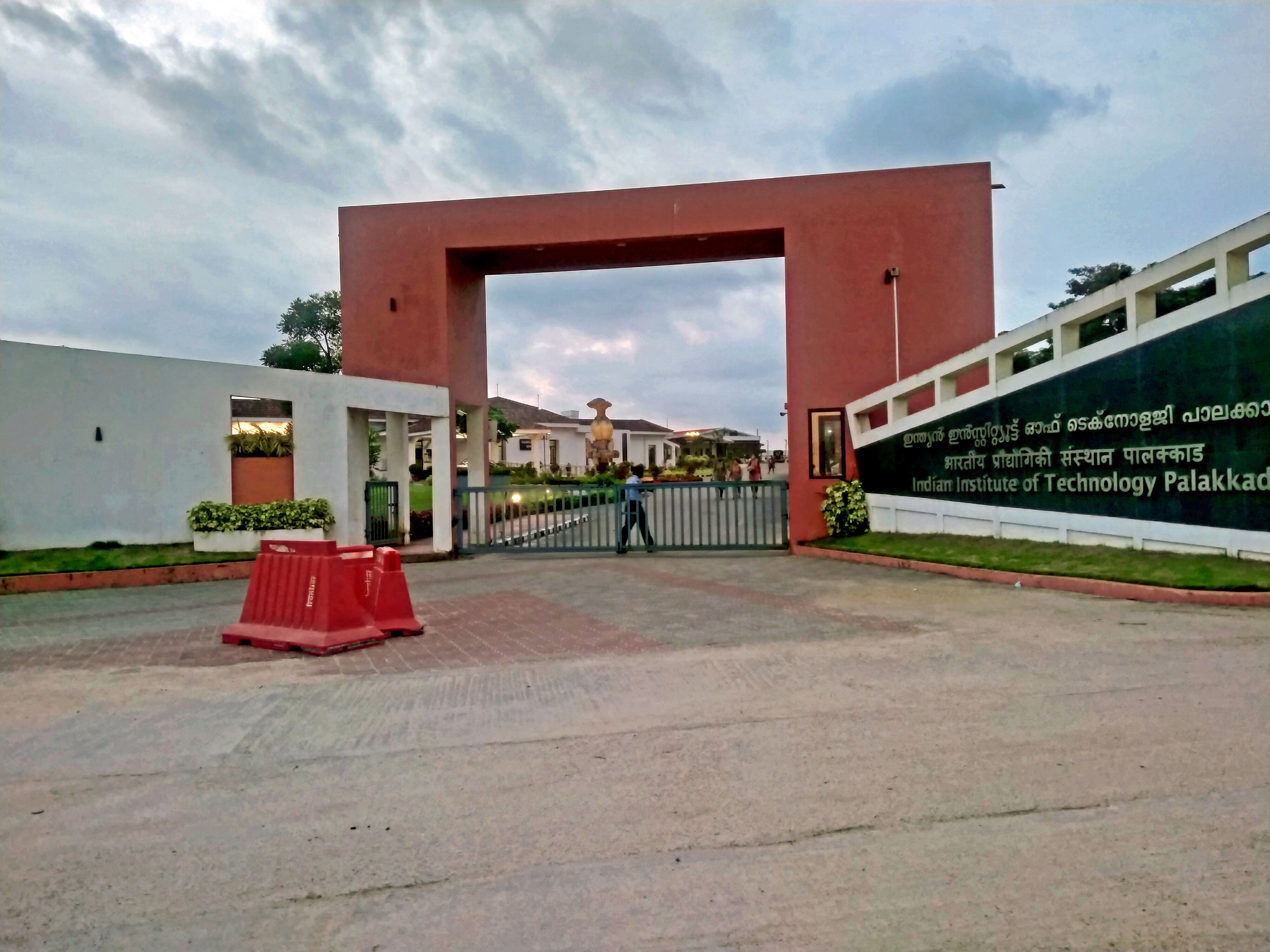
IIT Palakkad main Entrance

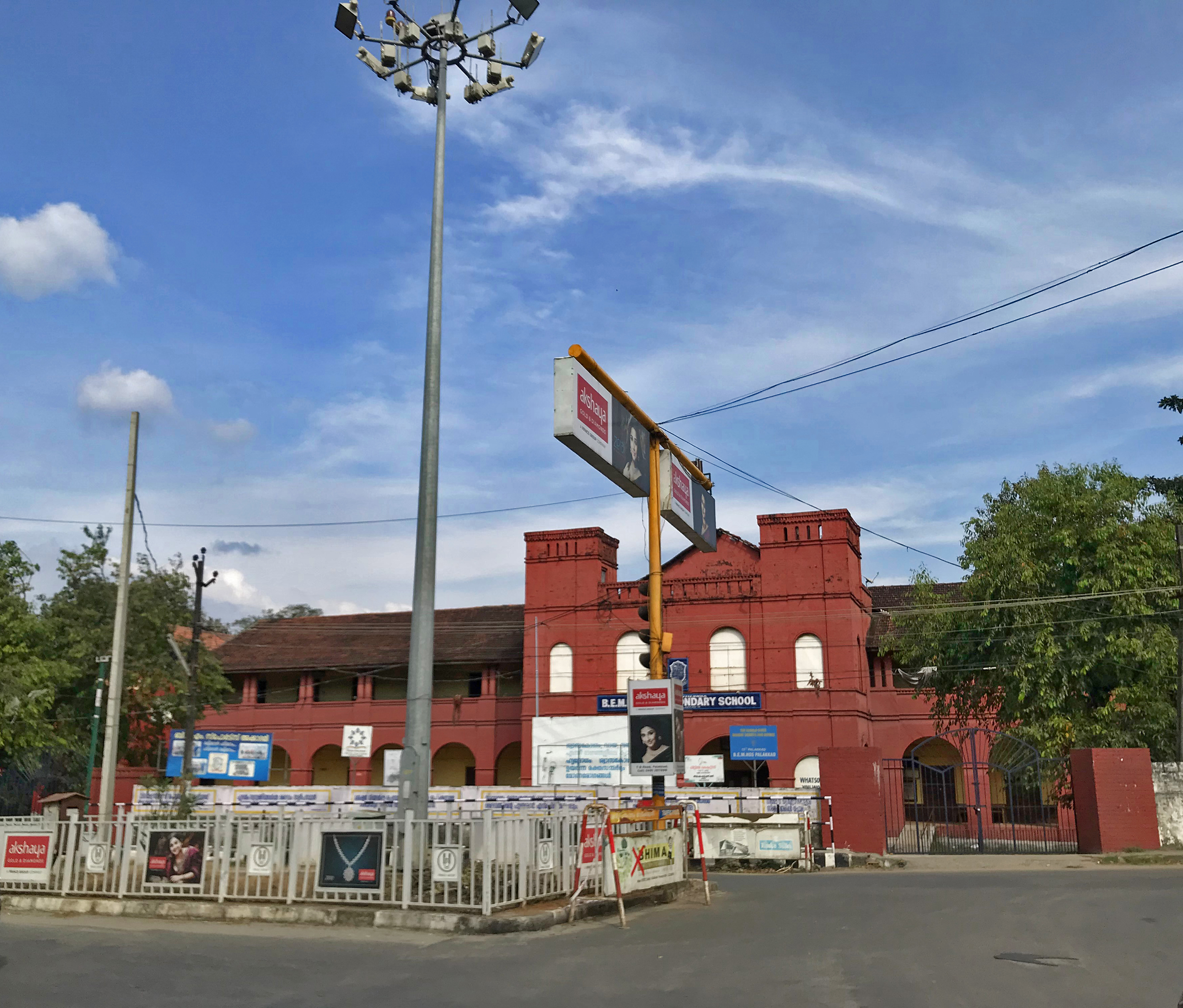
Basel Evangelical Mission Higher Secondary School, Palakkad

== Healthcare ==
First government medical college in the district (Government Medical College, Palakkad) is located in the city. District Hospital located in Court Road is one of biggest district hospitals in Kerala. There are also some private hospitals for serving the city. Rajiv Gandhi Co-Operative Multispeciality Hospital is a Cooperative Hospital located at Kallekkad, one of the suburbs of the city.Ahalia Campus is the largest edu-health campus in Kerala located about 18 km from centre of the city, consists of 3 hospitals and 1 medical college including Ahalia Foundation Eye Hospital, Ahalia Ayurvedic Medical College and Hospital, Ahalia Diabetes Hospital and Ahalia Women and Children's Hospital.

== Notable people ==
- E Sreedharan
- P. R. Pisharoty (Kollengode, Father of remote sensing in India)
- Vella Eacharan
- K. Sankaranarayanan (former Governor of Maharashtra, Nagaland Jharkhand, Assam and Arunachal Pradesh)
- T. N. Seshan (former Chief Election Commissioner)
- Vidya Balan
- K P Kesava Menon
- Sudev Nair
- E. K. Niranjan (decorated military officer)
- V P Menon
- Kunjan Nambiar
- Olappamanna
- M T Vasudevan Nair
- O V Vijayan
- Akkitham Achuthan Namboothiri
- Malayattoor Ramakrishnan
- Dr Shashi Tharoor (writer, former Under Secretary General of The United Nations, incumbent Member of Parliament for Thiruvananthapuram Lok Sabha Constituency)
- Anita Nair
- A. V. Vasudevan Potti
- K. S. Sethumadhavan
- Shankar Mahadevan (playback singer and composer)
- M. G. Ramachandran
- P. Unnikrishnan
- Rajesh Hebbar
- K. S. Sethumadhavan
- Lakshmy Ramakrishnan
- O.Rajagopal
- Shyamaprasad
- P. U. Chitra
- Vidya Vox
- Rahul Sadasivan
- Vivek Ramaswamy

== Culture ==
Palakkad is a city where people from all religions live together with peace. Many temples, mosques churches and other religious centres are located in and around the city. Manappullikavu Vela is one of the largest fests that takes place in the city. It is hosted by 8 sets of committees or deshams. Large crowds gather in front of the fort for witnessing the fest. Elephants and fireworks are the highlights. Kalpathi Ratholsavam is an annual fest that takes place in Kalpathy, which is the first heritage village in Kerala. Chariot is the main attraction of the fest. There are also many other festivals in the city where people come and enjoy with unity by forgetting about religion.

Heritage villages or mostly called by Agraharams are important as far as the city is concerned. There are around 24 heritage villages in and around the city where the Tamil Brahmins migrated from parts Tamil Nadu many years before live together. A Jain temple is located at Jainamedu, one of the suburbs of the city and is one of the few places in Kerala where the vestiges of Jainism in Kerala have survived. Sree Emoor Bhagavathy temple located at Kallekulangara, another suburb of the city is believed to be consecrated by Parasurama for the safety of Kerala. Holy Trinity English Church located near Palakkad Fort was established in the year 1855. The only Urdu Juma Masjid in Kerala is located at Diara Street.

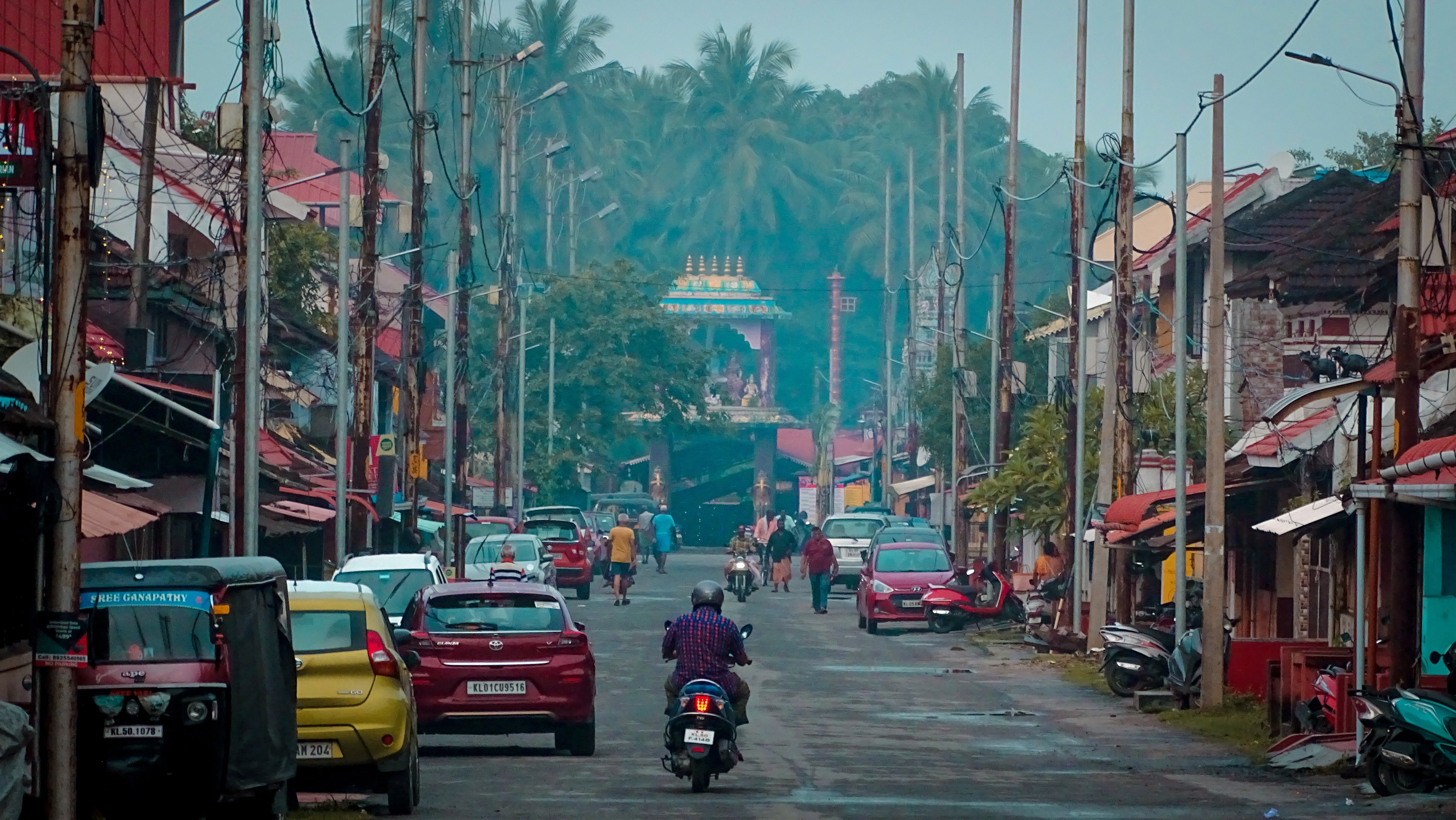
A street in Kalpathy

== Media ==
Some of the major Malayalam and English newspapers from Kerala including Malayala Manorama, Mathrubhumi, Deshabhimani, and Suprabhaatham Daily have printing centers in the city, and there are also few evening newspapers published in the city. Local news channels like (ACV) are also functioning in the city. Palakkad Press Club is located on Robinson road, Sultanpet. A private FM Station operating in Palakkad at Ahalya Campus. There is a long-term demand for setting up a government FM Station in Palakkad. At present total number of 8 cinema halls are operational in Palakkad which screens Malayalam, English, Tamil, and Hindi movies, there are a few other multiplex screens under construction and expected to open in the near future. in and around the city.

== Sports ==
Palakkad has a rich history of producing some world class athletes in the state, Palakkad, Indira Gandhi Municipal Stadium in the center of city was once used for Major sports meets and football matches in state, now the stadium is not in condition for conducting games due to the lack of maintenance, There is a proposal for the renovation of the stadium with international facilities by the Municipality, The city has Fort Maidan also known as Kota Maidanam, is a multi-use stadium in the center of the Palakkad, India. It is currently used mostly for cricket matches. Fort Maidan holds a maximum capacity of 10,000 people at a time. Up until 2002 the ground was considered for local cricket only. In 2003, Ranji Trophy was introduced in Fort Maidan. The city has an indoor stadium located near Government Victoria College, Palakkad with a total area of 100,000 square feet (9,300 m^{2}) with commercial establishments is still unfinished & incomplete. There is a Synthetic Track with Eight lines operational in the ground of the Government Medical College, Palakkad.

== See also ==
- Palakkad North
- Palakkad South
- Economy of Palakkad
