= Marutharode =

Marutharode Marutharoad
- Suburb
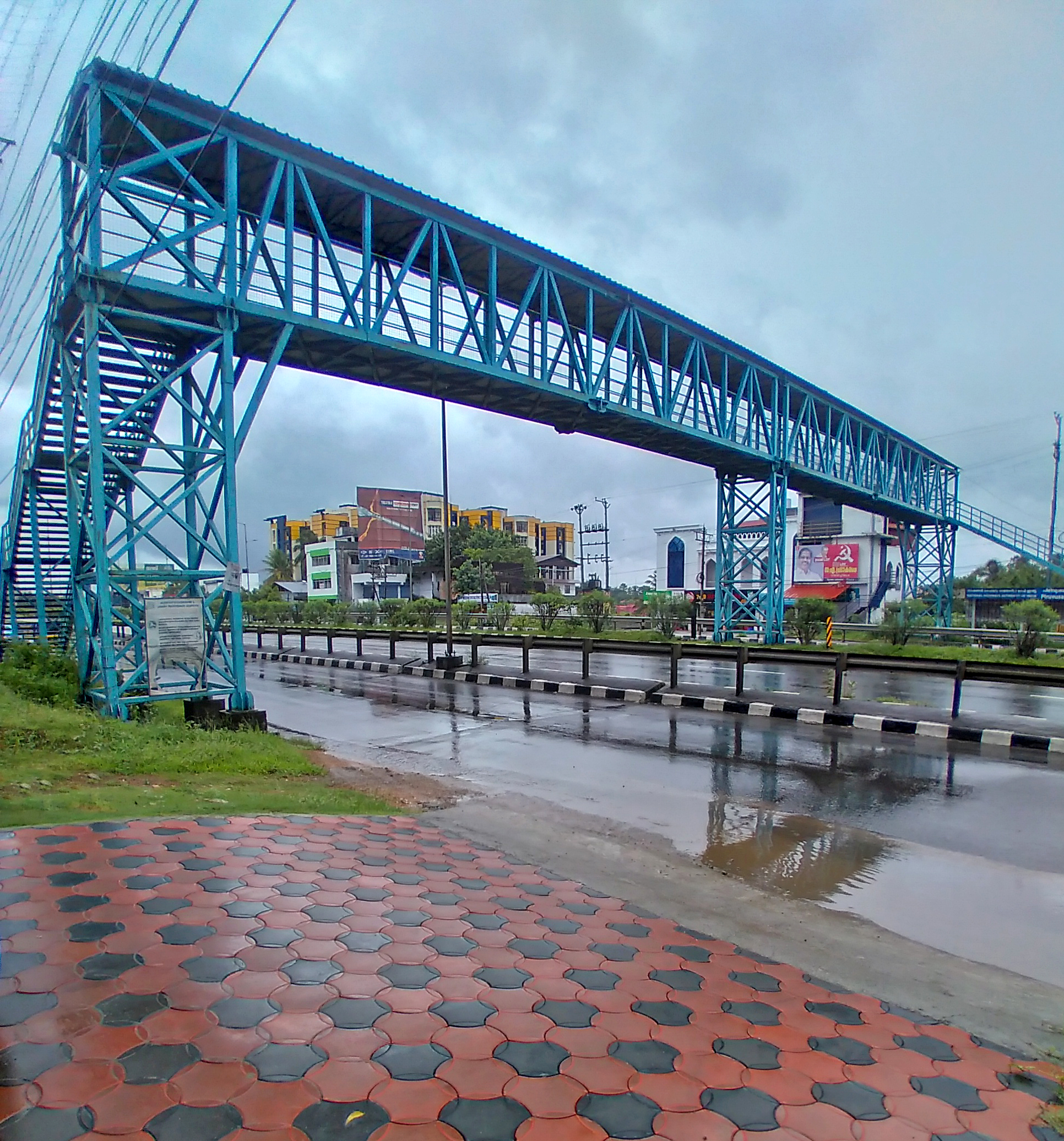
- FOB Pirivusala, Marutharode

- Location in Kerala, India
- Coordinates: 10.7737°N 76.6973°E
- Country: India
- State: Kerala
- District: Palakkad

Government
  - Type: Panchayati Raj (India)
  - Body: Marutharode Panchayat

Area
  - Total: 19.68 km^{2} (7.60 sq mi)

Population (2011)
  - Total: 34,627
  - Density: 1,760/km^{2} (4,557/sq mi)

Languages
  - Official: Malayalam, English
- Time zone: UTC+5:30 (IST)
- PIN: 678007
- Vehicle registration: KL-09
- Parliament constituency: Palakkad
- Assembly constituency: Malampuzha

Marutharode (also spelled Marutharoad) is a census town, gram panchayat and suburb of Palakkad city in the Palakkad district, state of Kerala, India. It is one of Panchayat which is supposed to be part of proposed Palakkad Municipal Corporation.

== Demographics ==
As of 2011 Census, Marutharode had a population of 24,963 with 12,304 males and 12,659 females. Marutharode census town has an area of 9.52 km^{2} (3.68 sq mi) with 6,040 families residing in it. 9% of the population was under 6 years of age. Marutharode had an average literacy of 89.67% higher than the national average of 74.04% and lower than state average of 94.00%; male literacy was 93.72% and female literacy was 85.78%.
