= Government Medical College, Palakkad =

School in Kerala, India

Institute of Integrated Medical Science
- ഇൻസ്റ്റിറ്റ്യൂട്ട് ഓഫ് ഇന്റഗ്രേറ്റഡ് മെഡിക്കൽ സയൻസ്
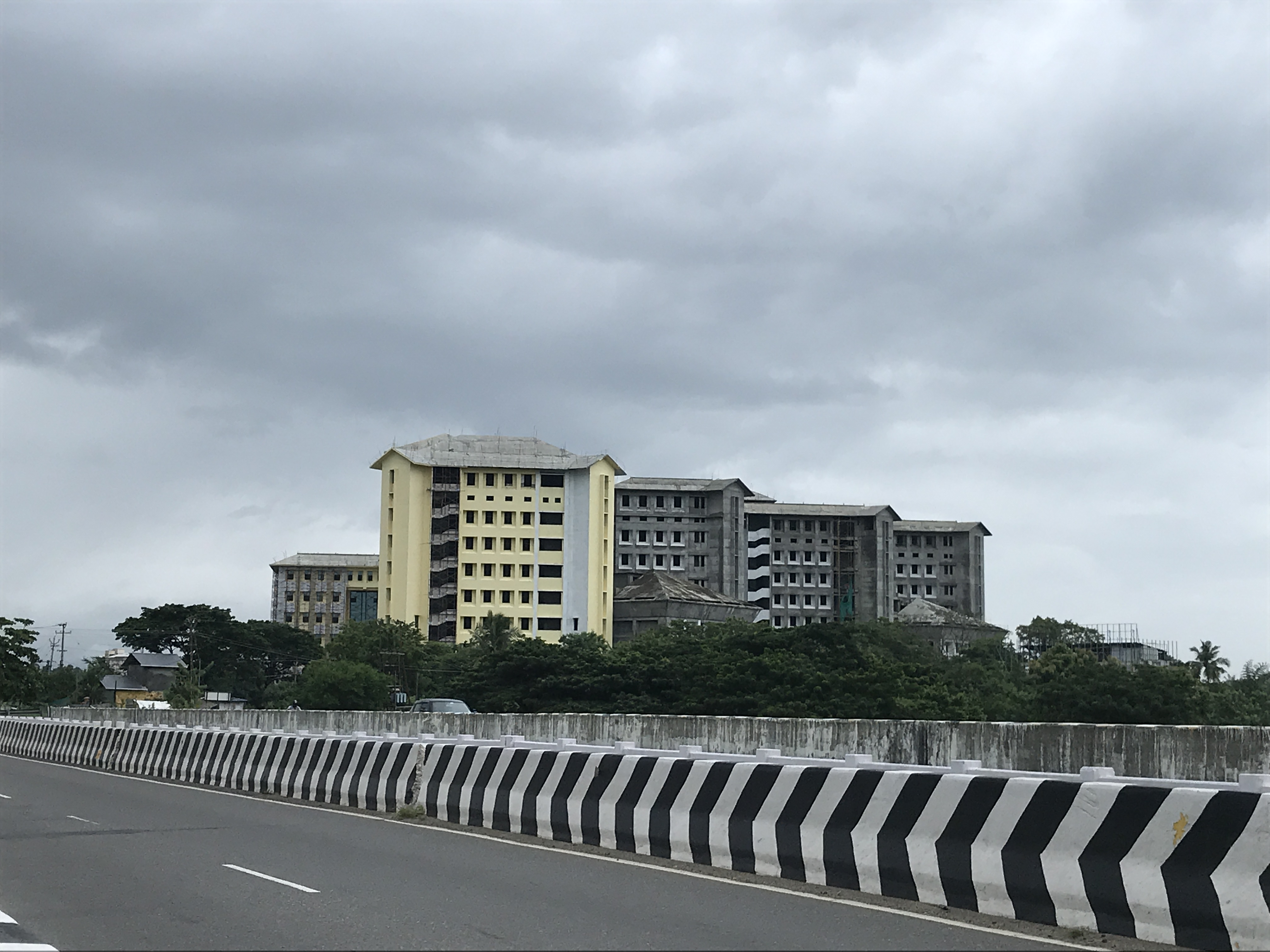
- IIMS Palakkad
- Other name: GMC-PKD / IIMS
- Type: Government Medical College
- Established: 2014; 12 years ago
- Accreditation: Indian Medical Council
- Affiliations: NMC
- Academic affiliations: Kerala University of Health Sciences
- Principal: Dr. Vijayalakshmi M. T.
- Director: Dr. O. K. Mani
- Undergraduates: 100 seats, with majority SC reservation (almost 70 seats out of 100)
- Location: Palakkad, Kerala, India; 10.751°N 76.594°E
- Administration: Directorate of Medical Education, Government of Kerala
- Website: www.gmcpalakkad.in

Institute of Integrated Medical Science (IIMS) is a medical college established in Palakkad District on 2014 by Government of Kerala, under the management of SC Development Department. The institute is affiliated to KUHS.

== See also ==
- List of medical colleges in India
