= Kallekkad =

Palakkad suburb

- Suburb
- Location in Kerala, India Kallekkad (India)
- Coordinates: 10°49′N 76°39′E
- Country: India
- State: Kerala
- District: Palakkad

Government
  - Body: Pirayiri Panchayat

Languages
  - Official: Malayalam, English
- Time zone: UTC+5:30 (IST)
- PIN: 678 015
- Telephone code: 0491
- Vehicle registration: KL-09
- Parliament constituency: Palakkad
- Assembly constituency: Palakkad

Kallekkad is a suburb of the Palakkad city, Kerala, India. It is located about 9 km (5.6 mi) from the city centre along Palakkad Ponnani road. The Armed Reserve Police Camp of Palakkad district is located in Kallekkad.
