= Puthuppariyaram, Palakkad =

Puthuppariyaram
- Suburb
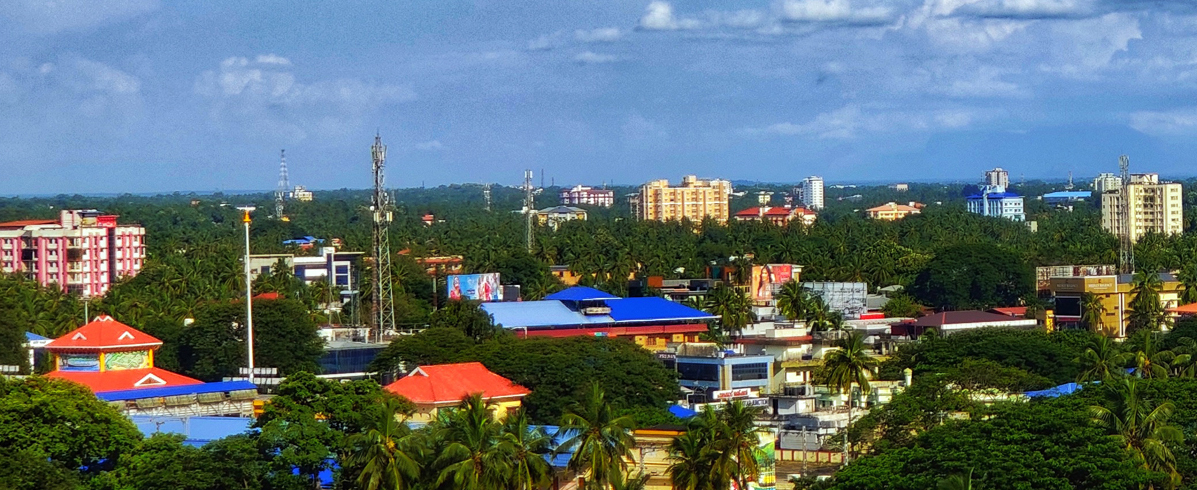
- Palakkad city view from Puthupariyaram
- Interactive map of Puthuppariyaram
- Coordinates: 10.803631°N 76.622086°E
- Country: India
- State: Kerala
- District: Palakkad

Government
  - Body: Puthuppariyaram Panchayat

Area
  - Total: 29.56 km^{2} (11.41 sq mi)

Population (2011)
  - Total: 51,185
  - Density: 1,731.56/km^{2} (4,484.7/sq mi)

Languages
  - Official: Malayalam, English
- Time zone: UTC+5:30 (IST)
- PIN: 678731
- Vehicle registration: KL-9
- Parliament constituency: Palakkad
- Assembly constituency: Malampuzha

Puthuppariyaram is a suburb of Palakkad city, Kerala, India. Puthuppariyaram lies on National Highway 966 and is located about 5 km from district headquarters and 124 km from Kozhikode. Puthuppariyaram Panchayat is one among the Panchayat which is supposed to be part of proposed Palakkad Municipal Corporation.

== Demographics ==
As of 2011 India census, Puthuppariyaram had a population of 51185 with a density of 1731.56 km^{2} over an area of 29.56 Sq. km.
