= Akathethara =

- Suburb
- Location in Kerala, India Akathethara (India)
- Coordinates: 10°49′N 76°39′E
- Country: India
- State: Kerala
- District: Palakkad

Government
  - Body: Akathethara Panchayat

Area
  - Total: 19.79 km^{2} (7.64 sq mi)

Population (2011)
  - Total: 28,592
  - Density: 1,444.77/km^{2} (3,741.9/sq mi)

Languages
  - Official: Malayalam, English
- Time zone: UTC+5:30 (IST)
- PIN: 678 008
- Telephone code: 0491
- Vehicle registration: KL-09
- Civic agency: Akathethara Grama Panchayat 04912555171
- Assembly constituency: Malampuzha
- Website: www.lsgkerala.in/akathetharapanchayat

Akathethara is a census town and suburb of Palakkad city, Kerala, India. It is located about 11 km from the city centre and 5 km from renowned Malampuzha dam. Sabari Ashram also called as Kerala's Sabaramati is located here where Mahatma Gandhi made his visit three times.

== Demographics ==
As of 2011 India census, Akathethara had a population of 28592 with 13862 males and 14730 females.
