= Political divisions of Palakkad district =

Palakkad District has four types of administrative hierarchies:

- Taluk and Village administration managed by the provincial government of Kerala
- Panchayath Administration managed by the local bodies
- Parliament Constituencies for the federal government of India
- Assembly Constituencies for the provincial government of Kerala

The Palakkad district is a political subdivision within the Indian state of Kerala. This district is divided into six taluks and seven municipalities. Palakkad city is located just 50 km away from Coimbatore, which is the second-largest city in Tamil Nadu, only after to Chennai.

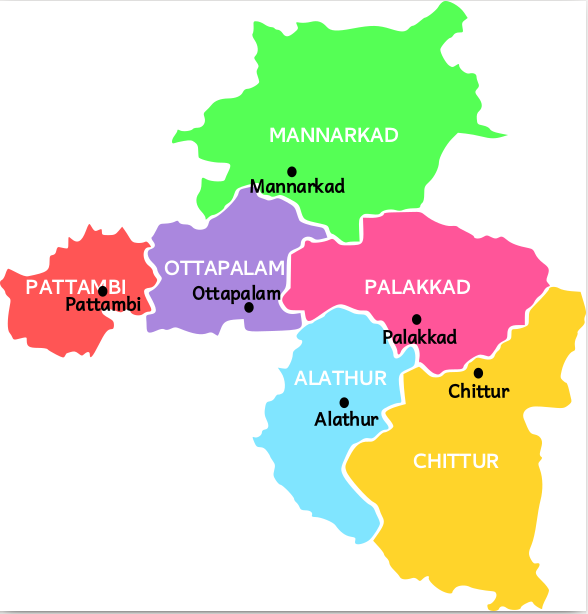
Taluks of Palakkad

== Taluks of Palakkad District ==
The district is divided into six taluks.of which Palakkad Taluk is smallest in area but it is more populated.

Taluk	Population (2011 est.)
Alathur	453425
Chittur	446778
Mannarkkad	418535
Ottappalam	443167
Palakkad	621622
Pattambi	423400
Total	2809934

Palakkad District Overview

An official Census 2011 detail of Palakkad, a district of Kerala has been released by Directorate of Census Operations in Kerala. Enumeration of key persons was also done by census officials in Palakkad District of Kerala.

In 2011, Palakkad had population of 2,809,934 of which male and female were 1,359,478 and 1,450,456 respectively. In 2001 census, Palakkad had a population of 2,617,482 of which males were 1,266,985 and remaining 1,350,497 were females. Palakkad District population constituted 8.41 percent of total Kerala population in the census of 2011. In 2001 census, this figure for Palakkad District was at 8.22 percent of Kerala population.

In the census of 2011 there was change of 7.35 percent in the population compared to population as per 2001. In the previous census of India 2001, Palakkad District recorded increase of 9.88 percent to its population compared to 1991.

The initial provisional data released by census India 2011, shows that density of Palakkad district for 2011 is 627 people per km^{2}. In 2001, Palakkad district density was at 584 people per km^{2}. Palakkad district administers 4,482 square kilometers of areas.

Average literacy rate of Palakkad in 2011 were 89.31 compared to 84.35 of 2001. If things are looked out at gender wise, male and female literacy were 93.10 and 85.79 respectively. For 2001 census, same figures stood at 89.52 and 79.56 in Palakkad District. Total literate in Palakkad District were 2,239,492 of which male and female were 1,122,600 and 1,116,892 respectively. In 2001, Palakkad District had 1,938,818 in its district.

With regards to Sex Ratio in Palakkad, it stood at 1067 per 1000 male compared to 2001 census figure of 1066. The average national sex ratio in India is 940 as per latest reports of Census 2011 Directorate. In 2011 census, child sex ratio is 967 girls per 1000 boys compared to figure of 963 girls per 1000 boys of 2001 census data.

In census enumeration, data regarding child under 0-6 age were also collected for all districts including Palakkad. There were total 302,297 children under age of 0–6 against 318,884 of 2001 census. Of total 302,297 male and female were 153,696 and 148,601 respectively. Child Sex Ratio as per census 2011 was 967 compared to 963 of census 2001. In 2011, Children under 0-6 formed 10.76 percent of Palakkad District compared to 12.18 percent of 2001. There was net change of -1.42 percent in this compared to previous census of India.

Out of the total Palakkad population for 2011 census, 24.09 percent lives in urban regions of district. In total 676,810 people lives in urban areas of which males are 328,012 and females are 348,798. Sex Ratio in urban region of Palakkad district is 1063 as per 2011 census data. Similarly child sex ratio in Palakkad district was 959 in 2011 census. Child population (0–6) in urban region was 70,405 of which males and females were 35,933 and 34,472. This child population figure of Palakkad district is 10.95% of total urban population. Average literacy rate in Palakkad district as per census 2011 is 92.45% of which males and females are 95.43% and 89.67% literates respectively. In actual number 560,597 people are literate in urban region of which males and females are 278,745 and 281,852 respectively.

As per 2011 census, 75.91% population of Palakkad districts lives in rural areas of villages. The total Palakkad district population living in rural areas is 2,133,124 of which males and females are 1,031,466 and 1,101,658 respectively. In rural areas of Palakkad district, sex ratio is 1068 females per 1000 males. If child sex ratio data of Palakkad district is considered, figure is 969 girls per 1000 boys. Child population in the age 0-6 is 231,892 in rural areas of which males were 117,763 and females were 114,129. The child population comprises 11.42% of total rural population of Palakkad district. Literacy rate in rural areas of Palakkad district is 88.31% as per census data 2011. Gender wise, male and female literacy stood at 92.36 and 84.56 percent respectively. In total, 1,678,895 people were literate of which males and females were 843,855 and 835,040 respectively. All details regarding Palakkad District have been processed by us after receiving from Govt. of India. We are not responsible for errors to population census details of Palakkad District.

Urban Agglomerations inside Palakkad District Population Male Female

- Palakkad (Urban Agglomeration) 293,566 143,650 149,916
- Ottapalam (Urban Agglomeration) 238,230

Cities inside Palakkad District Population Male Female

- Palakkad (Municipality) 131,019 63,833 67,186

== Municipalities of Palakkad District ==
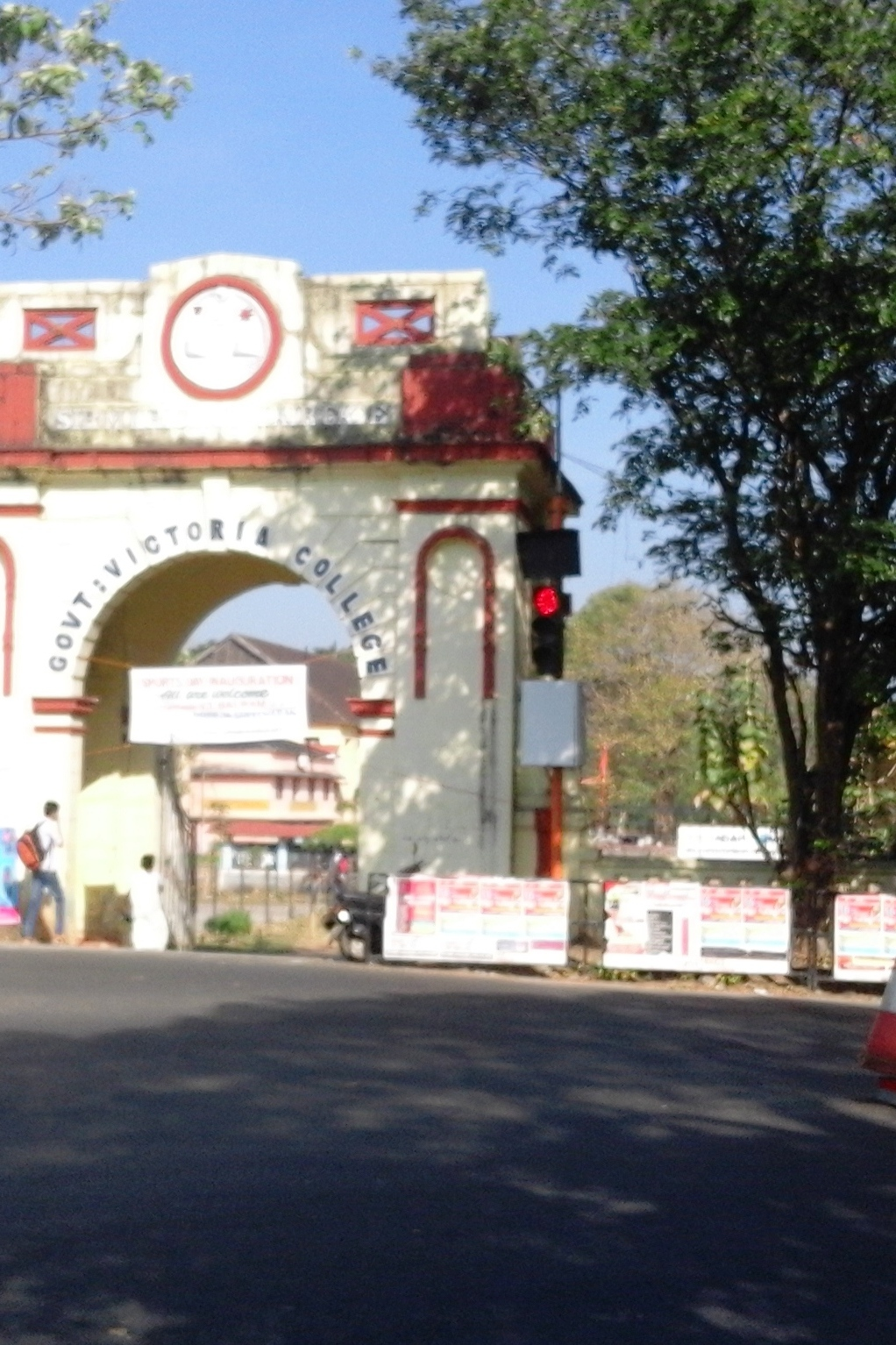
Victoria College, Palakkad

The district includes Seven municipalities, which each belong to a taluk. The largest city in the district is the Palakkad municipality The municipalities, with population estimates for 2011, are:

- Palakkad urban agglomeration (pop. 293000),
- Palakkad city (pop 131465)
- Ottapalam (pop. 53790)
- Shornur (pop. 42022)
- Chittur-Tattamangalam (pop. 31884)
- Pattambi
- Cherpulassery
- Mannarkkad

== Kerala Assembly Seats in Palakkad District as per Legislative Assembly election, 2016 ==
Local bodies incorporated in the legislative assembly constituencies

Legislative Constituency	MLA	Representing Party	Front
Palakkad	Ramesh Pisharody	INC	UDF
Chittur	Sumesh Achuthan	INC	UDF
Nenmara	K Babu	CPI(M)	LDF
Tarur	A.K Balan	CPI(M)	LDF
Mannarkkad	N Shamsudheen	IUML	UDF
Malampuzha	A.Prabhakaran	CPI(M)	LDF
Alathur	K. D. Prasenan	CPI(M)	LDF
Thrithala	M.B.Rajesh	CPI(M)	LDF
Ottapalam	P. Unni	CPI(M)	LDF
Pattambi	Muhammed Muhsin	CPI	LDF
Kongad	K.V Vijayadas	CPI(M)	LDF
Shoranur	P.K Sasi	CPI(M)	LDF

Sreekrishnapuram, Kuzhalmannam and Kollengode Constituencies have been removed and Kongad, Shoranur, Nemmara and Tarur Constituencies were created during the 2011 General Election, as a result of delimitation for the Kerala Legislative Assembly, increasing the total number of seats coming under Palakkad district to 12.

== Palakkad Parliament Constituency ==
Palakkad is a Lok Sabha constituency in Kerala.

=== Assembly segments ===
Palghat Lok Sabha constituency is composed of the following assembly segments:

1. Kongad
2. Mannarkkad
3. Malampuzha
4. Palghat
5. Ottapalam
6. Shoranur
7. Pattambi

=== Members of Parliament ===
- 1957: P. Kunhan, Communist Party of India
- 1962: P. Kunhan, Communist Party of India
- 1967: E.K. Nayanar, Communist Party of India (Marxist)
- 1971: A.K. Gopalan, Communist Party of India (Marxist)
- 1977: A. Sunnasahib, Indian National Congress
- 1980: V.S. Vijayaraghavan, Indian National Congress (I)
- 1984: V.S. Vijayaraghavan, Indian National Congress
- 1989: Vijayaraghavan Alampadan, Communist Party of India (Marxist)
- 1991: V.S. Vijayaraghavan, Indian National Congress
- 1996: N.N. Krishnadas, Communist Party of India (Marxist)
- 1998: N.N. Krishnadas, Communist Party of India (Marxist)
- 1999: N.N. Krishnadas, Communist Party of India (Marxist)
- 2004: N.N. Krishnadas, Communist Party of India (Marxist)
- 2009: M B Rajesh, Communist Party of India (Marxist)
- 2014: M B Rajesh, Communist Party of India (Marxist)
- 2019: V.K.Sreekantan, Indian National Congress

=== Indian general election results ===
2019 Indian general election : Palakkad
Party	Candidate	Votes	%	±%
INC	V.K.SREEKANDAN	3,99,274	38.83%	
CPI(M)	M B Rajesh	3,87,637	37.70%	
BJP	Krishnakumar C	2,18,556	21.26%	
Others	6 candidates	16,118	1.56%	
NOTA	NOTA	6665	0.65%	
Margin of victory		11,637	{{{percentage}}}	{{{change}}}
INC hold		Swing		

== Alathur Parliament Constituency ==
Alathur Lok Sabha constituency is one of the 20 Lok Sabha constituencies in Kerala state in southern India. This constituency came into existence in 2008, following the implementation of delimitation of parliamentary constituencies based on the recommendations of the Delimitation Commission of India constituted in 2002.

=== Assembly segments ===
Alathur Lok Sabha constituency comprises the following seven legislative assembly segments:

1. Tarur
2. Chittur
3. Nemmara
4. Alathur
5. Chelakkara
6. Kunnamkulam
7. Wadakkanchery

Tarur, Chittur, Nemmara and Alathur segments are in Palakkad district and Chelakkara, Kunnamkulam and Wadakkancherry segments are in Thrissur district. Chelakkara, Wadakkancherry and Kunnamkulam segments were earlier in the erstwhile Ottapalam Lok Sabha constituency.

=== Members of Parliament ===
- 2009: P.K Biju, Communist Party of India (Marxist)
- 2014: P.K Biju, Communist Party of India (Marxist)
- 2019: Ramya Haridas Indian National Congress

=== Indian general election, 2019 ===
2019 Indian general election : Alathur
Party	Candidate	Votes	%	±%
INC	RAMYA HARIDAS	5,33,815	52.4%	12.07%
CPI(M)	P K BIJU	3,74,847	36.8%	−7.54%
BDJS	T.V.BABU	89,837	8.82%	
NOTA	NOTA & OTHERS	20,244	1.98%	−−−
Margin of victory		1,58,968		
Turnout		10,19,376	80.47%	
INC hold		Swing		

== Villages ==
- Athicode

== See also ==
- Palakkad district
- Thrissur district
- Ottapalam (Lok Sabha constituency)
- Indian general election, 2014 (Kerala)
