= Sarin P =

Indian politician

Dr. P. Sarin is an Indian politician, physician and former civil servant from Palakkad, Kerala. He served as the Convener of the Kerala Pradesh Congress Committee (KPCC) Digital Media Cell before being expelled from the Indian National Congress in October 2024. He subsequently contested the Palakkad assembly by-election in November 2024 as an independent candidate backed by the Communist Party of India (Marxist)-led Left Democratic Front (LDF), finishing third. Since 2025, he is the strategic advisor to Vijnana Keralam, an initiative to drive Kerala to a knowledge-based economy and to build a skilled workforce in Kerala.

== Early life and education ==
Sarin is a Keralite. He received his MBBS degree from Government Medical College, Kozhikode. He then appeared for the Civil Services Examination, securing the 555th rank.

== Civil service career ==
Sarin cleared the Indian Audit and Accounts Service (IA&AS) in 2009. He was posted in Thiruvananthapuram and later in Karnataka as Deputy Accountant General, before resigning from the central service in 2016 to enter politics. He resigned from the civil service in 2016 to pursue a full-time career in politics.

== Political career ==
=== Indian National Congress ===
After leaving the civil service, Sarin joined the Indian National Congress. In the 2021 Kerala Legislative Assembly election, he was fielded by the Congress as the candidate from the Ottapalam constituency, which falls under the Palakkad Lok Sabha seat. He lost the election by 15,152 votes, but increased the Congress's vote share in the constituency by 3.05 per cent.

Following the resignation of Anil Antony from the Congress in 2023, Sarin was appointed as the Convener of the Kerala Pradesh Congress Committee Digital Media Cell.

=== Expulsion from Congress ===
In October 2024, Sarin publicly criticised the Congress leadership after the party announced Rahul Mamkootathil, the Youth Congress state president, as its candidate for the Palakkad assembly by-election. He had himself sought the ticket and wrote to Congress national leaders Mallikarjun Kharge and Rahul Gandhi opposing Mamkootathil's nomination. Sarin also launched a sharp attack on the Leader of the Opposition V. D. Satheesan, accusing him of having "hijacked" the party and undermined its democratic structure.

On 17 October 2024, the Kerala Pradesh Congress Committee expelled Sarin on disciplinary grounds for anti-party activities.

=== 2024 Palakkad by-election ===
After his expulsion, Sarin was named as the LDF-backed independent candidate for the Palakkad assembly by-election. Following the announcement, he remarked, "I was a Leftist within Congress so far, now I will be a Congressman within the CPM." CPM leader E. P. Jayarajan publicly endorsed Sarin as the ideal candidate for the Left Front in Palakkad.

The by-election was held on 13 November 2024 and the results were declared on 23 November. Sarin finished third with 37,293 votes, behind the Congress's Rahul Mamkootathil (58,389 votes) and the Bharatiya Janata Party's C. Krishnakumar (39,549 votes).

== Personal life ==
Sarin is married to Dr. Soumya Sarin, a senior consultant paediatrician and neonatologist working at Medcare Hospital in Sharjah, United Arab Emirates.
