= Geevarghese =

Geevarghese alongside Varughese, Varghese, Verghese, Varkey, Varughis, and Vergis are Syriac–Malayalam variants of George in India. Geevarghese may refer to:

- Geevarghese I or Baselios Geevarghese I of the East (1870–1928), the second Catholicos of the Malankara Orthodox Syrian Church in India
- Geevarghese II or Baselios Geevarghese II (1874–1964), the third Catholicos of the East of the Malankara Orthodox Church and 16th Malankara Metropolitan
- Geevarghese Dionysius of Vattasseril (1858–1934), Malankara Metropolitan and primate of the Malankara Orthodox Church
- Geevarghese Gregorios (1933–1999), a bishop of the Syriac Orthodox Church, Malankara Metropolitan, President of the Episcopal Synod of the Church in India, President of the Synod of the Malankara Jacobite Syrian Orthodox Church and the Metropolitan of Cochin, Kottayam, Kollam, Niranam and Thumpamon Dioceses
- Geevarghese Gregorios of Parumala (1848–1902), bishop of the Malankara Syrian Church
- Geevarghese Ivanios (1882-1953), the first Metropolitan Archbishop of Trivandrum and the founder of the Syro-Malankara Catholic Reunion Movement
- Geevarghese Mar Osthathios (1918–2012), a senior bishop of the Indian Orthodox Church and Metropolitan of the Niranam diocese in 1975–2007
- Geevarghese Divannasios Ottathengil (1950-2018), a bishop of Syro-Malankara Catholic Eparchy of Puthur from 2010 until 2017
- Geevarghese Panicker, a priest and educationalist of Syro-Malankara Catholic Church
- Geevarghese Mar Philoxenos, an administrator, orator and an advocate of Orthodox and the Catholicate of the Malankara Orthodox Syrian Church of India and Metropolitan of Thumpamon Diocese (1930–1951)
- Geevarghese Mar Philoxenos II (1812-1829) - Malankara Metropolitan and Metropolitan of Malabar Independent Syrian Church
- Geevarghese Mar Timotheos (1928–2019), bishop of Indian Syro-Malankara Catholic, Bishop of Tiruvalla

--

- Athanasios Geevarghese (born 1957), Syriac Orthodox bishop, currently the Abbot of Mor Ignatius Dayro Manjinikkara & Metropolitan of Simhasana Churches of South Kerala
- Divanasios Geevargees, Abbot of Piramadam dayara and Metropolitan of Simhasana churches
- Barnabas Geevarghese, Auxiliary Metropolitan of Niranam Diocese of the Malankara Jacobite Syriac Orthodox Church
- Coorilose Geevarghese, Metropolitan of Niranam Diocese of Malankara Jacobite Syriac Orthodox Church
- Polycarpus Geevarghese (1933–2011), Metropolitan of Evangelistic Association of The East and Honnavar Mission of Jacobite Syrian Orthodox Church
