= Sobha Surendran =

Political leader from Kerala

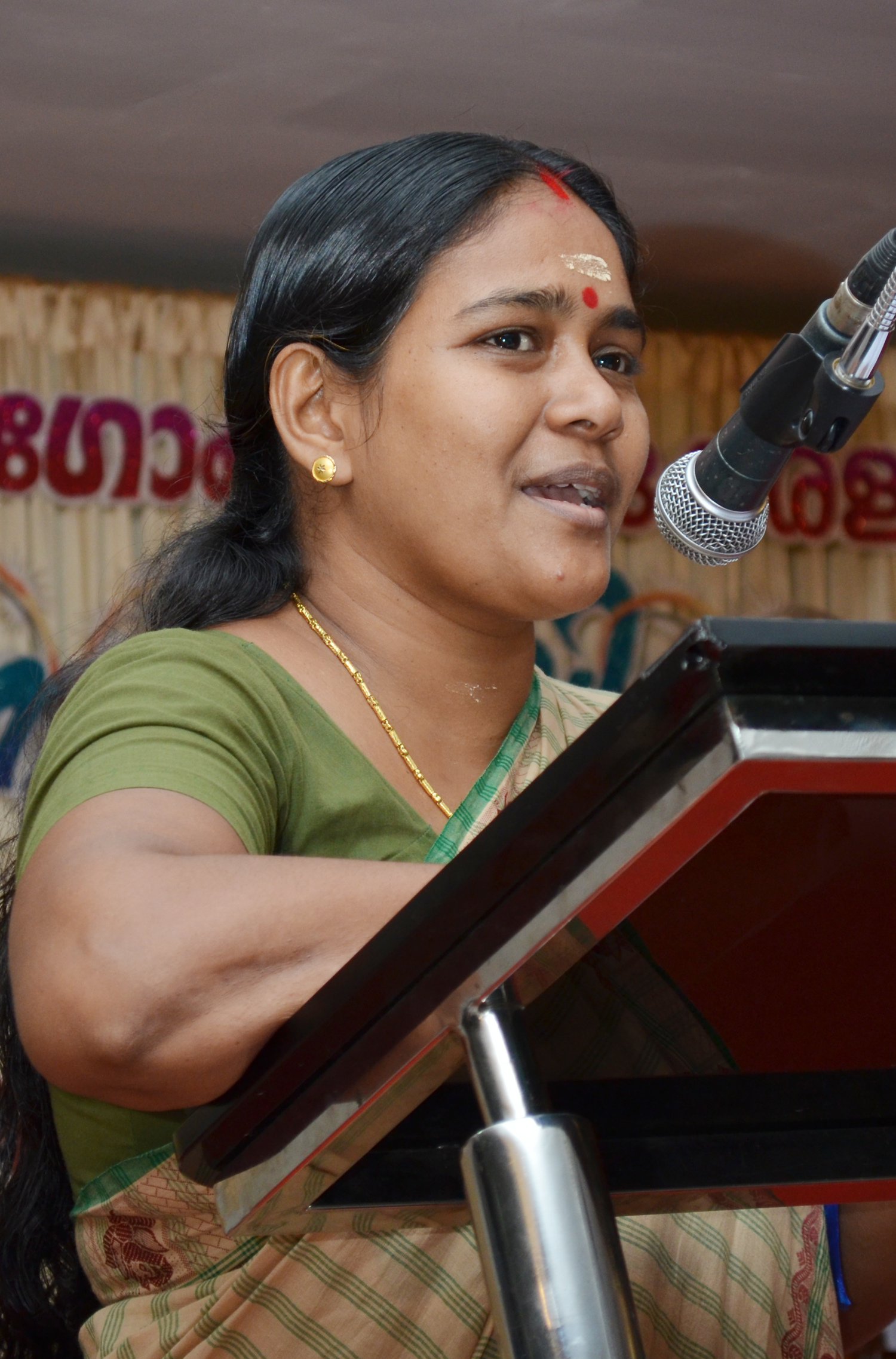

General Secretary of the Bharatiya Janata Party, Kerala

Personal details
- Born: 5 April 1974 (age 52) Wadakkancherry, Thrissur, Kerala
- Party: Bharatiya Janata Party
- Spouse: KK Surendran
- Children: 2
- Education: University of Calicut
- Occupation: Politician; Social worker

Sobha Surendran (born 1974) is an Indian politician from the state of Kerala, affiliated with the Bharatiya Janata Party (BJP). She is also a member of the BJP's National Executive Council and serves as the party's general secretary in Kerala. She is widely recognized for her involvement in various social and political issues. Sobha is regarded as the first woman politician from Kerala to hold a position at the national level within the BJP.

She previously served as the state president of the BJP Mahila Morcha. Known for her dynamic oratory skills and grassroots connections, Sobha has increased the BJP's vote share in every election she has contested.

She also serves on the board of directors of the Chennai Petroleum Corporation.

== Early life ==
Sobha was born into an Ezhava family, the largest Hindu community in Kerala, in Wadakkancherry, Thrissur district, Kerala.

She is married to K. K. Surendran, a Bharatiya Janata Party politician from Malappuram.

She lost her father while she was still in school, a deeply challenging experience that significantly shaped her early life. Despite this hardship, she became associated with the Rashtriya Swayamsevak Sangh at the age of 13.

== Political career ==
Sobha Surendran began her political journey with the Bharatiya Janata Party (BJP) after her involvement with the Rashtriya Swayamsevak Sangh (RSS) and her activities with the Akhil Bharatiya Vidyarthi Parishad. She transitioned to become a full-time BJP worker in the early 1990s at a time when the BJP had not yet seen electoral success in Kerala.

Over her career spanning more than three decades, Sobha has held various positions within BJP, including Bharatiya Janata Yuva Morcha District Vice President, Yuvamorcha State Vice President, Mahila Morcha State Secretary, Mahila Morcha State President (2010–2016), BJP State Secretary, BJP National Executive Member (2015–2021), BJP State General Secretary (2016–2020), BJP State Vice President (2020–present), and BJP State Core Committee Member* (2016–present).

During her tenure as the State President of Mahila Morcha, Sobha was pivotal in establishing BJP women's wing units across all 140 assembly constituencies in Kerala. Under her leadership, the organization not only expanded its reach but also gained significant public support, transforming into a formidable advocate for women's rights. Her leadership was marked by grassroots campaigns that addressed various issues faced by women, thereby enhancing her profile and making her a prominent figure in Kerala politics.

On 12 July 2025, Sobha Surendran has been appointed as the BJP Kerala General Secretary in Thrissur by BJP Kerala.

== Elections ==
In 2004 By-Election in Wadakkancherry Assembly Constituency due to resignation of Adv. V Balaram of Indian National Congress, Sobha Surendran contested as BJP candidate against A.C Moideen of CPI(M) and K. Muraleedharan of Indian National Congress and came third with 10,643 votes.

In 2006 Legislative Assembly Election, Sobha contested from Ponnani Assembly constituency against Paloli Mohammedkutty of CPI(M) and M.P Gangadharan of DIC and came third with 13810 votes.

In 2009 By-Election in Ernakulam Assembly Constituency due to resignation of K Sudhakaran, Sobha Surendran contested against Dominic Presentation of Indian National Congress and PN Seenulal of CPI(M) and came third with 7,208 votes.

In 2011 Legislative Assembly Election, Sobha contested from Puthukkad Assembly constituency against C. Raveendranath of CPI(M) and K. P. Vishwanathan of Indian National Congress and came third with 14,425 votes.

In 2014 General Election, Sobha contested the Palakkad constituency and came third against M.B Rajesh of the CPI(M). In 2009 BJP got 68,804 votes and in 2014 BJP got 1,36,587 votes in Palakkad, increasing the BJP's vote percentage by 6.3%.

In 2016 Legislative Assembly Election, there was a close contest and she came second with 40,087 votes. Sobha, as the party's state general secretary, was then contesting both legislative assembly and general elections on a BJP ticket.

Over the years her election results have been improving the party vote share.

In 2019 General Election, Sobha contested the Attingal constituency and came third against Adoor Prakash of the Indian National Congress. In 2014 BJP got 92,000 votes and in 2019 BJP got 248,000 votes in Attingal.

In 2021 Legislative Assembly Election, Sobha Surendran contested the Kazhakkoottam constituency in the Thiruvananthapuram district and lost to Kadakampally Surendran CPI(M) candidate.

In 2024 General Election, she contested from Alappuzha constituency and lost. She managed to make Alappuzha an "A-class" constituency for the BJP, increasing the vote share by 11%. She even managed to finish a very close second (less than 2K votes) in 2 assembly segments of the constituency.

In the 2026 Kerala Legislative Assembly election, Sobha Surendran contested the Palakkad Assembly constituency as BJP candidate. Sobha Surendran received 49,052 votes (33.33%), finishing second behind Indian National Congress candidate Ramesh Pisharody, who received 62,199 votes (42.26%). Pisharody won the constituency by a margin of 13,147 votes. Independent candidate N. M. R. Razack finished third with 33,931 votes (23.05%).

Election candidature history
Election	Year	Constituency	Opponent		Result	Margin	Position
Lok Sabha	2014	Palakkad	CPI(M)	M. B. Rajesh	Lost	276,310	Third
Lok Sabha	2019	Attingal	INC	Adoor Prakash	Lost	132,914	Third
Lok Sabha	2024	Alappuzha	INC	K. C. Venugopal	Lost	104,912	
Kerala Legislative Assembly	2004 By-Election	Wadakkanchery	CPI(M)	A. C. Moideen	Lost	46,088	Third
Kerala Legislative Assembly	2006	Ponnani	CPI(M)	Paloli Mohammed Kutty	Lost	48,208	Third
Kerala Legislative Assembly	2009 By-Election	Ernakulam	INC	Dominic Presentation	Lost	38,911	Third
Kerala Legislative Assembly	2011	Puthukkad	CPI(M)	C. Raveendranath	Lost	58,622	Runner Up
Kerala Legislative Assembly	2016	Palakkad	INC	Shafi Parambil	Lost	17,483	Runner Up
Kerala Legislative Assembly	2021	Kazhakootam	CPI(M)	Kadakampally Surendran	Lost	23,497	Runner Up
Kerala Legislative Assembly	2026	Palakkad	INC	Ramesh Pisharody	Lost	13,147	Runner Up

== Protests and struggles ==
Sobha Surendran was one of the key figures arrested by police in the Sabarimala protests. She fasted for 48 hours in support of the agitation by PSC job seekers in the PSC rank lists in the Secretariat. Subsequently, Sobha met with the Kerala Governor and received assurances that he would act in favor of the job aspirants.

In November 2020, Sobha alleged that the party president, K. Surendran, had organised a political conspiracy against her, both personally and politically, to end her political career. She wrote a complaint letter to BJP national president JP Nadda and union home minister Amit Shah.
