= St. George's Jacobite Church, Cheppad =

Church in Cheppad, India

St. George's Church, Cheppad (founded 1924), is a church in a village known as Cheppad or Cheppaud in Alappuzha district of Kerala state of India. St. George's Church in Cheppad belongs to the Niranam Diocese of the Malankara Archdiocese, under the supreme ecclesiastical jurisdiction of the Syriac Orthodox Church, headed by Syriac Orthodox Patriarch of Antioch and all the East.
