= Pirayiri =

- Suburb
- Location in Kerala, India Pirayiri (India)
- Coordinates: 10°46′15″N 76°37′45″E
- Country: India
- State: Kerala
- District: Palakkad

Government
  - Type: Panchayat
  - Body: Pirayiri Panchayat

Area
  - Total: 18.69 km^{2} (7.22 sq mi)

Population (2011)
  - Total: 41,359
  - Density: 2,213/km^{2} (5,731/sq mi)

Languages
  - Official: Malayalam, English
- Time zone: UTC+5:30 (IST)
- PIN: 678019
- Telephone code: 0491
- Vehicle registration: KL-09
- Parliament constituency: Palakkad
- Assembly constituency: Palakkad
- Climate: Hot and humid varies from 30 Degree celsius to 40 degree celsius. (Köppen)

Pirayiri (also spelled Pirayari) is a residential and commercial area in Palakkad city. It is located about 6 km (3.7 mi) from the city centre. It belongs to Pirayiri grama panchayat in the Palakkad district, state of Kerala, India.

== Demographics ==
As of 2011 India census, Pirayiri had a population of 41,359 with a density of 2212.89 km^{2} over an area of 18.69 Sq. km.
