= Barnabas Geevarghese =

Syriac Orthodox bishop (born 1953)

His Eminence Mor Dr. Geevarghese Barnabas
- Auxiliary Metropolitan of Niranam Diocese
- Church: Malankara Jacobite Syriac Orthodox Church
- Diocese: Niranam
- See: Holy Apostolic See of Antioch & All East

Orders
- Ordination: 1982 (Kassisso)
- Consecration: 1 February 2010 by Baselios Thomas I Catholicos

Personal details
- Born: May 29, 1953 Ranni, Kerala, India
- Education: Catholicate College Pathanamthitta (BA, Econ.); Orthodox Theological Seminary, Kottayam (GST); Serampore University (BD); Saint Vladimir's Orthodox Theological Seminary (Theology); Doctorate

Mor Barnabas Geevarghese is the auxiliary metropolitan of Niranam Diocese of the Malankara Jacobite Syriac Orthodox Church.

== Education ==
- B.A in Economics from Catholicate College Pathanamthitta
- B.Div. from Serampore University
- G.S.T from Orthodox Theological Seminary, Kottayam
- Post Graduation in Theology from Saint Vladimir's Orthodox Theological Seminary
- Doctorate

== See also ==
- Syriac Orthodox Church – Oriental Orthodox Church
- Saint Thomas Christians – Indian ethnoreligious group
