= N. N. Krishnadas =

Indian politician

Member of Parliament, Lok Sabha
- In office 1996–2009
- Preceded by: V. S. Vijayaraghavan
- Succeeded by: M. B. Rajesh
- Constituency: Palakkad

Personal details
- Born: 12 March 1959 (age 67) Palakkad, Kerala, India
- Party: CPI(M)
- Spouse: K. Geetha (m.20 March 1992)

N. N. Krishnadas (born 12 March 1959) was a member of the 12th, 13th and 14th Lok Sabha of India. He represented the Palakkad constituency of Kerala and is a state committee member of the Communist Party of India (Marxist).

During the 2008 Mumbai attacks he was a victim of hostage situation at Mumbai's Taj Mahal Palace Hotel. He was taken to Azad Nagar police station where he was interviewed by The Telegraph regarding his ordeal there. Krishnadas has told the newspaper that two masked men ran in with machine guns as he was about to order from the menu in the restaurant which was part of a hotel. He ducked under the table, and spent time there in fear and shock, until the employee told him and other visitors about the emergency exit. He was liberated around 8:30 am. Before that, he also witnessed how two foreigners, who tried to escape, got gunned down by the attackers and even heard an explosion.

In 2016 he was chosen as a candidate for CPI(M) in Palakkad assembly constituency to run against Shafi Parambil, but lost in the due run.
