= Catholicate College, Pathanamthitta =

College in Kerala

Coordinates: 9.2594°N 76.7805°E

Catholicate College Pathanamthitta
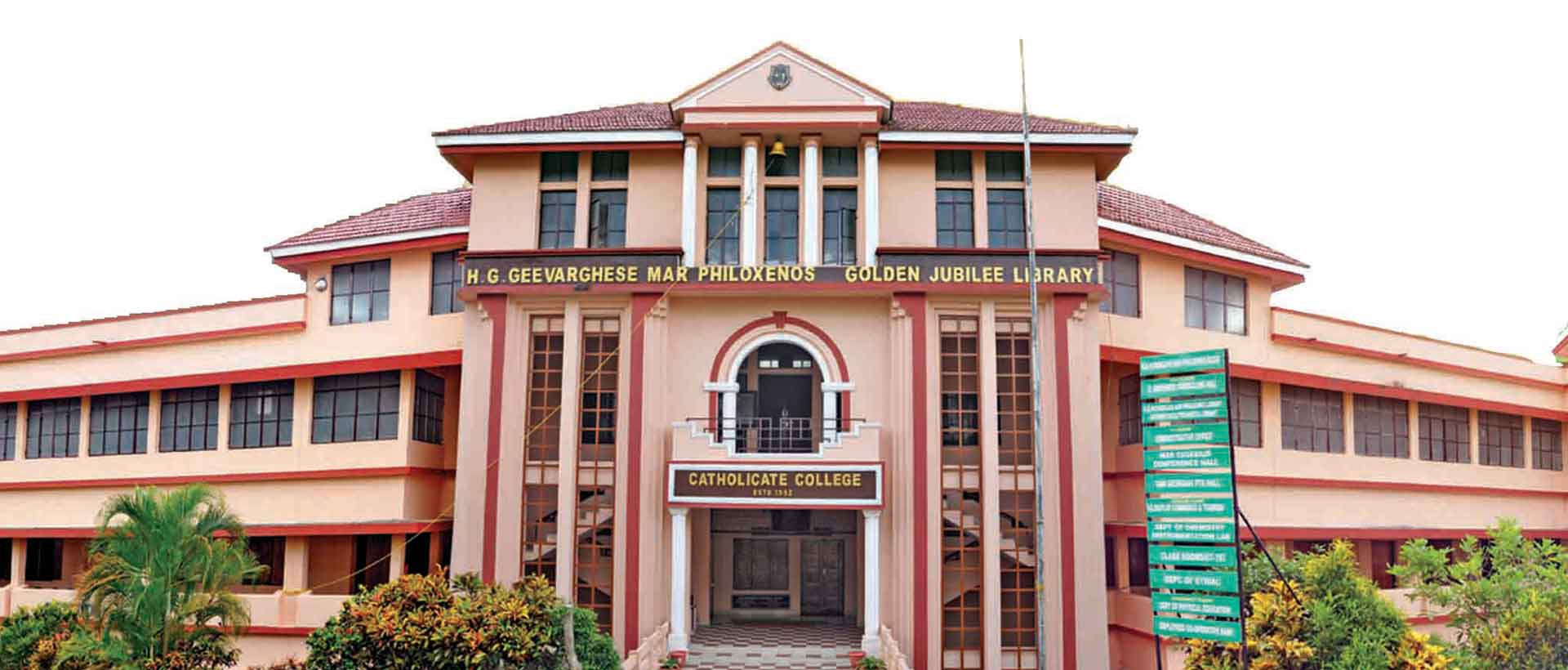
- Motto: "Fear Of the Lord is the Beginning of Wisdom"
- Established: 1952; 74 years ago
- Principal: Prof. Renny P Varghese
- Faculty: 110
- Students: 2000
- Undergraduates: 1200 (2005)
- Postgraduates: 120
- Location: Pathanamthitta, Kerala, India
- Campus: Rural

Catholicate College, Pathanamthitta, established in 1952, is an institution of higher education at Pathanamthitta of Kerala, India. Catholicate College belongs to the first group of colleges in Kerala to receive academic accreditation from the National Assessment and Accreditation Council (NAAC). In the fourth cycle of (NAAC) re-accreditation, the college has been re-accredited by NAAC in A++ grade with CGPA of 3.53. The college is owned by Malankara Orthodox Church, founded by Catholicos Baselios Geevarghese II. The college was originally planned by Geevarghese Philoxenos, Metropolitan; it was founded in 1952, after his death, by Daniel Philoxenos Metropolitan, who became the first principal of the college.

As of June 2026, the principal is Prof. Renny P Varghese. Prior to his appointment as principal, he served as the principal of the K. G College,Pampady. The college is affiliated with Mahatma Gandhi University, Kottayam.

== Academics ==
The college has 2,000 students. It has 110 teaching and 67 administrative staff on its rolls. There are degree courses in English, Malayalam, Hindi, economics, history, mathematics, physics, chemistry, botany, zoology, commerce & tourism, computer application. The college has research facilities in the departments of Malayalam, Hindi, zoology, botany, physics and mathematics.

The college has a study center of the Indira Gandhi National Open University.

== Donations ==
NSS, Bhoomitrasena club and staff club of the college donated 14 houses to the poor.

== Courses ==
The college has four UGC-sponsored career oriented add-on courses:

- Computer Technology (Department Of Physics)
- Video Production and Science Communication (Department Of Chemistry)
- Lab Technology Medical (Department Of Zoology)
- Yoga & Stress Management (Department Of Physical Education)

The Physics department has two US-based student chapters:

- S P I E (Society of Photo optical Instrumentation Engineers)
- O.S.A (Optical society of America)

The college has an A++ accreditation from NAAC (as per revision in 2023)

== Principals ==
- Daniel Mar Philexinos Metropolitan (P.E. Daniel Ramban) (1952–53)
- N. M. Zernov, Britain (1953–54)
- Peter S. Wright, Britain (1954–55)
- Ninan Abraham (1955–57)
- Puthencavu Mathen Tharakan (1957–58)
- E. T. Mathew (1958–59)
- T. B. Ninan (1959–61)
- J. Alexander (1963–75)
- V. T. Thomas (1975–76)
- C. N. Mathew (1976)
- Dr. Paul C. Varghese (1976–83)
- N.G.Kunjachen (1983)
- Dr. T. A. George (1983–92)
- V. I. Joseph (1992–93)
- K.C John (1993–99)
- E. Jacob John (1999–2001)
- Abraham George (2001–2002)
- K T Mathewkutty (2002–2005)
- Prasad Thomas (2005–2006)
- George Eapen (2006–2007)
- Saramma Varghese (2007–2010)
- George Varghese Koppara (2010- 2014)
- Mathew P Joseph (2014- 2021)
- Philipose Omman (2021- 2023)
- Sunil Jacob (2023–2024)
- Sindu Jones (2024–present)

== Departments ==
- English
- Malayalam
- Hindi
- Syriac
- Economics
- Commerce & Tourism
- Computer Application
- Mathematics
- Physics
- Chemistry
- Botany
- Zoology
- Physical Education

== Notable alumni ==
- Padma Shri Thekkethil Kochandy Alex
- Captain Raju, actor and former Indian Army officer
- Rahul Mamkootathil, MLA, Palakkad
- Benyamin, writer
- S. Ramesan Nair, lyricist and poet
- P. D. T. Achary, former secretary general of Lok Sabha

== Notable faculty ==
- Veena George, minister for health & family welfare, Government of Kerala
- Madhu Eravankara, notable film director, film critic and author
