= T. K. Alex =

Director of the Indian Space Research Organisation

- Citizenship: Indian
- Education: Catholicate College Pathanamthitta, Kerala University, Indian Institute of Technology Madras (IITM), Indian Institute of Science (IISc), T.K.M. College of Engineering, Kollam
- Awards: Padma Shri (2007)
- Scientific career
- Fields: Electrical and Aerospace Engineering
- Workplaces: Indian Space Research Organisation

Thekkethil Kochandy Alex is an Indian space scientist. He was the director of the ISRO Satellite Centre (ISAC) of Indian Space Research Organisation (ISRO) (2008–2012) and Member, Space Commission. He specialized in electro-optic systems and satellite technology. Starting with the first Indian satellite Aryabhata, he has been responsible for the sensor systems in all the Indian satellites. Under his leadership the Laboratory for Electro Optics Systems (LEOS) was established in 1993 and from the inception he was its director till 2008. He was conferred "Dr. Vikram Sarabhai Distinguished Professorship" in 2011.

== Education ==
Alex from Kerala studied at the SRVLP school, Azhoor, Pathanamthitta, and his high school studies were at the Catholicate High School. This was followed by the pre-university course at the Catholicate College Pathanamthitta, Kerala. He studied at the T.K.M. College of Engineering, Kollam, from 1964 to 1969. He received his bachelor's degree in electrical engineering from the Kerala University (gold medallist), master's degree from IIT Madras and doctorate from IISc Bangalore in Aerospace Engineering.

== Contributions to ISRO/India ==
Alex has contributed to Indian Space Research Organisation (ISRO) by establishing the Laboratory for Electro-Optics Systems in Bangalore. Alex was the project director of the remote sensing experiment on board the Indo-soviet crewed mission in which the first Indian astronaut, Rakesh Sharma, squadron leader, flew aboard Soyuz T-11, launched on 3 April 1984. He contributed to India to the first Indian Moon mission, Chandrayaan-1 in 2008. He provided guidance to the inter-planetary mission, Mars Orbiter mission, Mangalyaan.

== Awards and recognition ==
Alex was awarded the Padma Shri in 2007, and the Distinguished Achievement Award of ISRO in 1976 for his contributions for the first Indian satellite. Other awards received include the IMDA award for the development of infrared sensors and the Hari Om Ashram Vikram Sarbhai award (1987). He received the Aryabhata Award (2015) of the Astronautical Society of India. He is a fellow of the Indian National Academy of Engineering (INAE), National Academy of Science, India (NASI) and the Institution of Electronics and Telecommunication Engineering, India (IETE) and a life member of ASI and Instrument Society of India. He is a fellow of the Optical Society of India and he was its President (2010–11).
