= V. K. Sreekandan =

Indian politician

V. K. Sreekandan MP

Member of Parliament, Lok Sabha
- Incumbent
- Assumed office 23 May 2019
- Preceded by: M. B. Rajesh
- Constituency: Palakkad

Personal details
- Born: 27 February 1970 (age 56) Thrissur, Kerala, India
- Party: Indian National Congress
- Spouse: K. A. Thulasi
- Parents: M. Kochukrishnan Nair; Karthiyayani Amma

Vellalath Kochukrishnan Nair Sreekandan is an Indian politician from Kerala and a member of the Indian National Congress. V. K. Sreekandan is the former president of the Palakkad district Congress Committee. Sreekandan was also a Member of Parliament of the 17th Lok Sabha of India from Palakkad Lok Sabha constituency. Sreekandan was also elected as Member of Parliament of the 18th Lok Sabha of India from the same constituency. Sreekandan is appointed the interim president of Thrissur District Congress Committee following the controversies of K. Muraleedharan's defeat in Thrissur Lok Sabha constituency in 2024 general election.
