= Palakkad Assembly constituency =

Constituency of the Kerala legislative assembly in India

Palakkad
- Constituency No. 56 for the Kerala Legislative Assembly
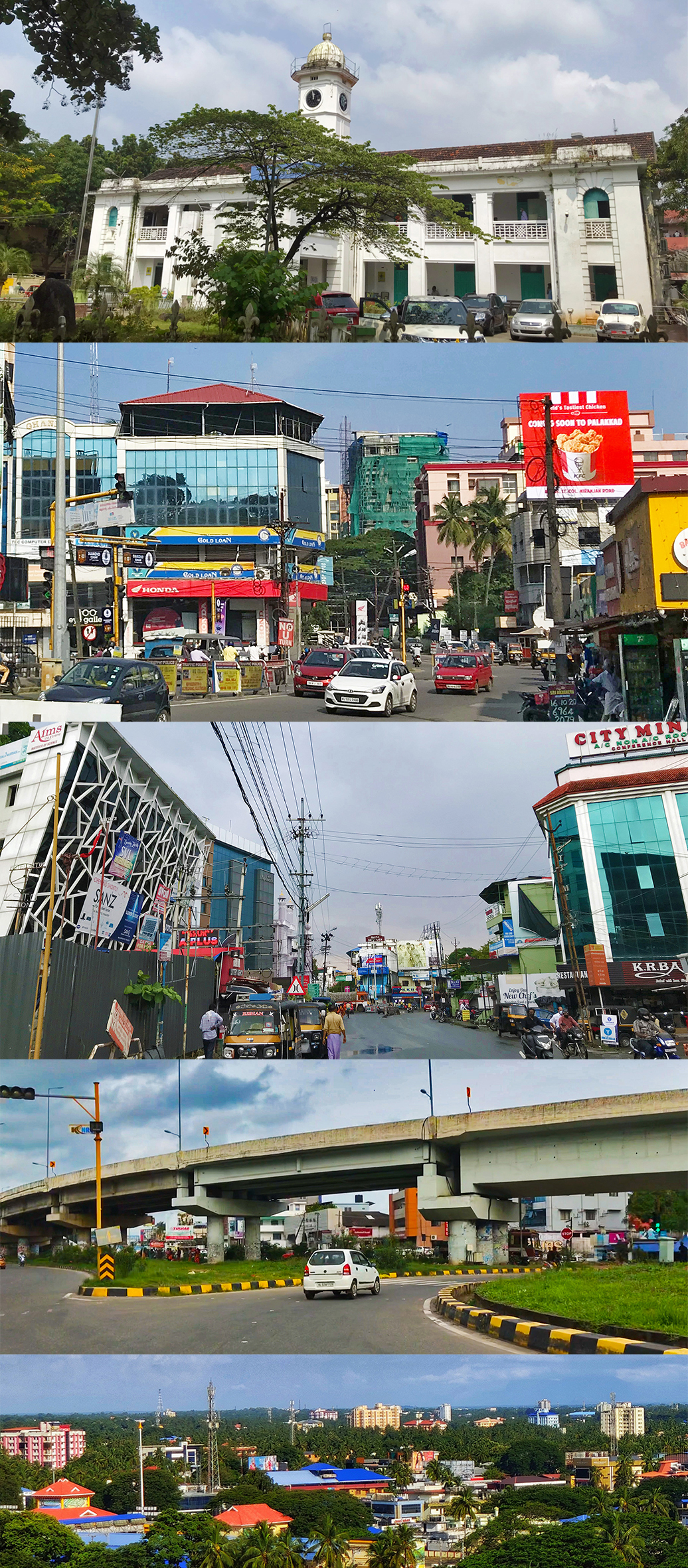
- From top clockwise: IMA Junction, near KSRTC Bus Stand, Chandranagar roundabout, aerial view from Olavakkode, Palakkad City night view

Constituency details
- Country: India
- Region: South India
- State: Kerala
- District: Palakkad
- Established: 1951
- Total electors: 1,94,706 (2024)
- Reservation: None

Member of Legislative Assembly
- 16th Kerala Legislative Assembly
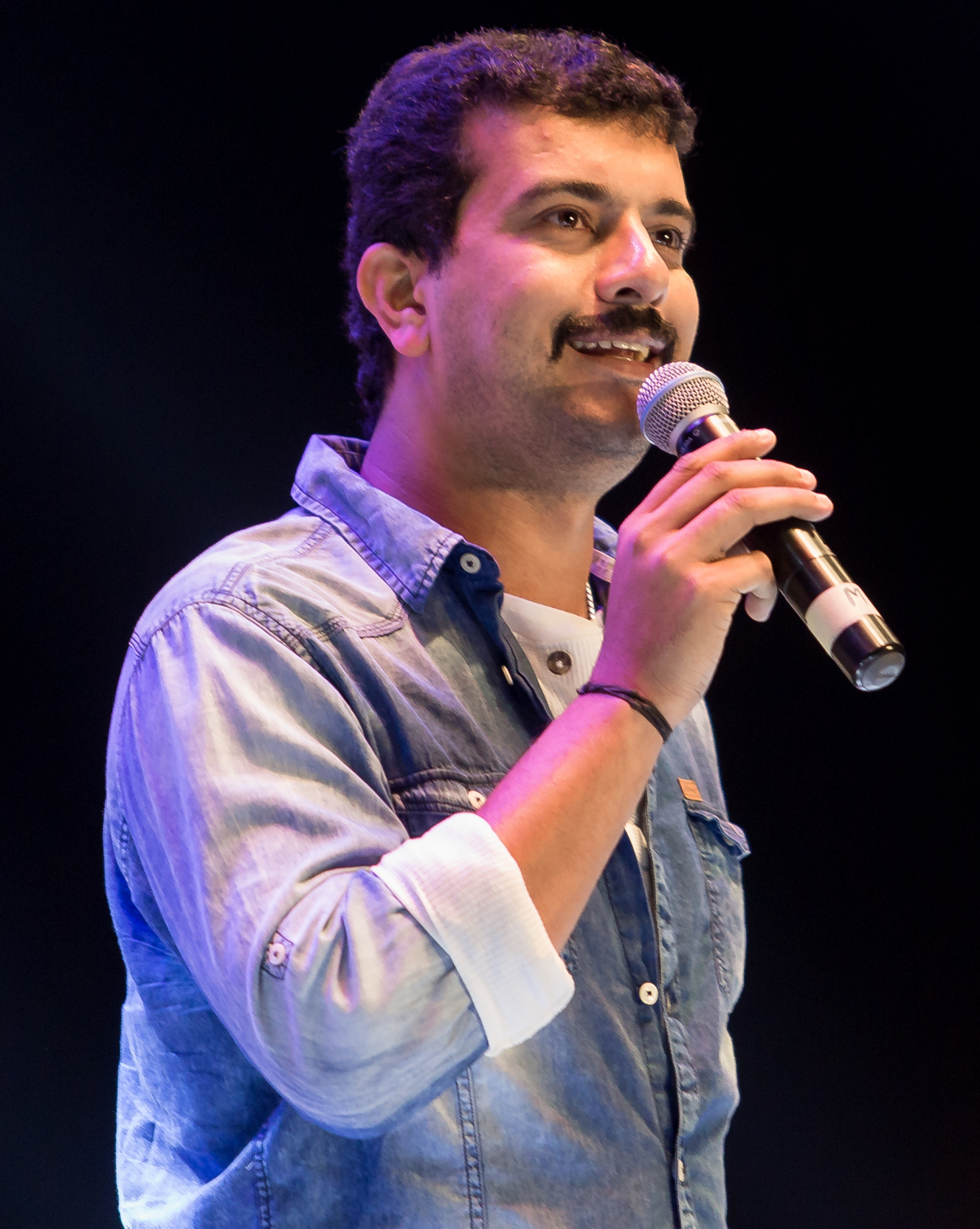
- Incumbent Ramesh Pisharody
- Party: INC
- Alliance: UDF
- Elected year: 2026

Palakkad Assembly constituency, formerly known as Palghat Assembly constituency, is one of the 140 state legislative assembly constituencies in Kerala in southern India. It is also one of the seven state legislative assembly constituencies included in Palakkad Lok Sabha constituency.

== Local self-governed segments ==
Palakkad Assembly constituency is composed of the following local self-governed segments:

Sl no.	Name	Status (Gram panchayat/municipality)	Taluk
1	Palakkad	Municipality	Palakkad
2	Kannadi	Grama panchayat	Palakkad
3	Pirayiri	Grama panchayat	Palakkad
4	Mathur	Grama panchayat	Alathur

== Members of the Legislative Assembly ==
The following list contains all members of Kerala Legislative Assembly who have represented Palakkad Assembly constituency during the period of various assemblies:

Election	Niyama Sabha	Name	Party	Tenure
Madras State
1952	1st	K. Ramakrishnan	Independent politician	1952 – 1957
Kerala State
1957	1st	R. Raghava Menon	Indian National Congress	1957 – 1960
1960	2nd	R. Raghava Menon	Indian National Congress	1960 – 1965
1967	3rd	R. Krishnan	Communist Party of India	1967 – 1970
1970	4th	R. Krishnan	Communist Party of India	1970 – 1977
1977	5th	C. M. Sundaram	Praja Socialist Party	1977 – 1980
1980	6th	C. M. Sundaram	Praja Socialist Party	1980 – 1982
1982	7th	C. M. Sundaram	Praja Socialist Party	1982 – 1987
1987	8th	C. M. Sundaram	Praja Socialist Party	1987 – 1991
1991	9th	C. M. Sundaram	Indian National Congress	1991 – 1996
1996	10th	T. K. Noushad	Communist Party of India	1996 – 2001
2001	11th	K. Sankaranarayanan	Indian National Congress	2001 – 2006
2006	12th	K. K. Divakaran	Communist Party of India	2006 – 2011
2011	13th	Shafi Parambil	Indian National Congress	2011 – 2016
2016	14th	Shafi Parambil	Indian National Congress	2016 – 2021
2021	15th	Shafi Parambil	Indian National Congress	2021 – 2024
2024^	15th	Rahul Mamkootathil	Indian National Congress	2024 – 2026
2026	16th	Ramesh Pisharody	Indian National Congress	2026 – present

^by-election

== Election history ==
Election	Votes polled	Winner				Runner-up 1				Runner-up 2				Margin of victory	
Year		Name	Party	Votes		Name	Party	Votes		Name	Party	Votes		Votes	Percent
2026	147192	Ramesh Pisharody	INC	62199	42.26%	Sobha Surendran	BJP	49052	33.33%	N.M.R. Razack	LDF	33931	23.05%	13,147	8.93%
2024*	138120 (70.93%)	Rahul Mamkootathil	INC	58389	44.27%	C. Krishnakumar	BJP	39549	28.63%	P. Sarin	LDF	37293	24.52%	18,840	13.64 %
2021	142104	Shafi Parambil	INC	54079	38.06%	E. Sreedharan	BJP	50220	35.34%	C. P. Pramod	CPI(M)	36433	25.64%	3859	2.71 %
2016	137804 (77.25%)	Shafi Parambil	INC	57559	41.77%	Sobha Surendran	BJP	40076	29.08%	N. N. Krishnadas	CPI(M)	38675	28.07%	17483	12.69%
2011	112347 (72.78%)	Shafi Parambil	INC	47641	42.41%	K. K. Divakaran	CPI(M)	40238	35.82%	C. Udaybhaskar	BJP	22317	19.86%	7403	6.59%
Major delimitation of constituency
2006	111346 (71.60%)	K. K. Divakaran	CPI(M)	41166	36.97%	A. V. Gopinathan	INC	39822	35.76%	O. Rajagopal	BJP	27667	24.85%	1344	1.21%
2001	110964 (68.05%)	K. Sankaranarayanan	INC	53831	48.51%	T. K. Noushad	CPI(M)	43026	38.77%	Rema Raghunandan	BJP	12159	10.96%	10805	9.74%
1996	89872 (62.06%)	T. K. Noushad	CPI(M)	39198	43.20%	C. M. Sundaram	INC	38602	42.54%	S. R. Balasubramanian	BJP	11446	12.61%	596	0.66%
1991	91895 (66.34%)	C. M. Sundaram	INC	41432	45.09%	M.S. Gopalakrishnan	CPI(M)	37925	41.27%	T. M. P. Iyer	BJP	10648	11.59%	3507	3.82%
1987	87434 (76.18%)	C. M. Sundaram	Ind.	38774	44.35%	Girija Surendran	CPI(M)	32709	37.41%	V. S. Muthuswamy	BJP	12489	14.28%	6065	6.94%
1982	65246 (68.47%)	C. M. Sundaram	Ind.	29011	44.46%	N. A. Kareem	Ind.	25841	39.61%	O. Rajagopal	BJP	9554	14.64%	3170	4.86%
1980	62884 (60.57%)	C. M. Sundaram	Ind.	35902	57.09%	K. A. Chandran	INC(U)	25695	40.86%	C. K. Chinnan Master	Ind.	1099	1.75%	10207	16.23%
1977	60315 (74.92%)	C. M. Sundaram	Ind.	30160	50.00%	R. Krishnan	CPI(M)	27357	45.36%	V. R. Purushothaman	Ind.	1121	1.86%	2803	4.65%
Major delimitation of constituency
1970	57068 (69.92%)	R. Krishnan	CPI(M)	23113	40.50%	A. Chandran Nair	Ind.	17653	30.93%	O. Rajagopal	BJS	15646	27.42%	5460	9.57%
1967	45494 (68.75%)	R. Krishnan	CPI(M)	24627	54.13%	K. Sankaranarayanan	INC	14996	32.96%	O. Rajagopal	BJS	4649	10.22%	9631	21.17%
1965	42804 (66.23%)	M. V. Vasu	CPI(M)	17747	41.46%	K. Pyarijan Sunna Saheb	INC	13260	30.98%	P. K. Krishnaswamy	Ind.	5279	12.33%	4487	10.48%
Major delimitation of constituency
1960	51334 (80.64%)	R. Raghava Menon	INC	26546	51.71%	K. C. Gopalanunni	CPI	24788	48.29%	Only two candidates contested				1758	3.42%
1957	35179 (59.31%)	R. Raghava Menon	INC	14873	42.28%	M. P. Kunhiraman	CPI	14248	40.50%	C. K. Moosath	Ind.	6058	17.22%	625	1.78%
Madras State
1952	45555 (59.29%)	K. Ramakrishnan	Ind.	26469	58.10%	P. Vasu Menon	INC	14342	31.48%	V. Echara Menon	Ind.	2484	5.45%	12127	26.62%

== Detailed election results ==
=== 2025 ===
Segments	LDF	NDA	UDF	IND	SDPI	WPI	AAP		Leading alliance
Palakkad	18941	26933	26316	3685	461	1499	12	77847	NDA
Kannadi	7750	2986	6013	406	0	0	238	17393	LDF
Pirayiri	10504	5189	10936	2603	0	128	0	27510	UDF
Mathur	8040	2894	6309	460	0	0	0	17703	LDF
Total	43385	38002	49574	7154	461	1627	250	140453	
%	30.88933665	27.05673784	35.2957929	5.093518828	0.3282236762	1.158394623	0.177995486		

=== Assembly elections ===
Percentage change (±%) denotes the change in the number of votes from the immediate previous election.

=== 2026 ===
2026 Kerala Legislative Assembly election: Palakkad
Party	Candidate	Votes	%	±%
INC	Ramesh Pisharody	62,199	42.26	▼2.01
BJP	Sobha Surendran	49,052	33.33	▲4.70
Independent	N. M. R. Razack	33,931	23.05	▼2.39
AAP	Udayan Sukumaran	437	0.3	
BSP	Krishnankutty K	348	0.24	
NOTA	None of the above	841	0.57	▼0.34
Margin of victory		13,147	8.93	▼4.71
Turnout		1,47,192		
INC hold		Swing	▼2.01	

By local self-governed segment:

Status (Gram panchayat/municipality)	Votes		
Status (Gram panchayat/municipality)	Ramesh Pisharody	Sobha Surendran	NMR Razack
Palakkad	33,409	31,075	15,684
Pirayiri	15,486	7,260	6,246
Mathur	6,510	4,578	5,878
Kannadi	5,974	5,279	5,724
Postal Ballots	820	860	399

=== 2024 by-election ===
There were 1,94,706 eligible voters in Palakkad Assembly constituency for the 2024 by-election.

2024 Kerala Legislative Assembly by-election: Palakkad
Party	Candidate	Votes	%	±%
INC	Rahul Mamkootathil	58,389	44.27	▲6.21
BJP	C. Krishnakumar	39,549	28.63	▼6.71
LDF	P. Sarin	37,156	25.44	▼1.36
NOTA	None of the above	1,262	0.91	▲0.54
Margin of victory		18,840	13.64	▲10.93
Turnout		1,38,120	70.93	▼4.51
INC hold		Swing	▲6.21	

By local self-governed segment:

Status (Gram panchayat/municipality)	Votes		
Status (Gram panchayat/municipality)	UDF	NDA	LDF
Palakkad	31,787	27,197	16,719
Pirayiri	13,464	5,342	6,846
Mathur	6,529	3,089	6,926
Kannadi	6,272	3,618	6,665

=== 2021 ===
There were 1,88,789 eligible voters in Palakkad Assembly constituency for the 2021 Kerala Assembly election.

2021 Kerala Legislative Assembly election: Palakkad
Party	Candidate	Votes	%	±%
INC	Shafi Parambil	54,079	38.06	▼3.71
BJP	E. Sreedharan	50,220	35.34	▲6.26
CPI(M)	C. P. Pramod	36,433	25.64	▼2.43
NOTA	None of the above	528	0.37	▼0.15
Margin of victory		3,859	2.71	▼12
Turnout		1,42,104	75.44	▼1.81
INC hold		Swing	▼3.71	

By local self-governed segment:

Status (Gram panchayat/municipality)	Votes		
Status (Gram panchayat/municipality)	UDF	NDA	LDF
Palakkad	27,905	34,143	16,455
Pirayiri	12,815	6,355	6,614
Mathur	6,445	3,960	6,475
Kannadi	5,965	4,697	6,078

=== 2016 ===
There were 1,78,387 eligible voters in Palakkad Assembly constituency for the 2016 Kerala Assembly election.

2016 Kerala Legislative Assembly election: Palakkad
Party	Candidate	Votes	%	±%
INC	Shafi Parambil	57,559	41.77	▼0.64
BJP	Sobha Surendran	40,076	29.08	▲9.22
CPI(M)	N. N. Krishnadas	38,675	28.07	▼7.75
NOTA	None of the above	719	0.52	Steady
BSP	Hari Arumbil	411	0.30	▼0.14
Independent	Dr. M. N. Anwarudheen	364	0.26	Steady
Margin of victory		17,483	12.69	▲6.10
Turnout		1,37,804	77.25	▲4.47
INC hold		Swing	▼0.64	

=== 2011 ===
There were 1,54,374 eligible voters in Palakkad Assembly constituency for the 2011 Kerala Assembly election.

2011 Kerala Legislative Assembly election: Palakkad
Party	Candidate	Votes	%	±%
INC	Shafi Parambil	47,641	42.41	▲6.65
CPI(M)	K. K. Divakaran	40,238	35.82	▼1.15
BJP	C. Udaybhaskar	22,317	19.86	▼4.98
Independent	Shaji Abraham	637	0.57	Steady
BSP	Hari Arumbil	490	0.44	Steady
Independent	Muhammed Shafi	377	0.34	Steady
AIADMK	C. Sampath	337	0.30	Steady
Independent	Divakaran	310	0.28	Steady
Margin of victory		7,403	6.59	▲5.38
Turnout		1,12,347	72.78	▲1.2
INC gain from CPI(M)		Swing	▲6.65	

=== 2006 ===
There were 155,550 eligible voters in Palghat Assembly constituency for the 2006 Kerala Assembly election.

2006 Kerala Legislative Assembly election: Palghat
Party	Candidate	Votes	%	±%
CPI(M)	K. K. Divakaran	41,166	36.97	▼1.8
INC	A. V. Gopinathan	39,822	35.76	▼12.75
BJP	O. Rajagopal	27,667	24.84	▲13.88
Independent	Adv. Vijaya Sarathy	765	0.68	Steady
BSP	A. K. Saleem Aamayur	490	0.44	Steady
Independent	A. Gopinathan	442	0.39	Steady
Independent	Ravi Ezhavan	409	0.36	Steady
Independent	V. V. Gopinath	329	0.29	Steady
Independent	M. J. Joseph	256	0.22	Steady
Margin of victory		1,344	1.21	▼8.53
Turnout		111,346	71.58	▲3.53
CPI(M) gain from INC		Swing	▼1.8	

=== 2001 ===
There were 163,131 eligible voters in Palghat Assembly constituency for the 2001 Kerala Assembly election.

2001 Kerala Legislative Assembly election: Palghat
Party	Candidate	Votes	%	±%
INC	K. Sankara Narayanan	53,831	48.51	▲5.97
CPI(M)	T. K. Noushad	43,026	38.77	▼4.43
BJP	Adv. Rema Regunandan	12,159	10.96	▼1.65
Independent	G. Balu	847	0.76	Steady
Independent	K. Aruchamy	765	0.69	Steady
Independent	M. J. Joseph	336	0.30	Steady
Margin of victory		10,805	9.74	▲9.08
Turnout		110,964	68.05	▲6.57
INC gain from CPI(M)		Swing	▲5.97	

=== 1996 ===
There were 149,171 eligible voters in Palghat Assembly constituency for the 1996 Kerala Assembly election.

1996 Kerala Legislative Assembly election: Palghat
Party	Candidate	Votes	%	±%
CPI(M)	T. K. Noushad	39,198	43.20	▲1.93
INC	C. M. Sundaram	38,602	42.54	▼2.55
BJP	S. R. Balasubramanian	11,446	12.61	▲1.02
PDP	C. G. Mani	400	0.44	New
Independent	S. V. Iyer	414	0.45	Steady
JP	M. Sivanarayanan	296	0.33	▲0.03
Independent	P. P. Memon	229	0.25	▲0.8
Independent	G. P. Ganapathi Tharakan	157	0.17	Steady
Independent	P. V. Chidambareswaran	75	0.08	Steady
Margin of victory		596	0.66	▼3.16
Turnout		90,735	61.48	▼4.86
CPI(M) gain from INC		Swing	▲1.93	

=== 1991 ===
There were 140,683 eligible voters in Palghat Assembly constituency for the 1991 Kerala Assembly election.

1991 Kerala Legislative Assembly election: Palghat
Party	Candidate	Votes	%	±%
INC	C. M. Sundaram	41,432	45.09	▲0.74
CPI(M)	M. S. Gopalakrishnan	37,925	41.27	▲3.86
BJP	T. M. P. Iyer	10,648	11.59	▼2.69
Independent	A. K. Ponnan	846	0.92	Steady
Independent	S. V. Iyer	414	0.45	Steady
Independent	M. Sivanarayanan	278	0.30	Steady
Independent	K. Appukuttan	193	0.21	Steady
Independent	P. P. Memon	159	0.17	▲0.08
Margin of victory		3,507	3.82	▼3.12
Turnout		91,895	66.34	▼9.84
INC hold		Swing	▲0.74	

=== 1987 ===
There were 115,949 eligible voters in Palghat Assembly constituency for the 1987 Kerala Assembly election.

1987 Kerala Legislative Assembly election: Palghat
Party	Candidate	Votes	%	±%
Independent	C. M. Sundaram	38,774	44.35	▼0.11
CPI(M)	Girija Sundaram	32,709	37.41	Steady
BJP	V. S. Muthuswamy	12,489	14.28	▼0.36
Independent	V. Krishnadas	2,530	2.89	Steady
Independent	P. Ramakrishnan Nair	304	0.35	Steady
Independent	P. Velayudhan	233	0.27	Steady
Independent	P. K. T. Kuttan	171	0.20	Steady
Independent	P. P. Memon	76	0.09	▼0.10
Independent	S. Raveendran Pillai	71	0.08	Steady
Independent	K. Anpunathan	40	0.05	Steady
Independent	P. M. Abdul Rahiman	37	0.04	Steady
Margin of victory		6,065	6.94	▲2.08
Turnout		87,433	76.18	▲7.71
Independent hold		Swing	▼0.11	

=== 1982 ===
There were 96,367 eligible voters in Palghat Assembly constituency for the 1982 Kerala Assembly election.

1982 Kerala Legislative Assembly election: Palghat
Party	Candidate	Votes	%	±%
Independent	C. M. Sundaram	29,011	44.46	▼12.63
Independent	N. A. Kareem	25,841	39.61	Steady
BJP	O. Rajagopal	9,554	14.64	New
Independent	K. Narayanakutty	147	0.23	Steady
Independent	P. P. Menon	121	0.19	Steady
Independent	K. K. A. Razack	118	0.18	Steady
Independent	Mani	112	0.17	Steady
Independent	Sivanandan Panickar	100	0.15	Steady
Independent	A. T. Antony Thoma	97	0.15	Steady
Independent	Manikkath Krishna Menoon	75	0.11	Steady
Independent	P. Parvathy Subbaraman	70	0.11	Steady
Margin of victory		3,170	4.86	▼11.37
Turnout		65,246	68.47	▲7.9
Independent hold		Swing	▼12.63	

=== 1980 ===
There were 104,428 eligible voters in Palghat Assembly constituency for the 1980 Kerala Assembly election.

1980 Kerala Legislative Assembly election: Palghat
Party	Candidate	Votes	%	±%
Independent	C. M. Sundaram	35,902	57.09	▲7.09
INC(U)	K. A. Chandran	25,695	40.86	Steady
Independent	C. K. Chinnan Master	1,099	1.75	Steady
Independent	K. Appukuttan	118	0.30	Steady
Margin of victory		10,207	16.23	▲11.58
Turnout		62,884	60.57	▼15.13
Independent hold		Swing	▲7.09	

=== 1977 ===
There were 84,546 eligible voters in Palghat Assembly constituency for the 1977 Kerala Assembly election.

1977 Kerala Legislative Assembly election: Palghat
Party	Candidate	Votes	%	±%
Independent	C. M. Sundaram	30,160	50.00	Steady
CPI(M)	R. Krishnan	27,357	45.36	▲4.86
Independent	V. P. Purushothaman	1,121	1.86	Steady
Independent	Josepaul	739	1.23	Steady
Margin of victory		2,803	4.65	▼4.92
Turnout		60,315	75.70	▲5.78
Independent gain from CPI(M)		Swing		

=== 1970 ===
There were 83,098 eligible voters in Palghat Assembly constituency for the 1970 Kerala Assembly election.

1970 Kerala Legislative Assembly election: Palghat
Party	Candidate	Votes	%	±%
CPI(M)	R. Krishnan	22,113	40.50	▼13.63
Independent	A. Chandran Nair	17,653	30.93	Steady
ABJS	O. Rajagopal	15,646	27.42	▲17.2
Independent	M. P. Narayana Menon	656	1.15	Steady
Margin of victory		5,460	9.57	▼11.6
Turnout		57,068	69.92	▲1.17
CPI(M) hold		Swing	▼13.63	

=== 1967 ===
There were 69,273 eligible voters in Palghat Assembly constituency for the 1967 Kerala Assembly election.

1967 Kerala Legislative Assembly election: Palghat
Party	Candidate	Votes	%	±%
CPI(M)	R. Krishnan	24,627	54.13	▲12.67
INC	K. Sankaranarayanan	14,996	32.96	▲1.98
ABJS	O. Rajagopalan	4,649	10.22	▲3.49
SWA	A. R. Rajagopalan	1,222	2.69	Steady
Margin of victory		9,631	21.17	▲10.69
Turnout		45,494	68.75	▲2.52
CPI(M) hold		Swing	▲12.67	

=== 1965 ===
There were 65,960 eligible voters in Palghat Assembly constituency for the 1965 Kerala Assembly election.

1965 Kerala Legislative Assembly election: Palghat
Party	Candidate	Votes	%	±%
CPI(M)	M. V. Vasu	17,747	41.46	New
INC	K. Pyarijan Sunna Sahib	13,260	30.98	▼20.73
Independent	P. K. Krishnaswamy	5,279	12.33	Steady
Independent	O. Rajagopalan	2,879	6.73	Steady
CPI	C. K. Gopalanunni	2,251	5.26	▼43.03
Independent	R. G. Narayana Iyer	1,388	3.24	Steady
Margin of victory		4,487	10.48	▲7.06
Turnout		42,804	66.23	▼14.41
CPI(M) gain from INC		Swing	Steady	

=== 1960 ===
There were 64,542 eligible voters in Palghat Assembly constituency for the 1960 Kerala Assembly election.

1960 Kerala Legislative Assembly election: Palghat
Party	Candidate	Votes	%	±%
INC	R. Raghava Menon	26,546	51.71	▲9.43
CPI	C. K. Gopalanunni	24,788	48.29	▼7.79
Margin of victory		1,758	3.42	▲1.64
Turnout		51,334	80.64	▲21.33
INC hold		Swing	+9.43	

=== 1957 ===
There were 59,314 eligible voters in Palghat Assembly constituency for the 1957 Kerala Assembly election.

1957 Kerala Legislative Assembly election: Palghat
Party	Candidate	Votes	%	±%
INC	R. Raghava Menon	14,873	42.28	▲10.8
CPI	M. P Kunhiraman	14,248	40.50	New
Independent	C. K Moosath	6,058	17.22	New
Margin of victory		625	1.78	▼24.84
Turnout		35,179	59.31	▲0.02
INC gain from Independent		Swing	▲10.8	

=== 1952 ===
There were 76,828 eligible voters in Palghat Assembly constituency for the 1952 Madras Legislative Assembly election.

1952 Madras Legislative Assembly election: Palghat
Party	Candidate	Votes	%	±%
Independent	K. Ramakrishnan	26,469	58.10	New
INC	P. Vasu Menon	14,342	31.48	New
Independent	M. Echara Menon	2,484	5.45	New
Independent	R. V. Sarma	2,260	4.96	New
Margin of victory		12,127	26.62	Steady
Turnout		45,555	59.29	
Independent win (new seat)				

== See also ==
- Palakkad
- Palakkad district
- List of constituencies of the Kerala Legislative Assembly
- 2016 Kerala Legislative Assembly election
