= C. M. Sundaram =

Indian politician

C. M. Sundaram (1919–2008) was minister for local administration in the Congress-led United Democratic Front (UDF) government in Kerala from 1982 to 1987.

== Career ==
Sundaram began his political career by organising hutment-dwellers of Bombay in the 1950s and by launching the Greater Bombay Tenants Union. He later joined the socialist movement and worked with socialist leaders like Jayaprakash Narayan, Ashok Mehta and Madhu Dandavate. When the huts in the city were burnt down as part of a "Clean Bombay" operation when Morarji Desai was Chief Minister, Sundaram organised the hutment-dwellers and forcefully occupied the Bombay municipal office. The government was forced to provide alternative land and houses to them near to Chembur.

In 1955 he returned to his ancestral Kalpathy Agraharam and started organising tribal people and hutment-dwellers there. He fought against the eviction of tribals from Malampuzha when a dam was to be constructed. The government had to resettle them.

He first entered the Legislative Assembly of Kerala in 1977 representing the Praja Socialist Party from Palakkad constituency. In total, he was elected from Palakkad to the Assembly on five occasions. He joined the Indian National Congress party in 1990.
