= Athanasios Geevarghese =

Indian Syriac Orthodox bishop

His Grace Mor Athanasios Geevarghese Abbot of Mor Ignatius Dayro Manjinikkara & Metropolitan of Simhasana Churches of South Kerala
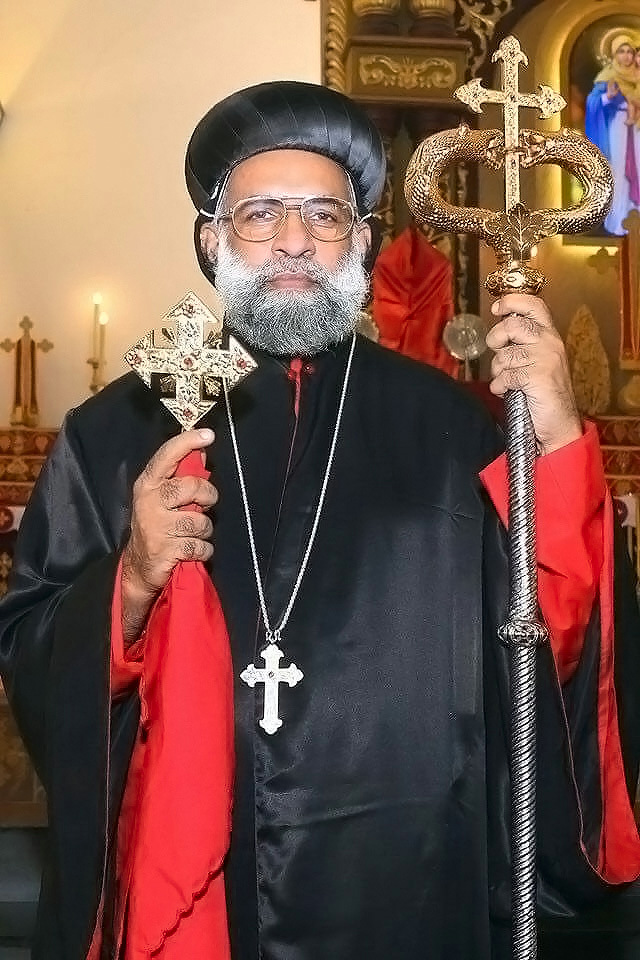
- Church: Syrian Orthodox Church
- Diocese: Simhasana Churches of South Kerala
- See: Holy Apostolic See of Antioch & All East

Orders
- Ordination: 09 January 1993 (Kassisso) by Osthatheos Thomas
- Consecration: 8 December 2002 by Patriarch Ignatius Zakka I
- Rank: Metropolitan

Personal details
- Born: October 12, 1957 Ernakulam
- Parents: Late Mr. G. Korah & Susan Korah
- Education: Chartered Accountant, B.Sc. Physics

Mor Athanasios Geevarghese (born 12 October 1957) is a Syriac Orthodox bishop, currently the Abbot of Mor Ignatius Dayro Manjinikkara & Metropolitan of Simhasana Churches of South Kerala.

== Early life ==
Mor Athanasius Geevarghese was born in the Eralil family of Ayyampilly on 12 October 1957 to Late Mr. G. Korah and Susan Korah.

== Education ==
He has a B.Sc. Physics Degree at St. Alberts College, Kochi and has completed education as a Chartered Accountant from A.A Menon & Associates at Ernakulam.
