= Niranam Diocese of Jacobite Syrian Christian Church =

Malankara Syriac Orthodox Church Diocese of Niranam

Location
- Country: India
- Jurisdiction: Niranam and others

Leadership
- Patriarch: Ignatius Aphrem II
- Catholicos: Baselios Joseph
- Bishop: Coorilose Geevarghese
- Auxiliary Bishop: Barnabas Geevarghese

History
- Established: 1856
- First Hierarch: Gregorios of Parumala

Information
- Denomination: Oriental Orthodox
- Church: Syriac Orthodox Church
- Maphrianate: Jacobite Syrian Christian Church
- Calendar: Gregorian Calendar
- Languages: Classical Syriac, and Malayalam
- Cathedral: St. Gregorios Patriarchal Centre Niranam

The Niranam Diocese, the smallest and one of the oldest dioceses of the Jacobite Syrian Christian Church, is located in Niranam, India. Niranam is one of the places where St. Thomas the Apostle preached in the 1st century.

== History ==
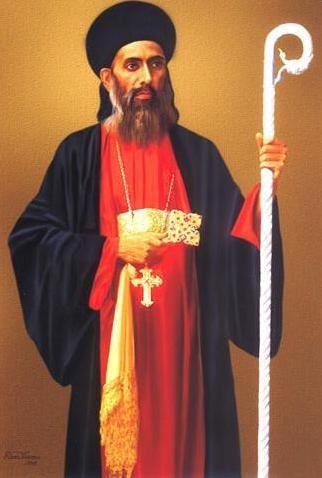
The Portrait of Geevarghese Mar Gregorios of Parumala by Raja Ravi Varma Kept inside the St. John's Jacobite Syrian church Kumarakom.

Niranam diocese was established by Patriarch Ignatius Peter IV, the Patriarch of Antioch during his apostolic visit to India in 1876 at the historic Mulanthuruthy Synod. Geevarghese Gregorios of Parumala was ordained as its first metropolitan. Later in 1987, Mor Gregorios declared a saint by Ignatius Zakka I Patriarch of Antioch for Syriac Orthodox Church of India.

The Diocese of Niranam has now been made an independent diocese headquarter at St. Gregorios Church and the Patriarchal Center of Parumala. The present Niranam Diocese metropolitan is Geevarghese Mor Coorilose, who was consecrated as bishop on 3 July 2006 at St. Thomas Church of Paravur. The present auxiliary metropolitan is Geevarghese Mor Barnabas of the Niranam Diocese.

== Diocesan metropolitans ==
List of Diocesan metropolitans
| From | Until | Metropolitan | Notes |
|---|---|---|---|
| 1973 | 1995 | Kuriakose Mor Koorilos | Metropolitan of Niranam, Quilon and Thumpamon, entombed at Mor Ignatius Dayara, Adoor |
| 1995 | 1999 | Geevarghese Mor Gregorios | Former Metropolitan of Niranam Diocese, Entombed at Perumpally Simhasana Church, Ernakulam |
| 1999 | 2000 | Thomas Mor Divanasios | Catholicos of India and former Metropolitan Trustee |
| 2000 | 2005 | Thomas Mor Timotheos | Former Metropolitan of Niranam Diocese |
| 2005 | 2005 | Markose Mor Koorilos | Metropolitan of Niranam and Kandanad Diocese, Entombed at St. Mary's Church Pangada, Kottayam |
| 2005 | 2007 | Joseph Mor Gregorios | former Metropolitan of Niranam Diocese |
| 2007 | Present | Geevarghese Mor Coorilos | Present Metropolitan of Niranam Diocese |
