= Coorilose Geevarghese =

His Grace Mor Dr. Coorilose Geevarghese
- Metropolitan of Niranam Diocese of Malankara Jacobite Syriac Orthodox Church
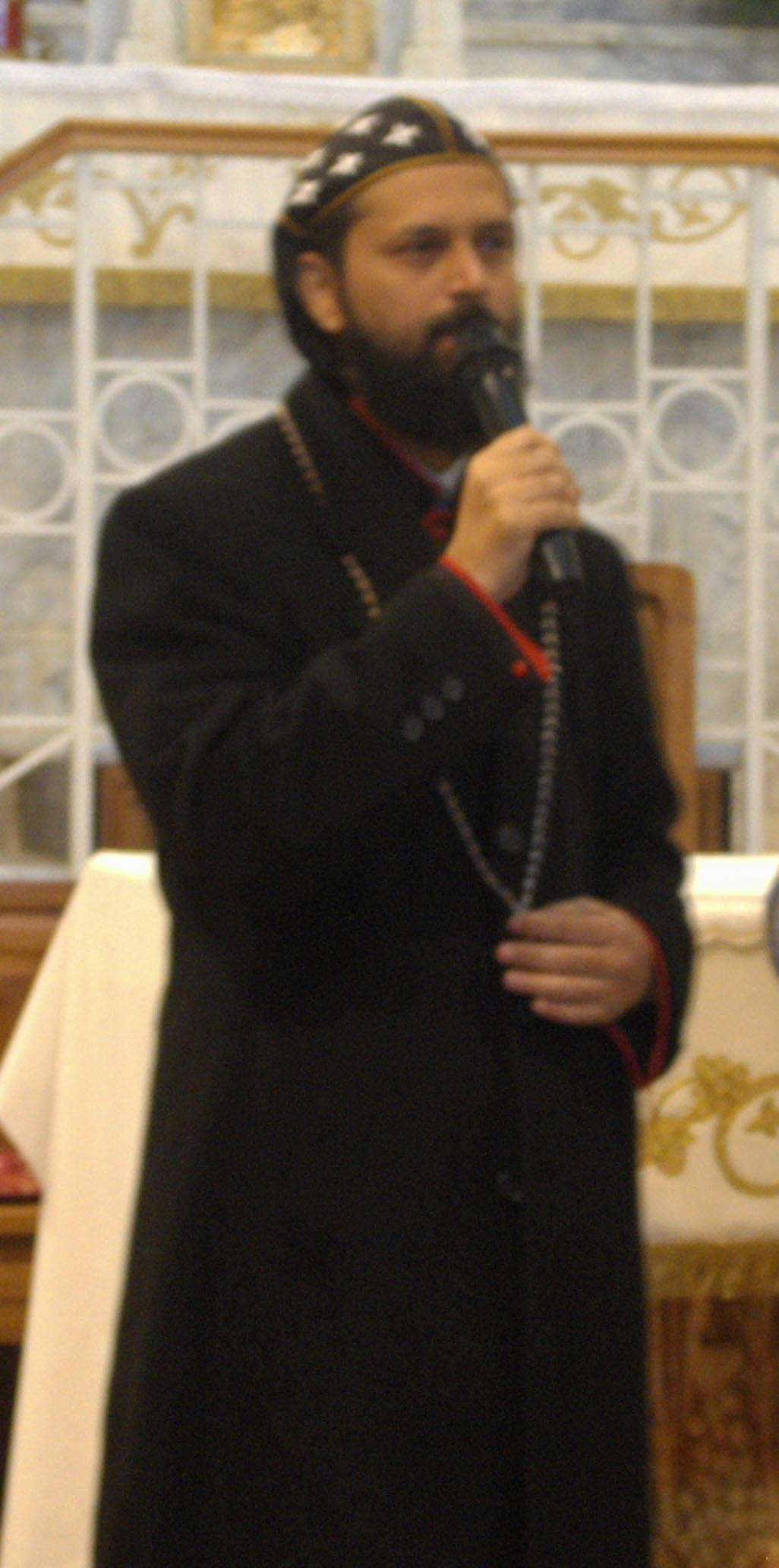
- Geevarghese Mor Coorilos
- Church: Malankara Jacobite Syriac Orthodox Church
- Diocese: Niranam
- See: Syriac Orthodox Patriarchate of Antioch and All the East
- In office: 2006–present
- Predecessor: Kuriakose Mor Kurilose; Mor Markose Coorilos
- Successor: incumbent
- Previous post: None

Orders
- Ordination: 3 July 2006

Personal details
- Born: 1965 (age 60–61) Nalunnakkal, Kerala

Mor Coorilos Geevarghese, formerly George Mathew Nalunnakkal, is the Metropolitan of Niranam Diocese of Malankara Jacobite Syriac Orthodox Church.

== Life and pastoral career ==
George Mathew Nalunnakkal was born in Nalunnakkal, Kottayam, Kerala in 1965 as son of P.C. Mathew (Principal Sub Registrar) and Marykutty. He has two brothers and four sisters. He was baptized at St. Adai's Jacobite Syriac Orthodox Church, Nalunnakkal, his home parish. His early schooling was done at St. Adai's Primary School, St. Elias Upper Primary School, Nalunnakkal and Jerusalem Mount High School, Vakathanam. After his schooling he joined St. Berchmans' College, Changanacherry where he did his Pre-Degree and Graduation in English literature.

=== Theological studies ===
After his graduation, he joined the United Theological College, Bangalore for his theological studies. He completed his B.D in 1990 in first class and was appointed as research assistant in the department of Church and Society. In 1991, he joined the faculty of the M.S.O.T. Seminary in Mulanthuruthy, Kerala. In 1992 he was offered a scholarship to do his doctoral studies in England and he joined the University of Kent at Canterbury, England to do his Ph.D. in Ecotheology under Anglican Professor Robin Gill. On completing his Ph.D., he rejoined M.S.O.T. Seminary and resumed teaching. In 2001 Mor Coorilos joined the teaching faculty of the United Theological College, Bangalore.

=== Ordination ===
Mor Coorilos was ordained a deacon in 2001 and a priest in 2002 by Thomas Mor Themotheose Metropolitan. After his ordination, he served as vicar in different parishes in Kerala and assistant vicar in one of the Bangalore parishes. In 2006, he was elevated to the position of Bishop

=== Other positions ===
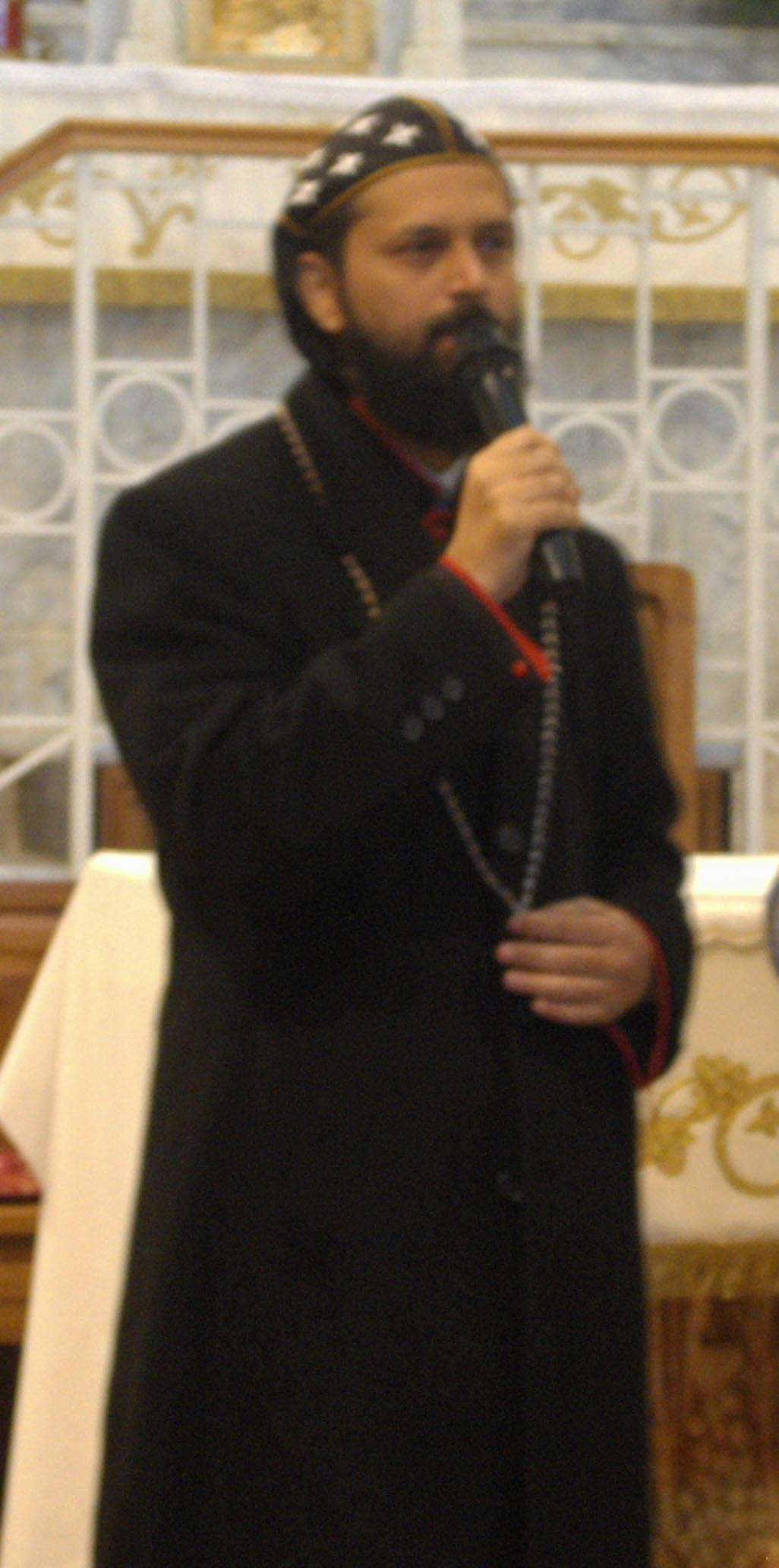
Geevarghese Mor Coorilose

He presently serves as the president of KCC (Kerala Council of Churches). He served the Kerala Council of Churches as its senior faculty member (1997–1998), the National Council of Churches in India as its executive secretary for Mission and Evangelism (1998–2001). He now serves the World Council of Churches as moderator of its Commission on World Mission and Evangelism (CWME). He was also a full member of the WCC's reference group on Human Sexuality. Mor Coorilos also serves as a member of the Working Group of Global Christian Forum (GCF) that looks at the issue of proselytism and mission and also as the chairperson of the Student Christian Movement of India (SCMI). He is also a member of the advisory group of Korean Institute of Future Ecumenism (KIFE). He also serves as a member of the Theological Commission of the Malankara Jacobite Syriac Orthodox Church that is engaged in bilateral dialogue with the Mar Thoma Syrian Church. Mor Coorilos was an active prohibitionist during the time period of Kerala's Liquor Bar issue of Second Oommen Chandy Ministry.

==== India Center for Social Change ====
As of 2014 Mor Coorilos was the chairman of Theeram, India Center for Social Change, a charitable trust that Mor Coorilos founded in 2002 which has been working for the welfare of mentally challenged children in Kerala. Under his leadership this institution has established thirteen vocational training and day care centers in various parts of Kerala and a full-fledged residential centre in Puthuppally, Kottayam under the name Theeram, where about 225 mentally disabled children are being trained. Theeram has also started an old age home in the tsunami-hit area of Alappadu in Karunagappally, Kerala.

==== Mor Adai Study Center ====
As of 2014, Metropolitan Coorilos was serving Mor Adai Study Center as its working president. He was the co-founder and the executive director since 2003, and when he was elevated to the position of metropolitan, he became the working president.

== Published works ==
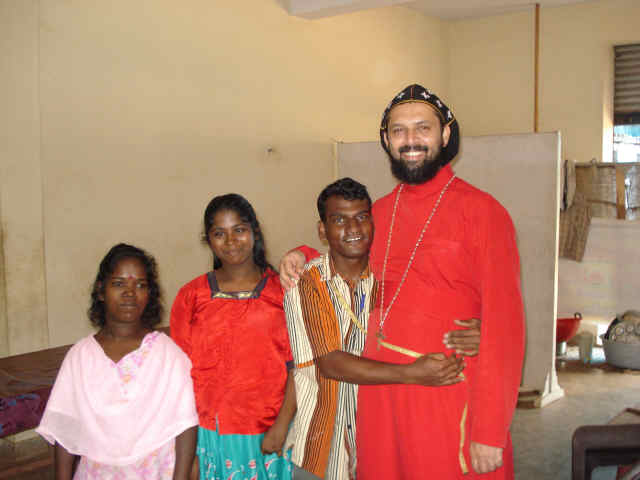
Geevarghese Mor Coorilose

Coorilos's published works include:

- Jeevante Akhosham, Bible Studies in Malayalam, KCC/EDTP, Tiruvalla, 1998
- New Beings and New Communities: Theological Reflections in a Postmodern Context, KCC/EDTP, Tiruvalla, 1998
- Green Liberation: Towards an Integral Ecotheology, NCCI/ISPCK, Delhi, 1999
- Quest for Justice: Perspectives on Mission and Unity (co-edited), NCCI/GURUKUL/ISPCK, Delhi, 2000
- Re-routing Mission: Towards a People's Concept of Mission, CCA/CSS, Tiruvalla, 2004
- HIV/AIDS: A Challenge to Theological Education, (co-edited), BTESSC/Sathri, Bangalore, 2004
- Sathya Vishwasa Padanangal (co-authored), Essays in Malayalam on Oriental Orthodox faith, Mor Adai Study Center, Cheeranchira, 2003
- Kazhchapadukal, Essays in Malayalam, Mor Adai Study Center, Cheeranchira, 2002
- Ethical Issues: Subaltern Perspectives, CSS, Tiruvalla, 2008
- Samantharalokangal, Essays in Malayalam on Contemporary Socio-Political Issues, CSS, Tiruvalla, 2012
