= Palakkad Lok Sabha constituency =

Lok Sabha Constituency in Kerala, India

Coordinates: 10.8°N 76.7°E

Palakkad KL-9
- Lok Sabha constituency
- Palakkad Lok Sabha constituency

Constituency details
- Country: India
- Region: South India
- State: Kerala
- Assembly constituencies: Pattambi; Shornur; Ottapalam; Kongad; Mannarkkad; Malampuzha; Palakkad
- Established: 1957
- Total electors: 13,20,680 (2019)
- Reservation: None

Member of Parliament
- 18th Lok Sabha
- Incumbent V. K. Sreekandan
- Party: INC
- Alliance: UDF
- Elected year: 2024

Palakkad Lok Sabha constituency is one of the 20 Lok Sabha (parliamentary) constituencies in Kerala state in southern India.

== Assembly segments ==
Palakkad Lok Sabha constituency is composed of the following assembly segments:

No	Name	District	Member	Party	2024 Lead
50	Pattambi	Palakkad	Muhammed Muhsin	CPI	INC
51	Shornur	Palakkad	P. Mammikutty	CPI(M)	CPI(M)
52	Ottapalam	Palakkad	K. Premkumar	CPI(M)	INC
53	Kongad (SC)	Palakkad	K. A. Thulasi	INC	INC
54	Mannarkkad	Palakkad	N. Shamsudheen	IUML	INC
55	Malampuzha	Palakkad	A. Prabhakaran	CPI(M)	CPI(M)
56	Palakkad	Palakkad	Ramesh Pisharody	INC	INC

== Members of Parliament ==
Year	Member	Party
1957	Vella Eacharan	Indian National Congress
1957	P. Kunhan	Communist Party of India
1962	P. Kunhan	Communist Party of India
1967	E. K. Nayanar	Communist Party of India (Marxist)
1971	A. K. Gopalan	Communist Party of India (Marxist)
1977	A. Sunnasahib	Indian National Congress
1980	V. S. Vijayaraghavan	Indian National Congress (I)
1984	V. S. Vijayaraghavan	Indian National Congress
1989	Vijayaraghavan Alampadan	Communist Party of India (Marxist)
1991	V. S. Vijayaraghavan	Indian National Congress
1996	N. N. Krishnadas	Communist Party of India (Marxist)
1998	N. N. Krishnadas	Communist Party of India (Marxist)
1999	N. N. Krishnadas	Communist Party of India (Marxist)
2004	N. N. Krishnadas	Communist Party of India (Marxist)
2009	M. B. Rajesh	Communist Party of India (Marxist)
2014	M. B. Rajesh	Communist Party of India (Marxist)
2019	V. K. Sreekandan	Indian National Congress
2024	V. K. Sreekandan	Indian National Congress

== Election results ==
Vote share of Winning candidates
2024	40.66%
2019	39.17%
2014	45.36%
2009	42.81%
2004	45.70%
1999	46.19%
1998	46.99%
1996	47.77%
1991	48.38%
1989	47.42%
1984	51.62%
1980	49.86%
1977	49.70%
1971	57.12%
1967	59.14%
1962	65.62%
1957	25.67%

=== General Elections 2029 ===
2029 Indian general election: Palakkad
Party	Candidate	Votes	%	±%
UDF				
LDF				
NDA				
NOTA	None of the above			
Margin of victory				
Turnout				
		Swing		

=== General Election 2024 ===
2024 Indian general election: Palakkad
Party	Candidate	Votes	%	±%
INC	V. K. Sreekandan	421,169	40.66	▲1.49
CPI(M)	A. Vijayaraghavan	3,45,886	33.39	▼4.64
BJP	C. Krishnakumar	2,51,778	24.31	▲2.87
NOTA	None of the above	8,793	0.85	▲0.20
Majority		75,283	7.26	▲6.12
Turnout		10,38,946	74.16	
Registered electors				
INC hold		Swing	▲1.49	

By Assembly Segments
No.	Status (Assembly Constituency)	Votes			Lead
No.	Status (Assembly Constituency)	V. K. Sreekandan	A. Vijayaraghavan	C. Krishnakumar	Lead
50	Pattambi	75,240	48,104	22,208	27,136
51	Shornur	52,366	56,117	36,409	3,781
52	Ottapalam	57,063	54,855	42,091	2,208
53	Kongad (SC)	52,851	46,193	34,606	6,658
54	Mannarkkad	78,478	46,374	22,715	32,104
55	Malampuzha	49,295	55,815	48,467	6,520
56	Palakkad	52,779	34,640	43,072	9,707

=== General Elections 2019 ===
2019 Indian general election: Palakkad
Party	Candidate	Votes	%	±%
INC	V. K. Sreekandan	399,274	39.17	
CPI(M)	M. B. Rajesh	3,87,637	38.03	−7.33
BJP	C. Krishnakumar	2,18,556	21.44	6.44
NOTA	None of the Above	6,665	0.65	−0.59
SDPI	Thulaseedharan Pallickal	5,749	0.56	−0.81
Margin of victory		11,637	1.14	−10.43
Turnout		10,19,337	77.77	1.73
Registered electors		13,23,010		9.45
INC gain from CPI(M)		Swing	-6.19	

By Assembly Segments
No.	Status (Assembly Constituency)	Votes			Lead
No.	Status (Assembly Constituency)	V. K. Sreekandan	M. B. Rajesh	C. Krishnakumar	Lead
50	Pattambi	67,644	50,465	20,716	17,179
51	Shornur	49,810	60,902	32,308	11,092
52	Ottapalam	54,386	60,846	35,683	6,460
53	Kongad (SC)	52,456	52,812	29,104	356
54	Mannarkkad	78,250	48,625	18,560	29,625
55	Malampuzha	47,743	69,037	41,413	21,294
56	Palakkad	48,425	44,086	39,963	4,339

=== General Elections 2014 ===
2014 Indian general election: Palakkad
Party	Candidate	Votes	%	±%
CPI(M)	M. B. Rajesh	412,897	45.36	+2.54
SJ(D)	M. P. Veerendra Kumar	3,07,597	33.79	
BJP	Sobha Surendran	1,36,587	15.00	+6.29
SDPI	E. S. Khaja Hussain	12,504	1.37	
NOTA	None of the Above	11,291	1.24	
WPOI	Thennilapuram Radhakrishnan	8,667	0.95	
AAP	B. Padmanabhan	4,933	0.54	
Margin of victory		1,05,300	11.57	+11.34
Turnout		9,10,322	75.33	+1.84
Registered electors		12,08,726		+12.46
CPI(M) hold		Swing	2.54	

By Assembly Segments
No.	Status (Assembly Constituency)	Votes			Lead
No.	Status (Assembly Constituency)	M. B. Rajesh	M. P. Veerendra Kumar	Sobha Surendran	Lead
50	Pattambi	53,821	47,231	15,102	6,590
51	Shornur	64,559	39,180	19,586	25,379
52	Ottapalam	65,945	46,366	20,564	19,579
53	Kongad (SC)	56,160	41,799	17,598	14,361
54	Mannarkkad	54,265	54,553	14,271	288
55	Malampuzha	71,816	40,466	23,433	31,350
56	Palakkad	45,861	37,692	25,892	8,169

=== General Elections 2009 ===
2009 Indian general election: Palakkad
Party	Candidate	Votes	%	±%
CPI(M)	M. B. Rajesh	338,070	42.81	−2.89
INC	Satheeshan Pacheni	3,36,250	42.58	8.84
BJP	C. K. Padmanabhan	68,804	8.71	−9.29
Independent	M. R. Murali	20,896	2.65	
NCP	Abdul Razak Moulavi	8,111	1.03	
Independent	Satheesan. E.V	5,478	0.69	
Independent	A. Arokiasamy	3,776	0.48	
Margin of victory		1,820	0.23	−11.73
Turnout		7,89,648	73.48	−0.27
Registered electors		10,74,818		−3.44
CPI(M) hold		Swing	-2.89	

=== General Elections 2004 ===
2004 Indian general election: Palakkad
Party	Candidate	Votes	%	±%
CPI(M)	N. N. Krishnadas	375,144	45.70	−0.49
INC	V. S. Vijayaraghavan	2,76,986	33.74	−8.63
BJP	C. Udai Bhasker	1,47,792	18.00	7.10
Independent	Krishnadas	7,637	0.93	
BSP	M. Subramanian	5,021	0.61	
Independent	K. Kuttikrishnan	5,006	0.61	
Margin of victory		98,158	11.96	8.14
Turnout		8,20,856	73.78	1.69
Registered electors		11,13,144		−1.70
CPI(M) hold		Swing	-0.49	

=== General Elections 1999 ===
1999 Indian general election: Palakkad
Party	Candidate	Votes	%	±%
CPI(M)	N. N. Krishnadas	372,536	46.19	−0.80
INC	M. T. Padma	3,41,769	42.37	−1.21
BJP	C. Uday Bhaskar	87,948	10.90	2.56
Margin of victory		30,767	3.81	0.42
Turnout		8,06,543	72.05	2.58
Registered electors		11,32,416		5.20
CPI(M) hold		Swing	-1.58	

=== General Elections 1998 ===
1998 Indian general election: Palakkad
Party	Candidate	Votes	%	±%
CPI(M)	N. N. Krishnadas	345,963	46.99	−0.78
INC	V. S. Vijayaraghavan	3,20,941	43.59	−0.92
BJP	Prof. T. C. Govindan	61,419	8.34	3.16
Independent	U. C. Kunjan	3,916	0.53	
Margin of victory		25,022	3.40	0.14
Turnout		7,36,292	69.19	−0.28
Registered electors		10,76,444		1.35
CPI(M) hold		Swing	-0.78	

=== General Elections 1996 ===
1996 Indian general election: Palakkad
Party	Candidate	Votes	%	±%
CPI(M)	N. N. Krishnadas	343,264	47.77	1.67
INC	V. S. Vijayaraghavan	3,19,841	44.51	−3.87
BJP	M. V. Sukumaran	37,221	5.18	0.66
JP	P. Sethumadhavan	3,289	0.46	
Independent	N. Krishna Kumar	3,274	0.46	
Margin of victory		23,423	3.26	0.98
Turnout		7,18,544	69.47	−2.09
Registered electors		10,62,083		8.13
CPI(M) gain from INC		Swing	-0.61	

=== General Elections 1991 ===
1991 Indian general election: Palakkad
Party	Candidate	Votes	%	±%
INC	V. S. Vijayaraghavan	334,913	48.38	1.14
CPI(M)	A. Vijayaraghavan	3,19,145	46.10	−1.32
BJP	Rema S. Menon	31,323	4.52	0.82
JP	Sivanarayanan	4,146	0.60	
Margin of victory		15,768	2.28	2.10
Turnout		6,92,292	71.56	−5.89
Registered electors		9,82,228		2.55
INC gain from CPI(M)		Swing	0.96	

=== General Elections 1989 ===
1989 Indian general election: Palakkad
Party	Candidate	Votes	%	±%
CPI(M)	A. Vijayaraghavan	348,401	47.42	2.65
INC	V. S. Vijayaraghavan	3,47,115	47.24	−4.38
BJP	T. Chandrasekharan	27,220	3.70	
Margin of victory		1,286	0.18	−6.68
Turnout		7,34,778	77.45	0.36
Registered electors		9,57,847		30.93
CPI(M) gain from INC		Swing	-4.21	

=== General Elections 1984 ===
1984 Indian general election: Palakkad
Party	Candidate	Votes	%	±%
INC	V. S. Vijayaraghavan	287,170	51.62	
CPI(M)	T. Sivadasa Menon	2,49,017	44.76	−2.15
Independent	Rohana Jayaram	11,092	1.99	
Margin of victory		38,153	6.86	3.91
Turnout		5,56,296	77.09	18.13
Registered electors		7,31,568		3.74
INC gain from INC(I)		Swing	1.76	

=== General Elections 1980 ===
1980 Indian general election: Palakkad
Party	Candidate	Votes	%	±%
INC(I)	V. S. Vijayaraghavan	204,355	49.86	
CPI(M)	T. Sivadasa Menon	1,92,267	46.91	0.77
Independent	K. P. R. Gopalan	6,818	1.66	
Independent	K. Veluthira	3,328	0.81	
Independent	R. Aravindakhshan	3,096	0.76	
Margin of victory		12,088	2.95	−0.61
Turnout		4,09,864	58.95	−15.68
Registered electors		7,05,179		19.67
INC(I) gain from INC		Swing	0.15	

=== General Elections 1977 ===
1977 Indian general election: Palakkad
Party	Candidate	Votes	%	±%
INC	A. Sunnasahib	207,604	49.70	
CPI(M)	T. Sivadasa Menon	1,92,733	46.14	−10.98
Independent	Cherapadam Sivarama Krishna Iyer	17,341	4.15	
Margin of victory		14,871	3.56	−12.06
Turnout		4,17,678	74.63	14.18
Registered electors		5,89,253		4.31
INC gain from CPI(M)		Swing	-7.42	

=== General Elections 1971 ===
1971 Indian general election: Palakkad
Party	Candidate	Votes	%	±%
CPI(M)	A. K. Gopalan	191,089	57.12	−2.02
Independent	T. C. Govindan	1,38,823	41.50	
Independent	V. P. Purshothaman	4,601	1.38	
Margin of victory		52,266	15.62	−9.55
Turnout		3,34,513	60.45	−0.83
Registered electors		5,64,890		21.27
CPI(M) hold		Swing	-2.02	

=== General Elections 1967 ===
1967 Indian general election: Palakkad
Party	Candidate	Votes	%	±%
CPI(M)	E. K. Nayanar	158,230	59.14	
INC	C. S. Devan	90,872	33.97	4.39
Independent	P. T. Kochuvarkey	18,436	6.89	
Margin of victory		67,358	25.18	−10.87
Turnout		2,67,538	61.28	10.73
Registered electors		4,65,825		11.54
CPI(M) gain from CPI		Swing	-6.47	

=== General Elections 1962 ===
1962 Indian general election: Palakkad
Party	Candidate	Votes	%	±%
CPI	Kunhan Patinjara Veetilpadi	131,688	65.62	39.94
INC	V. Eacharan	59,353	29.57	9.09
ABJS	K. Krishnankutty	9,650	4.81	
Margin of victory		72,335	36.04	30.86
Turnout		2,00,691	50.55	−57.31
Registered electors		4,17,640		−50.54
CPI hold		Swing	39.94	

=== General Elections 1957 ===
1957 Indian general election: Palakkad
Party	Candidate	Votes	%	±%
CPI	Kunhan Patinjara Veetilpadi	233,807	25.67	
INC	Eacharan V. Iyyani	1,86,594	20.49	
CPI	K. Damodaran	1,85,662	20.39	
INC	P. Vasu Menon	1,42,053	15.60	
Independent	Chadayan Muniyadan	91,922	10.09	
Independent	T. Muhamad Ismail	70,691	7.76	
Margin of victory		47,213	5.18	
Turnout		9,10,729	107.86	
Registered electors		8,44,346		
CPI win (new seat)				

== See also ==
- Palghat
- Malappuram district
- List of constituencies of the Lok Sabha
- Indian general election, 2014 (Kerala)
