= Athicode =

- village
- Location in Kerala, India Athicode (India)
- Coordinates: 10°44′0″N 76°51′0″E
- Country: India
- State: Kerala
- District: Palakkad

Languages
  - Official: Malayalam, English
- Time zone: UTC+5:30 (IST)
- PIN: 678554
- Vehicle registration: KL-9
- Lok Sabha constituency: Palakkad
- Vidhan Sabha constituency: Chittur

Athicode is an old junction village in Palakkad district of Kerala state, India. It is the main junction to the towns of Palakkad (20 km), Pollachi (25 km), Coimbatore (35 km) and Chittur (16 km). Half of the village is in Kozhinjampara panchayat and other half in Nallepilly panchayat.
