= Rahul Mamkootathil =

Indian politician

- രാഹുൽ മാങ്കൂട്ടത്തിൽ
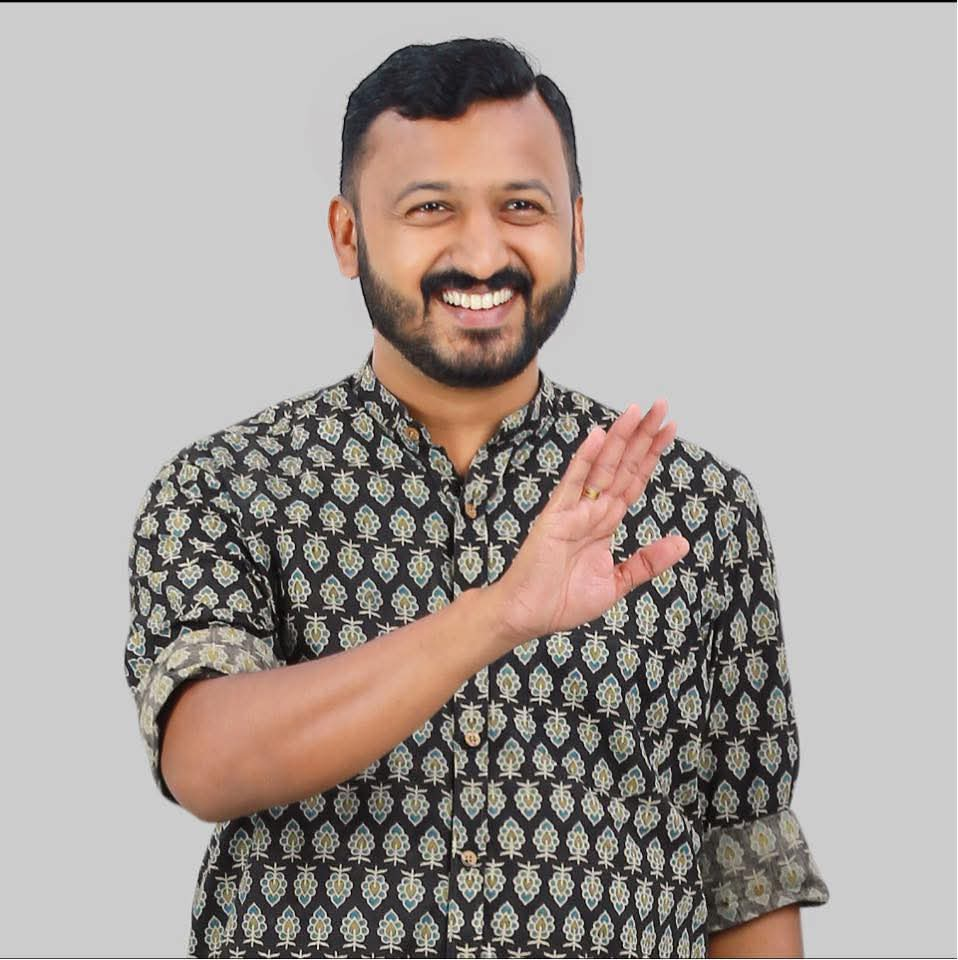
- Mamkootathil in 2023

Member of the Kerala Legislative Assembly
- In office 4 December 2024 – 23 May 2026
- Preceded by: Shafi Parambil
- Succeeded by: Ramesh Pisharody
- Constituency: Palakkad

Personal details
- Born: Rahul B. R.
- Party: Indian National Congress (2007 - 2025)
- Education: St. Stephen's College, Delhi, Catholicate College, Pathanamthitta
- Occupation: Politician; businessman; entrepreneur

Rahul B. R., better known as Rahul Mamkootathil, is an Indian politician from Kerala who served as a member in the 15th Kerala Assembly from Palakkad from 2024 to 2026. He was a member of the Indian National Congress.

== Early life and education ==
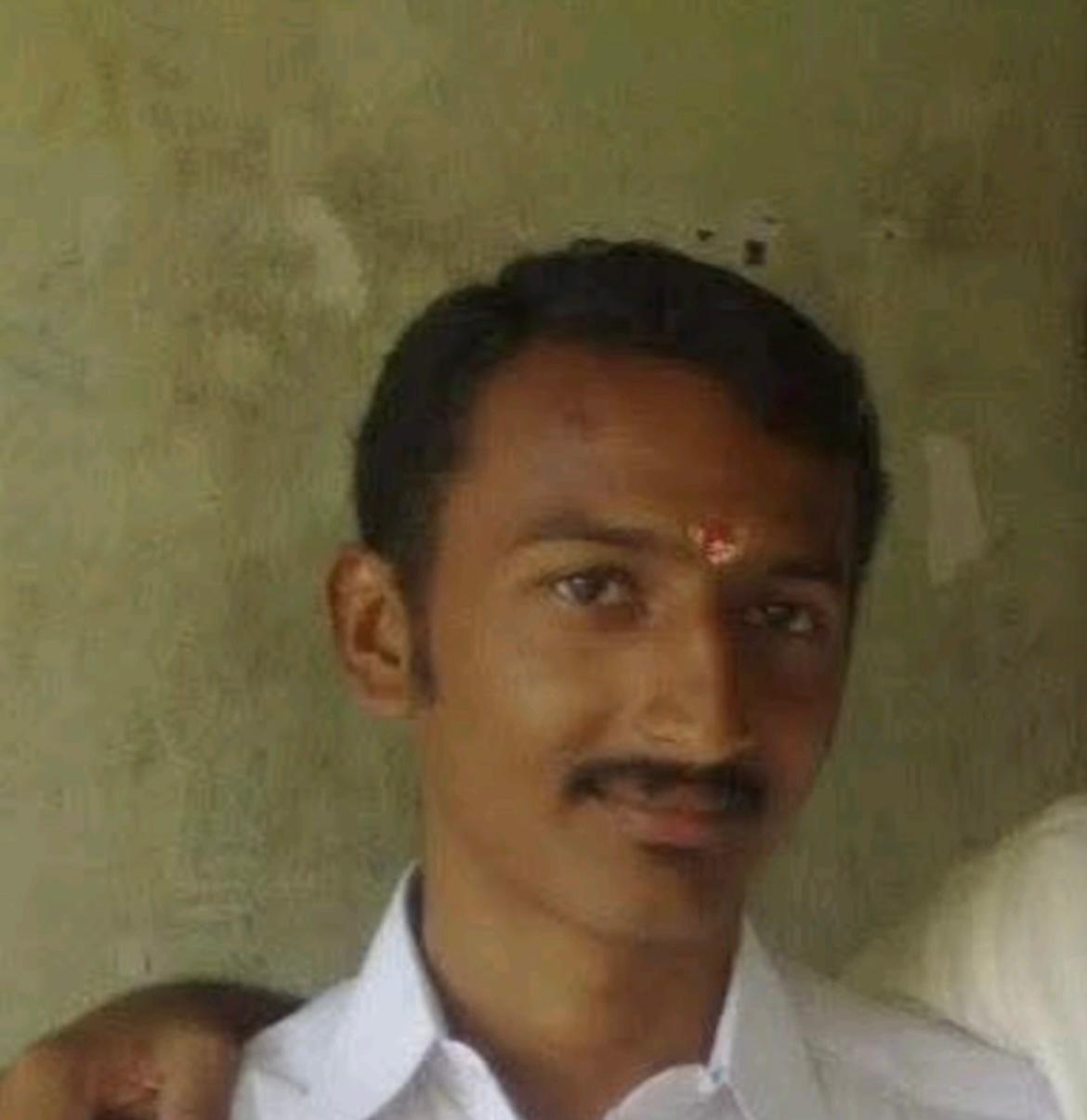
Mamkootathil during his college days

Mamkootathil studied at Thapovan Public School in Adoor and at St. John's School in Pandalam. He did his B.A. degree in History from Catholicate College, Pathanamthitta. He then completed postgraduate degrees in English from IGNOU and in History from St. Stephen's College, Delhi. He is pursuing a Ph.D. at the Mahatma Gandhi University, Kottayam.

== Sexual abuse allegations ==
On 21 August 2025, Mamkootathil resigned as president of the Kerala Youth Congress following allegations by Malayalam actor Rini Ann George, who claimed that a "young politician" had sent her obscene messages and invited her to a hotel. Although she did not name the individual, media reports linked the allegation to Mamkootathil. He denied any wrongdoing and continued to serve as the MLA for Palakkad. It was alleged that a former Congress MP's daughter also came forward, stating that she had received a marriage proposal prior to long sexual relationship from the politician, but he later refused to marry her, citing she belongs to a lower caste and the fact that she was not a Nair. Media also reported the circulation of an audio clip purported to feature him urging a woman to terminate a pregnancy; he disputed its authenticity, and Kochi City Police said they were seeking legal opinion on a complaint based on the clip. The Congress suspended him from the party and made him an independent MLA in assembly, and gave him a separate chamber from the UDF side.

In his anticipatory bail plea, Mangoottathil admitted to engaging in a sexual relationship that allegedly resulted in a pregnancy. Following this, additional women came forward alleging that he had promised marriage but later distanced himself after engaging in sexual relationships with them.

In August 2025, the Kerala Crime Branch constituted a Special Investigation Team (SIT) under ADGP H. Venkatesh to probe accusations of sexual misconduct against Mamkoottathil. On 7 December 2025, a new SIT headed by Assistant Inspector General G. Poonguzhali IPS was appointed to locate him after he remained absconding in a rape case, with the team handling three related cases. He was arrested in Palakkad on 11 January 2026, after being taken into custody from a hotel, in connection with the case.

On 4 December 2025, Mamkoottathil was expelled from the Congress Party. The expulsion was approved by the All India Congress Committee (AICC).

== Political career ==
Mamkootathil began his political career in 2006 as a member of the Kerala Students Union (KSU) while pursuing his undergraduate studies at Catholicate College, Pathanamthitta. In 2007, he was elected president of KSU's Adoor constituency and also assumed the role of president for the Indian Youth Congress in the Peringanadu mandalam committee. Over the years, he held several leadership positions, including university counselor, Pathanamthitta district president of KSU, and national secretary of the National Students' Union of India (NSUI). He also served as KSU state general secretary, Youth Congress state general secretary, and Youth Congress state secretary, in addition to being a member of the Kerala Pradesh Congress Committee (KPCC). In 2023, Mamkootathil was elected as the state president of the Indian Youth Congress, Kerala.

In the November 2024 by-election to the Palakkad constituency, Mamkootathil, representing the Indian National Congress (INC), was elected as the Member to the Kerala Legislative Assembly. He won by a margin of 18,840 votes over the Bharatiya Janata Party (BJP) candidate.

== Personal life ==
In addition to his political career, Mamkootathil is also engaged in various business ventures. He owns a men's beauty parlour and holds partnerships in a medical shop and a children's clothing store. He also runs a Milma agency.
