= M. B. Rajesh =

Indian politician (born 1971)

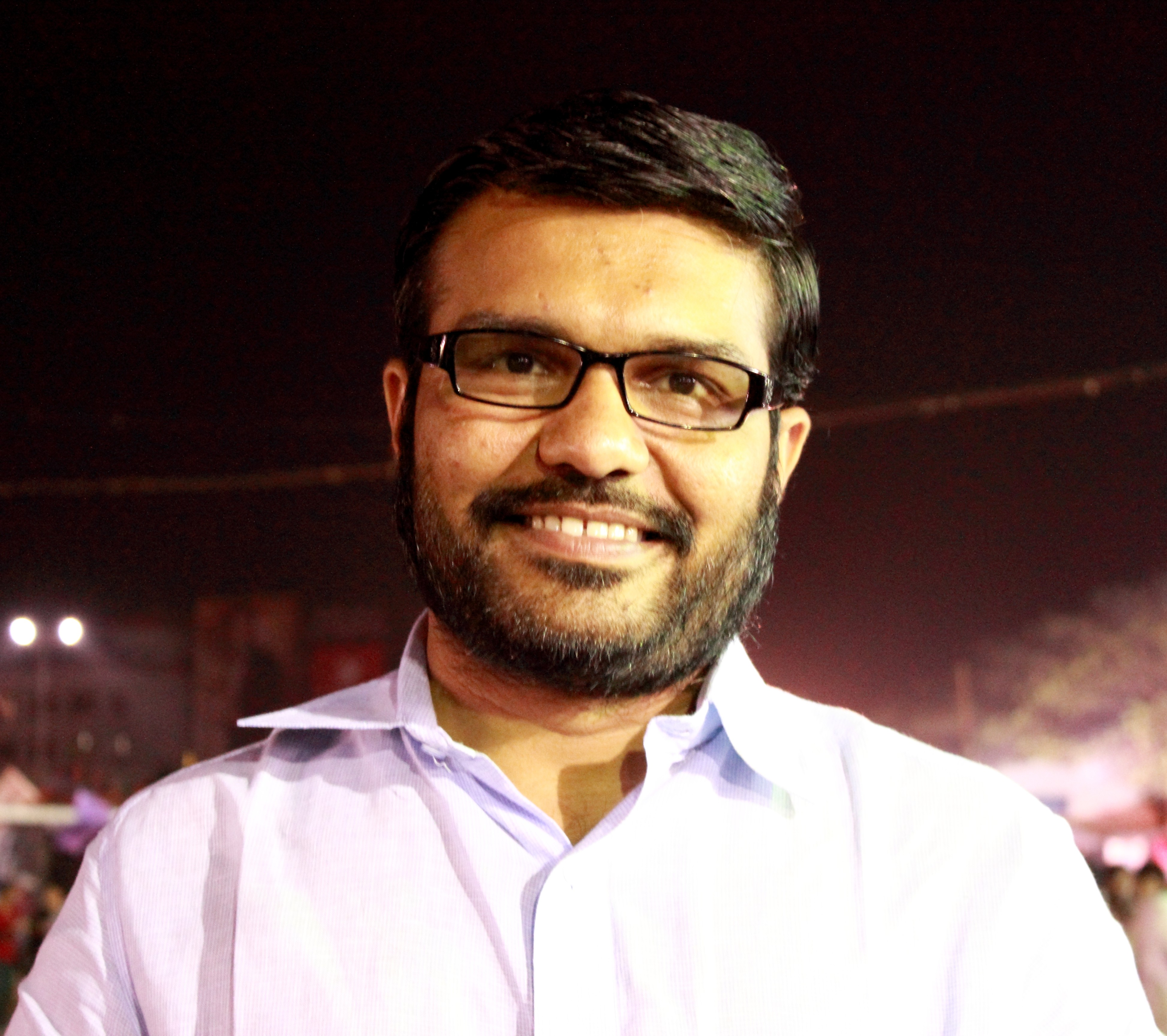

Minister for Local Self Governments and Excise, Government of Kerala
- In office 6 September 2022 – 23 May 2026
- Governor: Arif Mohammad Khan
- Chief Minister: Pinarayi Vijayan
- Departments: Local Self Governments Department; Excise Department; Parliamentary Affairs Department
- Preceded by: M.V. Govindan (Local Self Governments & Excise); K. Radhakrishnan (Parliamentary Affairs)
- Succeeded by: M. Liju (Excise); K.M. Shaji (Local Self Governments); Sunny Joseph (Parliamentary Affairs)

23rd Speaker of the Kerala Legislative Assembly
- In office 25 May 2021 – 3 September 2022
- Preceded by: P. Sreeramakrishnan
- Succeeded by: A N Shamseer

Member of the Kerala Legislative Assembly
- In office 2021 – 2026
- Preceded by: V. T. Balram
- Succeeded by: V. T. Balram
- Constituency: Thrithala

Member of Parliament, Lok Sabha
- In office 31 May 2009 – 23 May 2019
- Preceded by: N. N. Krishnadas
- Succeeded by: V. K. Sreekandan
- Constituency: Palakkad

Minister of Parliamentary Affairs
- In office 23 June 2024 – 23 May 2026
- Preceded by: K. Radhakrishnan

Personal details
- Born: 12 March 1971 (age 55) Jalandhar, Punjab, India
- Party: Communist Party of India (Marxist)
- Spouse: Ninitha Kanicheri
- Children: 2
- Parents: Balakrishnan Nair; M. K. Remani
- Education: Bachelor of Laws; Master of Economics
- Alma mater: Government Law College, Thiruvananthapuram; NSS College, Ottapalam

M. Balakrishnan Nair Rajesh (born 12 March 1971) is an Indian politician who served as the Minister for Local Self-Governments and Excise of Kerala, from 2022 to 2026 and Minister of Parliamentary Affairs, from 2024 to 2026. He previously served as the Speaker of the Kerala Legislative Assembly from 2021 to 2022 and previously represented Thrithala State Assembly Constituency in the 15th Kerala Legislative Assembly from 2021 to 2026. He was previously a Member of the Lok Sabha representing Palakkad Lok Sabha Constituency from 2009 to 2019.

== Life ==
Rajesh was born in Jalandhar, Punjab on 12 March 1971 as the eldest son of Balakrishnan Nair and M. K. Remani. A native of Kayiliad, Chalavara, Shornur in Palakkad, Rajesh graduated in law from Government Law College, Thiruvananthapuram and post-graduated in economics from NSS College, Ottapalam. By profession, he is an advocate. Rajesh is married to Ninitha Kanicheri, who is an assistant professor at Sree Sankaracharya University of Sanskrit.

== Political career ==
Rajesh started his political life while he was a school student by organizing the Students' Federation of India at the school level. Later he became the President and then Secretary of SFI Kerala State Committee. He also held positions including the Joint Secretary and Vice President of SFI Central Committee. After his student life, he was active in the DYFI where he became the National President. Rajesh was elected MLA in the 15th Kerala Legislative Assembly and was elected to role of speaker of the assembly from 2021 to 2022 and later served as the Minister for Local Self Government, Parliamentary Affairs and Excise for the Government of Kerala from 2022 till 2026. Rajesh is now a member of the Kerala state committee of CPI(M). He was defeated by V. T. Balram of the Indian National Congress in the 2026 assembly elections in Thrithala legislative constituency in Palakkad district with a margin of 8,385 votes.

== Controversies ==
In February 2021, the appointment of M. B. Rajesh's wife, R. Ninitha Kanicheri, as Assistant Professor in the Department of Malayalam at Sree Sankaracharya University of Sanskrit became the subject of controversy. Professor Umar Tharamel, one of the subject experts on the interview board, alleged that the final rank list had been altered and that candidates with higher academic credentials were overlooked. Opposition parties, including the Indian National Congress and the Bharatiya Janata Party, accused the university authorities of favoritism and nepotism. Rajesh denied the allegations and stated that the appointment had been made through a lawful and transparent selection process. He described the controversy as politically motivated.

In 2025, Rajesh was involved in the controversy surrounding the Kerala government's decision to grant preliminary sanction to Oasis Commercial Private Limited to establish an ethanol, distillery and brewery project at Elappully in Palakkad district. The project was opposed by local residents and opposition parties, who raised concerns regarding water availability, environmental impact and alleged procedural irregularities. As Excise Minister, Rajesh defended the decision, stating that the project would not affect local drinking water supplies and that all statutory procedures had been followed. In December 2025, the Kerala High Court quashed the government order granting preliminary sanction to the project.

== Publications ==
The books published by Rajesh include

- "History Will Impeach Them" (Charithram Avare Kuttakarennu Vilikkum) collection of articles on education, published in Malayalam, 2002
- "Agolavatkaranathinate Virudha Lokangal" (Contradictory Worlds of Globalisation) collection of articles in Malayalam on globalisation, 2008;
- "Agola Sampathika Prathisandhiyude Manangal", Compilation of articles on Global Recession, 2008, Malayalam

Preceded by N. N. Krishnadas	MP from Palakkad; 31 May 2009 – 23 May 2019	Succeeded by V. K. Sreekandan
