= Ramesh Pisharody =

Indian stand-up-comedian, actor, director, impressionist

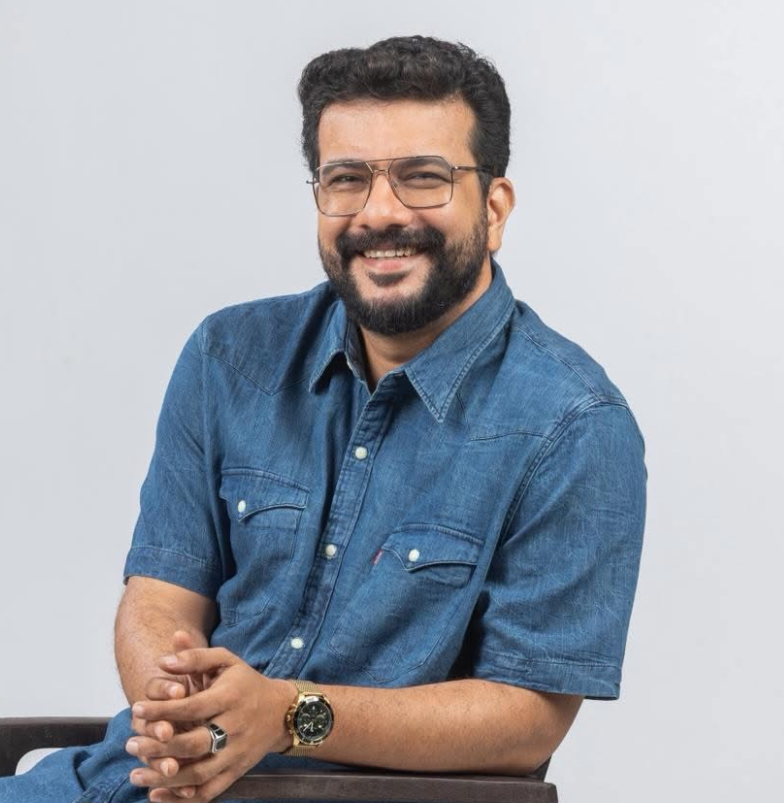
- Pisharody in 2026

Member of Kerala Legislative Assembly
- Incumbent
- Assumed office 21 May 2026
- Preceded by: Rahul Mamkootathil
- Constituency: Palakkad

Personal details
- Born: Ramesh T. V. 1 October 1981 (age 45) Alathur, Palakkad, Kerala, India
- Party: Indian National Congress
- Spouse: Sowmya
- Children: 3
- Occupation: Actor; comedian; director; television presenter; politician
- Website: rameshpisharody.com

Ramesh T. V. (born 1 October 1981), professionally credited as Ramesh Pisharody, is an Indian politician, actor, film director, television presenter, impressionist and stand-up comedian who serves as a Member of the Kerala Legislative Assembly from Palakkad since 2026. A member of the Indian National Congress, he is known for his work in Malayalam television, stage shows and cinema, particularly in observational comedy.

== Early life ==
Pisharody was born as the youngest son in the family and has four siblings. He studied his first and second grades at Kendriya Vidyalaya in Velloor. It was an English-medium school, where he made his mimicry debut by imitating a dog's barking for a musical drama. After putting pressure on his family, he was moved to a Malayalam-medium school from his third grade onward so that he could enjoy holidays on Saturdays. The new school had no school uniform. Since then, he has been participating in mimicry competitions.

After winning second prize at a youth festival at Mahatma Gandhi University, Kerala, he started getting stage programmes. In 2000, he joined Cochin Stallions, the mimicry troupe formed by actor Salim Kumar, where he worked for four years. Meanwhile, he completed his graduation in Politics from Dewaswom Board College, Thalayolaparambu. After which, he teamed up with mimicry artist Sajan Palluruthi and together they did several programmes.

== Film career ==
=== 2000-2007 ===
He joined Salim Kumar's mimicry troupe Cochin Stallions when it was formed in 2000 and worked for four years. He also made his television debut in 2000 in an Onam-special program with Salim Kumar on Asianet. Three years later, he began working with comedians Sajan Palluruthy and Kalabhavan Prajod in the comedy program Comedy Show on Asianet. Later, he went on to work in more comedy programs in Asianet, such as Cinemala, Five Star Thattukada, and Comedy Cousins. It was while working in Cinemala he first met Dharmajan Bolgatty, both of them would later team up to form a comedy duo. When Asianet Plus was launched in 2005, Pisharody and Dharmajan co-hosted the comedy show Bluffmasters. The show was a breakthrough in their career and it ran for more than 450 episodes. Besides, he also frequently performs on stage as a stand-up comedian.

=== 2008-2017 ===
He debuted as a film actor through Positive (2008) in a prominent supporting role. Although his first release was Nasrani (2007) in which he played a minor role. He then went on to act in several Malayalam films, mostly in supporting roles. In the 2014 film To Noora with Love, he acted in a negative role. His first leading role was in the comedy film Kappal Muthalaali (2009). His other notable films include Celluloid (2013), Left Right Left (2013), Immanuel and Amar Akbar Anthony. In 2013, Dharmajan and Pisharody teamed again for the comedy series Badai Bungalow on Asianet with Pisharody as co-host (with Mukesh) and Dharmajan as actor. It aired for five years.

=== 2018-2026 ===
Pisharody made his directional debut in 2018 through the comedy-drama Panchavarnathatha starring Jayaram and Kunchacko Boban, which received favourable reviews and successful run at the box office. His second directional venture was Ganagandharvan with Mammootty. On 5 May 2026, following his election victory from the Palakkad Assembly constituency, Ramesh Pisharody announced a five-year break from films and stage shows to focus on public service in Palakkad.

== Political career ==
Ramesh Pisharody had been associated with the Indian National Congress for several years before formally entering electoral politics. He frequently participated in Congress events, campaign programmes and public meetings across Kerala, .

In March 2026, the Congress announced Pisharody as the United Democratic Front candidate for the Palakkad Assembly constituency in the 2026 Kerala Legislative Assembly election. The constituency witnessed a high-profile triangular contest between Pisharody, Bharatiya Janata Party candidate Sobha Surendran representing the NDA, and N. M. R. Razak backed by the Left Democratic Front.

The Palakkad contest became one of the most closely watched battles of the election due to the constituency's history of close contests and the prominence of the candidates. During the campaign, Pisharody focused on local development issues including infrastructure, employment opportunities, agriculture, healthcare and public transport. His campaign style, which blended humour and public interaction with political messaging, attracted significant attention across Kerala media.

In the election, Pisharody secured 62,199 votes and defeated Sobha Surendran, who received 49,052 votes, by a margin of 13,147 votes. LDF-backed candidate N. M. R. Razak finished third with 33,931 votes.

Following his victory, Pisharody announced that he would take a temporary break from films, television programmes and stage performances to focus on his responsibilities as MLA and public service in Palakkad..

== Personal life ==
Ramesh is married to Soumya and the couple have three children.

== Filmography ==
Key
†	Denotes films that have not yet been released

=== As actor ===
==== Films ====
Year	Title	Role	Notes
2007	Nasrani	Biju Cherian (TV Reporter)	Cameo
2008	Positive	Cherry	Debut film
2009	Achanum Ammayum Chirichappol	Binoy Eepan	
2009	Kappal Muthalaali	Bhoominathan	Leading role
2011	Maharaja Talkies	Avinash	
2011	Veeraputhran	Akbar	
2012	Manthrikan	Subrahmanyan	
2013	Celluloid	Pillai	
2013	Immanuel	Venkatesh	
2013	Left Right Left	Chandradas BBVP member	
2014	Salala Mobiles	Shajahan	
2014	Manja	Krish K.K	
2014	Vasanthathinte Kanal Vazhikalil		
2014	Peruchazhi	Minister's assistant	
2014	Nakshathrangal	Vinod	
2014	To Noora with Love	Brother James	
2015	Amar Akbar Anthony	Nallavanaya Unni	
2015	Charlie	Sojan	Cameo
2016	Aadupuliyattam	Sunny	
2016	Oru Muthassi Gadha	Fejo	
2016	Angane Thanne Nethave Anjettennam Pinnale	Wilson Puthuppally	
2017	Ramante Edanthottam	Varmaji	
2017	Achayans	Fr. Jose Keerikkadan	
2017	GandhiNagaril Unniyarcha	Das Injathotty	
2018	Daivame Kaithozham K. Kumar Akanam	TV News reader	
2018	Kuttanadan Marpappa	Peter	
2018	Chalakkudikkaran Changathi	Production Controller	
2018	Chanakya Thanthram	Music director	Cameo
2018	Laughing Apartment Near Girinagar	Sunny	
2019	Madhura Raja	Newsreporter	
2019	Pattabhiraman	Unni	
2019	Kumbarees	Psycho Ramu	
2019	Ulta	Purushothaman	
2021	The Priest	Dr. Sanjay	
2021	Mohan Kumar Fans	Sajimon	
2021	Laughing Budha		
2021	Archana 31 Not Out	Satheeshan	
2022	No Way Out	David Cheriyan	
2022	CBI 5: The Brain	Vinay, C.B.I. Officer	
2022	Malikappuram	Unni	
2023	Pendulum	Dr. Jain Joseph	
2023	Voice of Sathyanathan	YouTuber Stephen	
2023	Queen Elizabeth	Abhi	
2024	Pattapakal		
2024	Idiyan Chandhu	Unmesh Kumar	
2024	Oru Anweshanathinte Thudakkam	Rajesh Jeevan's friend	
2024	Porattu Naadakam		
2025	Aap Kaise Ho		
2026	Pennu Case		
2026	Ashakal Aayiram		
2026	Ee Thani Niram †	TBA	

==== Web series ====
Year	Title	Role	Language	Notes
2024	Nagendran's Honeymoons	Paulose	Malayalam	Disney+ Hotstar

=== As director ===
Year	Film	Lead Cast	Notes
2018	Panchavarnathatha	Jayaram, Kunchacko Boban, Anusree	Directorial Debut
2019	Ganagandharvan	Mammootty, Vandana	

=== As Dubbing artist ===
Year	Film	Dubbed for	Character
2022	Sita Ramam (Malayalam )	Vennela Kishore	Durjoy Sharma

== Television ==
Year(s)	Program	Role	Channel	Notes
2000	Salam Saleem	Host	Asianet	TV debut
2003–2004	Comedy Nagar Second Street	Various roles	Asianet	
	Comedy Show	Host	Asianet	
2003–2009	Cinemala	Various roles	Asianet	Also as script writer
2004–2009	Bluff Masters	Co-Host	Asianet Plus	with Dharmajan Bolgatty
2006	5 Star Thattukada		Asianet	Serial
2007	Comedy Cousins	Co-Host	Asianet	
2008	Minnum Tharam	Himself	Asianet	
2011	Paattukalude Paattu		Surya TV	Serial
2013–2018	Badai Bungalow	Host	Asianet	Comedy/Celebrity talk show
2015	Cinema Chirima	Host	Mazhavil Manorama	Comedy/Celebrity talk show
2015	Ulagadana Raavu	Host	Flowers TV	Launch event
2015–2017	Evide Ellarkum Sugham	Host	DD Malayalam	Phone-in program
2016–2017	Home Minister	Co-Host	Amrita TV	Game show
2017	D3	Celebrity Judge	Mazhavil Manorama	Reality show
2017	Komedy Circus	Judge	Mazhavil Manorama	Reality show
2017	Lal Salam	Himself	Amrita TV	Keerthi Chakra Promotion
2018	Thakarppan Comedy	Judge	Mazhavil Manorama	Game show
2018	Comedy Utsavam	Judge	Flowers TV	Reality show
2018	Utsavam Super Star	Judge	Flowers TV	Reality show
2018	Comedy Stars Plus	Judge	Asianet Plus	Reality show
2018	Thamasha Bazaar	Himself	Zee Keralam	Comedy talk show
2019–2020	Big Salute	Host; Judge	Mazhavil manorama	Reality show
2019	Paadam Namuk Paadam	Celebrity Judge	Mazhavil Manorama	Reality show
2020	Comedy Stars Season 2	Judge	Asianet	Reality show
2020	Top Singer	Grand finale Judge	Flowers TV	Reality show
2022	Top Singer Season 2	Judge	Flowers TV	Reality show
2020-2021	Engane oru Bharyayum Bharthavum	Judge	Flowers TV	Reality show
2020	Utsavam With Lalettan	Host	Flowers TV	Christmas special program
2021	Super 4 Season 2	Celebrity Judge	Mazhavil Manorama	Reality show
2021	Star Magic	Mentor	Flowers TV	Game show
2021-2022	Funs Upon a time season 1	Judge / Producer	Amrita TV	Reality show
2021	Lets Rock And Roll	Participant	Zee Keralam	Game show
2021	Aram+Aram=Kinnaram	Judge	Surya TV	Reality show
2021	Oru Chiri Iru Chiri Bumper Chiri	Celebrity Judge	Mazhavil Manorama	Reality show
2022	Sa Re Ga Ma Pa Keralam	Special Jury	Zee Keralam	Reality show
2022-2023	Funs Upon a time season 2	Judge / Producer	Amrita TV	Reality show
2022-2023	Star Comedy Magic	Mentor	Flowers TV	Game show
2022	Comedy Stars season 3	Judge	Asianet	Reality show
2023	Funs Upon a time season 1	Judge / Producer	Amrita TV	Reality show
2023- 2024	Kidilam	Judge	Mazhavil Manorama	Reality show
2023	Rasakadhanayakan Jayaram	Host	Amrita TV	Special show
2023-2025	Oru Chiri Iru Chiri Bumper Chiri 2	Judge	Mazhavil Manorama	Reality show
2024- present	Funs Upon a time season 4	Judge / Producer	Amrita TV	Reality show
2024	Star Singer season 9	Guest	Asianet	Reality show
2024- present	Ormayilennum	Host	Amrita TV	Chat show
2025-2026	Bumper Chiri Unlimited Chiri	Judge	Mazhavil Manorama	
2026-present	Oru Chiri Iru Chiri Bumper Chiri 3	Judge	Mazhavil Manorama	

== Awards ==
- 2015: Asianet Comedy Awards – Best Anchor
- 2016: Asianet Television Awards – Entertainer of the Year
- Kerala Sangeetha Nataka Akademi – Yuva Prathibha Puraskaram (mimicry)
- Asiavision Film Awards – Promising Director in Family Entertainment
- 2018: Flowers TV awards -Best Anchor
- 2019: Mazhavil Entertainment Awards – All-rounder
