= Shafi Parambil =

Indian politician (born 1983)

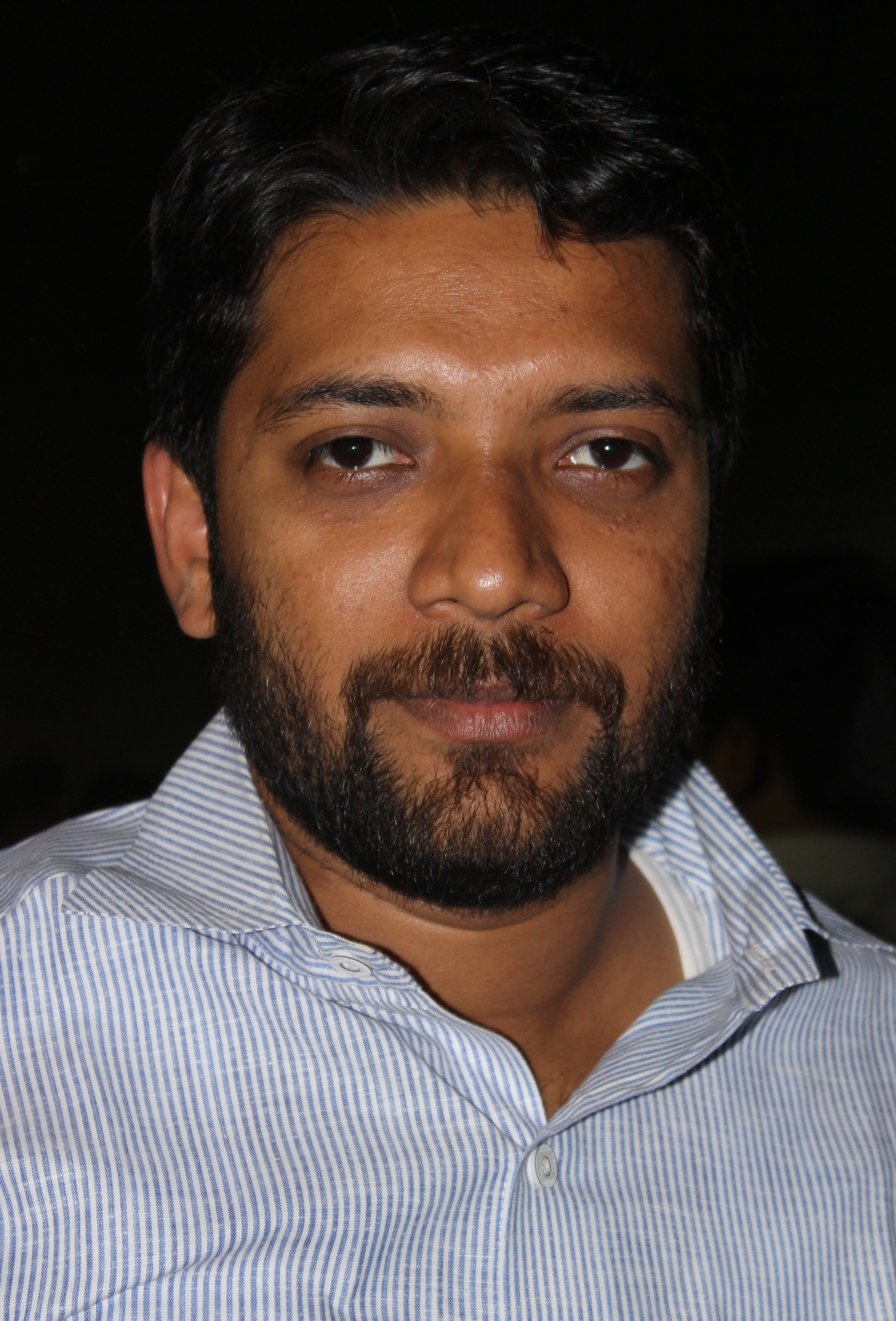

Member of Parliament, Lok Sabha
- Incumbent
- Assumed office 4 June 2024
- Preceded by: K. Muraleedharan
- Constituency: Vatakara

Member of the Kerala Legislative Assembly
- In office 1 June 2011 – 12 June 2024
- Preceded by: K. K. Divakaran
- Succeeded by: Rahul Mamkootathil
- Constituency: Palakkad

Working President Kerala Pradesh Congress Committee
- Incumbent
- Assumed office 9 May 2025

Personal details
- Born: 12 February 1983 (age 43) Karakkad, Pattambi, Palakkad, India
- Party: Indian National Congress
- Spouse: Asheela Ali
- Children: 2
- Parents: Shanavas Parambil; Maimoona Shanavas

Shafi Parambil (born 12 February 1983) is an Indian politician belonging to the Indian National Congress and a member of the 18th Lok Sabha representing the constituency of Vatakara. He had previously served as a Member of the Kerala Legislative Assembly representing Palakkad constituency from 2011 to 2024. His AICC appointment is one of the working presidents of Kerala Pradesh congress committee.

== Political career ==
Shafi Parambil started his political life as a member of the Kerala Students Union. While in college, he was the unit office bearer of KSU and the general secretary of the college union. Shafi Parambil became the State General Secretary in 2007 and State President in 2009.

He was elected thrice to the Kerala Legislative Assembly in 2011, 2016 and 2021. In 2017, Shafi Parambil became the general secretary of Indian Youth Congress, he resigned a year later. In the 2021 Kerala Legislative Assembly election he defeated E. Sreedharan by a margin of 3480 votes in a contest which drew significant attention. In 2024 Lok Sabha election, he contested from Vatakara and was elected with a margin of 1,14,516 votes.

== Personal life ==
Shafi was born in Karakkad, Pattambi on 12 February 1983 to Shanavas Parambil and Maimoona Shanavas. He is an MBA graduate. He is married to Asheela and the couple have a daughter and a son.
