= A. Prabhakaran =

Indian politician

- Marutharoad, Palakkad

Member of the Kerala Legislative Assembly for Malampuzha
- Incumbent
- Assumed office May 2021
- Preceded by: V. S. Achuthanandan

Personal details
- Born: Palakkad, Kerala
- Spouse: Bhama.R

A. Prabhakaran (born 15 May 1952) is an Indian politician serving as the MLA of Malampuzha Constituency since May 2021.
