= A. Seema =

Indian scientist

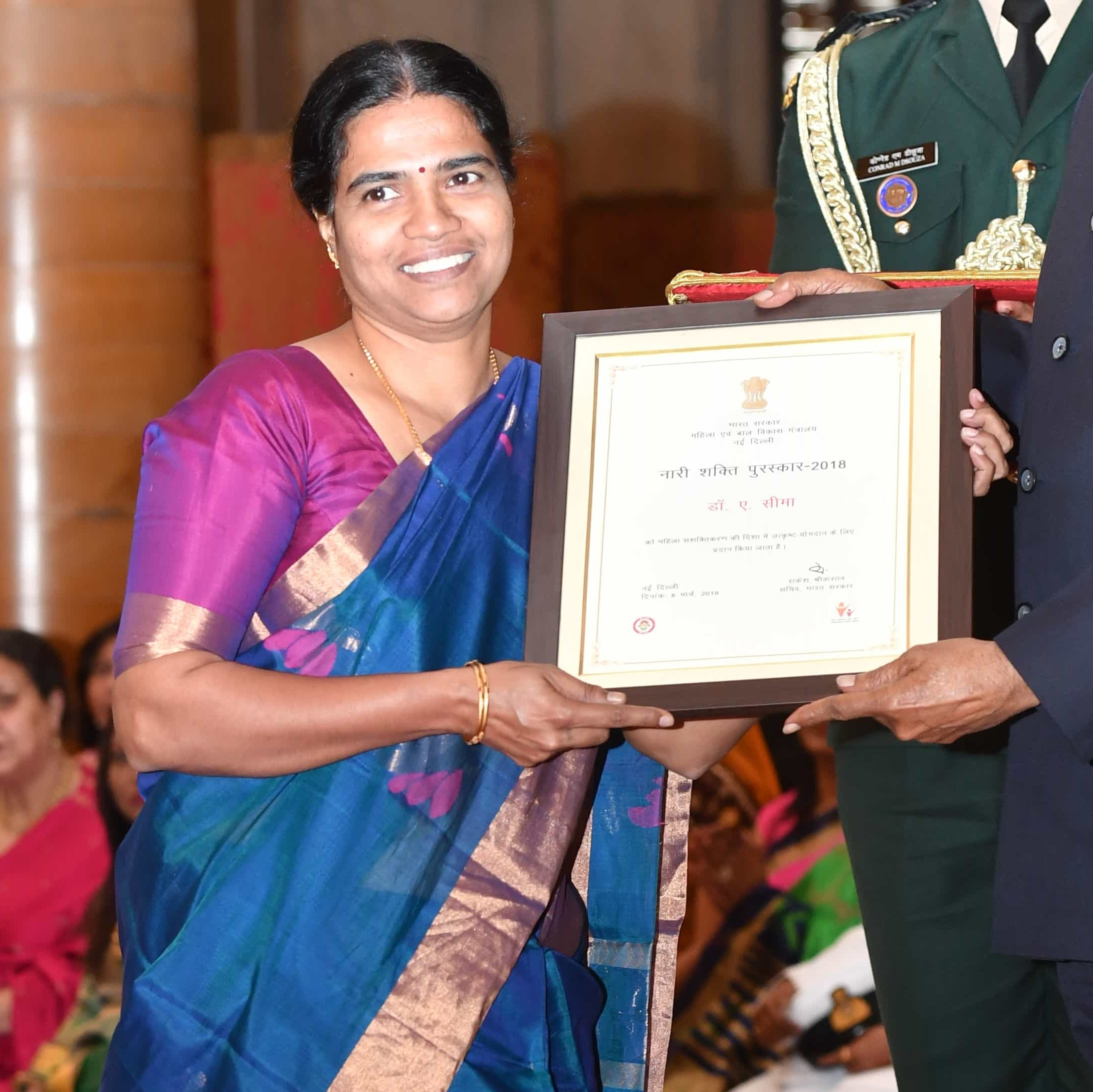
- A. Seema receiving the Nari Shakti Puraskar
- Born: Kozhikode
- Education: M.Tech and PhD
- Occupation: scientist
- Employer: Centre for Materials for Electronics Technology (C-MET)
- Known for: creating a portable device to indicate breast cancer

A. Seema is an Indian scientist from Kerala who led a team that developed a bra that indicates whether the person wearing it has breast cancer. After it was sent for commercial development, she was awarded the Nari Shakti Puraskar in 2019 for her (and her team's) work.

== Life ==
Seema comes from Kozhikode, a large city in the Indian state of Kerala. She studied to obtain a master's degree in technology before going on to gain her doctorate. After this she joined the publicly funded research facility in Kerala named the Centre for Materials for Electronics Technology (C-MET).

She led a team who were challenged by the Malabar Cancer Centre, Thalassery to find a device that was more portable than an x-ray machine that could be used to diagnose whether a woman had breast cancer. The device they created looks like a sports bra and can be worn for a short time to gain a diagnosis. Not only is the device much easier than submitting to a mammogram, the new device does not require a radiologist to supervise the procedure. The new device also has the advantage that it can be used by women and girls as young as fifteen. Body shape is not an issue and the device is expected to cost about R$450.

Seema was recognised with the Nari Shakti Puraskar, presented by Ram Nath Kovind, the President of India. She went to New Delhi as the award ceremony was held at the President's palace, Rashtrapati Bhavan, on International Women's Day in 2019. 41 women received the award and three were given to groups. The Minister of Women and Child Development Maneka Gandhi was there and afterwards the awardees met the Prime Minister Narendra Modi.
