= List of leaders of the opposition in the Kerala Legislative Assembly =

Leader of Opposition of the Indian state of Kerala

Leader of Opposition of Kerala
- Pratipakṣa Nētāv
- Seal of the Government of Kerala

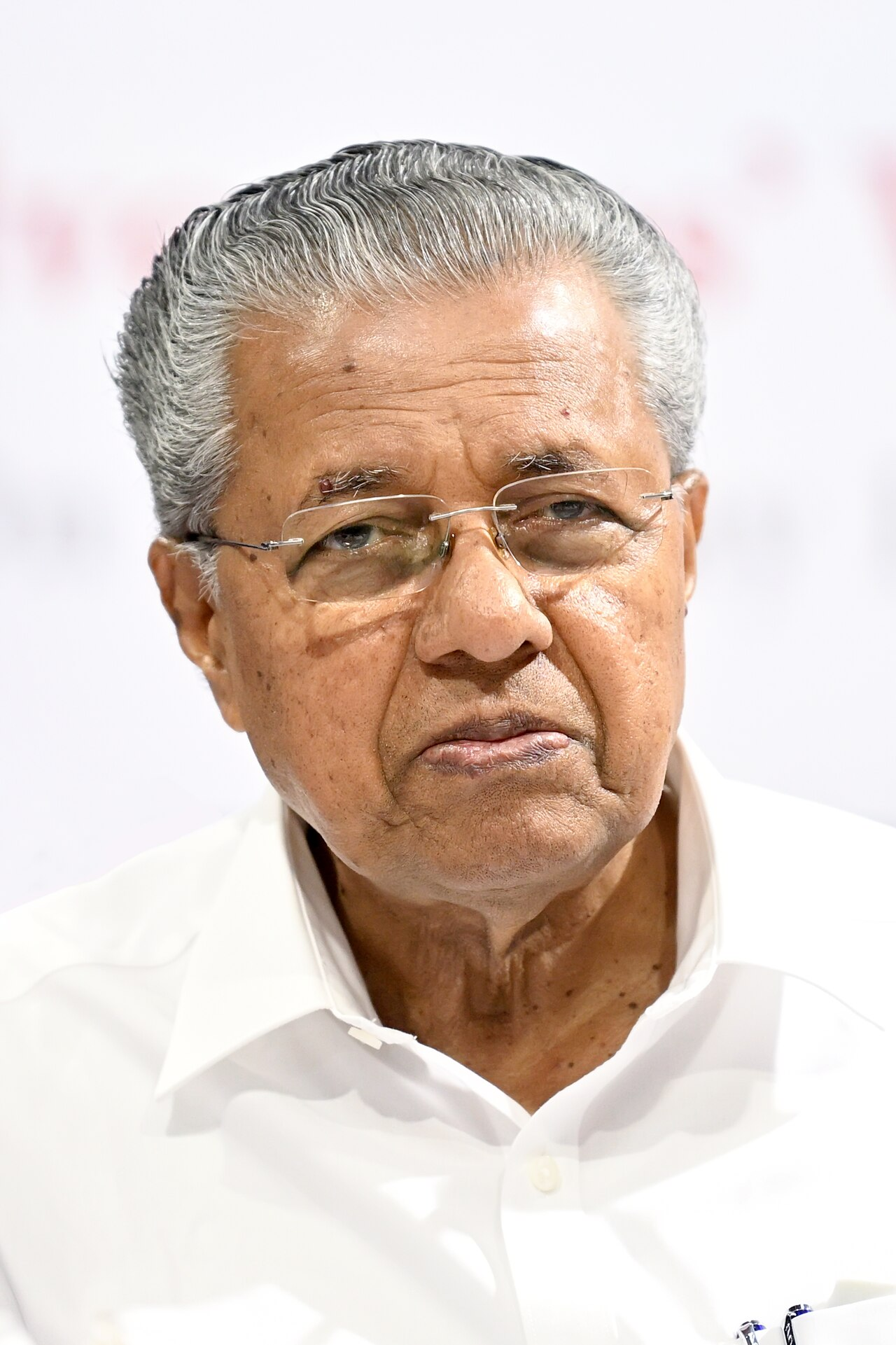
- Incumbent; Pinarayi Vijayan since 18 May 2026
- Style: The Honourable
- Status: Leader of Opposition
- Member of: Kerala Legislative Assembly
- Residence: Cantonment House, Thiruvananthapuram
- Seat: Kerala Niyamasabha
- Appointer: Governor of Kerala
- Term length: 5 years
- Precursor: V. D. Satheesan
- Inaugural holder: P. T. Chacko (1957–1959)
- Formation: 5 April 1957; 69 years ago
- Deputy: K. Rajan

The post of Leader of the Opposition in the Kerala Legislative Assembly has been held by 12 politicians since the Assembly was established in 1957. All have belonged to either the Indian National Congress, the Communist Party of India or the Communist Party of India (Marxist). The current Leader of the Opposition is Pinarayi Vijayan since 18 May 2026. V. S. Achuthanandan has served as Leader of the Opposition for 15 non-consecutive years which makes him the longest serving leader of the opposition in Kerala Legislative Assembly.

== List of Leaders of Opposition ==
Key

INC CPI CPI(M)

SL No.	Portrait	Name	Constituency	Party	Term of office		Assembly	Chief Minister	Term of office
SL No.	Portrait	Name	Constituency	Party	From	To	Assembly	Chief Minister	Term of office
1		P. T. Chacko	Vazhoor	Indian National Congress	5 April 1957	31 July 1959	1st (1957-59)	E. M. S. Namboodiripad	2 years, 117 days
2		E. M. S. Namboodiripad	Pattambi	Communist Party of India	22 February 1960	10 September 1964	2nd (1960-64)	Pattom Thanu Pillai R. Sankar	4 years, 201 days
3		K. Karunakaran	Mala	Indian National Congress	6 March 1967	1 November 1969	3rd (1967-70)	E. M. S. Namboodiripad	2 years, 240 days
(2)		E. M. S. Namboodiripad	Pattambi	Communist Party of India (Marxist)	1 November 1969	1 August 1970	3rd (1967-70)	C. Achutha Menon	273 days
(2)		E. M. S. Namboodiripad	Pattambi	Communist Party of India (Marxist)	4 October 1970	25 March 1977	4th (1970-77)	C. Achutha Menon	6 years, 172 days
(2)		E. M. S. Namboodiripad	Alathur	Communist Party of India (Marxist)	25 March 1977	22 February 1978	5th (1977-79)	K. Karunakaran A. K. Antony	334 days
(3)		K. Karunakaran	Mala	Indian National Congress	23 February 1978	13 August 1979	5th (1977-79)	A. K. Antony P. K. Vasudevan Nair	1 year, 171 days
4		T. K. Ramakrishnan	Thrippunithura	Communist Party of India (Marxist)	13 August 1979	11 October 1979	5th (1977-79)	P. K. Vasudevan Nair	59 days
5		P. K. Vasudevan Nair	Alappuzha	Communist Party of India	11 October 1979	1 December 1979	5th (1977-79)	CH Mohammed Koya	51 days
(3)		K. Karunakaran	Mala	Indian National Congress	25 January 1980	20 October 1981	6th (1980-82)	E. K. Nayanar	1 year, 268 days
6		E. K. Nayanar	Malampuzha	Communist Party of India (Marxist)	28 December 1981	17 March 1982	6th (1980-82)	K. Karunakaran	79 days
6		E. K. Nayanar	Malampuzha	Communist Party of India (Marxist)	24 May 1982	25 March 1987	7th (1982-87)	K. Karunakaran	4 years, 305 days
(3)		K. Karunakaran	Mala	Indian National Congress	26 March 1987	17 June 1991	8th (1987-91)	E. K. Nayanar	4 years, 83 days
(6)		E. K. Nayanar	Thrikaripur	Communist Party of India (Marxist)	24 June 1991	29 February 1992	9th (1991-96)	K. Karunakaran	250 days
7		V. S. Achuthanandan	Mararikulam	Communist Party of India (Marxist)	1 March 1992	9 May 1996	9th (1991-96)	K. Karunakaran A. K. Antony	4 years, 69 days
8		A. K. Antony	Cherthala	Indian National Congress	20 May 1996	13 May 2001	10th (1996-2001)	E. K. Nayanar	4 years, 358 days
(7)		V. S. Achuthanandan	Malampuzha	Communist Party of India (Marxist)	17 May 2001	12 May 2006	11th (2001-06)	A. K. Antony Oommen Chandy	4 years, 360 days
9		Oommen Chandy	Puthuppally	Indian National Congress	18 May 2006	14 May 2011	12th (2006-11)	V. S. Achuthanandan	4 years, 361 days
(7)		V. S. Achuthanandan	Malampuzha	Communist Party of India (Marxist)	18 May 2011	20 May 2016	13th (2011-16)	Oommen Chandy	5 years, 2 days
10		Ramesh Chennithala	Haripad	Indian National Congress	25 May 2016	20 May 2021	14th (2016-21)	Pinarayi Vijayan	4 years, 360 days
11	VD_Satheesan	V. D. Satheesan	Paravur	Indian National Congress	22 May 2021	18 May 2026	15th (2021-2026)	Pinarayi Vijayan	4 years, 361 days
12		Pinarayi Vijayan	Dharmadam	Communist Party of India (Marxist)	18 May 2026	Incumbent	16th (2026-2031)	V.D. Satheesan	128 days

== Leaders of the Opposition who have served as Chief Minister ==
S.No.	Name	No: of terms served as chief minister	Tenure as chief minister	No: of terms served as leader of the opposition	Tenure as leader of the opposition
1.	E.M.S. Namboodiripad	2	1957-59, 1967-69	4	1960-64, 1969-70, 1970-77, 1977-78
2.	K. Karunakaran	4	1977, 1981-82, 1982-87, 1991-95	4	1967-69, 1978-79, 1980-81, 1987-91
3.	A.K. Antony	3	1977-78, 1995-96, 2001-04	1	1996-2001
4.	P.K. Vasudevan Nair	1	1978-79	1	1979
5.	E.K. Nayanar	3	1980-81, 1987-91, 1996-2001	3	1981-82, 1982-87, 1991-92
6.	Oommen Chandy	2	2004-06, 2011-16	1	2006-11
7.	V.S. Achuthanandan	1	2006-11	3	1992-96, 2001-06, 2011-16
8.	Pinarayi Vijayan	2	2016-21, 2021-26	1	2026-31
9.	V. D. Satheesan	1	2026-31	1	2021-26

E.M.S. Namboodiripad, A.K. Antony, E.K. Nayanar, Oommen Chandy, P.K. Vasudevan Nair and Pinarayi Vijayan first served as Chief Ministers before occupying the post of Leader of the Opposition.

K. Karunakaran, V.S. Achuthanandan and V. D. Satheesan served as Leader of the Opposition before becoming Chief Minister.

P.T. Chacko, T.K. Ramakrishnan and Ramesh Chennithala have not served as Chief Minister. Conversely, Pattom A. Thanu Pillai, R. Sankar, C. Achutha Menon and C. H. Mohammed Koya have not served as Leader of the Opposition.

== Statistics ==
No.	Name	Party	Length of term		No: of terms
No.	Name	Party	Terms	Total years in office	No: of terms
1	V. S. Achuthanandan	CPI(M)	1992-96, 2001-06, 2011-16	14 years, 65 days	3
2	E. M. S. Namboodiripad	CPI(M)/CPI	1960-64, 1969-70, 1970-77, 1977-78	12 years, 220 days	4
3	K. Karunakaran	INC	1967-69, 1978-79, 1980-81, 1987-91	8 years, 118 days	4
4	E. K. Nayanar	CPI(M)	1981-82, 1982-87, 1991-92	5 years, 270 days	3
5	Oommen Chandy	INC	2006-11	4 years, 361 days	1
6	Ramesh Chennithala	INC	2016-21	4 years, 360 days	1
7	A. K. Antony	INC	1996-2001	4 years, 358 days	1
8	V. D. Satheesan	INC	2021-2026	4 years, 361 days	1
9	P. T. Chacko	INC	1957-59	2 years, 117 days	1
10	T. K. Ramakrishnan	CPI(M)	1979	60 days	1
11	P. K. Vasudevan Nair	CPI	1979	51 days	1
12	Pinarayi Vijayan	CPI(M)	2026–present	128 days	1

== See also ==
- Kerala Council of Ministers
- Deputy Chief Ministers of Kerala
- Chief Ministers of Kerala
