= Modernising Government Programme =

Modernising Government Programme (MGP) is a combination of Administrative Reform, Service Delivery Improvement, Asset Management and Fiscal Reforms initiatives implemented in the Government Departments of Kerala State, India.

The programme was funded by the Asian Development Bank under the title 'Modernising Government and Fiscal Reforms Programme, Kerala'. The programme has defined following five themes as the five pillars on which the reform initiatives would be mounted.

== Five Pillars of Reform ==
1. Ensuring Assured Levels of Basic Services to the Poor (Minimum Needs Programme)
2. Building an enabling environment for growth
3. Fiscal Sustainability- State and Local
4. Enhancing effectiveness and efficiency of core Government functions
5. Efficient, Effective and Accessible Local Self Governments

Through extensive consultations with all kind of stakeholders and experts, 96 general initiatives were identified for implementation through 19 Government Departments. These general initiatives were for policy changes including simplification of rules and procedures in all departments for making them more people friendly. Most of the above initiatives were identified based on the recommendations of the three Administrative Reforms Committees worked after the formation of Kerala State in 1956.

{Also refer to : Administrative Reforms in Kerala, India}

The Government of Kerala has also adopted a people centric service delivery policy and a training policy for government officials.

Another facet of the programme was Service Delivery Project (SDP). The important goal of SDP was to build necessary infrastructure for supporting the sustenance of reforms brought in through the implementation of said general initiatives as well as the service delivery and training policies.

Another important aspect of MPG is that, the programme was monitored using a Programme Performance Monitoring System (PPMS)developed using open source technology.

== Important Documents ==
Important documents related to the programme are:

- Strategic Document
- Strategic Implementation Plan
- Schematic Outline of Detailed Implementation Plan
- Detailed Implementation Plan
- Service Delivery Project
- Service Delivery Policy
- Training Policy
