= SNC-Lavalin Kerala hydroelectric scandal =

1995 financial scandal in India

A financial scandal related to a hydroelectric infrastructure contract between the Government of Kerala and the Canadian company SNC-Lavalin in 1995 resulted in an alleged net loss to the Indian exchequer of ₹374.5 crore.

The contract outlined the renovation and modernization of the hydroelectric power stations at Pallivasal, Sengulam, and Panniar that were originally installed between 1940 and 1964 in the Idukki district of Kerala, India.

Several politicians were involved and eventually charged in the case, including the ex-chief minister Pinarayi Vijayan, the first ever corruption-related prosecution of a Politburo member of the Communist Party of India (Marxist). However, on 5 November 2013, Pinarayi Vijayan and 6 other accused were temporarily cleared of charges by a Central Bureau of Investigation (CBI) Special Court because "the CBI could not prove any of its charges". The CBI then went on with an appeal in Kerala High Court. On 23 August 2017, the Kerala High Court ruled on the case, and Pinarayi Vijayan was acquitted again. As of July 2020, CBI's petition against acquittal of Pinarayi Vijayan is pending in the Supreme Court of India.

== History ==
In 1992, the Central Electricity Authority (CEA) of India rejected a proposal of Kerala State Electricity Board (KSEB) to renovate the three hydro-electric power projects at Pallivasal, Sengulam and Panniar. Instead, the CEA recommended a capacity upgradation of the generators in these three power projects, after they found that these projects were in good condition. The KSEB disregarded this recommendation and went forward with the decision to renovate these projects.

=== Initial negotiations ===
The initial negotiations with the Canadian company SNC-Lavalin – a company which had been present in the state's power sector for several decades – began during the tenure of United Democratic Front government, under the leadership of the then power minister C. V. Padmarajan and later, the Kerala State Electricity Board (KSEB) signed a memorandum of understanding (MoU) with SNC-Lavalin on 10 August 1995, when G. Karthikeyan of the Congress Party was the power minister, after the resignation of C.V. Padmarajan. Under the provisions of the MoU, the funds for the renovation were to be arranged by SNC-Lavalin from the Export Development Canada (EDC), Canada, and the Canadian International Development Agency (CIDA). Later, it was also found out in a probe by CBI, that G. Karthikeyan also wanted a quid-pro-quo assistance from the Canadian government for the setting up a hospital for granting a project for refurbishment of Pallivasal, Shengulam and Panniyar Hydro electric stations in Kerala, after the revelation of a letter by G Karthikeyan to the then vice-president of Lavalin business operations, Klaus Triendl, who is also an accused in the Lavalin scandal. It was only in September 1995, that the KSEB undertook a feasibility study on the proposal, by a retired Chief Engineer of the KSEB, who later became a consultant to SNC-Lavalin.

=== Consultant's report ===
Based on the consultant's report and further discussions, the KSEB under the leadership of G. Karthikeyan, signed the contracts with SNC-Lavalin to provide technical services for management, engineering, procurement and construction supervision on 24 February 1996, to ensure completion of the projects within three years. The consultancy agreement did actually include the rates for various equipments to be purchased as part of the project. Consultancy agreements were converted into fixed price contracts for the supply of machinery and technical services as part of the renovation at a cost of 67.94 million Canadian dollars (Rs 1690.3 million). The final follow-up agreement with SNC-Lavalin regarding the renovation of PSP project was signed by Pinarayi Vijayan of Left Democratic Front – after they took office winning the majority in legislative assembly in 1996 – in February 1997. Technically, the Left Democratic Front (Kerala) led government could not retreat from the agreements, even if they wanted to, according to the provisions of the MoU which was already signed by their predecessors, that is the ministers of United Democratic Front government.

=== Contract signed ===
After the final contract was signed, the entrusted the National Hydroelectric Power Corporation Limited (NHEPCL) a study to justify the prices quoted by Lavalin, and they concluded in that study that in view of the grant to the proposed Malabar Cancer Centre (MCC), the purchase of Canadian equipment and accessories could be considered favorably.

=== Comptroller and Auditor General findings ===
The Comptroller and Auditor General (CAG) found that Lavalin was only a consultant intermediary and not the original equipment manufacturer and that the supply of goods and services was made by other firms at a much higher cost leading to excess expenditure. According to the CAG, the absence of due professional care in negotiating the foreign loan proved to be detrimental to the financial interests of the Board. The Board also could not ensure the quality of renovation work in the absence of technology transfer and training of its engineers. Owing to various technical defects in the equipment, the generation of power could not be maintained even at the pre-renovation level and the Board had to spend on repairs.

According to the CAG, failure to exclude the fee for technical consultancy from fixed price contracts resulted in an avoidable payment of Rs 203.1 million, and failure to negotiate and exclude the exposure fee from the loan agreement resulted in avoidable payment of Rs 94.8 million and future liability of Rs 22.1 million. In the opinion of the CAG, there was also an avoidable payment of Rs 12.0 million as commitment fee despite there being committed but unavailed advance.

The CAG found that the Government did not receive Rs 893.2 million out of the grant of Rs 983.0 million that was promised for the Malabar Cancer Centre as the MoU was not renewed in time during the tenure of United Democratic Front when Kadavoor Sivadasan was the minister in charge of power.

=== Inquiry ===
On 16 January 2007, Kerala High Court ordered a CBI enquiry into the scandal.

On 18 February 2008, the CBI informed the High court of Kerala that the investigation was progressing and said that former Electricity Ministers Pinarayi Vijayan and G. Karthikeyan would be examined at the appropriate time.

On 21 January 2009, the CBI filed a progress report on the investigation in the Kerala High Court. Pinarayi Vijayan had been named as the 9th accused in the case.

=== Sanctions ===
On 2 February 2009, the CBI wrote a letter to the Governor of Kerala, seeking sanction for the prosecution of Pinarayi Vijayan under section 197 of the CrPC, who later referred it to the cabinet .

On 6 May 2009, the Cabinet opined that it was not necessary to grant permission to prosecute Pinarayi Vijayan.

On 31 August 2011, the Supreme Court of India issued notices to the Government of Kerala and the CBI, on a petition filed by Pinarayi Vjayan, challenging the then Kerala Governor, R.S. Gavai's nod to prosecute the former, over-riding the decision of the council of ministers, after he wrongly assumed that he had jurisdiction and power to grant sanction on his own. The proceedings against Pinarayi Vijayan initiated in the special court was stayed by this order.

On a petition seeking discharge from the case before the CBI Special Court Thiruvananthapuram, Pinarayi Vijayan and the other accused were discharged from the case on 5 November 2013. The court said that the CBI had failed to prove the charges of conspiracy and cheating against the seven petitioners who had sought the discharge and that it had no hesitation in holding that the allegations against them were "groundless". The prosecution had failed to establish any dishonest and fraudulent intention, abuse of official position, or element of cheating, which the accused were charged with, Special Judge R. Raghu said in a much-awaited judgment.

The Special Court judge said that the prosecution had not made case that any of the accused gained undue pecuniary advantage by awarding the contract to SNC-Lavalin. It had, on the other hand, attempted to pose two "contradictory and mutually destructive" allegations: one, that the act of awarding the contract to the company was "dishonest" and "fraudulent"; and two, that the consideration for awarding the contract was the offer of a grant to establish the cancer hospital, which was, in fact, a laudable objective involving the public interest. The court said the only question that remained for consideration in the case was whether there was any "administrative failure or blunder" that took place "without understanding the ramifications of the offer of grant" from various Canadian agencies in return for the award of the supply contract to SNC-Lavalin.

=== Appeal ===
An Appeal Petition has been filed by journalist T. P. Nandakumar in Kerala High Court against the exoneration of Vijayan by the CBI court.

== See also ==
- SNC-Lavalin affair, a political scandal in Canada involving the same company
