= Administrative reforms in Kerala =

Administrative Reform is a tool or process for improving administrative effectiveness and efficiency. Former Chief Minister V. S. Achuthanandan resigned from the post of chairman of the Kerala Administrative Reforms Commission on 30 January 2021.

== Administrative Reforms Commission (ARC) ==
Kerala has had four Administrative Reforms Commissions since its formation in 1956. The first Commission, under the chairmanship of late Shri. E. M. S. Namboodiripad, was constituted in 1957 and the second Commission was set up under Shri. M. K. Vellodi, ICS in 1965.

The third one was under the chairmanship of Shri E. K. Nayanar in 1997. The third one was submitted in 2000–2001.

The fourth commission set up under former chief minister Shri V. S. Achuthanandan in 2016.

Former Chief Minister V. S. Achuthanandan resigned from the post of chairman of the Kerala Administrative Reforms Commission on 30 January 2021.

== Terms of Reference for Third ARC ==
The third ARC came into being in May 1997, with the former Chief Minister E. K. Nayanar as its chairman. The Terms of Reference required the Third ARC (TARC), among other things:

1. To review the working of the Administrative Machinery in the State and the systems and procedures under which it functions with a view to assess their adequacy and suitability for a democratic Government in a welfare State responsive to the needs and aspirations of the people, in particular the backward and weaker sections of the society.
2. In the light of the above, to suggest measures calculated to improve the efficiency of the administrative machinery to enable it to cope with the developmental activities in a welfare State.
3. To suggest measures for the further decentralization of the power at various levels so as to ensure expeditious dispatch of business in all public offices including local bodies and maximum satisfaction to the public.
4. To suggest measures to eliminate delays, lethargy, corruption, and nepotism in the Administration and to make it result oriented.
5. To suggest measures to cut unnecessary and avoidable paper work and for using modern management techniques in administration.

All the above functions of TARC are explicitly tied to improvements in service delivery. The recommendations of Third Administrative Reforms Commission (TARC) are in 15 reports put together in three volumes.

== The Vision of 3rd ARC ==
The Third Administrative Reforms Commission has developed a vision of responsive administration and its recommendations were designed to attain this vision. The salient features of the vision are:

- A people centered form of governance is to be aimed at.
- Government at all levels has to give utmost importance to the citizens, and the common man in particular.
- Decentralized governance resulting in the creation of vibrant Local self- governments with clear functional domains, and the power, authority and resources to discharge the assigned functions autonomously, is most conducive for genuine people's participation.
- Administration has to become more efficient for which greater professionalism is called for which can be achieved through constant training and through scientific methods of performance assessment.
- The administration has also to be effective achieving the objectives for which it exists.
- There is need for greater accountability to the people. This can be best achieved by creation of systems institutions facilitating people's participation.
- The commission has vision of a simple and rational administrative system which is understood by all and which is capable of rising up to the expectations of everyone.
- There is a heavy cost in running government and there has to be a constant assessment of costs and return Society has to get the value for the money it spends on administration.
- In order to attain this vision, one time reform alone would not be sufficient. There has to be a dynamic product... with constant refining and redefining.

Later, Government of Kerala has prepared a Modernising Government Programme, chiefly for implementing various recommendations of the Administrative Reforms Commissions.
