= V. S. Achuthanandan =

Indian politician (1923–2025)

Comrade V. S. Achuthanandan
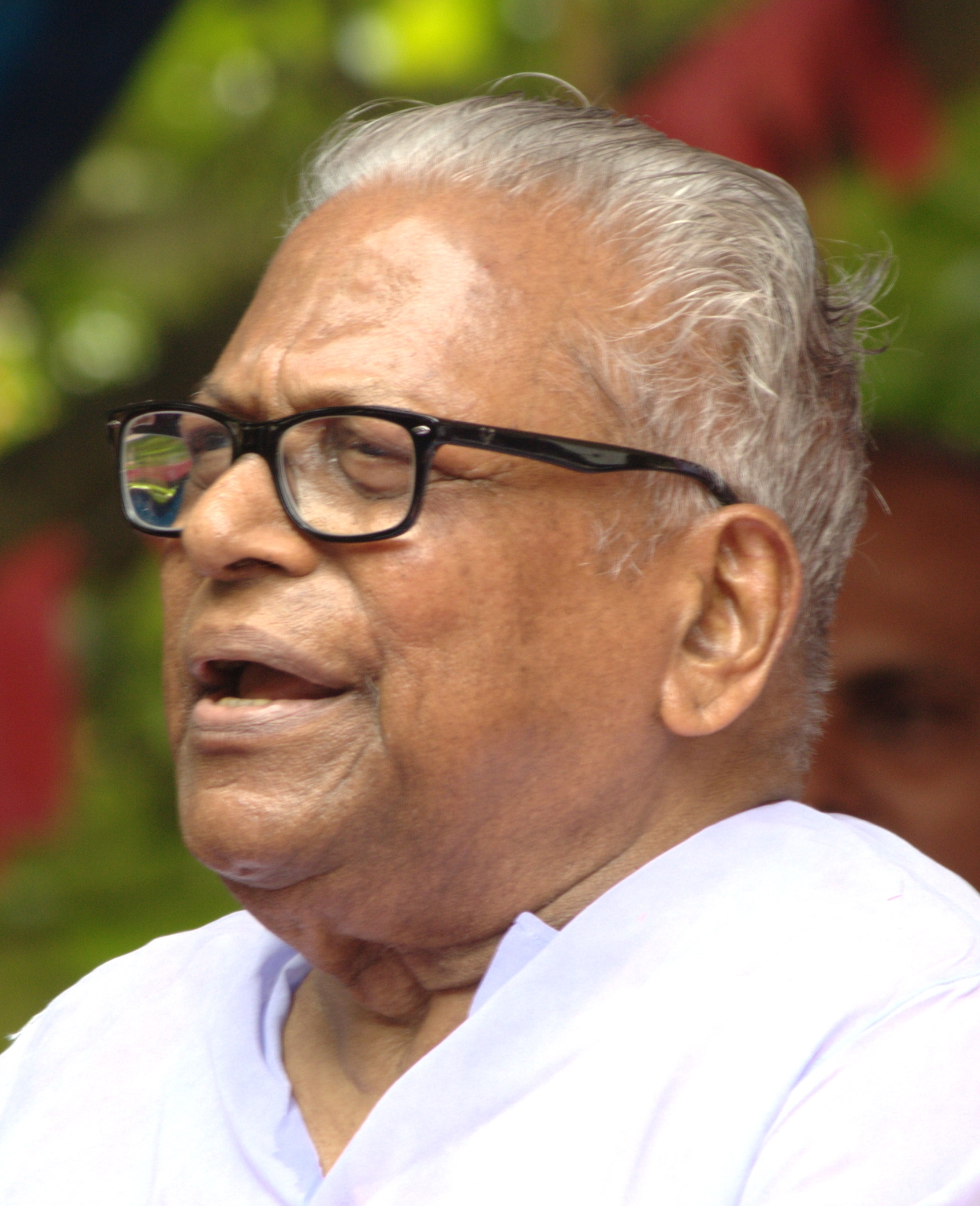
- Achuthanandan in 2016

11th Chief Minister of Kerala
- In office 18 May 2006 – 18 May 2011
- Preceded by: Oommen Chandy
- Succeeded by: Oommen Chandy

4th Chairman of the Kerala Administrative Reforms Commission
- In office 3 August 2016 – 30 January 2021
- Governor: P. Sathasivam; Arif Mohammad Khan
- Preceded by: E. K. Nayanar

Member of the Politburo of the Communist Party of India (Marxist)
- In office 29 December 1985 – 12 June 2009

Leader of the Opposition in Kerala Legislative Assembly
- In office 18 May 2011 – 25 May 2016
- Preceded by: Oommen Chandy
- Succeeded by: Ramesh Chennithala
- Constituency: Malampuzha
- In office 17 May 2001 – 12 May 2006
- Preceded by: A. K. Antony
- Succeeded by: Oommen Chandy
- Constituency: Malampuzha
- In office 1 March 1992 – 9 May 1996
- Preceded by: E. K. Nayanar
- Succeeded by: A. K. Antony
- Constituency: Mararikulam

Secretary of the Communist Party of India (Marxist), Kerala State Committee
- In office 1980 – 1992
- Preceded by: E. K. Nayanar
- Succeeded by: E. K. Nayanar

Member of the Kerala Legislative Assembly
- In office 13 May 2001 – 2 May 2021
- Constituency: Malampuzha
- In office 1991 – 1996
- Constituency: Mararikulam
- In office 1967 – 1977
- Constituency: Ambalappuzha

Personal details
- Born: Velikkakathu Sankaran Achuthanandan; 20 October 1923 Alappuzha, Kingdom of Travancore, India (present-day Alappuzha, Kerala, India)
- Died: 21 July 2025 (aged 101) Thiruvananthapuram, Kerala, India
- Cause of death: Myocardial infarction
- Party: Communist Party of India (Marxist)
- Spouse: K. Vasumathy
- Children: 2
- Awards: Padma Vibhushan (2026) (posthumously)
- Website: vsachuthanandan.in
- Nickname(s): Sakhavu VS; Achumaaman

Velikkakathu Sankaran Achuthanandan (20 October 1923 – 21 July 2025), also known by his initials VS, was an Indian communist politician, independence activist, marxist theoretician, writer and statesman who was the Chief Minister of Kerala from 2006 to 2011. At 82, he was the oldest person to have assumed the office. He was affiliated with the Communist Party of India (Marxist). He served as the chairman of the Kerala Administrative Reforms Commission from 2016 to 2021. He served as the Leader of the Opposition for 15 years, making him the longest serving Leader of the Opposition in the Kerala Legislative Assembly.

Achuthanandan was a member of the CPI(M) Politburo from 1985 until July 2009, when he was reverted to the Central Committee of the party owing to his ideological dispositions.

Achuthanandan initiated various actions as Chief Minister, including the demolition drive in Munnar which reclaimed acres of illegally occupied land, the demolition drive on Kochi's M. G. Road which claimed back the long-lost shoulder of the road, anti-piracy drive against film piracy, and his struggle against the Lottery mafia in the state. He was instrumental in convicting former minister R. Balakrishna Pillai on charges of corruption. Achuthanandan also took the lead in promoting free software in the state, and especially in adopting free software in the public education system of the state.

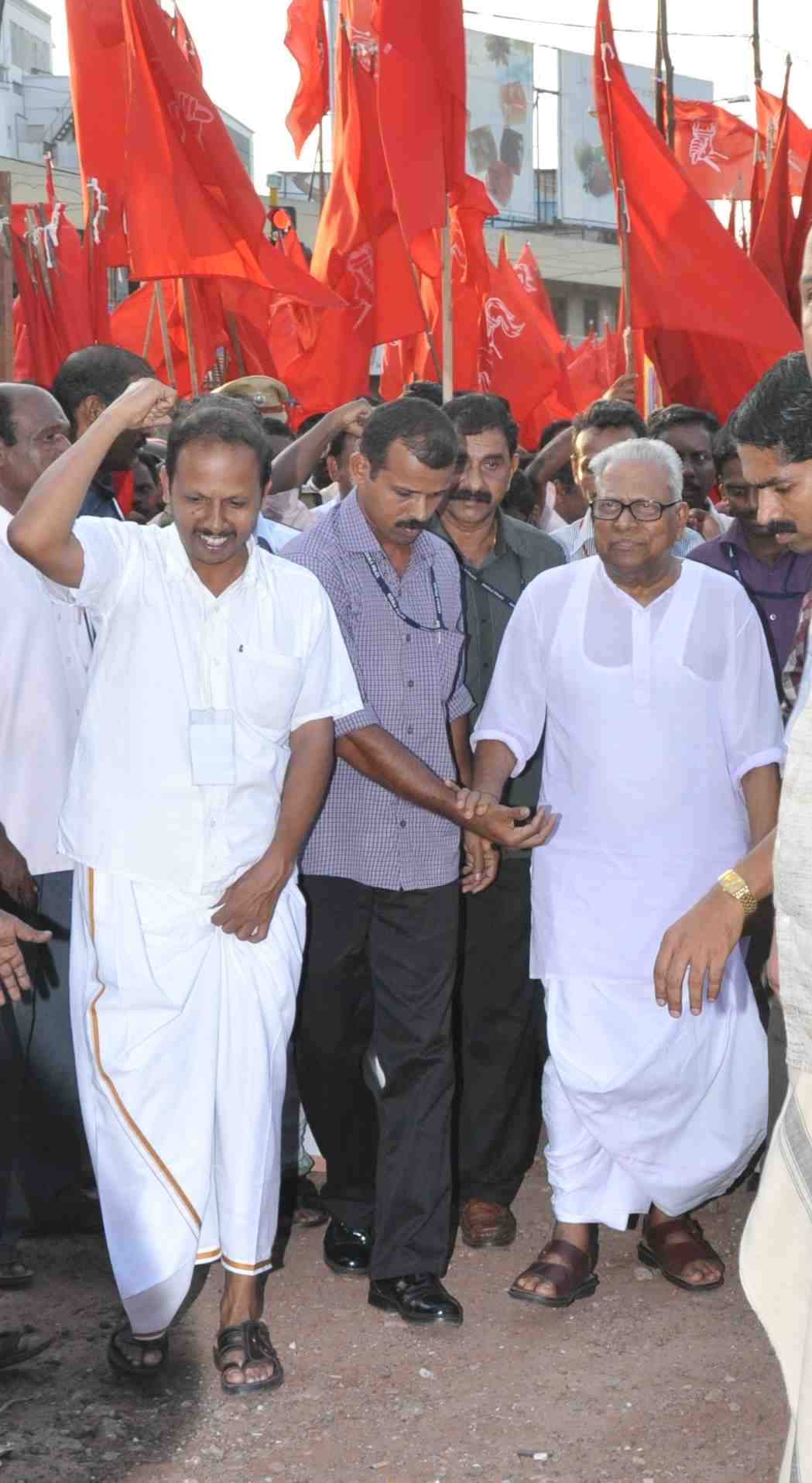
VS at NGO state meet 2012 in Kollam

== Early life ==
Born on 20 October 1923 in a poor Ezhava family to Sankaran and Accamma in Punnapra, Alappuzha, Travancore (part of present-day Kerala state, India), Achuthanandan lost his mother when he was four years old and subsequently lost his father at the age of 11. This forced him to quit his studies after finishing 7th standard in school. He started working by helping his elder brother in a village tailoring shop. Later he took up the job of meshing coir to make ropes at a coir factory. Witnessing the exploitation of labourers and harsh conditions in the coir industry, Achuthanandan began organising coir workers in the 1940s, which marked the beginning of his engagement with the Communist movement.

He began organising coir factory workers under the leadership of Communist leader P. Krishna Pillai. He later played an active role in the Punnapra-Vayalar uprising against the Travancore princely state, during which he was arrested and tortured. His injuries included bayonet wounds on the soles of his feet, and he was beaten till unconscious. The police thought that he had died, so they took his body to Valiyachudukattu for cremation, but the person who was cremating bodies noticed that he was alive. He was then taken to hospital and survived .He spent over five years in jail and more than four years underground.

Achuthanandan was in the forefront of the land struggles in Kerala starting with the Alappuzha declaration in 1970 demanding implementation of the Land Reforms Act passed by the EMS Government in 1967. Later his activities as the leader of the Opposition in the Kerala Assembly had evoked good public response.

== Political life ==
Achuthanandan entered politics through trade union activities and joined State Congress in 1938. In 1940, he became a member of the Communist Party of India (CPI). During his 40 years as a politician he was imprisoned for five years and six months and was in hiding for four and half years. He was a state secretariat member of the CPI in 1957. During the 1962 India-China war, he defied the CPI’s official stance by organising blood donation drives for Indian soldiers, leading to his arrest and removal from the party’s state secretariat. He lived the longest among the 32 members who left the CPI National Council in 1964 to form the Communist Party of India (Marxist) (CPI(M)). In the 1980s, he opposed large dam projects, drawing criticism from the CPI(M) politburo. As Kerala state secretary, he publicly sided with anti-nuclear activists against the Left Front government’s plan to open a nuclear power plant. The CPI(M) Politburo formally censured him for deviating from the party position. He was the Secretary of the Kerala State Committee between 1980 and 1992. He was a member of the CPI(M) Politburo from 1985 until he was removed as a party disciplinary action. He was the senior most leader of CPI(M) in India. In 1990, Two CPI(M) municipal councillors were abducted by extremists in Thrissur. Achuthanandan, then in the state leadership, initially downplayed the incident. The party later reprimanded him for delaying action and summoned Kerala leaders to Delhi for discipline over the affair.

In 1992, following E. K. Nayanar's election to the post of Secretary of the CPI(M) State Committee, Achuthanandan was appointed as the Leader of the Opposition in the state legislature. By the 1996 election, Achuthanandan was considered to be the favourite to assume the post of Chief Minister if the LDF were to assume power. While the LDF won the assembly election by a comfortable margin, Achuthanandan unexpectedly lost from his sitting constituency of Mararikulam. His surprise defeat was attributed to factionalism and infighting within his own party. Achuthanandan's defeat paved the way for Nayanar to assume the office of Chief Minister for an unprecedented third term, thus becoming the longest-serving Chief Minister of Kerala.

=== The drive to reclaim paddy land ===
The anti-reclamation stir launched by the Karshaka Thozhilali Party at Monkombu in 1996–97, under the leadership of Achuthanandan created much controversy. This stir was claimed to be highlighting the serious problem of the widespread conversion of paddy fields into another type of land, affecting the food security of Kerala. But this soon developed into a crop destruction drive. The protest got the sobriquet following the violent methods and crop destruction resorted to by the union cadre. The stir attracted lot of public attention and Achuthanandan was forced to express his disapproval of any destruction of crops. 15 years later, in November 2011, a UDF Minister, who was politically opposed to Achuthanandan, justified this struggle.

After the 1998 CPI(M) Kerala conference, Achuthanandan was rebuked for factional infighting. The party charged that he had orchestrated removals of rivals from state committees (especially targeting CITU leaders).

In the 1990s and 2000s, VS emerged as a prominent leader and became leader of the opposition three times. He led campaigns against land grabs, the lottery mafia and projects like Coca-Cola in Plachimada, which damaged local water sources. He stood with tribal communities during the Muthanga incident and fought for justice in the endosulfan tragedy in Kasaragod.

Election	Constituency	Result	Margin
1965	Ambalappuzha	Lost	2327
1967	Ambalappuzha	Won	9515
1970	Ambalappuzha	Won	2768
1977	Ambalappuzha	Lost	5585
1991	Mararikulam	Won	9980
1996	Mararikulam	Lost	1965
2001	Malampuzha	Won	4703
2006	Malampuzha	Won	20017
2011	Malampuzha	Won	23340
2016	Malampuzha	Won	27142

=== Positions held ===
- 1938 - Member, State Congress
- 1940 - Member, Communist Party of India
- 1952 - Division secretary, Communist Party of India (Alappuzha division)
- 1956 - District secretary, Communist Party of India (Alappuzha district)
- 1957 - State secretariat member, Communist Party of India (Kerala)
- 1958 - Member of National Council of Communist Party of India
- 1964 - Member Central Committee member of Communist Party of India (Marxist)
- 1967 - MLA, Ambalappuzha constituency (Term 1)
- 1970 - MLA, Ambalappuzha constituency (Term 2)
- 1980 - State secretary, CPIM Kerala
- 1985 - Member, Politburo of the CPIM
- 1991 - MLA, Mararikulam constituency (Term 3)
- 1992 - Leader of opposition, Kerala Legislative Assembly (Term 1)
- 2001 - MLA, Malampuzha constituency (Term 4)
- 2001 - Leader of opposition, Kerala Legislative Assembly (Term 2)
- 2006 - MLA, Malampuzha constituency (Term 5)
- 2006 - Chief Minister of Kerala
- 2011 - MLA, Malampuzha constituency (Term 6)
- 2011 - Leader of opposition, Kerala Legislative Assembly (Term 3)
- 2016 - MLA, Malampuzha constituency (Term 7)
- 2016 - Chairman of the Kerala Administrative Reforms Commission

== Chief Minister of Kerala (2006–2011) ==
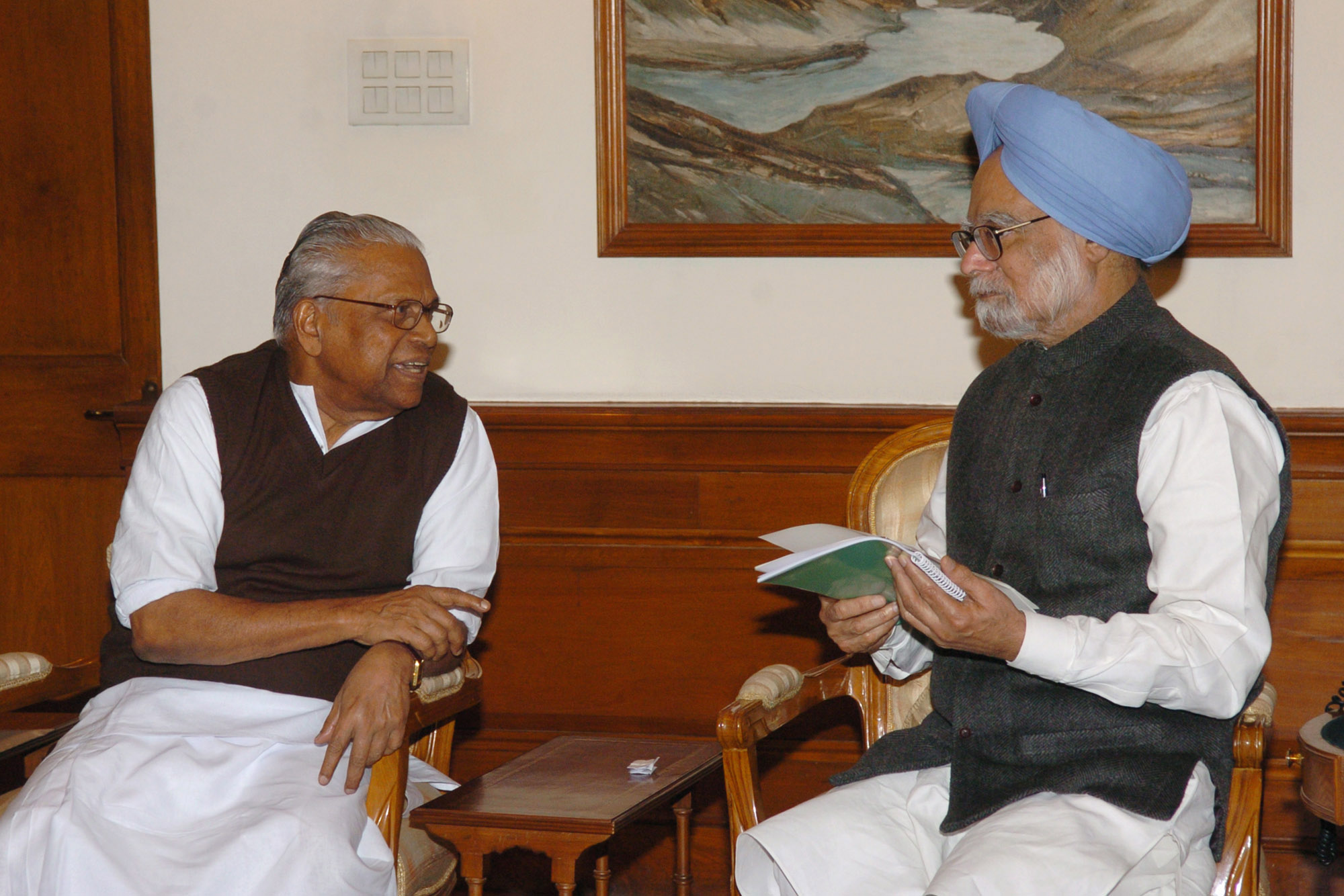
Achuthanandan meeting with then Prime Minister of India, Manmohan Singh in New Delhi (2007)

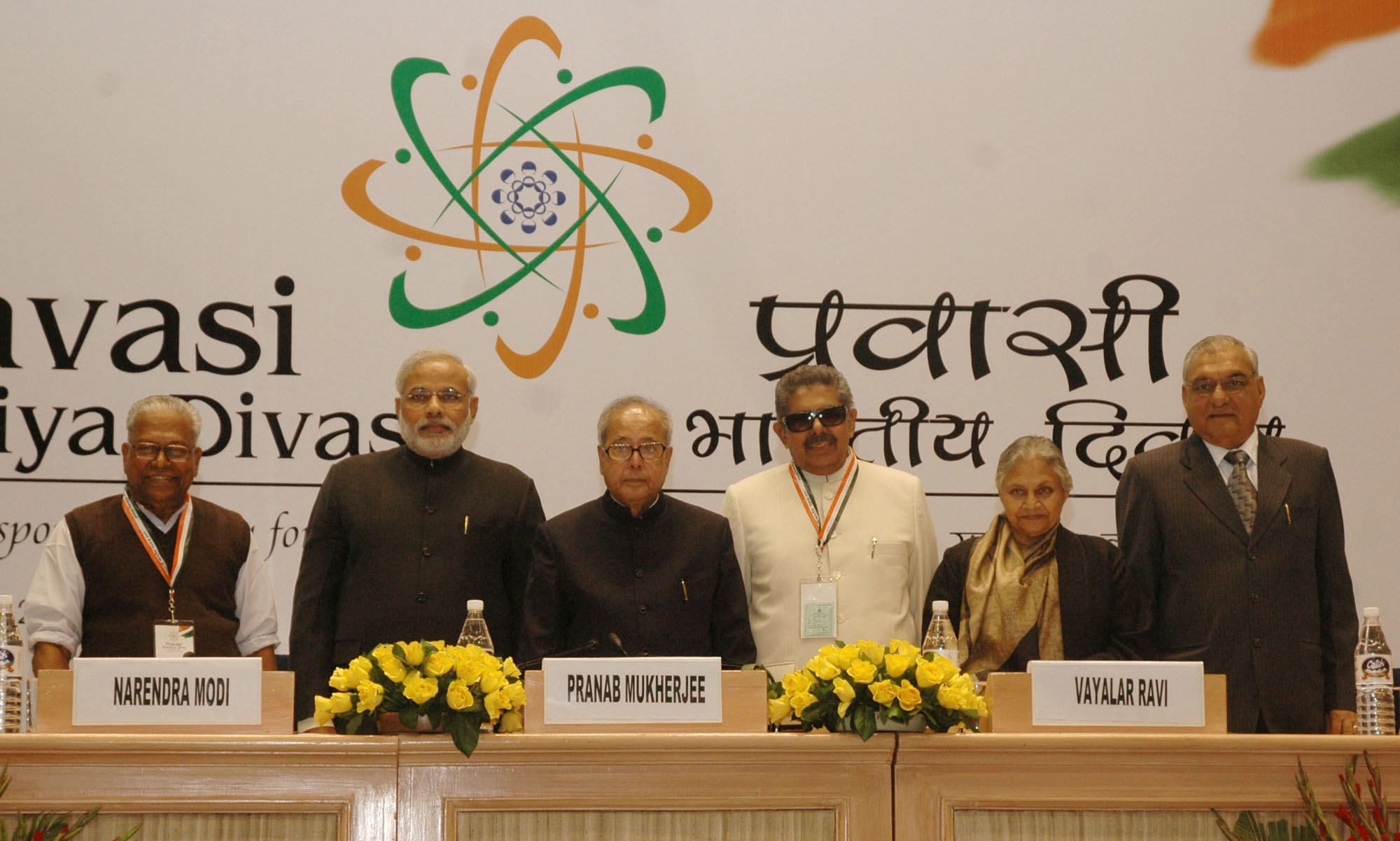
Achuthanandan at the Pravasi Bharatiya Divas Plenary Session in New Delhi at 2008

During the assembly elections held in Kerala in April–May 2006, VS Achuthanandan defeated Satheesan Pacheeni of the United Democratic Front by a margin of 20,017 votes in Malampuzha constituency in Palakkad district. He was sworn in as Chief Minister of Kerala on 18 May 2006, with his 21-member cabinet. Aged 82 years and 7 months at time, he was the oldest Chief Minister of Kerala, and one of the oldest in the whole of India. It is notable that he had been denied a party ticket to contest elections just two months before he was sworn in. He became the 11th Chief Minister of Kerala. On 12 July 2009, the CPI(M) Politbureau and Central Committee removed him from the PB for his stands taken in relation to the accusation and legal procedures against Pinarayi Vijayan in his reported involvement in the SNC Lavalin bribery. During his tenure as Chief Minister, V. S. Achuthanandan strongly opposed the India–ASEAN Free Trade Agreement on the grounds that it could devastate Kerala's cash‑crop sectors—particularly coconut, pepper, rubber, and edible oil producers. He wrote to Prime Minister Manmohan Singh stating that Kerala was not consulted before signing the pact, and warned that liberalised imports could lead to significant price crashes and job losses—estimating up to one million affected livelihoods.

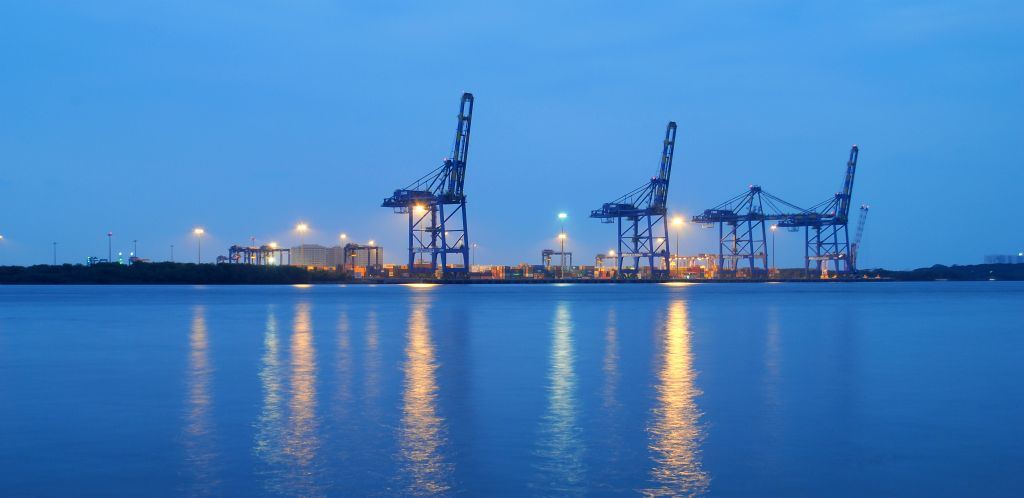
International Container Transshipment Terminal, Kochi

In 2006, Achuthanandan openly criticised his Left allies (e.g. Minister Thomas Isaac and others) for agreeing to a $100 million Asian Development Bank loan. The CPI(M) state leadership warned him that public dissent against coalition partners was unwarranted.

In 2006, under the leadership of Achuthanandan, the government decided to develop and operate an International Container Transshipment Terminal (ICTT), Vallarpadam. Though it is a central-government project, Achuthanandan's government took strong steps to take over land required for road and rail lines for the project. The International Container Transshipment Terminal, Kochi was inaugurated on 11 February 2011; it is the first transshipment terminal in India and the first container terminal to operate in a SEZ.

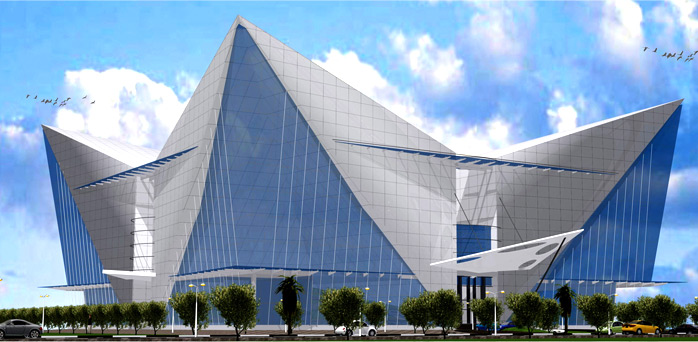
Design of Technopark Phase 2, Kollam

The Technopark Kollam was initiated, planned and constructed during Achuthanandan's government. The plan for setting up the first district IT park in Kerala at Kollam was announced in January 2009. The Foundation stone was laid by Achuthanandan in February 2009. The park was set up expecting employment to the tune of 20,000 and investments of 800 crore rupees. The first phase of the park was inaugurated by Achuthanandan on 15 February 2011.

In May 2007, Achuthanandan and Pinarayi Vijayan (then Kerala CPI(M) secretary) were suspended from the party Politburo due to escalating factional feud. Both were readmitted after six months, but the incident marked a sharp intra-party rift.

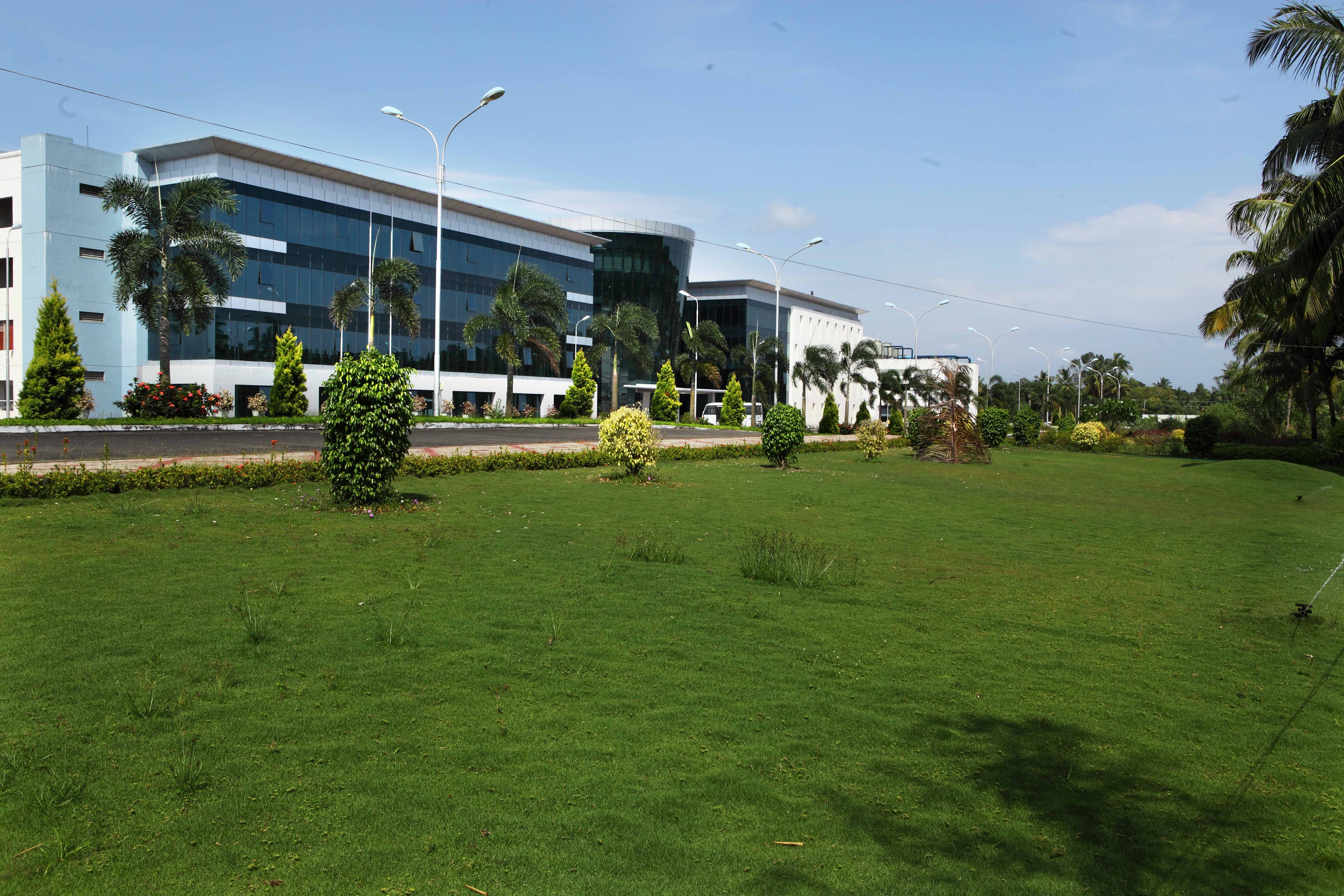
Infopark, Cherthala

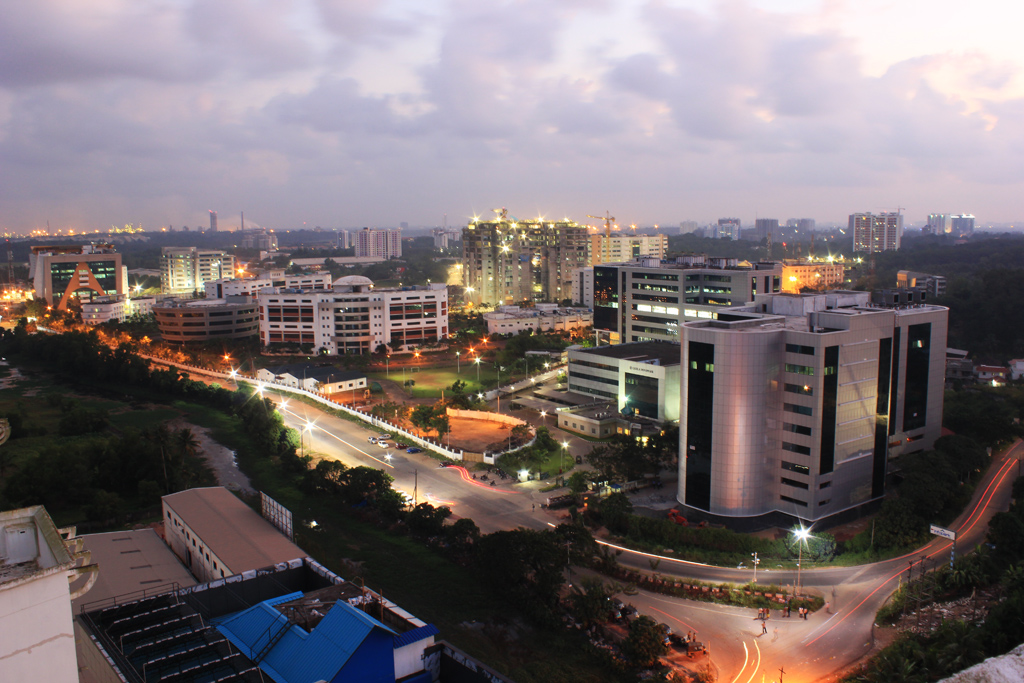
Infopark, Kochi

In 2009, Achuthanandan's ministry started the work of Infopark Cherthala in Alappuzha. The project was inaugurated by Achuthanandan on 10 January 2011. With the state's IT sector witnessing phenomenal growth, it has become necessary to expand Infopark, Kochi, to the satellite towns of the city. Infrastructure development at the IT parks at Infopark Cherthala, Infopark Ambalappuzha and InfoPark Thrissur, which are the satellite units of Infopark, Kochi, were progressing fast. Achuthanandan laid the foundation stone of the second phase of Infopark at Kakkanad. The project is developed on 65 ha (160 acres).

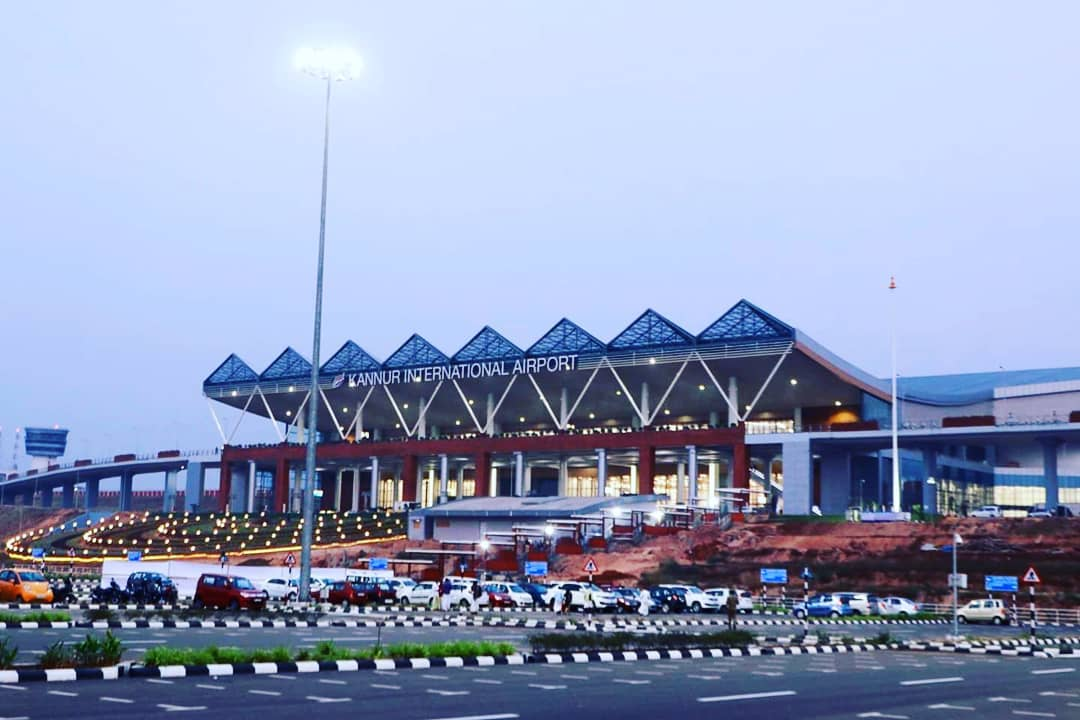
Kannur International Airport

In 2008, the Achuthanandan government proposed an International airport in Mattannur, Kannur. Two years later, Achuthanandan laid the foundation stone for the Kannur International Airport at the project site marking the formal commencement of construction activities on 17 December 2010 at a function attended by the then Civil Aviation Minister Praful Patel.

In 2007, he ordered demolition of dozens of resorts and buildings in the Cardamom Hills (Munnar) to recover alleged encroachments on government forest land. In 2014 the Kerala High Court ruled that many of these demolitions were illegal, with no proper notice or appeal, and ordered the state to compensate and return land to affected resort owners. Achuthanandan, then opposition leader, unsuccessfully sought a review of that judgement. The High Court refused his petition in late 2015, upholding that the evacuations violated judicial process. Critics said the episode reflected poor planning and overreach in his anti-corruption crusade.

In 2008, Achuthanandan's government approved the Kochi Metro rail project in a cabinet meeting held on 2 January 2008 and sent to the Central Government for ratification.

In 2009 he publicly insisted that Pinarayi Vijayan withdraw as state secretary over the SNC-Lavalin corruption case. The party leadership viewed this as 'insubordination'. Achuthanandan was dropped again from the CPI(M) Politburo that year for “deviating from the party position”.

- He initiated action against encroachment on government land in the hill resort and tea plantation town of Munnar.
- On 30 December 2007, he became the first Communist CM to trek to Sabarimala. The 84-year-old Achuthanandan rejected any sort of physical or medical support which worried his doctors.
- V S Achuthanandan supported a free and open-source software movement in the state and Richard Stallman also supported his activities regarding this.
- Major developments in Thiruvananthapuram Technopark including second and third phases of Technopark and technocity
- IT park in Kozhikkode-Cyberpark
- Major IT export growth during his tenure surpassing national average.
- Major renovation of the Malampuzha Tourist destination
- AshtaMudi tourism circuit in Kollam
- Closing down of illegal lottery mafia from the state
- Major initiation against resort mafia including ordinance to take over Kovalam palace
- Laid foundation to Chamravattom Regulator-cum-Bridge, a major project of Malappuram
- VS filed and won the case against Manorama for illegally occupying 162 ha (400 acres) of land of Panthaloor temple.

=== Statement on Islamization of Kerala ===
During a press conference following the PFI's involvement in the 2010 hand-chopping case—where a Kerala college professor, T.J. Joseph, had his hand severed over an alleged blasphemous exam question—Achuthanandan accused the PFI of pursuing an extremist agenda. He said:

The PFI wants to turn Kerala into a Muslim-majority state in the next 20 years. They are using money and marriage to convert people. It is a dangerous trend.

He claimed that the organisation was operating under the guise of social work while allegedly engaging in systematic radicalisation and religious conversions.

At the time, the PFI had been under scrutiny for alleged involvement in multiple communal incidents in Kerala, including the aforementioned assault on Professor Joseph. The group maintained that it worked for the upliftment of marginalised communities, particularly Muslims, but law enforcement agencies had begun monitoring it for suspected extremist links.

Achuthanandan’s statement was made amid growing political concern about the activities of the PFI and similar organisations in southern India. PFI strongly denied Achuthanandan’s allegations, calling them false, Islamophobic, and politically motivated. Several Muslim organisations condemned the remarks, saying they stigmatised the community and fuelled communal narratives. The IUML criticised the statement, while the BJP used it to reinforce its claims about PFI being a security threat. The CPI(M) clarified that Achuthanandan's remarks targeted the extremist outfit, not the Muslim community. Pinarayi Vijayan defended the Chief Minister, warning against misuse of religious platforms for political ends.

In the end, the Indian government banned the Popular Front of India (PFI) in 2022 under the Unlawful Activities (Prevention) Act for alleged involvement in extremist activities. The ban, upheld procedurally by the Supreme Court in 2023, remains in effect through 2025 amid ongoing investigations and arrests.

== Post-chief ministerial career ==
=== 2011 Assembly election ===
The 2011 Kerala Legislative Assembly election, proved to be one of the closest in Kerala's history, with the UDF beating the LDF by a margin of 4 seats. After this election, Achuthanandan was considered the man behind the Uprising of LDF after the 2009 Parliament and 2010 Municipal election losses. The CPI(M) denied a seat to Achuthanandan for the 2011 assembly election. Protests took place across the state and even on social networking sites such as Twitter, Facebook and via SMS. In what can be considered as a near repeat of the 2006 pre-election build-up, the Politbureau of CPI-M impressed upon the state leadership to permit VS Achuthanandan to contest elections for the April 2011 Assembly election in Kerala. VS Achuthanandan contested from the Malampuzha Constituency and won with a margin of around 25,000 votes.

=== 2012 TP Chandrasekharan murder ===
In the wake of the 2012 murder of T. P. Chandrasekharan, Achuthanandan openly supported the victim’s widow, KK Rema, calling her demand for a CBI investigation “just”. In June 2012, during the Neyyattinkara by-election, he defied party orders and personally visited Rema at her home — an act described as a “bolting of conscience” and a rare public break from CPI(M) directives.

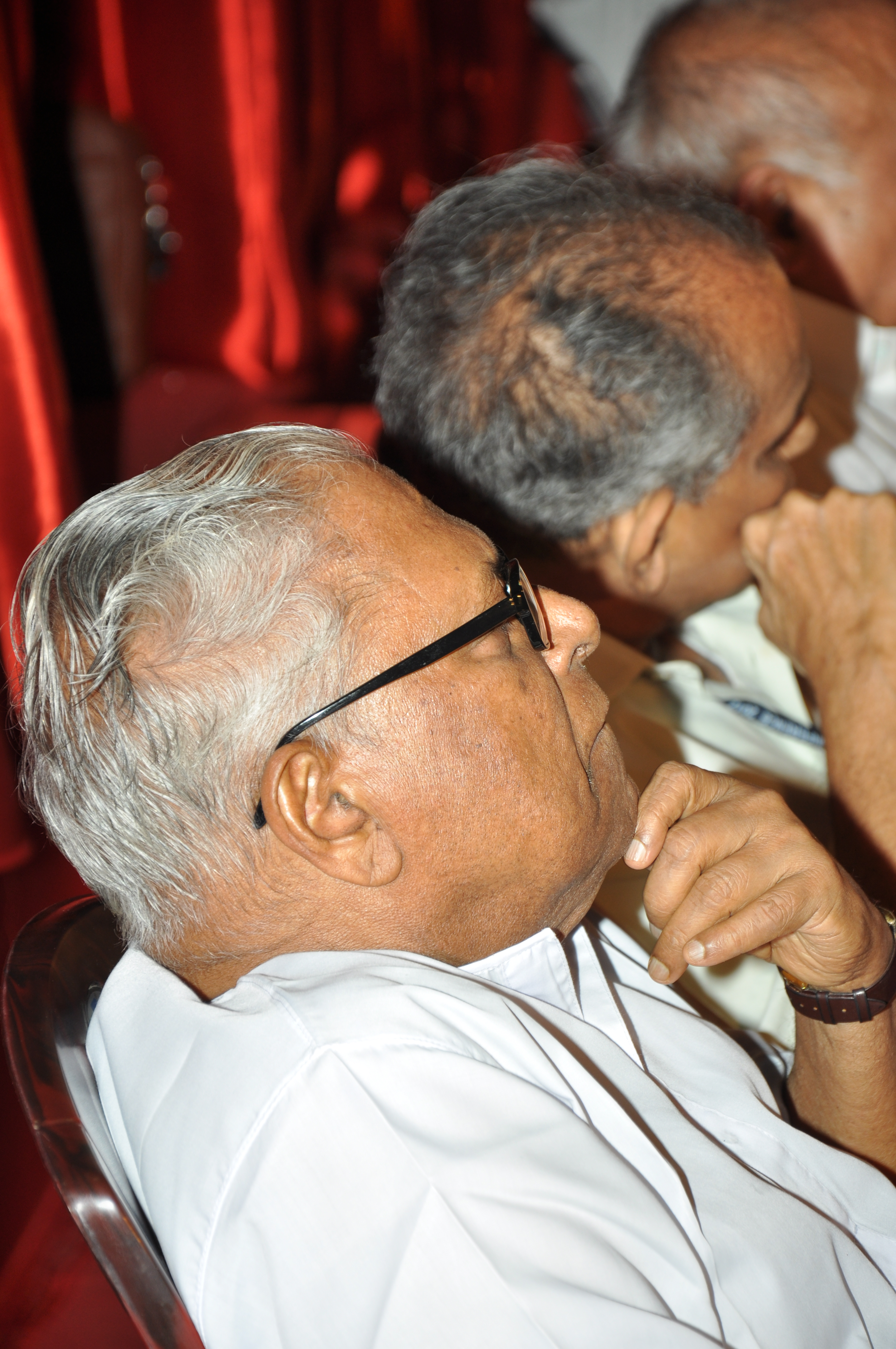
V. S. Achuthanandan at the CPI State Meet, Kollam, 2012

=== 2013 Intraparty rift ===
Early 2013 saw a rift between Achuthanandan and the Kerala CPI(M) leadership. In February 2013 the state party committee formally demanded that he be removed as Leader of Opposition, citing his repeated public criticisms of state secretary Pinarayi Vijayan and allegations that he was politicising issues like the SNC-Lavalin affair. Achuthanandan publicly refused to yield. He reportedly said he had more to say on the matter, though he largely kept silent thereafter.

=== Removal of personal staff ===
In May 2013, the Communist Party of India (Marxist) (CPI-M) took disciplinary action against three of V. S. Achuthanandan's close aides—V.K. Sasidharan (Additional Private Secretary), A. Suresh (Personal Assistant), and K. Balakrishnan (Press Secretary)—on charges of leaking internal party discussions to the media. On 12 May 2013, the Politburo, acting on behalf of the party’s central committee, ordered their removal. The CPI(M) state committee, where Achuthanandan’s intra-party rival Pinarayi Vijayan held an influence, had also recommended removing Achuthanandan from his position as Leader of the Opposition in the Kerala Legislative Assembly. However, on 19 May 2013, the Politburo ratified the expulsion of the staffers but explicitly decided against removing Achuthanandan from his post. According to party insiders, this decision was influenced by Achuthanandan’s enduring popularity, especially in the lead-up to elections. Commenting on the episode, party rival K.M. Shahjahan described the move as a “clipping of the wings” of Achuthanandan.

=== Corruption allegations about his son ===
Meanwhile, July 2013 brought renewed scrutiny of Achuthanandan’s family. The Kerala Vigilance and Anti-Corruption Bureau (VACB) summoned his son Arun Kumar for questioning in connection with corruption allegations dating to the previous UDF government.The inquiry, ordered by then Chief Minister Oommen Chandy, concerned alleged irregular promotions and financial misconduct by Arun in educational and coir industry posts. The VACB reported that Arun cooperated fully and produced documentary evidence of his qualifications. Achuthanandan denied any wrongdoing and characterised the accusations as politically motivated. His son was found out to be innocent.

=== 2014 Attacks on UDF government and party leadership ===
In early 2014, Achuthanandan turned against the Oommen Chandy-led UDF government and on his own party’s state leaders. In March 2014, he accused the UDF government of misrepresenting its achievements. At a press conference, he demanded that a government advertisement claiming over ₹50,000 crore in Central projects be withdrawn as “misleading” – noting that many projects cited (naval academy, Kochi Metro, etc.) originated under the previous LDF regime. He asserted that the Left’s pressure had secured those projects from the Centre and that Chandy’s government was improperly claiming credit. In the same month, speaking at a campaign rally, Achuthanandan charged Chandy with misleading the public about a Kadakampally land-grab court case. He alleged that Chandy’s own former security aide had tampered with land records for corrupt gain, and that the High Court had in fact heard all sides of the case (contrary to Chandy’s claim). These speeches were part of the run-up to the May 2014 Lok Sabha elections, in which Achuthanandan actively campaigned for Left Democratic Front candidates.

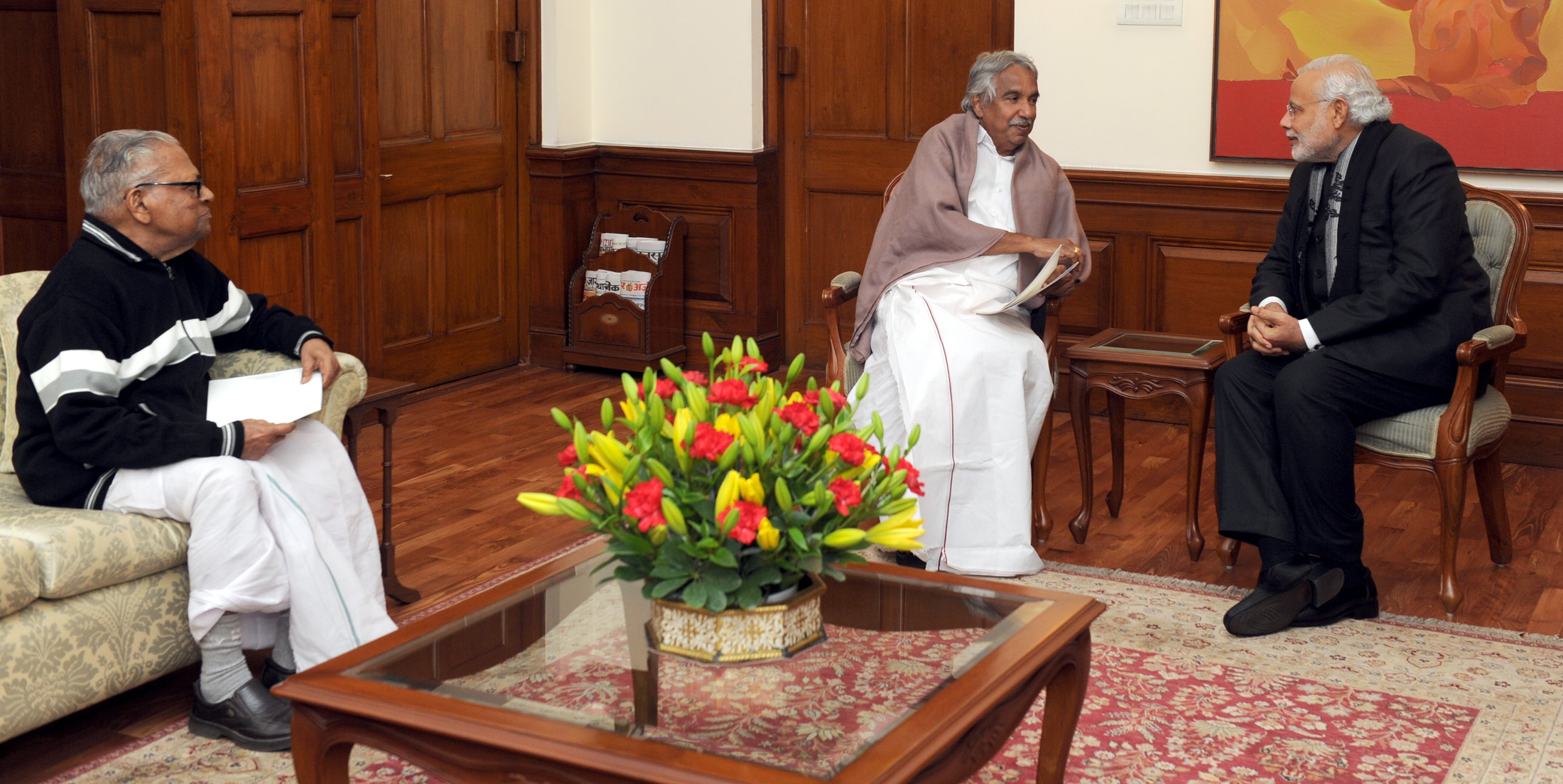
V. S. Achuthanandan with Oommen Chandy meeting Prime Minister Narendra Modi in 2015

Meanwhile, June 2014 brought an internal flashpoint. At a high-level CPI(M) meeting in Delhi on 8 June 2014, Achuthanandan publicly criticised the Kerala party leadership for its poor Lok Sabha performance. He harshly criticised then state secretary Pinarayi Vijayan and his team for failing to exploit the national anti-Congress wave, and demanded a change of state leadership after the UDF won 12 of 20 seats. He also reiterated that some party members accused in the 2012 murder of rebel leader T. P. Chandrasekharan still had not been expelled, calling the handling of that case unfair. Achuthanandan said these mistakes — including a public insult to Left ally N. K. Premachandran of the RSP — had humiliated the party. He concluded by declaring that “it is time there is an overhaul of the party in the state”. This unprecedented public critique further strained his relationship with the state leadership, and was noted by party observers as part of his long-standing feud with Pinarayi Vijayan.

In September 2014, acting on his role as opposition leader, Achuthanandan challenged a UDF government ordinance that raised taxes without legislative approval. He wrote to the Speaker to convene the Assembly, calling the tax hike “unconstitutional” since no Budget or ordinance had authorised it. He argued that imposing over ₹2,000 crore in new duties by executive order violated the public’s rights and demanded a debate on the government’s financial crisis. This incident exemplified his active use of Assembly procedures to check the ruling party.

=== Election and Administrative Reforms Commission (2016–2021) ===
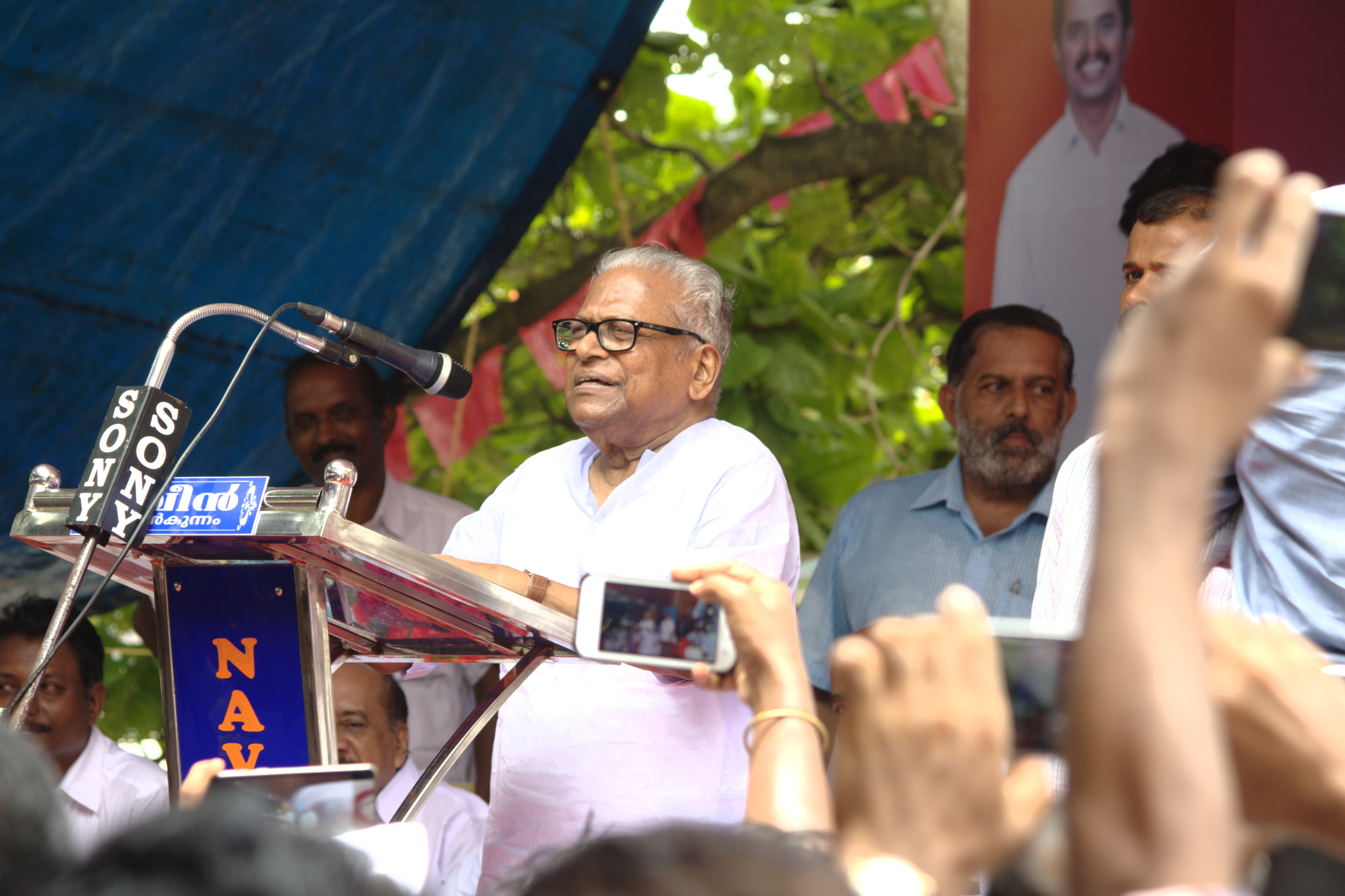
V. S. Achuthanandan during the 2016 election campaign

In 2016, at 92, Achuthanandan won again from Malampuzha. The election result prompted public acknowledgments of Achuthanandan’s stature. For example, Prime Minister Narendra Modi (leader of the BJP) phoned Achuthanandan – not Vijayan – to congratulate him on the Left’s victory, noting Achuthanandan’s key role in the campaign.

Achuthanandan formally handed over the Opposition Leader’s post to the new Assembly leader (Ramesh Chennithala) on 25 May 2016.

Instead of appointing him as the chief minister, he was appointed Chair of the Kerala Administrative Reforms Commission (ARC)—the state’s fourth—as decided by the state Cabinet on 3 August 2016. The position carried Cabinet rank, complete with a personal staff and facilities. The ARC, which examines administrative efficiency across multiple areas of governance, entrusted him to lead a comprehensive review of state mechanisms covering delegation of authority, civil service reform, anti-corruption, e-governance, and decentralisation.

During his tenure, the ARC submitted over 11 study reports, including its 12th report on budget and financial management, and the 14th report on performance evaluation across key departments. He tendered his formal resignation on 30 January 2021, citing health reasons, after nearly five years of steering initiatives aimed at transparency, accountability, and citizen-centred governance. This officially marked his retirement from active politics, concluding a decades-long public career.

== Personal life and death ==
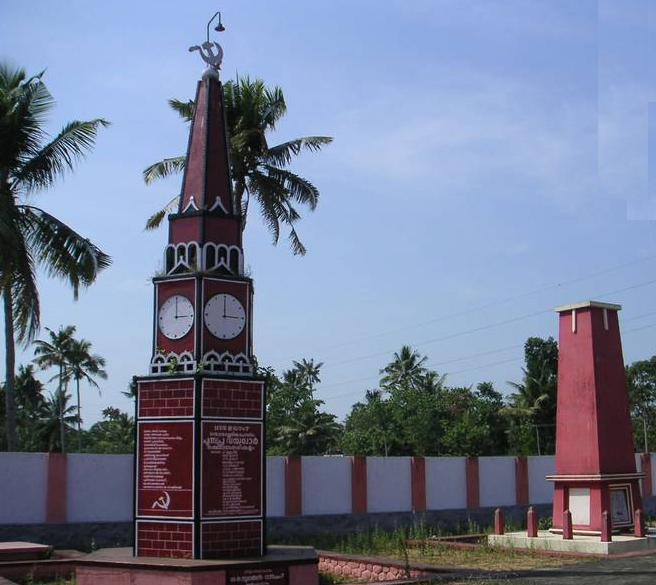
Achuthanandan's Final rites were conducted at Punnapra-Vayalar memorial in Alappuzha

Achuthanandan was married to K. Vasumathy at age 44, and the couple had two children: a daughter, V.V. Asha, and a son V. A. Arun Kumar. He also has five grandchildren.

On 20 October 2023, Achuthanandan turned 100, making him the first Chief Minister of Kerala to be so. This was despite multiple health issues like diabetes and hypertension. He always maintained a disciplined lifestyle, and was a keen practitioner of yoga till he was paralysed by a massive stroke in October 2019.

Achuthanandan died at Pattom SUT Hospital in Thiruvananthapuram, on 21 July 2025, after being treated there for nearly a month following a massive heart attack. He had been admitted to the ICU on 23 June, remaining in critical condition throughout his stay. He was 101 years old. Achuthanandan was cremated on 23 July with full state honours, at Valiyachudukad in Alappuzha, a historic cremation ground where many communist leaders and the martyrs of the Punnapra-Vayalar uprising are interred. His funeral procession drew thousands statewide and traced a route from Thiruvananthapuram to Alappuzha, delayed by massive public turnout. Thousands of people, including senior political figures from several parties, gathered despite rain and traffic diversions, in a display of cross‑ideological respect.

Prime Minister Narendra Modi expressed his condolences on X. Media coverage noted that Modi recalled their past interactions as former chief ministers and praised Achuthanandan’s dedication to public service.

== Public image ==
VS Achuthanandan was often referred to as the "Fidel Castro of Kerala" due to his long-standing association with communist ideologies and his public persona as a mass leader. In 2016, then CPI(M) general secretary Sitaram Yechury described him as symbolically important to the party, likening his role to that of Fidel Castro in Cuba. Achuthanandan had expressed deep admiration for Castro, citing him as a source of in spiration for rights-based activism and anti-imperialist resistance.

He was widely regarded as a "principled, grassroots Communist leader" with a reputation for "integrity and austerity". Contemporary reports describe him as a "staunch Marxist known for his rhetoric, anti-corruption stance, and commitment to social justice". He came from a working‐class background and maintained an ascetic lifestyle – for decades he was a vegetarian with a strict daily regimen – which reinforced his image as a leader of ordinary people. Colleagues and aides noted that even as he aged, Achuthanandan kept consistent routines (in food, sleep, exercise and study) and remained engaged with "social issues of farmers, workers and the poor".

Press and political commentary emphasize his wide public support and popularity. Newspapers have called him "one of Kerala’s most loved leaders," noting that public chants of slogans like "Kanne Karale VS-ey" (an affectionate tribute) greeted his rallies. His campaigns saw significant public turnout, and grassroots popularity is believed to have influenced the CPI(M)’s decision to project him as the party’s face in the 2006 and 2016 elections, despite internal resistance from sections of the leadership. Commentators have attributed his popularity to his long-standing involvement in land reform movements, environmental protection, and advocacy for marginalized communities. During his tenure as Chief Minister from 2006 to 2011, media reports noted that he emphasized maintaining public support in governance, which contributed to his image as a committed and principled leader within the Left movement.

He was also known for his austere lifestyle and was described by some commentators as "representing a form of moral authority that differed from traditional expressions of political power". Economist and former Planning Board vice‑chairman Prabhat Patnaik remarked that his political influence stemmed more from "personal integrity and public credibility than from organizational dominance". He described him as "rare beacon of moral authority". Social scientist M. Kunhaman also noted Achuthanandan’s discomfort with official privilege, interpreting it as a sign of his ideological consistency.

At the same time, media outlets highlighted his populist and anti-corruption credentials. Deccan Herald, for instance, described him as "one of the biggest crowd pullers of all time in Kerala" and noted that "his speeches were sharp and incisive against corruption and injustice", reinforcing his image as a grassroots leader.

His oratorical style became a distinctive part of his public persona. Journalists described the so-called "VS style" as folksy yet forceful: he often spoke in a colloquial manner, with exaggerated pauses and emphases to drive home points. This style – including on-the-spot jokes and witty nicknames for opponents (famously calling Rahul Gandhi an "Amul baby") – made his speeches memorable and appealed to ordinary listeners. Media accounts say that his trademark use of repetition and stress in speeches “endeared him to the masses and the cadre within the party,” earning both respect and a touch of humour from the audience. Even late in life, Achuthanandan frequently held lively public meetings, and news coverage often highlighted the energy and plain-speaking tone of his campaign rallies.

Within the CPI(M) and among political insiders, Achuthanandan was known as a fiercely independent and sometimes divisive figure. He was never reluctant to publicly "speak his mind" even when it broke with party directives. In the 2000s this led to well-known factional feuds, especially with then Kerala state secretary Pinarayi Vijayan. In 2007 both leaders were briefly suspended from the party Politburo for publicly criticising each other, and Achuthanandan was not immediately reinstated, underscoring his reputation as a maverick. Some party colleagues described him in earlier years as "abrasive, uncompromising and often ruthless," tolerating no dissent from subordinates. Yet by the 2010s he was also viewed by many as a corrective force: an outsider-turned-reformer whose principled stands (against corruption or perceived "rightward" shifts) made him a popular conscience-keeper. He himself warned that the CPI(M) was "moving away from its communist roots," causing tension with leaders he felt were compromising on ideology.

He was also critical of what he perceived as complacency or deviation within leftist movements. During his tenure as chief minister, he implicitly responded to intra-party criticisms by invoking historical examples like the dissolution of the Soviet Union, warning that revolutionary movements must guard against internal decay.

As chief minister, Achuthanandan raised concerns about central government policies, including opposition to a proposed Free Trade Agreement that he believed would adversely affect Kerala’s edible oil producers. This was consistent with his political stance in defending the interests of vulnerable sections of society.

Overall, public and media perceptions of Achuthanandan were generally positive but overwhelmingly centered on his personal integrity and simplicity. He was widely praised as a relentless fighter for the poor and an incorruptible veteran; upon his death he was hailed in tributes as a “true communist” and “voice of the voiceless”. At the same time, critics noted that his forthright manner could be abrasive and that he could be guilty of his own contradictions. For example, a Hindustan Times report observed scrutiny of his secret ties with solar-power lobbyists during a government corruption case. Commentators also remarked that his combative style and use of loyal media networks sometimes made him a polarising figure. Nevertheless, commentators generally agree that his enduring public image was shaped by his ideological consistency, austere lifestyle, and a distinctive oratorical style that blended colloquial simplicity with forceful rhetoric.

== In popular culture ==
- Thilakan portrayed the role of chief minister, which was closely modelled on V. S. Achuthanandan, in the film Aayudham (2008).
- In the film I. G. – Inspector General, Rajan P. Dev portrayed the role of the CM which was closely modelled on V. S. Achuthanandan.
- In the Malayalam film August 15, the character of Chief Minister of Kerala, played by actor Nedumudi Venu was inspired by the political life of V. S. Achuthanandan.
- In 2016, V.S. Achuthanandan had made his debut appearance in the silver screen in Malayalam Movie Campus Diary. In the movie, V.S is waging a war against a corporate firm that exploits water resources of the Kalikkadavu village. The cast included leading stars like Kerala State Best Actor Award winner Sudev Nair, Gautami, Joy Mathew etc.

== Awards ==
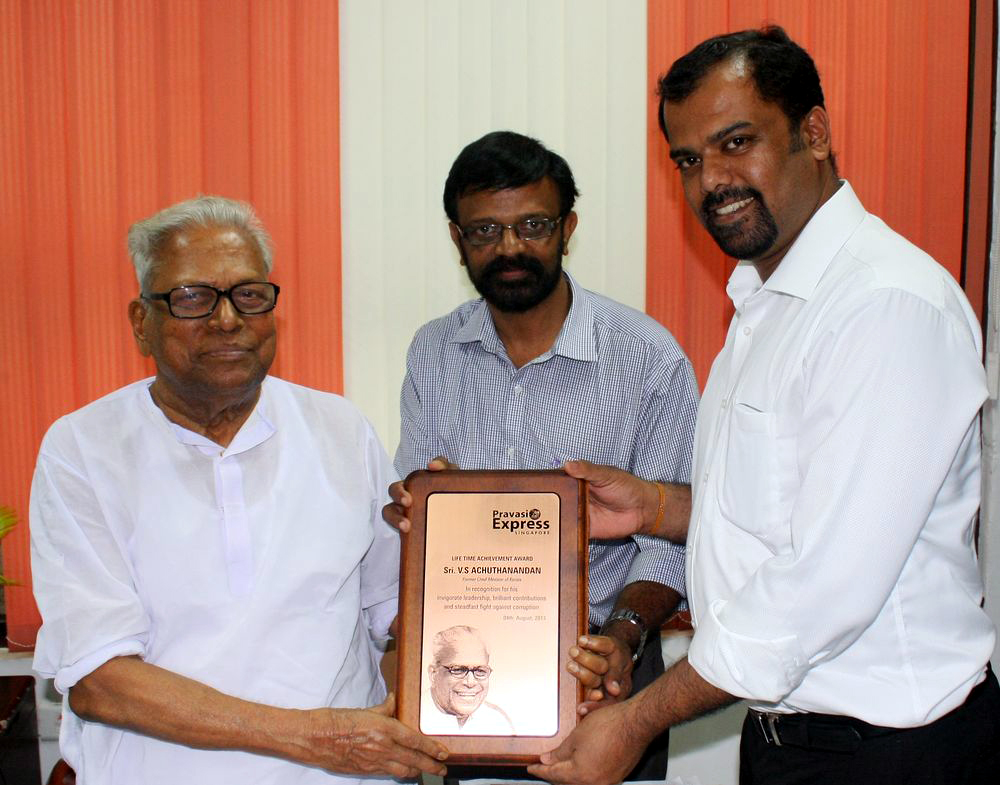
VS receiving Pravasi Express Awards

- Padma Vibhushan, India's 2nd Highest Civilian Award, 2026
- Pravasi Express Awards Lifetime Achievement Award 2013
- Ali Hassan Memorial Samskarika Samithi Award.
- Velu Thampi Memorial National Award
- S Sivasankara Pillai memorial Award
- Manorama news – News Maker of the year Award (2006)
- NC Sekhar Award
- The first Kerala Award instituted by Kerala State Karshaka Thozhilali Union

== Books ==
- Samaram Thanne Jeevitham (സമരം തന്നെ ജീവിതം)
- Kerala Vikasana Sankalpangal
- Samarathinu Idavelakalilla
- Idapedalukalkku Avasanamilla
- Ayyankali Muthal Pashimagatam Vare (അയ്യങ്കാളി മുതല്‍ പശ്ചിമഘട്ടംവരെ)
- Janapaksham (ജനപക്ഷം)
- Paristhithiyum Vikasanavum (പരിസ്ഥിതിയും വികസനവും)
- Irakal Vettayadappedumbol

== See also ==
- List of chief ministers of Kerala

Preceded by Oommen Chandy	Chief Minister of Kerala; 2006–2011	Succeeded by Oommen Chandy
