= Pinarayi Vijayan =

Indian politician (born 1945)

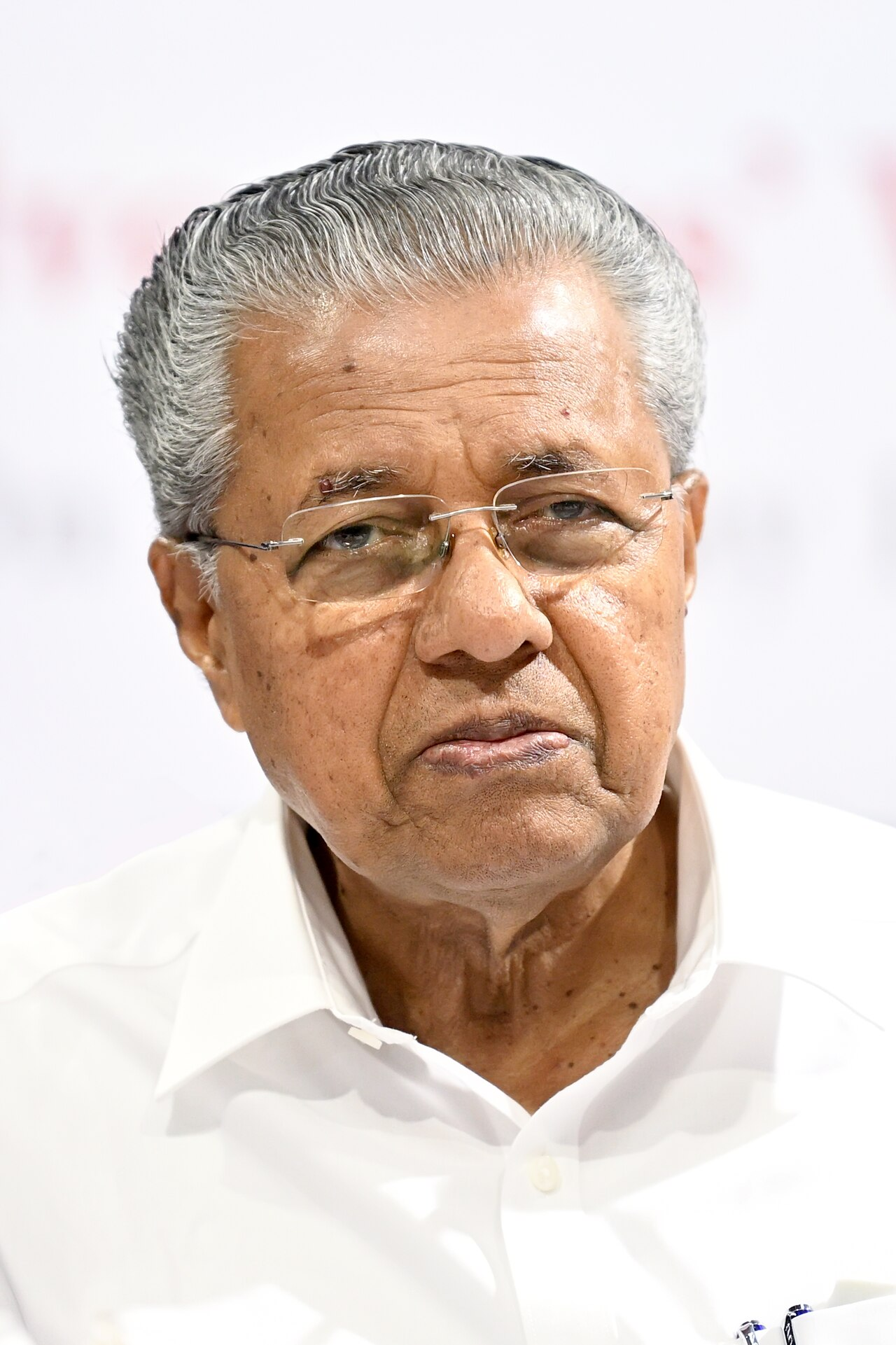
- Vijayan in 2023

12th Leader of the Opposition in the Kerala Legislative Assembly
- Incumbent
- Assumed office 18 May 2026
- Governor: Rajendra Arlekar
- Chief Minister: V. D. Satheesan
- Preceded by: V. D. Satheesan

12th Chief Minister of Kerala
- In office 25 May 2016 – 18 May 2026
- Governor: P. Sathasivam; Arif Mohammad Khan; Rajendra Arlekar
- Preceded by: Oommen Chandy
- Succeeded by: V. D. Satheesan
Departments under Chief Minister
In office 25 May 2016 – 4 May 2026
Ministry and Departments	Administration of Civil and Criminal Justice; Airports; All India Services; Coastal Shipping and Inland Navigation (Construction of waterways); Disaster Management; Distress Relief; Election; Environment; Fire and Rescue Services; General Administration; Home; Information and Public Relations; Information Technology; Integration; Inter - State River Waters - Kaveri, Nila and Periyar Tribunals; Kerala Shipping and Inland Navigation Corporation; Metro Rail; Non- Resident Keralites’ Affairs; Personnel and Administrative Reforms; Planning and Economic Affairs; Pollution Control; Printing and Stationery; Prisons; Sainik Welfare; Scientific Institutes; Science and Technology; State Hospitality; Vigilance; All important policy matters; Subjects not mentioned elsewhere
Preceded by	Oommen Chandy (Chief minister); Ramesh Chennithala (Home & Vigilance); P.K. Kunhalikkutty (Information Technology); Thiruvanchoor Radhakrishnan (Environment)
Succeeded by	V. D. Satheesan (Chief minister); Ramesh Chennithala (Home & Vigilance); P. K. Kunhalikutty (Electronics and Information Technology)

Member of Kerala Legislative Assembly
- Incumbent
- Assumed office 2 June 2016
- Preceded by: K. K. Narayanan
- Constituency: Dharmadom
- In office 10 May 1996 – 14 May 2001
- Preceded by: C. P. Narayanan
- Succeeded by: P. K. Sreemathi
- Constituency: Payyanur
- In office 19 June 1991 – 9 May 1996
- Preceded by: K. P. Mammoo Master
- Succeeded by: K. K. Shailaja
- Constituency: Kuthuparamba
- In office 1970–1979
- Preceded by: K. K. Abee
- Succeeded by: N. V. Raghavan
- Constituency: Kuthuparamba

Kerala Minister for Electricity
- In office 20 May 1996 – 19 October 1998
- Chief Minister: E. K. Nayanar
- Preceded by: G. Karthikeyan
- Succeeded by: S. Sharma

Kerala Minister of Co-operatives
- In office 20 May 1996 – 19 October 1998
- Chief Minister: E. K. Nayanar
- Preceded by: M. V. Raghavan
- Succeeded by: S. Sharma

Member of the Politburo of the Communist Party of India (Marxist)
- Incumbent
- Assumed office 24 March 2002

Secretary of the Communist Party of India (Marxist), Kerala State Committee
- In office 25 September 1998 – 23 February 2015
- Preceded by: Chadayan Govindan
- Succeeded by: Kodiyeri Balakrishnan

Personal details
- Born: 24 May 1945 (age 81) Pinarayi, Madras Province, British India
- Party: Communist Party of India (Marxist)
- Spouse: T. Kamala (m. 1979)
- Children: 2
- Relatives: P. A. Mohammed Riyas (son-in-law)
- Education: Government Brennen College (B.A.)
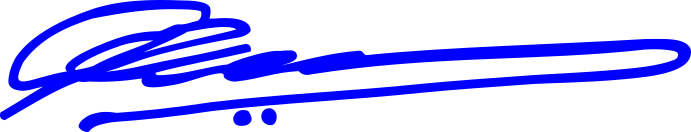
- Signature
- Website: pinarayivijayan.in

Pinarayi Vijayan (Malayalam: [piɳɐraːji ʋid͡ʒɐjɐn]; born 24 May 1945) is an Indian politician who served as the 12th Chief Minister of Kerala from 25 May 2016 to 18 May 2026. He is the current Leader of the Opposition in the Kerala Legislative Assembly.

A member of the Politburo of the Communist Party of India (Marxist) (CPI(M)), he is the longest-serving secretary of the Kerala State Committee of the CPI(M) (1998–2015). He has also served as Minister of Electric Power and Co-operatives during the third E. K. Nayanar ministry. Vijayan won a seat in the May 2016 Kerala Legislative Assembly election and 2021 Kerala Legislative Assembly election as the CPI(M) candidate for Dharmadom constituency and was selected as the leader of the Left Democratic Front (LDF) and became the 12th Chief Minister of Kerala.

He is the first chief minister from Kerala to be re-elected after completing a full term (five years) in office. In 2022, he also became the longest-continuous serving chief minister of Kerala, surpassing C. Achutha Menon who had been the first to remain in office for 2364 consecutive days.

== Early and personal life ==
Vijayan was born on 24 May 1945 in Pinarayi, Kannur into a Thiyyar family, the largest Hindu community in Kerala, as the youngest son of Maroli Koran and Alakkatt Kalyani. He had 14 siblings of whom only three survived. After graduating from school, he worked as a handloom weaver for a year before joining a pre-university course at Government Brennen College, Thalassery. Subsequently, he earned B.A. Economics degree from the same college.

His wife, Kamala Vijayan, is a retired teacher. They have two children, daughter Veena Vijayan who is married to P. A. Mohammed Riyas, and son Vivek Kiran Vijayan.

== Political career ==
=== Early political career (1964–1970) ===
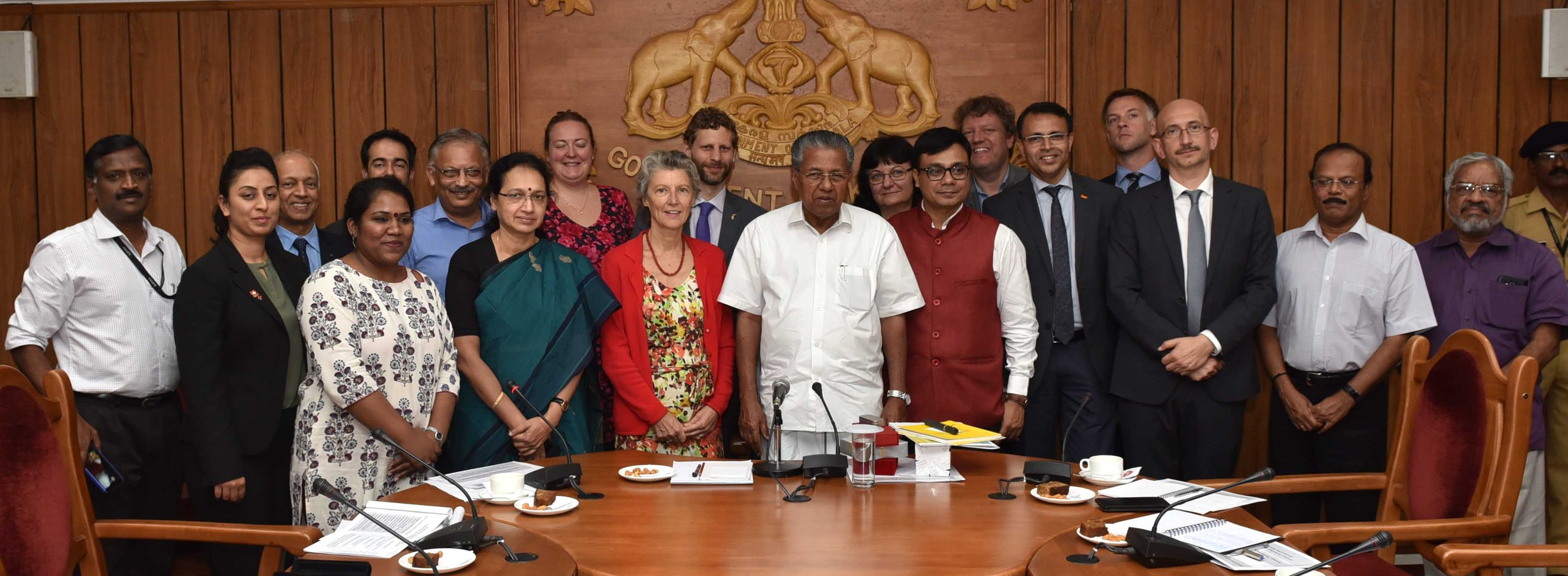
Chief Minister Pinarayi Vijayan with a team of delegates from European Union Research and Innovation, 15 November 2017

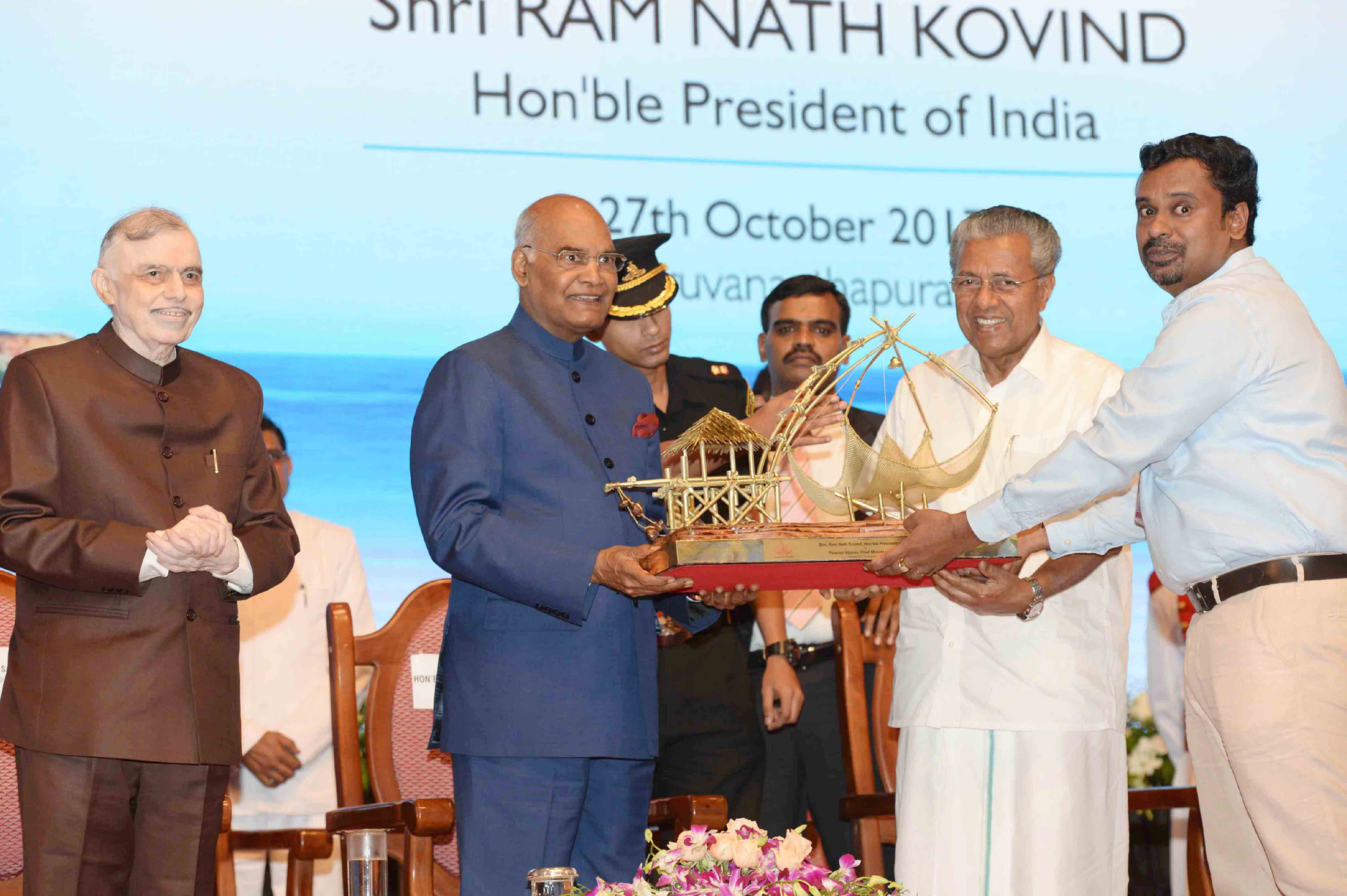
The President, Shri Ram Nath Kovind at the civic reception, at Thiruvanthapuram, in Kerala

Pinarayi Vijayan entered politics through student union activities at Government Brennen College, Thalassery. He eventually joined the Communist Party of India (Marxist) in 1964. Vijayan became Kannur district secretary of the Kerala Students Federation (KSF), which later became the Students Federation of India (SFI). He went on to become the state secretary and subsequently the state president of KSF. He then moved on to Kerala State Youth Federation (KSYF), which later became the Democratic Youth Federation of India (DYFI). He became the president of the state committee. During that period, when communists in Kerala were organising the political activities from different hide-outs, Pinarayi Vijayan was imprisoned for one and a half years. Later, he was elected as the president of the Kerala state co-operative bank. He became the Kannur district secretary of the CPI(M) when M.V. Raghavan left the party over the 'alternative document' row.

He was one among the accused in Kerala's first political murder case, of that of Vadikkal Ramakrishnan, who was killed by an axe on 28 April 1969. Though the court acquitted all the accused due to lack of evidence, this has been used by various political opponents to portray the violent nature of CPI(M) - RSS conflicts in Kannur, which has taken more than 200 lives of supporters from both factions.

=== Kerala Assembly (1970–present) ===
At the age of 25, in 1970 assembly election Vijayan contested from Kuthuparamba and won the seat making him Kerala's youngest legislator, a record still unbroken. He was elected to the Assembly in 1970, 1977 and 1991 from Kuthuparamba, in 1996 from Payyanur and in 2016, 2021 from Dharmadom.

=== During Emergency (1975) ===
During the emergency rule, when communists in Kerala were organising political activities from different hideouts, many CPI(M) members and leaders, including Pinarayi Vijayan, were imprisoned for one and a half years. He was arrested and tortured by police. After his release, Pinarayi Vijayan reached the Kerala Legislative Assembly and made an impassionate speech against senior Congress leader K. Karunakaran holding up the blood-stained shirt he wore when in police custody, causing serious embarrassment to the then C. Achutha Menon government.

=== Minister of Electricity and SNC-Lavalin scandal (1996–1998) ===
In the 1996 assembly election, E. K. Nayanar led LDF won the election and Vijayan was appointed Minister of Electricity.

The SNC Lavalin controversy in Kerala was a major allegation that rocked Kerala politics. The Comptroller and Auditor General of India report had stated that the deal Vijayan had struck as electricity minister in 1998 with Lavalin, a Canadian firm, for the repair of three generators, had cost the state exchequer a staggering Rs 375 crores. On 16 January 2007, Kerala High Court ordered a CBI enquiry into the SNC Lavalin case. There are also reports that the CAG did not report any losses to state exchequer, but that the project did not yield commensurate gains. Pinarayi Vijayan had been named as the 9th accused in the case by CBI. The CPM led Kerala Government decided not to let Vijayan be prosecuted in the case. Over-ruling the cabinet recommendation, the Governor allowed CBI to prosecute Vijayan. Though CPI(M) called Governor's move un-constitutional, then Kerala Chief Minister V.S. Achuthanandan said there is nothing surprising or wrong in Governor's decision. On 5 November 2013, the CBI special court discharged Pinarayi Vijayan and the others accused from the list of accused in the SNC-Lavalin Case. The court has allowed a plea made by Pinarayi Vijayan asking his name to be removed from the list of accused in the case. The court held that there isn't any proof of dishonest and fraudulent intentions, abuse of official position and cheating.

=== State Secretary of CPIM (Kerala) (1998–2016) ===
In 1998, he became the state secretary of the CPI(M), following the death of the incumbent Chadayan Govindan. He was elected to the Politburo of the CPI(M) in 2002. After resigning the post as the Minister of Electricity in 1998, Vijayan assumed the position of state secretary of the CPI(M) for 18 years. Despite the party's declining popularity in West Bengal, Tripura and other regions in India, his leadership of the CPI(M) in Kerala saw the strengthening of the party's base of support in the state. He led the party to a landslide victory in the 2004 Indian general election, 2006 Kerala assembly election, 2014 Indian general election and 2016 Kerala assembly election. On 16 February 2007 the airport security in Chennai Airport recovered five bullets from Vijayan's baggage. The Chennai airport security released Vijayan after receiving a faxed copy of his license.

On 26 May 2007 the CPI(M) suspended Vijayan and V. S. Achuthanandan from the Politburo for their public remarks about each other. Vijayan was later reinstated into the Politburo.

=== Positions held ===
- 1964 - Member, CPIM Kerala
- 1965 - District secretary, Kerala Student's Federation (KSF), Kannur
- 1966 - State President, Kerala Student's Federation (KSF), Kerala
- 1968 - District secretary, Kerala State Youth Federation (KSYF), Kannur
- 1969 - State President, Kerala State Youth Federation (KSYF), Kerala
- 1970 - MLA Kuthuparamba (Term 1)
- 1971 - President, Kerala State Co-operative Bank
- 1972 - District Secretary, CPIM, Kannur
- 1977 - MLA Kuthuparamba (Term 2)
- 1978 - State committee member, CPIM Kerala
- 1988 - State secretariat member, CPIM Kerala
- 1991 - MLA Kuthuparamba (Term 3)
- 1996 - Minister of Electricity, Kerala State.
- 1996 - MLA Payyanur (Term 4)
- 1998 - State secretary, CPIM Kerala
- 2002 - Member, Politburo of the CPIM
- 2016 - Chief Minister of Kerala (Term 1)
- 2016 - MLA Dharmadam (Term V)
- 2021 - Chief Minister of Kerala (Term 2)
- 2021 - MLA Dharmadam (Term VI)

==== Electoral performance in Kerala Assembly ====
Year	Constituency	Party	Votes	%	Opponent		Votes	%	Result	Margin	Margin in %
1970	Kuthuparamba	CPI(M)	28,281	46.72	PSP	Thayath Raghavan	27,538	45.49	Won	743	1.23
1977	Kuthuparamba	CPI(M)	34,465	52.60	RSP	Abdulkadar	30,064	45.89	Won	4,401	6.71
1991	Kuthuparamba	CPI(M)	58,842	53.43	INC	P. Ramakrishnan	45,782	41.57	Won	13,960	11.86
1996	Payyannur	CPI(M)	70,870	59.42	INC	K. N. Kannoth	42,792	35.88	Won	28,078	23.54
2016	Dharmadam	CPI(M)	87,329	56.84	INC	Mambaram Divakaran	50,424	32.82	Won	36,905	24.02
2021	Dharmadam	CPI(M)	95,522	59.61	INC	C. Raghunathan	45,399	28.33	Won	50,123	31.16
2026	Dharmadam	CPI(M)	85,614	49.87	INC	Adv. V.P Abdul Rasheed	66,367	38.66	Won	19,247	11.21

== First term as chief minister of Kerala (2016-2021) ==
Following the 2016 Legislative Assembly election, Pinarayi Vijayan became the Chief Minister of Kerala. The swearing-in ceremony of his Left Democratic Front ministry with 19-member cabinet was held on 25 May 2016. Vijayan held the charge of Home Affairs & Vigilance Departments along with the other portfolios normally held by the Chief Ministers. He was elected from Dharmadom constituency.

During the severe 2018 Kerala floods—the worst in a century—Chief Minister Pinarayi Vijayan took an active leadership role in coordinating rescue and relief efforts. On 14 August 2018, he led an aerial survey of affected regions and thanked the Central government, Prime Minister Narendra Modi, and opposition parties for their "constructive roles". He called upon employees to donate wages to the Chief Minister's Distress Relief Fund and asked banks to waive transfer charges, as part of state‑level relief initiatives.

He also addressed concerns over misinformation, warning that those spreading fake news about the relief operations would face action. He visited multiple flood-affected districts—including Idukki, Wayanad, Kannur, and Ernakulam—to directly assess conditions and address grievances from victims in relief camps.

Journalists and analysts credited him with restoring public confidence, often citing his no‑nonsense manner and timely press briefings as key to rallying relief efforts and sustaining morale during the crisis. Nevertheless, the Government was accused of misappropriating a large amount from the Chief Minister's Distress Relief Fund which was collected during the floods.

In 2020, Vijayan faced heat from various opposition parties after several members of the chief minister's office were accused in the 2020 Kerala gold smuggling case. The suspended principal secretary of IT department Mr. M. Shivasankar was arrested in connection with the investigation of the Gold smuggling case.

== Second term as chief minister of Kerala (2021-2026) ==
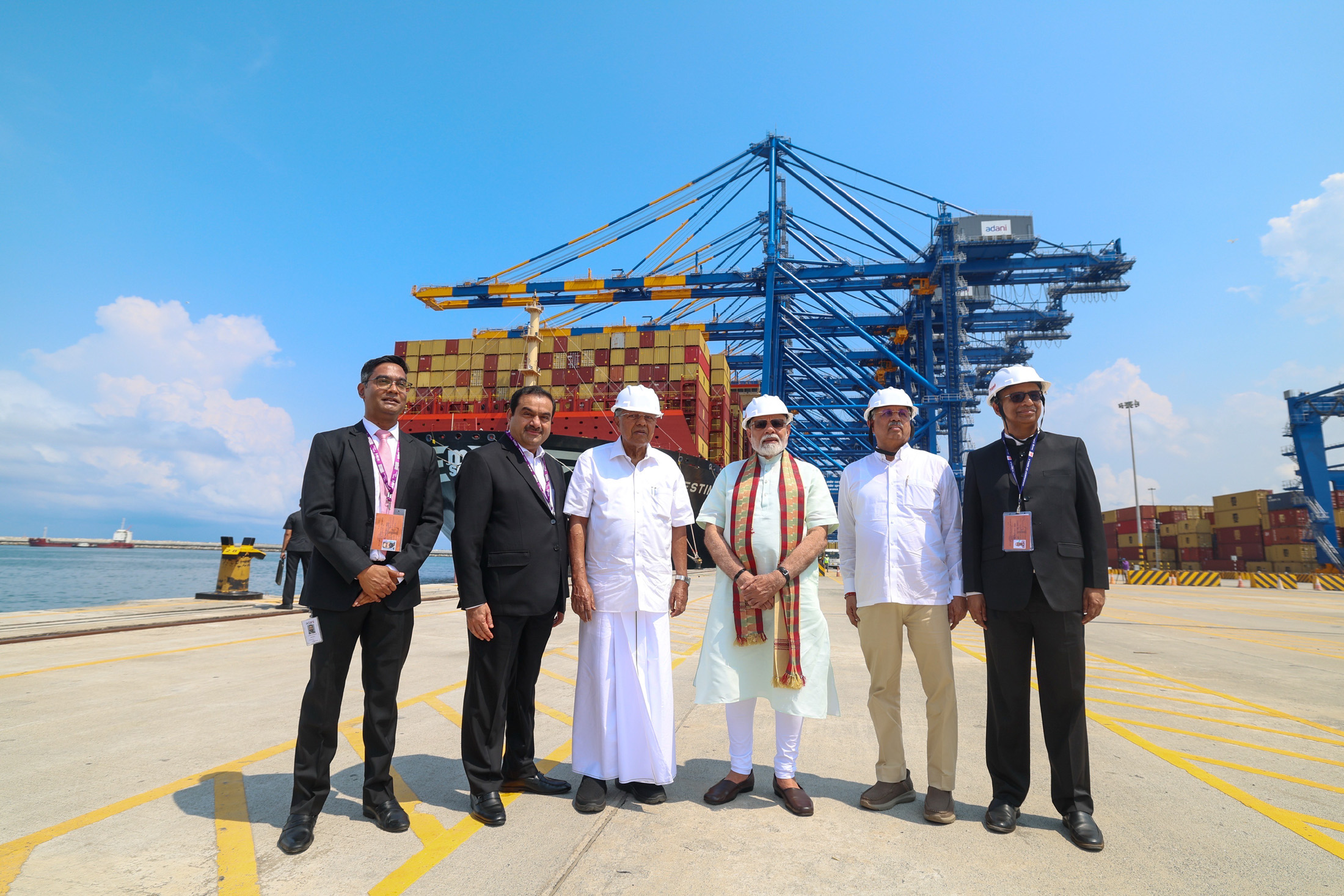
Vijayan during inauguration of Vizhinjam International Seaport Thiruvananthapuram in 2025

The 2021 election of Kerala saw the incumbent government of Vijayan led Left Democratic Front (LDF) retained to power with 99 seats, 8 more than in the previous election, marking the first time that an alliance won consecutive terms in the state since its 1977 election. Pinarayi Vijayan also became the only Chief minister of Kerala to get re-elected after completing full five-year term in the office. The Council assumed office on 20 May 2021. The ministry had a total of 21 ministers in the Cabinet as compared to 20 ministers in the previous government. In November 2022, Vijayan became the longest continuous serving chief minister of Kerala.

In his second term as Chief Minister from May 2021, Pinarayi Vijayan retained key departments including Home, Vigilance, and General Administration. He also held charge of departments such as Planning and Economic Affairs, Information Technology, Personnel and Administrative Reforms, Science and Technology, Non-Resident Keralites’ Affairs, and several others related to internal security, infrastructure, and public administration.

During his second term beginning in May 2021, Vijayan led several major initiatives and responses spanning governance, economy, and social welfare:

=== Digital Governance & Infrastructure ===
Kerala was declared India’s first fully e‑governed state, with over 900 services online via portals like e‑Sevanam and the Kerala Fibre Optic Network (K‑FON), which aims to provide free or low‑cost internet to households, especially those below the poverty line.

=== Economic & Enterprise Promotion ===
He launched the Year of Enterprises campaign (2022–23), designed to incubate and scale micro, small and medium enterprises (MSMEs). It resulted in over 1.39 lakh new ventures and more than 3 lakh jobs in the first year, with further growth projected.

=== Public Outreach & Development Messaging ===
In late 2023, he led Nava Kerala Sadas, a statewide outreach tour across all Assembly constituencies to communicate development achievements and gather public feedback ahead of upcoming elections.

He inaugurated Keraleeyam Festival in November 2023, showcasing Kerala’s cultural heritage and asserting the state’s identity as a knowledge-based and inclusive economy.

=== Exalogic–CMRL Controversy: Vijayan’s Involvement ===
In September 2023, he described allegations involving payments from Cochin Minerals and Rutile Ltd (CMRL) to his daughter’s company, Exalogic Solutions, as a "political witch‑hunt". He asserted the transactions were lawful and based on contracts, criticizing opposition claims and media reports as politically motivated.

In April 2025, responding to SFIO allegations that his daughter had received ₹2.7 crore from CMRL without providing proper service, Vijayan publicly rejected calls for his resignation. He stated he did not take the charges seriously and accused central investigative agencies of political targeting.

Between 2025 June 10–17, he filed a counter‑affidavit in Kerala High Court opposing a PIL that sought a CBI probe. He clarified he had no involvement in Exalogic’s business dealings, denied any illegal gratification, and called the petition legally unfounded. The court adjourned the hearing to 2 July 2025, noting pending service of notice to key respondents.

In April 2025, During a press briefing, he addressed the media harshly over their coverage of the controversy, stating: “You want my blood, but it won’t be that easy.” He reiterated that the SFIO probe was ongoing and emphasized the transparency of his daughter’s company’s financial transactions.

=== Social Welfare & Governance ===
He announced an ambitious goal to eradicate extreme poverty in Kerala by November 2025, targeting a 93% reduction by end-2024.

During an anti‑drug campaign kickoff in May 2025, he emphasized a rehabilitative approach to addiction, promoting counseling over punishment. He also criticized the central government’s perceived failure to support Kerala during crises and highlighted achievements in education, health, and poverty reduction.

=== Malappuram PR controversy over gold‑smuggling remarks ===
In a September 2024 interview published by The Hindu, Vijayan was quoted stating that approximately ₹123 crore in hawala money and 150 kg of smuggled gold were seized in Malappuram district and were entering Kerala to support “anti‑State” or “anti‑national activities”. This triggered protests from Muslim organizations and criticism from opposition parties. However, The Hindu later issued a correction indicating that portions of the interview were added at the request of a PR agency, and Vijayan’s press secretary stated the remarks were misattributed.

=== Nilambur Assembly by‑election 2025 ===
In June 2025, a by‑election was held in the Nilambur Assembly constituency, caused by the resignation of MLA P. V. Anvar in January 2025. The UDF candidate Aryadan Shoukath won with a margin of approximately 11,077 votes, securing over 77,000 votes, while LDF candidate M. Swaraj received around 66,000 votes. Independent Anvar trailed third with nearly 19,700 votes. The defeat marked the first loss of a sitting LDF seat during the Vijayan ministry and was widely interpreted as a significant expression of anti‑incumbency sentiment against his government.

Analysts and political commentators assessed the by-election loss as a symbolic blow to the Vijayan-led LDF. The Times of India reported that opposition leaders accused the government of communal polarization and poor campaign messaging, reflecting fears of alienation among minority voters.

=== Disaster policy advocacy ===
In July 2025, after devastating landslides and floods in Wayanad, he urged Prime Minister Modi to restore Section 13 of the Disaster Management Act, which facilitated financial relief for disaster victims. He argued that its removal in March 2025 had hindered Kerala’s recovery and accused the Centre of retroactive impairment of relief efforts.

=== Criticism of Central Government ===
In mid‑2025, he denounced the BJP‑led central government over the state textbook revision policy, claiming it was an ideological move to saffronize education and distort history. He reaffirmed Kerala’s autonomy by restoring deleted chapters and accused the central government of adopting retaliatory measures as a result.

=== Allegations by P. V. Anvar (independent MLA, Nilambur) ===
In 2024, P. V. Anvar alleged that senior police officials—including ADGP M. R. Ajith Kumar—had conducted illegal phone interceptions under orders. In September, then Governor Arif Mohammed Khan sought a report from Vijayan’s office regarding the claims. He later defended the legal use of call‑interception protocols, denying misuse in a letter, citing a police investigation.

=== Failure to act on phone‑tapping allegations ===
In June 2025, Kerala High Court reprimanded the state government for failing to register an FIR against Anvar, who had alleged phone‑tapping of senior officials by political aides. The court criticized procedural apathy while emphasizing state responsibility to act.

=== Investment & Economic outreach ===
He inaugurated the Invest Kerala Global Summit 2025 in Kochi, attracting investment proposals worth approximately ₹1.53 lakh crore and creating mechanisms for fast-track project approvals and investor engagement. He also advocated partnerships in tourism investments and technology sectors to transform Kerala’s economy.

=== Sanatana Dharma row ===
In December 2024, Vijayan was part of a political controversy after saying that Sree Narayana Guru was not a practitioner of Sanatana Dharma. His remark drew criticism from BJP leaders, who accused him of disparaging Hinduism and Sree Narayana Guru, while Congress leader V. D. Satheesan also criticised Vijayan's interpretation of Santana Dharma, while CPI(M) leader Thomas Issac defended Vijayan.

== Awards and honours ==
- Pinarayi Vijayan was awarded Gandhidarsan award for the best chief minister in 2018.
- The Institute of Human Virology honoured Pinarayi Vijayan for effective control of 2018 Nipah virus outbreak in Kerala in Baltimore, United States. Noted bio-medical scientist and co-founder of the institute Robert Gallo presented awards to the Chief Minister and the Health Minister of Kerala.

== Notes ==
Political offices
Preceded by Oommen Chandy	Chief Minister of Kerala; 25 May 2016 – 17 May 2026	Succeeded by V. D. Satheesan
