= Malampuzha Assembly constituency =

Constituency of the Kerala legislative assembly in India

Coordinates: 10.88°N 76.68°E

Malampuzha
- Constituency No. 55 for the Kerala Legislative Assembly
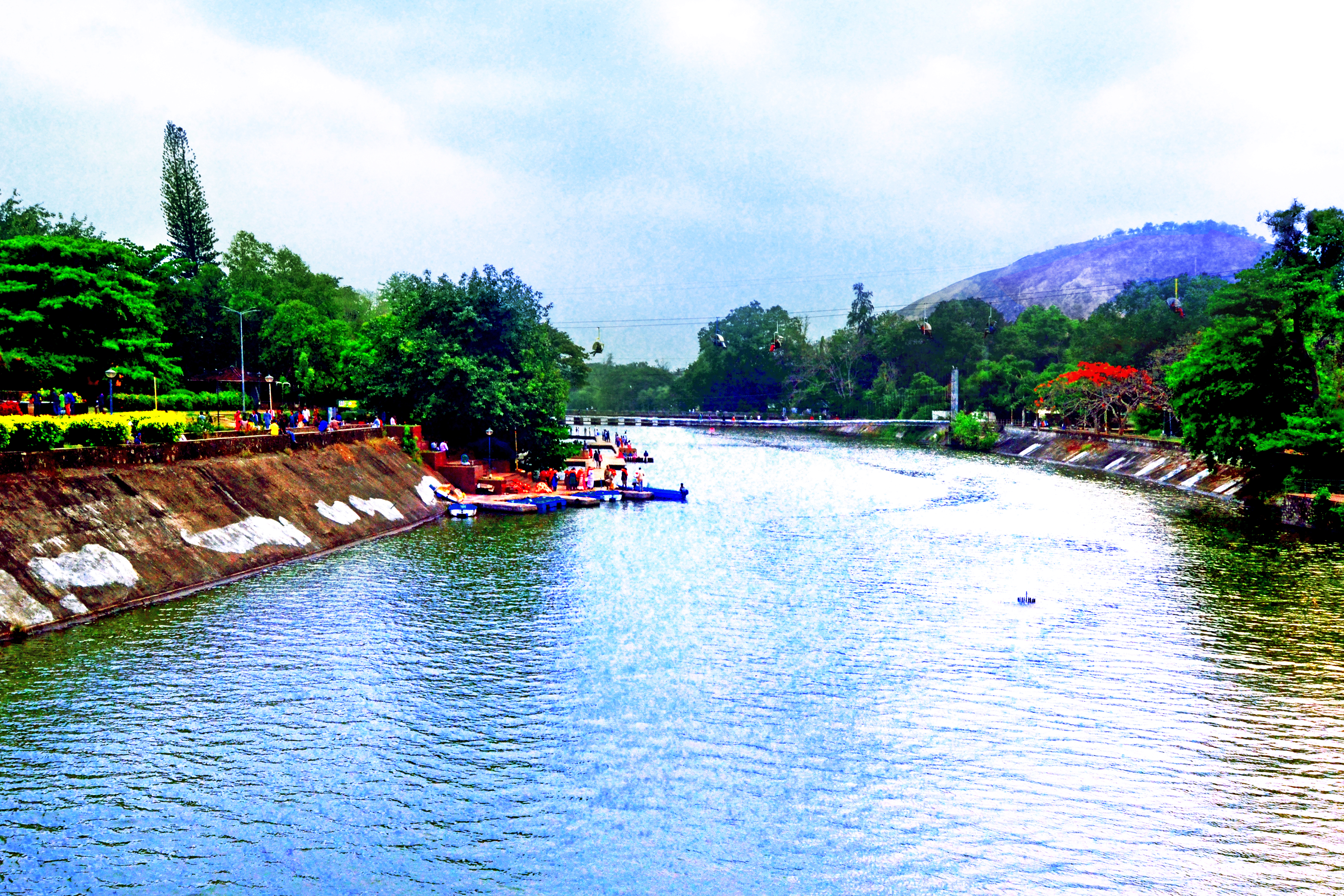
- Malampuzha Dam, the largest dam and reservoir in Kerala

Constituency details
- Country: India
- Region: South India
- State: Kerala
- District: Palakkad
- Established: 1965
- Total electors: 2,13,231 (2021)
- Reservation: None

Member of Legislative Assembly
- 16th Kerala Legislative Assembly
- Incumbent A. Prabhakaran
- Party: CPI(M)
- Alliance: LDF
- Elected year: 2026

Malampuzha State assembly constituency is one of the 140 state legislative assembly constituencies in Kerala. It is also one of the seven state legislative assembly constituencies included in Palakkad Lok Sabha constituency. As of the 2026 Assembly elections, the current MLA is A. Prabhakaran of CPI(M).

== Local self-governed segments ==
Malampuzha Assembly constituency is composed of the following local self-governed segments:

Sl no.	Name	Status (grama panchayat/municipality)	Taluk
1	Akathethara	Grama panchayat	Palakkad
2	Elappully	Grama panchayat	Palakkad
3	Kodumba	Grama panchayat	Palakkad
4	Malampuzha	Grama panchayat	Palakkad
5	Marutharode	Grama panchayat	Palakkad
6	Mundur	Grama panchayat	Palakkad
7	Puthupariyaram	Grama panchayat	Palakkad
8	Pudussery	Grama panchayat	Palakkad

== Members of Legislative Assembly ==
The following list contains all members of Kerala Legislative Assembly who have represented Malampuzha Assembly constituency during the period of various assemblies:

A. Prabhakaran retains seat in 2026 again to continue the tradition of CPI(M) being the only party to ever win a seat here.

Year	Member	Political party
1967	M. P. Kunhiraman	Communist Party of India (Marxist)
1969 (Note: By-Election)	V. Krishna Das	Communist Party of India (Marxist)
1970	V. Krishna Das	Communist Party of India (Marxist)
1977	P. V. Kunhikannan	Communist Party of India (Marxist)
1980	E. K. Nayanar	Communist Party of India (Marxist)
1982	E. K. Nayanar	Communist Party of India (Marxist)
1987	T. Sivadasa Menon	Communist Party of India (Marxist)
1991	T. Sivadasa Menon	Communist Party of India (Marxist)
1996	T. Sivadasa Menon	Communist Party of India (Marxist)
2001	V. S. Achuthanandan	Communist Party of India (Marxist)
2006	V. S. Achuthanandan	Communist Party of India (Marxist)
2011	V. S. Achuthanandan	Communist Party of India (Marxist)
2016	V. S. Achuthanandan	Communist Party of India (Marxist)
2021	A. Prabhakaran	Communist Party of India (Marxist)
2026	A. Prabhakaran	Communist Party of India (Marxist)

== Election results ==
=== 2026 ===
2026 Kerala Legislative Assembly election: Malampuzha
Party	Candidate	Votes	%	±%
CPI(M)	A. Prabhakaran	68,629	42.28	▼4.13
BJP	C. Krishnakumar	48,908	30.13	▼0.55
INC	A. Suresh	42,262	26.04	▲4.38
BSP	Ramnath C.	448	0.28	
SUCI(C)	K. Prasad	355	0.22	
AAP	Saji P. J.	197	0.12	
NOTA	None of the above	1,506	0.93	▲0.29
Margin of victory		19,721	12.15	▼3.57
Turnout		1,60,799	82.30	
CPI(M) hold		Swing	▼4.13	

=== 2021 ===
2021 Kerala Legislative Assembly election: Malampuzha
Party	Candidate	Votes	%	±%
CPI(M)	A. Prabhakaran	75,934	46.41	▲0.51
BJP	C. Krishnakumar	50,200	30.68	▲1.78
INC	S. K. Ananthakrishnan	35,444	21.66	▼0.46
NOTA	None of the above	1054	0.64	−
Independent	Abdul Raheem S.	418	0.26	
Margin of victory		25,734	15.72	▼1.28
Turnout		1,63,605		
CPI(M) hold		Swing	▲0.51	

=== 2016 ===
There were 2,02,828 registered voters in the constituency for the 2016 election.

2016 Kerala Legislative Assembly election: Malampuzha
Party	Candidate	Votes	%	±%
CPI(M)	V. S. Achuthanandan	73,299	45.90	▼11.14
BJP	C. Krishnakumar	46,157	28.90	▲28.90
INC	V. S. Joy	35,333	22.12	▼17.72
AIADMK	C. P. Sreedharan	3,154	1.97	−
NOTA	None of the above	924	0.58	−
BSP	Ravi Pallatheri	326	0.20	▼0.89
Independent	Ramesh Puduppariyaram	297	0.19	−
Independent	S. Saravanan	220	0.14	−
Margin of victory		27,142	17.00	▼0.20
Turnout		1,59,710	78.74	▲3.28
CPI(M) hold		Swing	▼11.14	

=== 2011 ===
There were 1,80,648 registered voters in the constituency for the 2011 election.

2011 Kerala Legislative Assembly election: Malampuzha
Party	Candidate	Votes	%	±%
CPI(M)	V. S. Achuthanandan	77,752	57.04	
INC	Lathika Subhash	54,312	39.84	
JD(U)	P. K. Majeed Pedikkat	2,772	2.03	−
BSP	Ravi Pallatheri	1,480	1.09	
Margin of victory		23,440	17.20	
Turnout		1,36,316	75.46	
CPI(M) hold		Swing		

=== 2006 ===
2006 Kerala Legislative Assembly election: Malampuzha
Party	Candidate	Votes	%	±%
CPI(M)	V. S. Achuthanandan	64,775	55.5%	
INC	Satheesan Pacheni	44,758	38.3%	
Margin of victory		20,017		
CPI(M) hold		Swing		

=== 2001 ===
2001 Kerala Legislative Assembly election: Malampuzha
Party	Candidate	Votes	%	±%
CPI(M)	V. S. Achuthanandan	53,661	48.6%	
INC	Satheesan Pacheni	48,958	44.3%	
Margin of victory		4,703		
CPI(M) hold		Swing		

== See also these br ==
- Malampuzha
- Palakkad district
- List of constituencies of the Kerala Legislative Assembly
- 2016 Kerala Legislative Assembly election
