= Malabar Cancer Centre, Thalassery =

Cancer research center in Kerala

- Type: Cancer Care and Research Institute
- Established: 2001
- Affiliations: Kerala University of Health Sciences
- Director: Dr. Satheesan Balasubramanyan
- Location: Thalassery, Kannur district, Kerala, India; 11.7494411°N 75.5238102°E
- Nickname: MCC
- Website: Official website

Malabar Cancer Centre (MCC) in Thalassery, Kannur district is an autonomous not-for-profit institution under Health and Family Welfare Department, Government of Kerala. In June 2022, the institute was upgraded to Post Graduate Institute of Oncology Sciences and Research.

== History ==
The Malabar Cancer Center was started in the year 2000 when Pinarayi Vijayan was the Minister for Electricity. The institution was inaugurated in 2001, by the E. K. Nayanar Government, under the Electricity Department and later handed over to the Health Department in 2008. In 2017, the Kerala Startup Mission signed a memorandum of understanding with the Malabar Cancer Center to establish a cancer care startup ecosystem in the state. In 2018, then Kerala chief minister Pinarayi Vijayan has announced that the Malabar Cancer Center will be upgraded to RCC standards. He also said that the government will take steps to set up a post-graduate center at the center. In June 2022, the institute was upgraded to Post Graduate Institute of Oncology Sciences and Research.

== Cancer Treatment Centre ==
The Malabar Cancer Center is an important government treatment center exclusively for treating cancer patients in Kerala, mainly in the Malabar region, the neighboring states of Karnataka and Tamil Nadu and Mahe, a district in the Union Territory of Puducherry. There are several disciplines in the institute including Pediatric Hematology, Pediatric Oncology, Nuclear Medicine, Radiology, and Interventional Radiology. In 2008, 1040 new patients were consulted in MCC, while in 2019 the number of new patients increased to 6500. In 2019, the number of patients seeking follow-up treatment has increased to 77477 and 4600 people have been admitted for inpatient treatment.

== Post Graduate Institute of Oncology Sciences and Research ==
The Diplomate of National Board (DNB) Course in oncology was started in 2017 as part of the upgradation of MCC, a Research Center under the Kerala University of Health Sciences, to a Post Graduate Institute. In June 2022, the Ministry of Kerala declared the Malabar Cancer Center as the Post Graduate Institute of Oncology Sciences and Research. Kerala Health Minister Veena George said that, as part of this, the center will be renamed as the Malabar Cancer Center (Post Graduate Institute of Oncology Sciences and Research). The Minister said that as a PG Institute, courses like MD, MCH and DM under the National Medical Commission could be started at the institute. Currently, about 270 students and six PhD research students are studying at the institute.

== Achievements ==
In the government sector, the Department of Ocular Oncology is being set up for the first time in the state at this institute. As of 2022, the Malabar Cancer Center is the only government-run institution in Kerala to perform Hematopoietic stem cell transplantation in children.

MCC was the only institution in Kerala to be approved for conducting human clinical trials for COVID-19 vaccine. The MCC was able to achieve this because it had all the facilities suggested by Biotechnology Industry Research Assistance Council (BIRAC).

== See also ==
- Regional Cancer Centre, Thiruvananthapuram
