= Palakkad South =

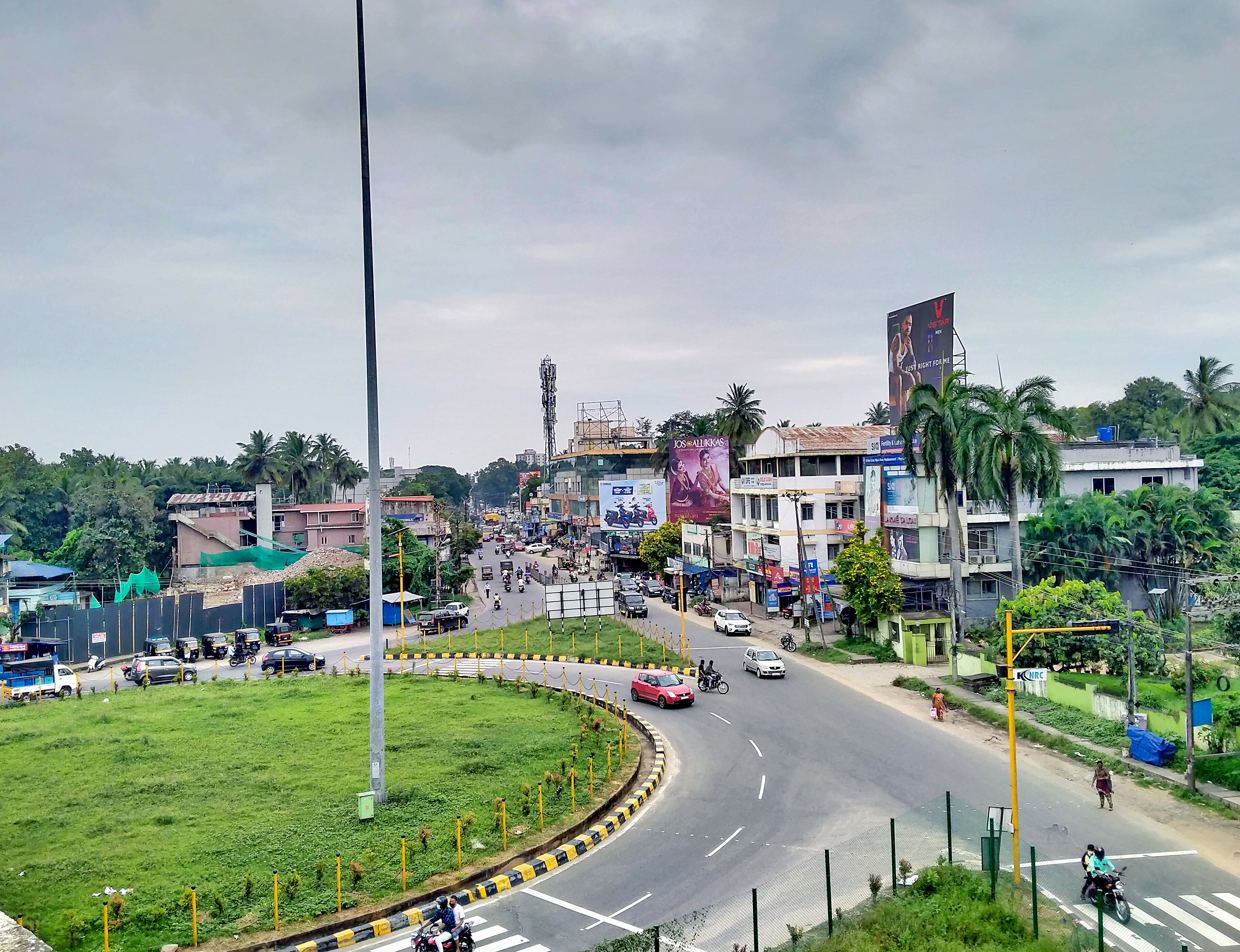
- Chandranagar roundabout
- Interactive map of Palakkad South
- Coordinates: 11.14135°N 75.82970°E
- Country: India
- State: Kerala
- Demonym: Palakkadan

Language
  - Official: Malayalam
- Time zone: UTC+5:30 (IST)
- Postal Index Number: 678 xxx
- Area code: +91-(0)491
- Vehicle registration: KL-09

Palakkad South is a region in Palakkad city consisting of the southern suburbs of the city. Kanjikode Industrial Area, the second largest industrial area in Kerala after Kochi forms part of Palakkad South. Indian Institute of Technology, Palakkad, first and the only Indian Institute of Technology in Kerala also forms part. South police station is located at Kunnathurmedu.

== Suburbs ==
- Chandranagar
- East Yakkara
- Manapullikavu
- Marutharode
- Nurani
- Kanjikode
- Kunnathurmedu
- Pudussery West
- Pudussery Central
- Thirunellai
- Vennakkara
- West Yakkara

== Institutions ==
- Indian Institute of Technology, Palakkad
- Government Medical College, Palakkad
- Ahalia Edu-Health Campus, Palakkad

== Facilities ==
Map view of facilities in and around Palakkad

== Things to Do ==
Map view of things to do in and around palakkad

== See also ==
Palakkad North
