= Pudussery =

Pudussery or Pudusseri may refer to

- Pudussery Central, a town in Palakkad district, Kerala, India
- Pudussery East, a village in Palakkad district, Kerala, India
- Pudussery West, a town in Palakkad district, Kerala, India
- Pudussery (gram panchayat), a gram panchayat serving the above towns and village
