= Kanjikode =

Kanjikode Kanchikode
- Town
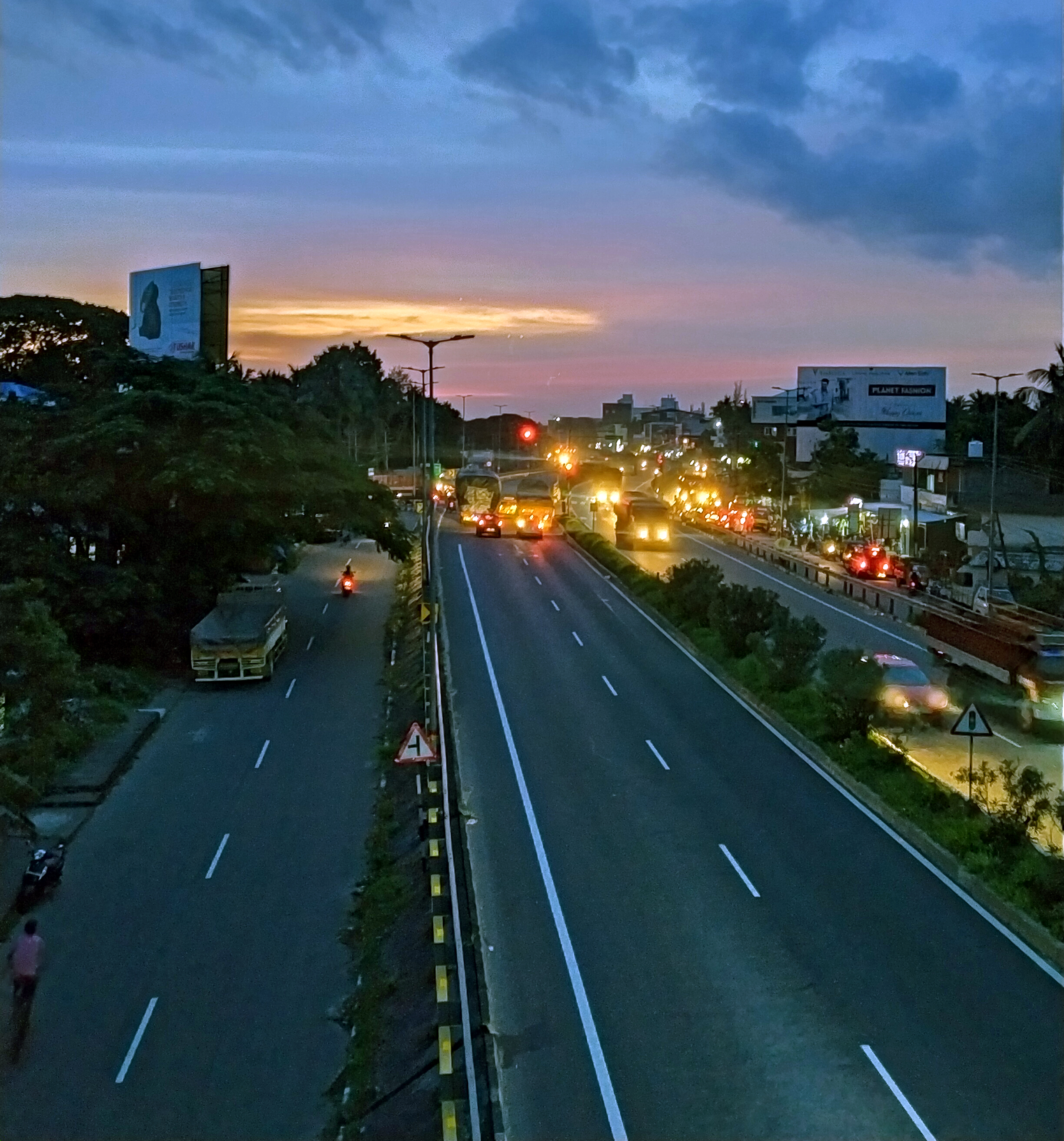
- National Highway 544 from FOB Kanjikode

- Location in Kerala, India
- Coordinates: 10.7976°N 76.7430°E
- Country: India
- State: Kerala
- District: Palakkad

Government
  - Type: Pudussery Panchayat
- Elevation: 84 m (276 ft)

Languages
  - Official: Malayalam, English
- Time zone: UTC+5:30 (IST)
- PIN: 678621
- Telephone code: 0491
- Vehicle registration: KL-09
- Parliament constituency: Palakkad
- Assembly constituency: Malampuzha

Kanjikode or Kanchikode is an industrial town located 13 km (8.1 mi) east of Palakkad. Kanjikode is the second largest industrial hub in Kerala after Kochi. The town is part of Pudussery Panchayat. It is one of the growing suburbs of Palakkad city. IIT Palakkad, the Indian Institute of Technology allotted to Kerala, was established in Kanjikode. The upcoming Industrial Smart City project is going to be established in Kanjikode.

== Location ==
Kanjikode is located about 13 km (8.1 mi) from Palakkad and 41 km (25 mi) from Coimbatore through NH 544.

== Economy ==
Kanjikode is one of the largest industrial areas in Kerala and companies like Indian Telephone Industries Limited (ITI), Instrumentation Limited, Fluid Control Research Institute, Saint-Gobain India Private Limited (formerly SEPR Refractories India Private Limited), Patspin India Ltd, Pepsi, PPS steel (Kerela) Pvt Ltd, United breweries, Empee Distilleries, Marico, Bharat Earth Movers Limited (BEML), Rubfila International Ltd, Arya Vaidya Pharmacy have production facilities. Schools like Holy Trinity, Kendriya Vidyalaya School and a fire station are situated here.There are also many other industries and manufacturing units making it second largest industrial area after Kochi.

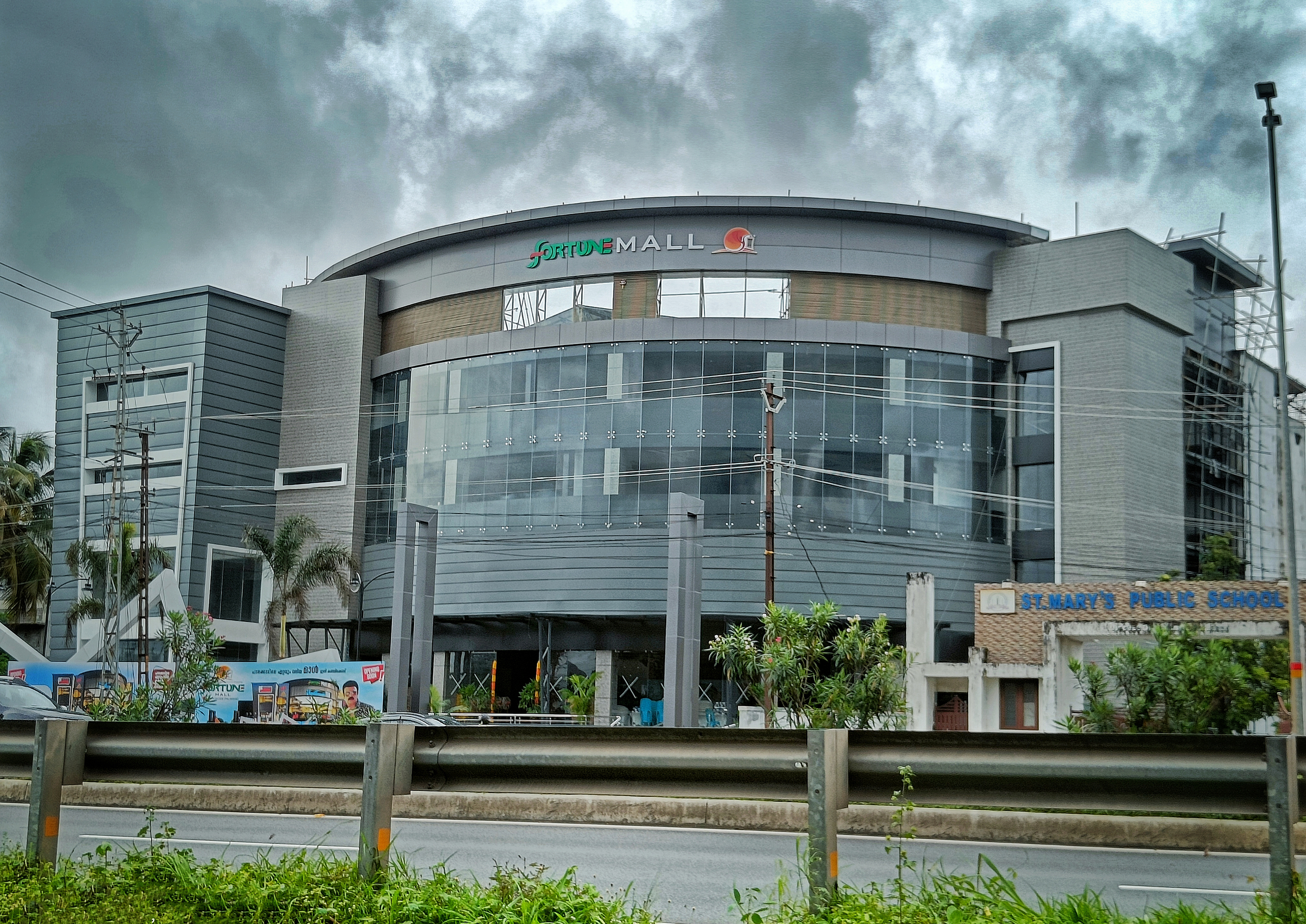
Shopping mall along the side of NH544, Kanjikode

== Education ==
- Indian Institute of Technology Palakkad
- Kendriya Vidyalaya, Kanjikode
- V V College of Science and Technology
- Ahalia Edu-Health Campus, Palakkad
- Chathamkulam MBA College - CBS

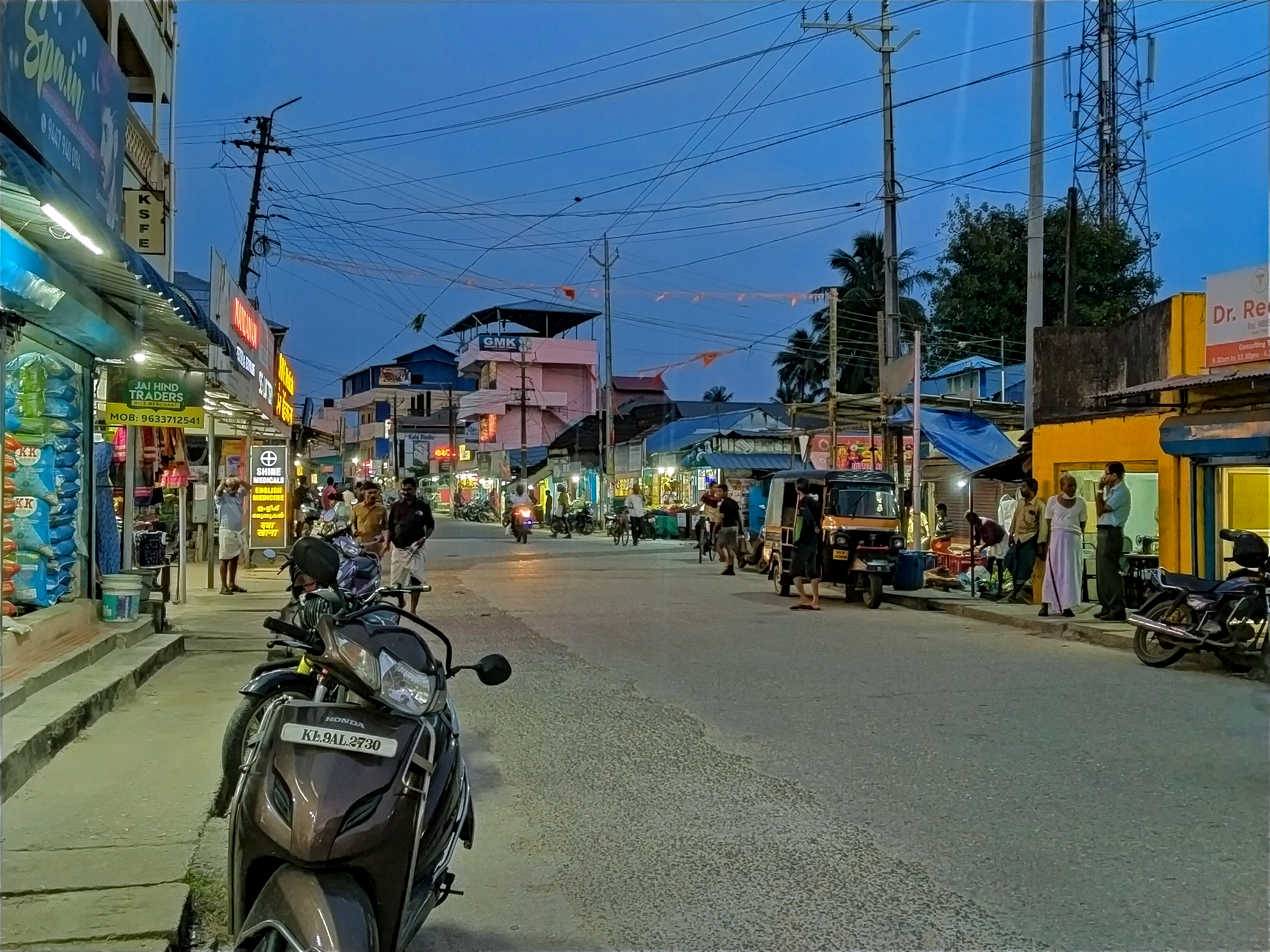
Satrapadi Junction, Kanjikode.jpg

== Access ==
A railway coach factory and an Indian Institutes of Technology are upcoming in Kanjikode. The Walayar checkpost is situated nearby. There is a Railway station situated here where local trains only stops. Frequently there are KSRTC bus services from Palakkad to Coimbatore and local bus services from Palakkad to Walayar which are passing by Kanjikode. There are also bus routes to Malampuzha and Chittur from here. Petrol pumps, automated teller machines, restaurants and rooms are available. Kanjikode belongs to Malampuzha Legislative assembly and Palakkad (Lok Sabha constituency).

Kanjikode town connects to other parts of India through Palakkad city. National Highway 544 connects to Coimbatore and Bangalore. Other parts of Kerala is accessed through National Highway 966 The nearest major railway station is Palakkad Jn. The nearest airport is Coimbatore.

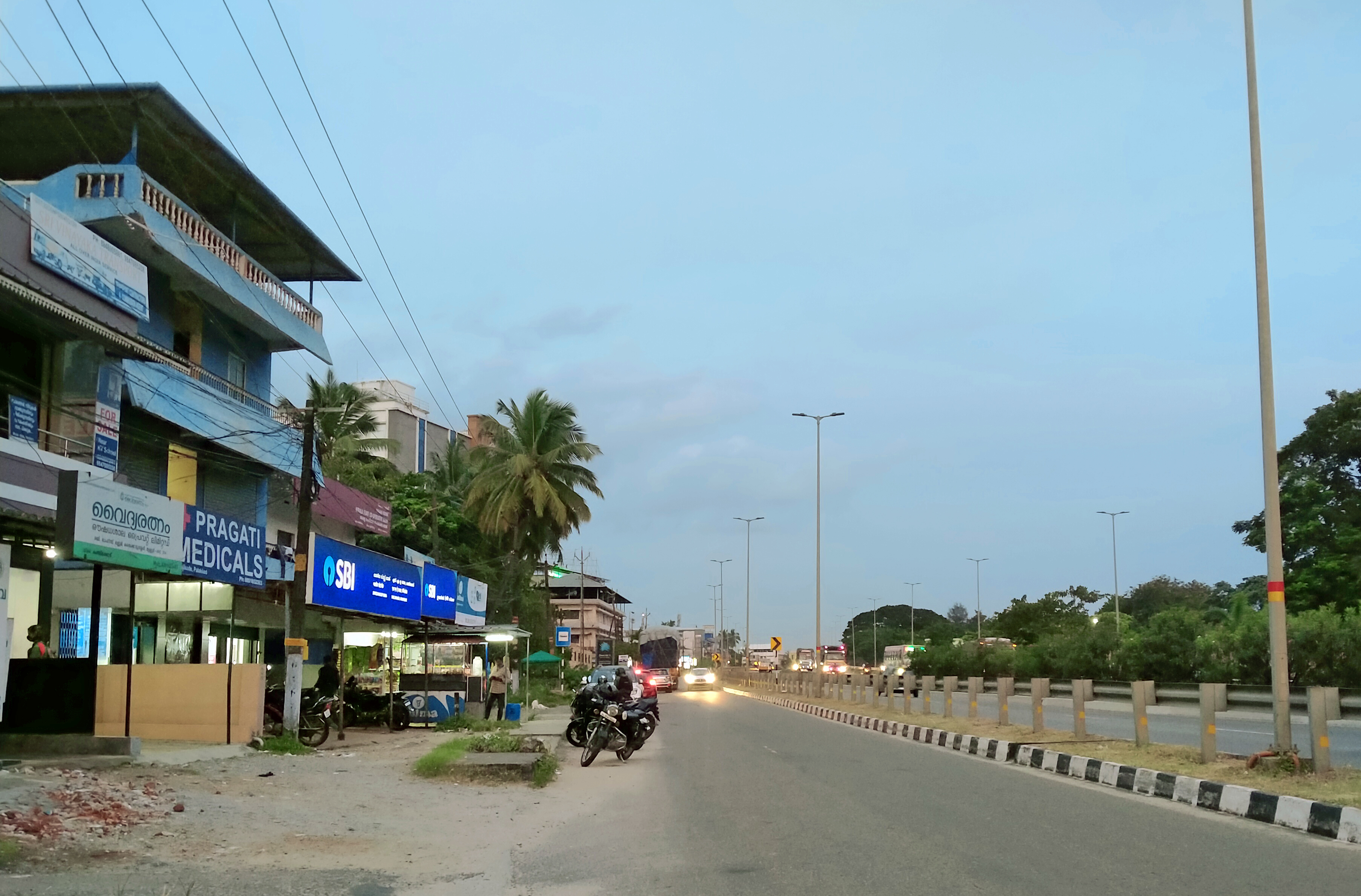
Service road Kanjikode

== See also ==
- Palakkad
- Palakkad South
- Pudussery Central
- Pudussery West
