= Pudussery East =

- village
- Location in Kerala, India Pudussery East (India)
- Coordinates: 10.672691°N 76.753138°E
- Country: India
- State: Kerala
- District: Palakkad

Population (2011)
  - Total: 14,416

Languages
  - Official: Malayalam, English
- Time zone: UTC+5:30 (IST)
- PIN: 6XXXXX
- Vehicle registration: KL-49

Pudussery East is a village in the Palakkad district, Kerala, India. Pudussery Central, Pudussery East, and Pudussery West fall under the administration of the Pudusseri Gram Panchayat.

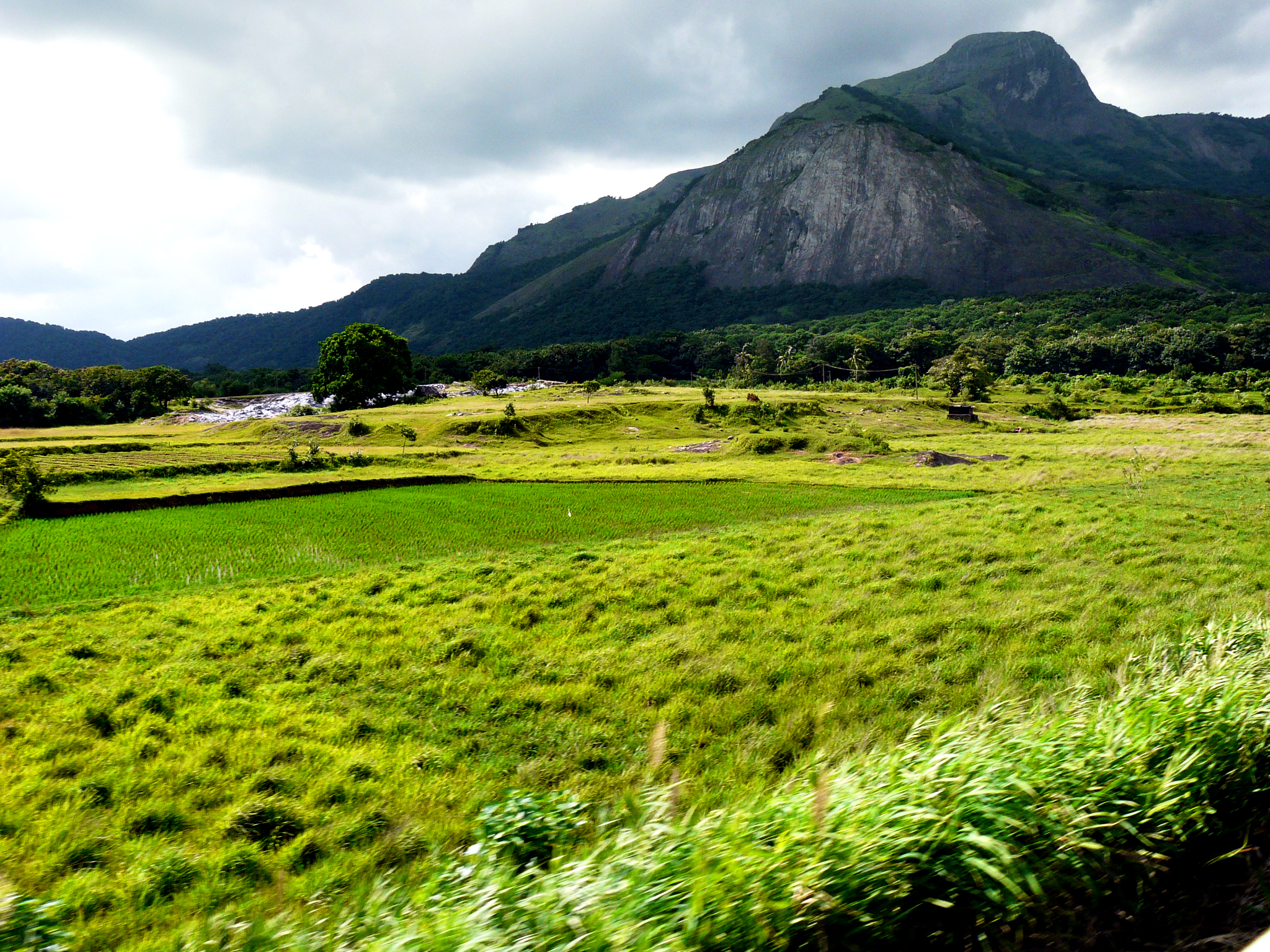
View from the Jolarpettai–Shoranur line in Pudussery Central. Background mountain towering Pudussery East.

== Demographics ==
As of 2011 India census, Pudussery East had a population of 14,416 with 7,143 males and 7,273 females.
