= P. B. Sunil Kumar =

Indian professor and administrator

Director at Indian Institute of Technology Palakkad
- In office January 2017 – September 2022
- Succeeded by: Seshadri Sekhar

Professor at Indian Institute of Technology Madras
- Incumbent
- Assumed office 2006

Personal details
- Education: University of Calicut; Raman Research Institute, Bengaluru
- Profession: Professor; Administrator
- Known for: Soft matter and Biological Physics
- Website: Official website

P. B. Sunil Kumar is an Indian physicist, professor and the founding director of IIT Palakkad, from January 2017 to September 2022. He also holds professorship^{(on lien)} at Department of Physics, IIT Madras. He is known for his research on Soft matter and Biological Physics. He is an elected member of Kerala Science Congress.

== Awards and honors ==
- Prof. M. V. Pylee Award (2019)
- Fellow of Indian Academy of Sciences (2016)
- Fellow of Indian National Science Academy (2023)

== Selected bibliography ==
=== Books ===
- Deshpande, Abhijit P.; Krishnan, J. Murali; Kumar, Sunil (2010). Rheology of Complex Fluids. Springer Science & Business Media. ISBN 978-1-4419-6494-6.

==== Chapter ====
- Kumar P.B.S., Laradji M. (2018) Protein-Induced Morphological Deformations of Biomembranes. In: Bassereau P., Sens P. (eds) Physics of Biological Membranes. Springer, Cham.

=== Selected articles ===
- Kumar, P. B. Sunil; Rao, Madan (16 March 1998). "Shape Instabilities in the Dynamics of a Two-Component Fluid Membrane". Physical Review Letters. 80 (11): 2489–2492. arXiv:cond-mat/9704171. doi:10.1103/PhysRevLett.80.2489. S2CID 119440752.
- Laradji, Mohamed; Sunil Kumar, P. B. (8 December 2005). "Domain growth, budding, and fission in phase-separating self-assembled fluid bilayers". The Journal of Chemical Physics. 123 (22): 224902. arXiv:cond-mat/0602051. doi:10.1063/1.2102894. PMID 16375505. S2CID 16373968.
- Sunil Kumar, P. B.; Gompper, Gerhard; Lipowsky, Reinhard (23 April 2001). "Budding Dynamics of Multicomponent Membranes". Physical Review Letters. 86 (17): 3911–3914. doi:10.1103/PhysRevLett.86.3911. PMID 11329355.
- Tripathy, Madhusmita; Kumar, P. B. Sunil; Deshpande, Abhijit P. (11 May 2017). "Molecular Structuring and Percolation Transition in Hydrated Sulfonated Poly(ether ether ketone) Membranes". The Journal of Physical Chemistry B. 121 (18): 4873–4884. arXiv:1701.06746. doi:10.1021/acs.jpcb.7b01045. PMID 28430444. S2CID 4765743.
- Sachin Krishnan, T. V.; Das, Sovan L.; Kumar, P. B. Sunil (2019). "Transition from curvature sensing to generation in a vesicle driven by protein binding strength and membrane tension". Soft Matter. 15 (9): 2071–2080. doi:10.1039/C8SM02623H. PMID 30734812. S2CID 73420818.
