= T. N. Seshan =

Indian civil servant and bureaucrat (1932–2019)

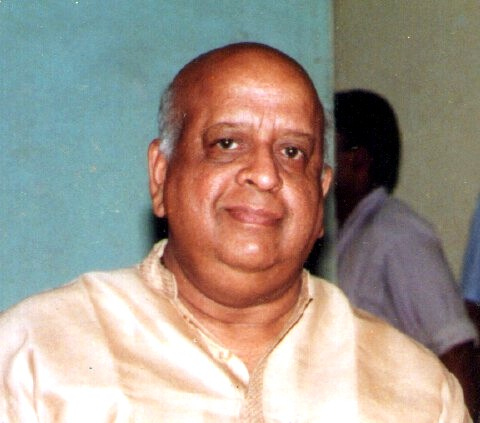

10th Chief Election Commissioner of India
- In office 12 December 1990 – 11 December 1996
- Prime Minister: Chandra Shekhar; P. V. Narasimha Rao; Atal Bihari Vajpayee; H. D. Deve Gowda
- Preceded by: V. S. Ramadevi
- Succeeded by: M. S. Gill

18th Cabinet Secretary of India
- In office 27 March 1989 – 23 December 1989
- Prime Minister: Rajiv Gandhi; V.P. Singh
- Preceded by: B. G. Deshmukh
- Succeeded by: V. C. Pande

Personal details
- Born: Tirunellai Narayana Iyer Seshan; 15 May 1932 Palghat, Malabar District, Madras Presidency, British India (present-day Kerala, India)
- Died: 10 November 2019 (aged 86) Chennai, Tamil Nadu, India
- Party: Indian National Congress (joined in 1999)
- Spouse: Jayalakshmi Seshan (m. 1959; died 2018)
- Education: Madras Christian College; Harvard University
- Occupation: Bureaucrat, Lecturer, Civil Servant, IAS officer, Statesman
- Awards: Ramon Magsaysay award (1996)

Tirunellai Narayana Iyer Seshan (15 May 1933 – 10 November 2019) was an Indian civil servant, lecturer, bureaucrat and statesman who served with the Indian Administrative Service. Prior to entering the civil service, he worked as a Physics lecturer at the Madras Christian College. After serving in various positions in Madras and in various ministries of the Central Government, he served as the 18th Cabinet Secretary of India in 1989. He was appointed the 10th Chief Election Commissioner of India (1990–1996) and became known for his electoral reforms. He won the Ramon Magsaysay Award for government service in 1996. After retirement as the CEC, he contested the 1997 Indian presidential election. He lost to K.R. Narayanan after which he unsuccessfully contested 1999 Lok sabha election from Gandhinagar constituency under the Indian National Congress.

== Early life and education ==
Seshan was born on 15 May 1933 in a Tamil Brahmin family at Thirunellai Village in Palakkad, Kerala. He was the youngest of six siblings, and his father was a lawyer in a district court. He completed his schooling at the Basel Evangelical Mission School, Palakkad, and intermediate at Government Victoria College, Palakkad, where he was a contemporary of E. Sreedharan, who is popularly known as the 'Metro Man of India.'

Though Seshan and Sreedharan were selected for the Engineering degree at JNTU Ananthapur, Seshan decided to join the Madras Christian College, Chennai (MCC). He then completed his Bachelor of Science (Hons.) degree in Physics from Madras Christian College and later taught there from 1950 to 1952. In 1953, he left the college and cleared the police service examination, but did not join. He then cleared the UPSC civil services examination in 1954 and joined the IAS as a trainee of the 1955 Tamil Nadu cadre.

== Career ==
Seshan was appointed an apprentice administrator, as an assistant collector, for a year at Coimbatore, as a trainee of the Academy of Administration in Delhi. He was first appointed sub-collector in Dindigul. He moved to the Secretariat for Rural Development in Madras (now Chennai) and appointed director of programs and deputy secretary, where he managed a local administration programme for panchayats, from 1958 to 1962.

In 1962, he was appointed the director of transport of Madras (now Tamil Nadu), and in 1964, he was appointed collector of Madurai district. After two and a half years, he went to study at Harvard University on an Edward S. Mason Fellowship, where he earned a master's degree in public administration in 1968. At Harvard, he developed a connection with Subramanian Swamy who was his associate professor.

After his return in 1969, he was appointed secretary to the Atomic Energy Commission. From 1972 to 1976, he served as joint secretary at the Department of Space. In 1976, he returned to Tamil Nadu and was appointed the state's secretary of industries and of agriculture for a brief period. After differences with the Chief Minister of Tamil Nadu, he resigned and moved to Delhi, where he was appointed as a member of the Oil and Natural Gas Commission and was in charge of personnel. After two years, he served as additional secretary to the Department of Space from 1980 to 1985. Later, he became secretary of the Ministry of Environment and Forests from 1985 to 1988. He opposed the Tehri dam and the Sardar Sarovar dam on the Narmada River during his tenure, but was overruled. He was later appointed to the additional position of Secretary of Internal Security, a role he held until 1989. In 1988, he served as secretary of the Ministry of Defence for ten months. He was appointed 18th Cabinet Secretary, the senior-most position in the Indian civil service hierarchy, in 1989 and later served as a member of Planning Commission.

He was appointed the 10th Chief Election Commissioner and served from 12 December 1990 to 11 December 1996. According to interview given by him to Business Standard, Law Minister Subramanian Swamy played a vital role in this appointment. He became best known for his electoral reforms. He redefined the status and visibility of the Election Commission of India. He identified more than hundred electoral malpractices and reformed the election process. Some of reforms he implemented include enforcement of election code of conduct, Voter IDs for all eligible voters, limit on election candidates' expenditure, appointing election officials from states other than the one facing polls. He curbed several malpractices like bribing or intimidating voters, distribution of liquor during elections, use of government funds and machinery for campaigning, appealing to voters' caste or communal feelings, use of places of worship for campaigns, use of loudspeakers and high volume music without prior written permission.

During the 1999 Indian general elections, due to his reforms, 1488 candidates were disqualified for three years for failing to submit their expenditure accounts. It was reported that he reviewed more than 40,000 expenditure accounts and disqualified 14,000 candidates for false information. In 1992, the Election Commission canceled elections in Bihar and Punjab due to electoral issues.

== Later life ==
After retirement as the CEC, he contested the 1997 Indian presidential election and lost to K.R. Narayanan. He fought on a Congress ticket against BJP'S veteran Lal Krishna Advani in 1999 from Gandhinagar and lost. He taught leadership at the Great Lakes Institute of Management in Chennai and had briefly taught at the LBSNAA, Musoorie. In 2012, the Madras High Court appointed him as an interim administrator to run the Pachaiyappa's Trust in Chennai.

He died at his home in Chennai on 10 November 2019.

== Recognition ==
He received the Ramon Magsaysay Award for government service in 1996.

== Personal life ==
He was married to Jayalakshmi Seshan from 1959 until her death in March 2018. They didn't have any children . (The Times of India dated 11th November 2019 ) He was fluent in several languages including, Malayalam, Tamil, Sanskrit, English, Hindi, Kannada, Marathi and Gujarati. He was a staunch devotee and follower of Kanchi Shankaracharya and often sought His blessings.

== Bibliography ==
- 1995: The Degeneration of India, Viking, ISBN 978-0670864508
- 1995: A Heart Full of Burden, UBS Publishers, ISBN 978-8174760272

== External References ==
- 1994: Seshan: An intimate story, by K Govindan Kutty, Konark Publishers, ISBN 978-8122003918
- Complete profile
