= IIT Palakkad =

Research institute in Kerala, India

Coordinates: 10°47′38″N 76°49′36″E

Indian Institute of Technology Palakkad
- Motto: Nurturing minds for a better world.
- Type: Public engineering school
- Established: 2015 (11 years ago)
- Chairman: Ramesh Venkateswaran
- Director: Seshadri Sekhar
- Academic staff: 127
- Students: 972
- Undergraduates: 639
- Postgraduates: 176
- Doctoral students: 157
- Location: Palakkad, Kerala, India
- Campus: 504 acres (204 ha)
- Website: iitpkd.ac.in

The Indian Institute of Technology Palakkad (IIT Palakkad or IITPkd) is a public autonomous engineering and research institute located in Palakkad, Kerala. It is one of India's 23 IITs. Proposed in the 2014 Union budget of India, IIT Palakkad was established in 2015 as an Institute of National Importance by the Government of India.

== History ==
The Indian Institutes of Technology (IITs) were established by the Government of India as Institute of National Importance through a Central Statute, the Institutes of Technology Act, 1961. The success of the IITs led to the demand for establishing more such institutions across our country. Kerala, one of India's most educationally advanced states, had a long pending demand for an IIT. In 2012, then Prime Minister Manmohan Singh said that the Centre was seriously considering a proposal to set up an IIT in Kerala under the Twelfth Plan.

In July 2014, an IIT in the state of Kerala was proposed in the 2014 Union budget of India, the first budget of Narendra Modi led NDA government. On November 20, 2014, IIT Madras was designated as the mentor institute by the Ministry of Human Resources and Human Development, and the director of IIT Madras, Bhaskar Ramamurthi assumed the role of Mentor Director. The institute's first academic session commenced on August 3, 2015 with 120 students – 30 each in Civil Engineering, Computer Science Engineering, Electrical Engineering and Mechanical Engineering.

IIT Palakkad was incorporated in the Institutes of Technology Act, 1961, through the Institutes of Technology (Amendment) Act, 2016, in September 2016.

The institute's logo is inspired by the (5,3) torus knot.

In January 2017, P. B. Sunil Kumar, who was the Professor-in-charge, was appointed as the Director by then President of India, Pranab Mukherjee. A. Seshadri Sekhar, professor and head of the department of mechanical engineering at the IIT Madras, succeeded P. B. Sunil Kumar as the director of the institute in October 2022.

== Campus and location ==
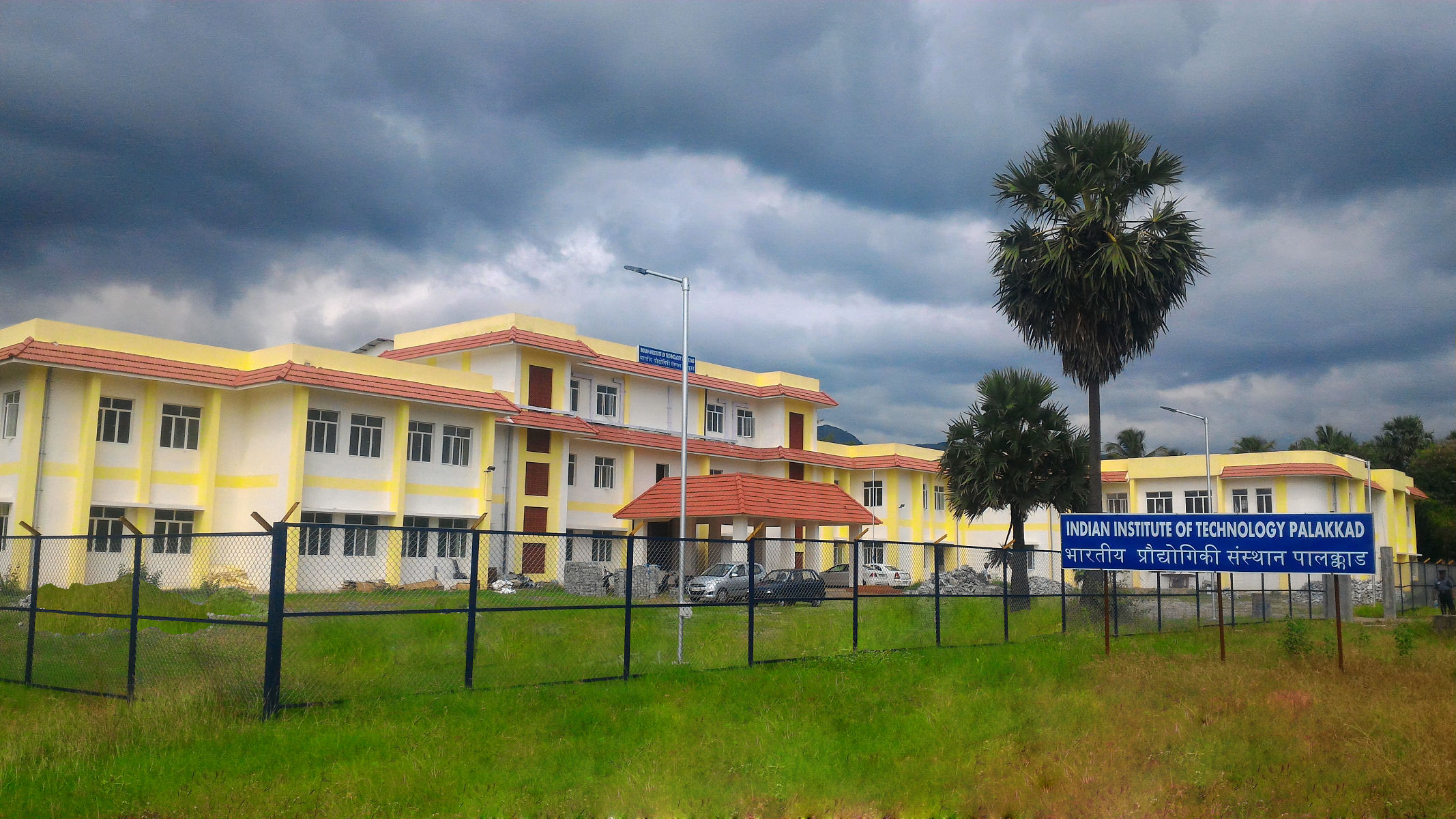
Academic Block of now defunct temporary campus

The institute started functioning in August 2015 from a temporary site located inside the Ahalia Health Heritage & Knowledge Village, Palakkad. The permanent campus, situated in Kanjikode and divided into two sections—Nila (approximately 40 acres) and Sahyadri (about 500 acres) situated opposite each other—saw academic activities commence in the Nila Campus in February 2019. By August 2023, the institute had fully relocated its operations to the permanent campus. Several buildings and hostels in the permanent campus are named after Indian classical ragas.

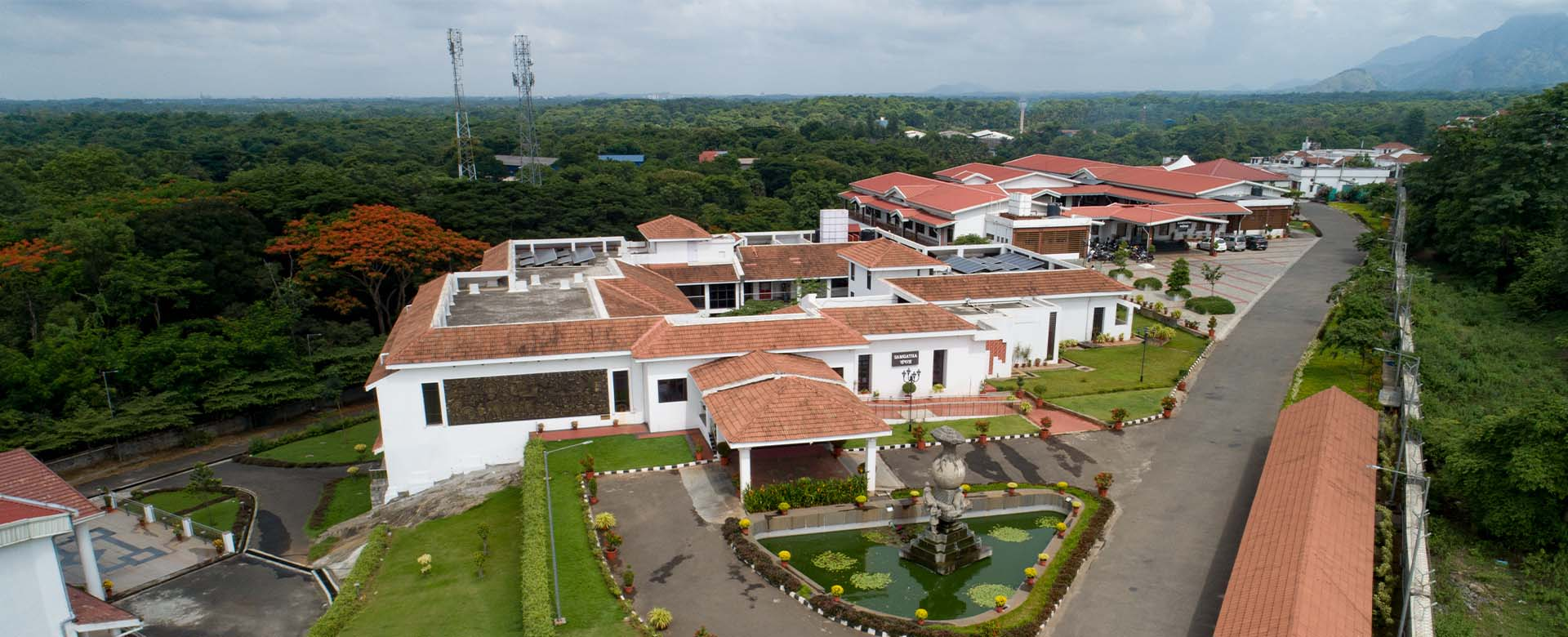
Aerial View of Nila Campus

The Nila Campus includes an auditorium, multimedia-enabled classrooms (both small and large), student laboratories, a library, a canteen, and Wi-Fi-enabled hostels that allow mobility in Internet access. The academic space and the laboratory complex are named Samgatha and Manogatha, respectively. Students are accommodated in three hostels: Bageshri, Brindavani, and Tilang.

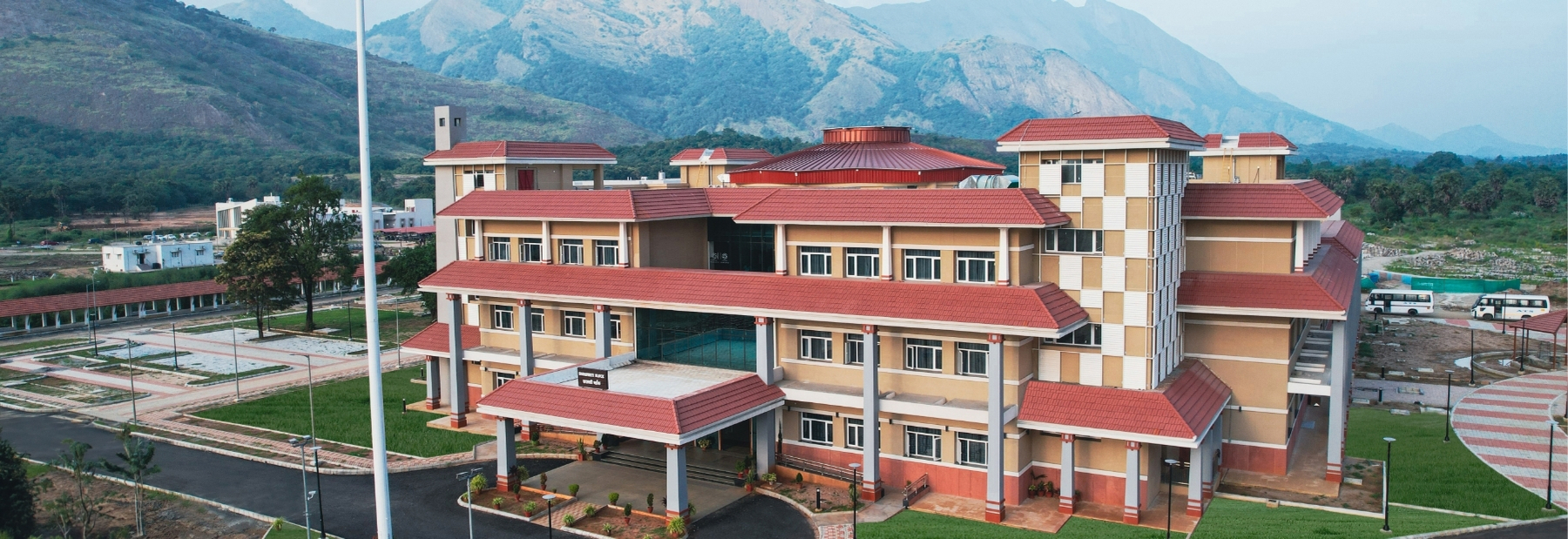
Saraswathi Block, Sahyadri Campus

The Sahyadri Campus, located on 504 acres near the Western Ghats, integrates modern infrastructure with eco-friendly practices aimed at achieving a net-zero carbon footprint. The Saraswathi Block serves as the main academic building and has a capacity for 2,000 students. Students on this campus reside in the Malhar and Saveri hostels.

== Academics ==
IIT Palakkad currently offers four-year Bachelor of Technology (B.Tech) and two years MS programmes in different engineering disciplines. Similar to the other IITs, admission to undergraduate programmes is based on qualification through the extremely competitive Indian Institute of Technology Joint Entrance Examination (IIT-JEE). In addition to that, Ph.D programme is also offered in all the disciplines of Science and Engineering. It is also offering Master of Technology (M.Tech) in two disciplines from the year 2019 in which candidates having valid GATE (Graduate Aptitude Test in Engineering) scores are eligible to apply. From 2019, M.Sc programmes in Physics and Chemistry are also be offered. The admissions to these programmes are through IIT-JAM.

In 2022, the institute introduced flexible choice based B.Tech programs and degree options alongside a new B.Tech program in Data Science and Engineering.

IIT Palakkad offers programmes in 8 disciplines.

- Civil Engineering
- Computer Science & Engineering
- Electrical Engineering
- Mechanical Engineering
- Chemistry
- Physics
- Mathematics
- Humanities
- Data Science
- Biological Science and Engineering
- Materials and Metallurgical Engineering

== Ranking ==
University rankings

Engineering – India
- NIRF (2024): 64

IIT Palakkad is ranked 64th among the engineering colleges of India by National Institutional Ranking Framework (NIRF) in 2024.

== See also ==
- Indian Institutes of Technology
- List of universities in India
