= 1997 Indian vice presidential election =

Vice-presidential election in India

← 1992	16 August 1997	2002 →
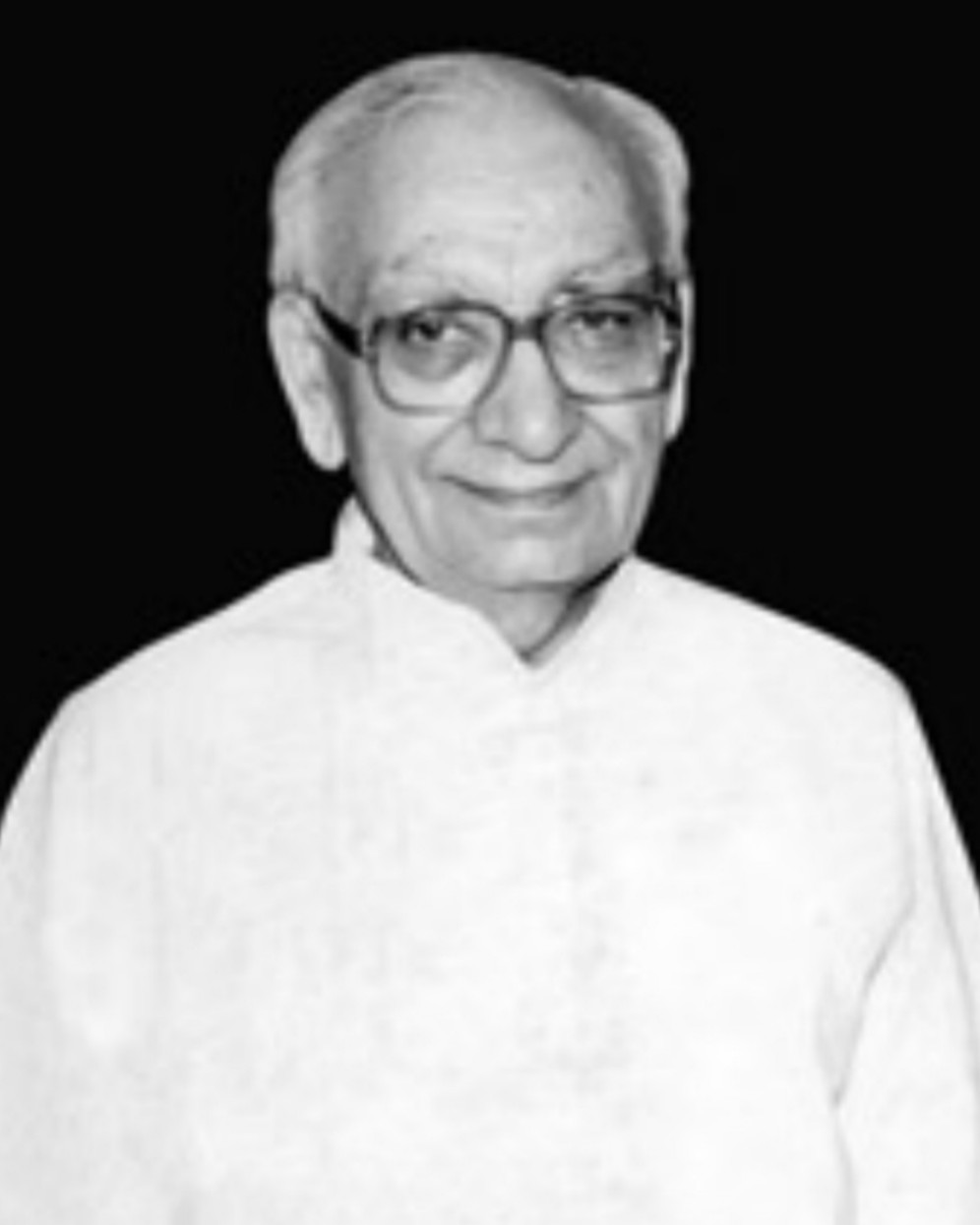

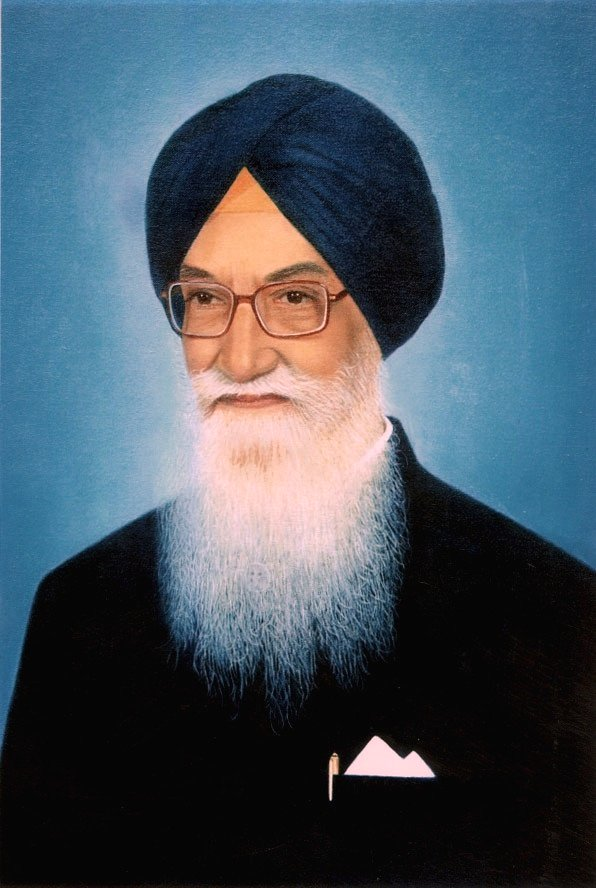
Nominee	Krishan Kant	Surjit Singh Barnala
Party	JD	SAD
Alliance	United Front
Home state	Punjab	Punjab
Electoral vote	441	273
Percentage	61.76%	38.24%
Vice President before election
Vacant, last held by
K. R. Narayanan
INC
Elected Vice President
Krishan Kant
JD

The 1997 Indian vice presidential election was held on 16 August 1997 to elect the vice president of India. Krishan Kant defeated Surjit Singh Barnala to become tenth vice president of India. At the time of the election, VP office was vacant since the incumbent, K. R. Narayanan, had already inaugurated as President following his victory in the presidential election.

== Candidates ==
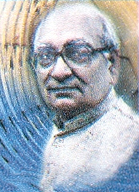
Former Governor of Tamil Nadu
Krishan Kant

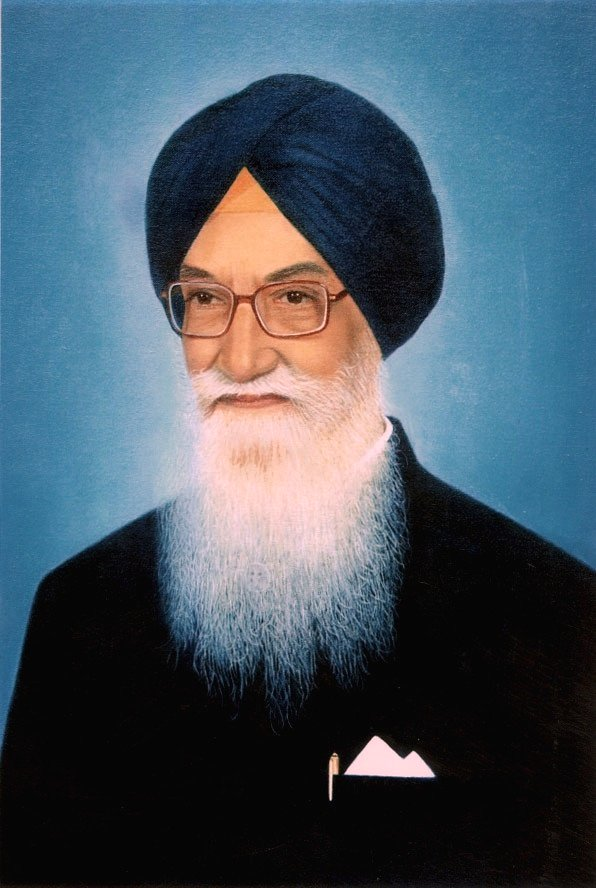
Former Chief Minister of Punjab
Surjit Singh Barnala

== Results ==
Result of the Indian vice-presidential election, 1997
Candidate	Party	Electoral Votes	% of Votes
Krishan Kant	Janata Dal	441	61.76
Surjit Singh Barnala	SAD	273	38.24
Total		714	100.00
Valid Votes		714	93.95
Invalid Votes		46	6.05
Turnout		760	96.20
Abstentions		30	3.80
Electors		790	

== See also ==
- 1997 Indian presidential election
