= Kendriya Vidyalaya, Kanjikode =

- പി എം ശ്രീ കേന്ദ്രീയ വിദ്യാലയം കഞ്ചിക്കോട്
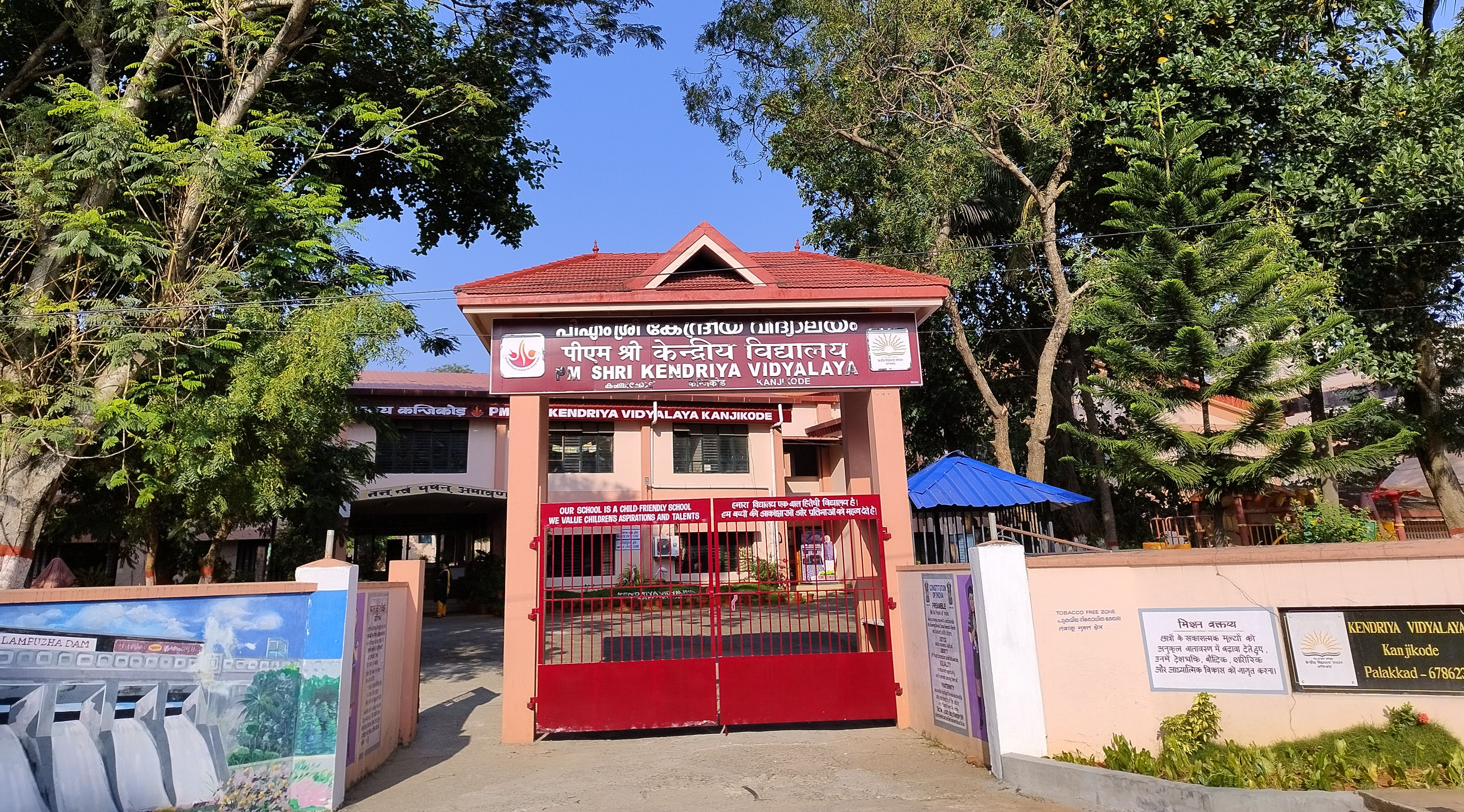
- Main gate

Location
- Kanjikode West; Palakkad, Kerala; India; 10.7945°N 76.7286°E

Information
- School district: Palakkad
- Chairman: P K Vasisht, Additional General Manager and Unit Head, Instrumentation Limited, Kanjikode
- Principal: S Harilal
- Headmaster: Sheela PR, I/c HM
- Faculty: 69
- Teaching staff: 69
- Gender: Mixed, co-education
- Enrollment: 2238
- Houses: Narmada, Kaveri, Ganga, Brahmaputra
- Affiliation: CBSE
- Website: no2palakkad.kvs.ac.in

Kendriya Vidyalaya, Kanjikode, officially Kendriya Vidyalaya No.2 Palakkad, is a Senior Secondary School (Std 1-12) affiliated to the Central Board of Secondary Education (CBSE), New Delhi and functions under the purview of Kendriya Vidyalaya Sangathan (KVS), an autonomous government body. In 2023, the Vidyalaya was selected for the Pradhan Mantri Schools for Rising India (PM SHRI) scheme launched by the Ministry of Education.

Located at Kanjikode, Kerala, the campus is spread over 8.6 acres (35,000 m^{2}) of land.

The school has classes from I to XII. It has maintained a 100% pass percentage record in class X and XII.

Apart from academics, the school encourages students to participate in extra-curricular activities, competitions and games and sports events organized by the KV Sangathan and other schools at national level.

== History ==
The Vidyalaya started functioning in a temporary building at Sathrapadi, Kanjikode in 1986. Later the campus was shifted to the present location on Malampuzha Road, Kanjikode in 1993 to the land sponsored by M/s. Instrumentation Limited, Kanjikode. Class XII students passed out during the years 1991 and 1993 respectively. Presently the vidyalaya has a strength of more than 2150 students and staff strength of 58 including Principal, teaching and non teaching members. The vidyalaya was designated as model Kendriya Vidyalaya in 1999–2000. Later on, it was termed “Pilot KV”. It has been selected as mother rlink KV to award computer literacy free of cost to the children of the neighboring schools run by the state government. KV Kanjikode was ranked among the Top 10 Best Govt Day School in the country by Education World in 2016 and 2017.

The new Annex for the Vidyalaya was inaugurated on 29 March 2012. The new annex has got 12 class rooms and 6 departments.

== Faculty ==
The school has teaching staff members, in three categories: post-graduate teachers (PGTs), trained graduate teachers (TGTs) and primary teachers (PRTs).The school also appoints teachers on the basis of contracts.

== Student Activities ==
The school encourages the students to take part in national level competitions and examinations to increase their exposure and also conducts workshops to update the students with information in the fields of Science, and Commerce.

A few student activities are listed below :

- Educational Trips
- Green Olympiad
- Mathematics Olympiad
- National Level Essay and Painting Competitions
- National Talent Search Exam
- Scouting activities
- Think Quest
- Youth Parliament
- National Cyber Olympiad
- National Science Olympiad
- International Mathematics Olympiads

For CCA activities and house contests, the students are placed into four houses: Ganga (red), Narmada (green), Kaveri (yellow) and Brahmaputra (blue).

== Infrastructure facilities ==
=== Multipurpose hall ===
A new multipurpose hall was built in the year 2007 for organizing special programmes and conducting various activities

=== e-Classrooms ===
The Vidyalaya has 25 e-Classrooms equipped with interactive board and multimedia projectors.

=== Computer laboratories ===
The Vidyalaya has separate Computer labs for the primary, secondary and senior secondary sections well equipped with 24 hour broadband Internet connectivity and UPS backup. The entire campus has Wi-Fi facility.

=== Children's Park and Science Park ===
Renovated the Children's Park Science Park and a Science Park was installed in the Vidyalaya in the year 2013.

=== Sports facilities ===
Vidyalaya has facilities for table tennis, badminton, volleyball, kho-kho, kabaddi and basketball. A new basketball court was built which was inaugurated by Sri. C Karunakaran, AC, KVS RO Ernakulam in July 2015.

=== Library ===
The school library is one of the best school libraries in the country. The library has a collection of 19,000+ books and subscribes to 52 periodicals. The library was shortlisted for LibTech Award 2019 for best integration of technology and won the Indian Reading Olympiad 2021 Award under Reading for Pleasure - School category for the innovative practices for motivating reading. The library also won KVS National Innovation & Experimentation Award 2019 for the innovative project "Library Points: Rewarding the Readers".

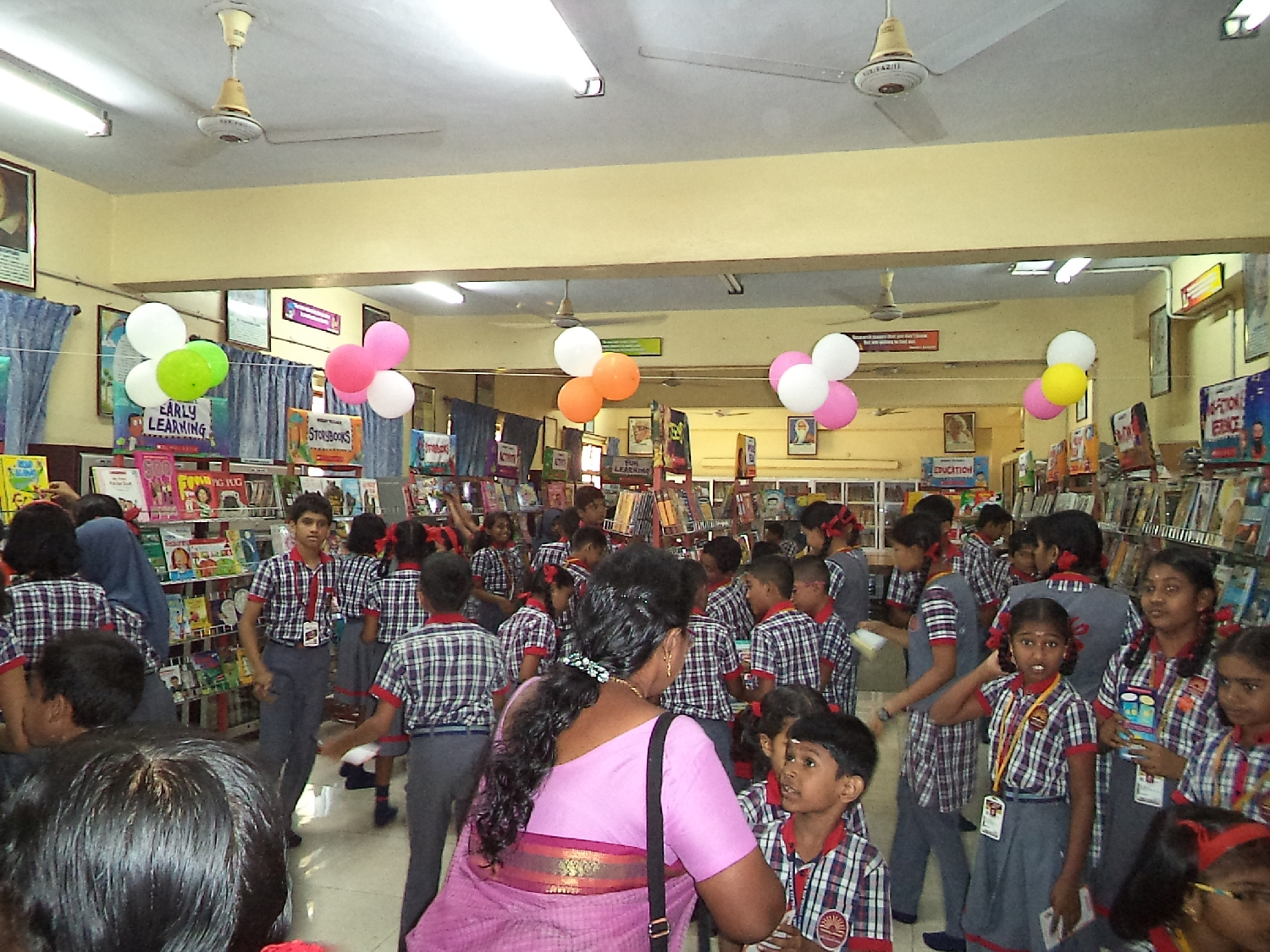
Book Fair in Kendriya Vidyalaya Kanjikode Library

The E-learning and Digital Library, launched in 2020, is the first of its kind in the country providing online reading and learning content to the students.

== Achievements ==
Kendriya Vidyalaya Kanjikode ranked 7th in the EducationWorld India School Rankings 2017. On 29 July 2025 became the sole Kendriya Vidyalaya from the Ernakulam region to be “dedicated to the nation” as part of the Akhil Bharatiya Shiksha Samagam (ABSS) celebrating the fifth anniversary of the National Education Policy, 2020.

== Sports Activities ==
The school organises a sports day annually in which the Houses take part in intra-school sports events. The school has won many trophies in Football, Cricket, Athletics and other games at the regional and national levels.

The school consists of two Children Parks which provide recreation to the primary students.
