= 1997 Indian presidential election =

Election of K. R. Narayanan

- 17 July 1997
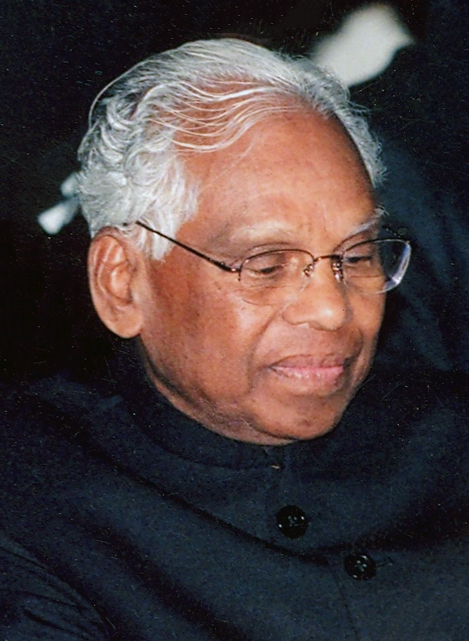

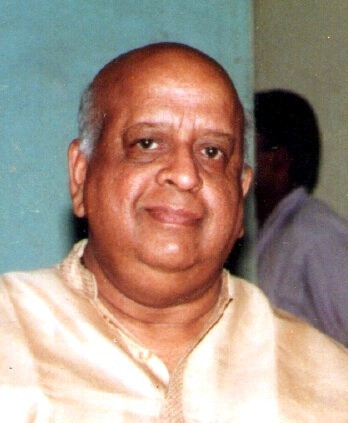
Nominee	K. R. Narayanan	T. N. Seshan
Party	INC	Independent
Home state	Kerala	Kerala
Electoral vote	956,290	50,631
States carried	29+NCT+PY	0
Percentage	95.0%	5.0%
Swing	29.1% ▲	New
President before election
Shankar Dayal Sharma
INC(I)
Elected President
K. R. Narayanan
INC

The 11th presidential election of India was held on 17 July 1997. With 956,290 votes, K. R. Narayanan overcame his nearest rival T. N. Seshan who received 50,631 votes. Narayanan was the first Dalit to be elected President of India.

== Candidates ==
=== United Front + INC ===
United Front + Indian National Congress
For President

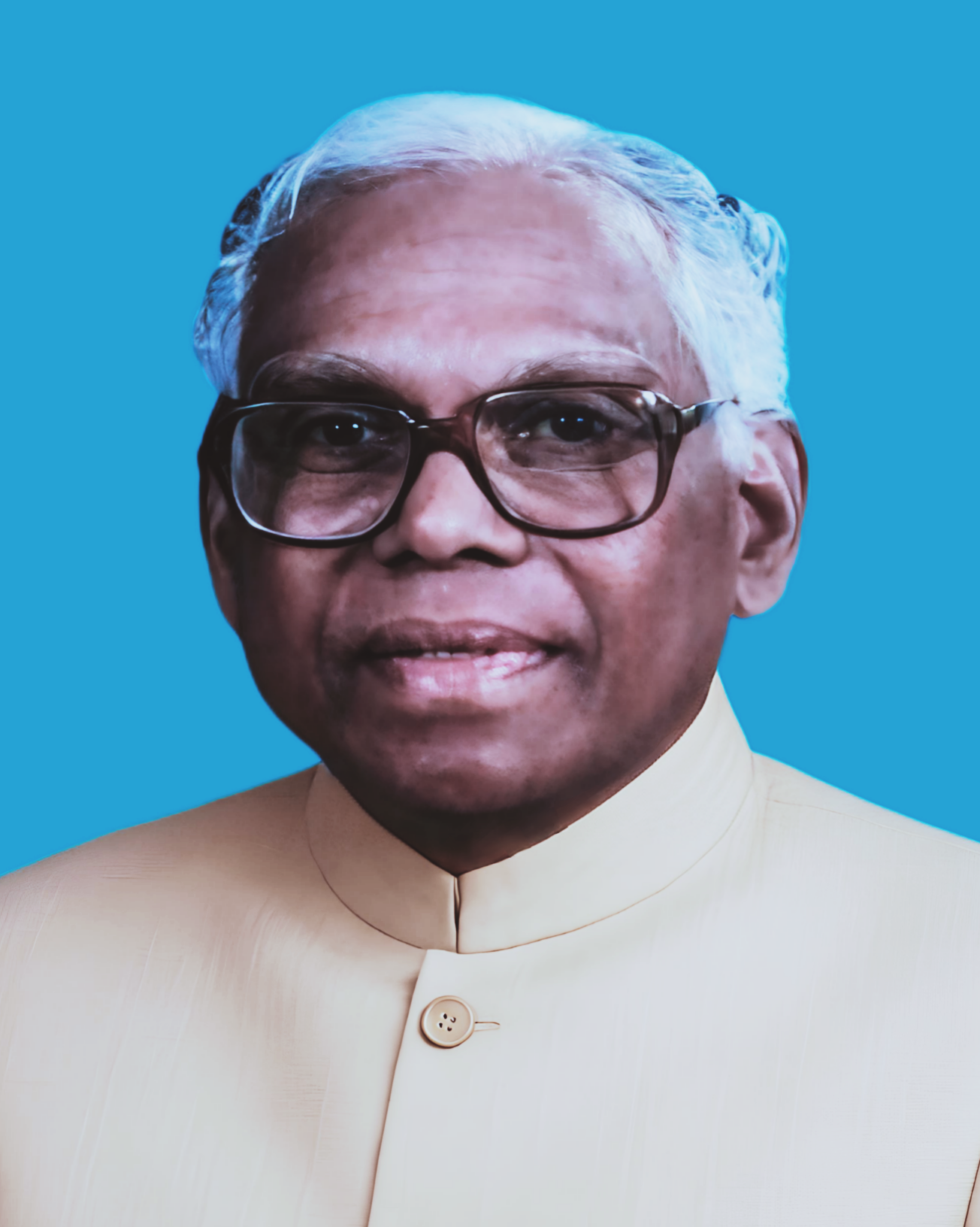

Vice President
K. R. Narayan

Indian National Congress

=== Independent (backed by Shiv Sena) ===
Independent
For President

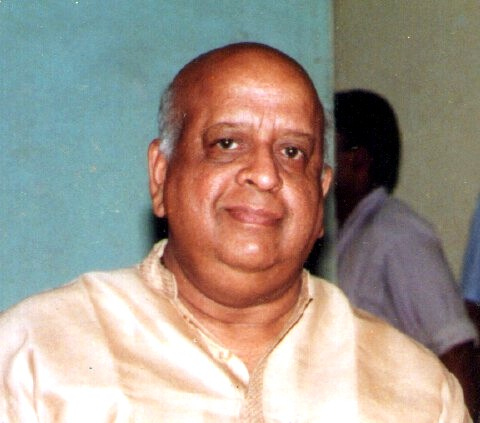

Former Chief Election Commissioner of India
T. N. Seshan

Independent

== Results ==
States	No. of MLA/MPs	Value of each Vote	K. R. Narayanan (Votes)	K. R. Narayanan (Values)	T. N. Seshan (Votes)	T. N. Seshan (Values)	Invalid (Votes)	Invalid (Values)
Members of Parliament	776	708	676	478,608	26	18,408	32	22,656
Andhra Pradesh	294	148	254	37,592	9	1,332	17	2,516
Arunachal Pradesh	60	8	56	448	0	0	3	24
Assam	126	116	110	12,760	5	580	1	116
Bihar	324	174	285	49,590	8	1,392	15	2,610
Goa	40	20	35	700	2	40	3	60
Gujarat	182	147	156	22,932	11	1,617	7	1,029
Haryana	90	112	77	8,624	3	336	6	672
Himachal Pradesh	68	51	63	3,213	0	0	2	102
Jammu and Kashmir	87	72	74	5,328	1	72	4	288
Karnataka	224	131	191	25,021	13	1,703	11	1,441
Kerala	140	152	135	20,520	0	0	2	304
Madhya Pradesh	320	130	296	38,480	9	1,170	13	1,690
Maharashtra	288	175	173	30,275	96	16,800	1	175
Manipur	60	18	52	936	4	72	0	0
Meghalaya	60	17	43	731	10	170	4	68
Mizoram	40	8	34	272	2	16	0	0
Nagaland	60	9	55	495	2	18	0	0
Orissa	147	149	132	19,668	0	0	9	1,341
Punjab	117	116	106	12,296	1	116	7	812
Rajasthan	200	129	174	22,446	4	516	12	1,548
Sikkim	32	7	31	217	0	0	0	0
Tamil Nadu	234	176	229	40304	2	352	2	352
Tripura	60	26	59	1534	0	0	0	0
Uttar Pradesh	425	208	377	78,416	24	4,992	7	1,456
West Bengal	294	151	272	41,072	5	755	4	604
Delhi	70	58	58	3,364	3	174	8	464
Pondicherry	30	16	28	448	0	0	1	16
TOTAL	4,848	3,232	4,231	956,290	240	50,631	171	22,656
Source: Election Commission of India.

== See also ==
- 1997 Indian vice presidential election
