= Kunnathurmedu =

- Suburb
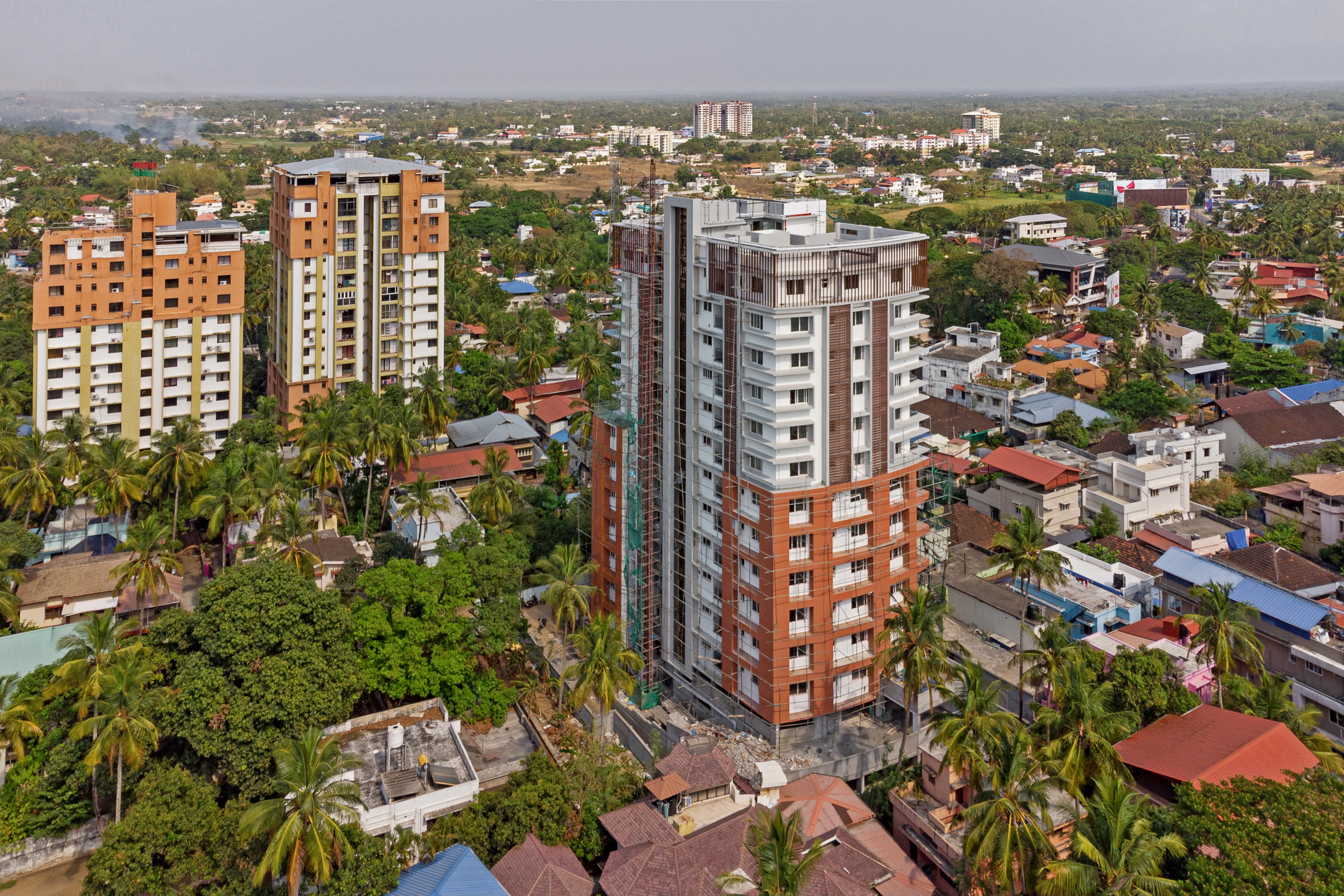
- Palakkad city view from Kunnathurmedu

- Location in Kerala, India Kunnathurmedu (India)
- Coordinates: 10°49′N 76°39′E
- Country: India
- State: Kerala
- District: Palakkad

Government
  - Body: Palakkad Municipality

Languages
  - Official: Malayalam, English
- Time zone: UTC+5:30 (IST)
- PIN: 678 013
- Telephone code: 0491
- Vehicle registration: KL-09
- Parliament constituency: Palakkad
- Assembly constituency: Palakkad

Kunnathurmedu is a commercial, residential and institutional area in Palakkad city, Kerala, India. It mainly consists of residential colonies and apartments. Kunnathurmedu is wards 23 and 24 of Palakkad Municipality. Several offices related to the Police service of the city including Palakkad South and Traffic Police stations are situated here.
