= Institutes of Technology Act, 1961 =

Act of the Parliament of India

Parliament of India
- Long title: An Act to declare certain institutions of technology to be institutions of national importance and to provide for certain matters connected with such institutions and the Indian Institute of Technology, Kharagpur.
- Citation: Act No. 59 of 1961
- Enacted by: Parliament of India
- Enacted: 19 December 1961
- Assented to: 19 December 1961
- Commenced: 1 April 1962

Repeals
- Indian Institute of Technology (Kharagpur) Act, 1956

Amended by
- Institutes of Technology (Amendment) Act, 1963 (Act 29 of 1963); Delegated Legislation Provisions (Amendment) Act, 1985 (Act 4 of 1986); Institutes of Technology (Amendment) Act, 1994 (Act 35 of 1994); Institutes of Technology (Amendment) Act, 2002 (Act 16 of 2002); Institutes of Technology (Amendment) Act, 2012 (Act 34 of 2012); Institutes of Technology (Amendment) Act, 2016 (Act 41 of 2016)
- Status: In force

The Institutes of Technology Act, 1961 is a legislation in India giving legal status, including degree granting powers, to the Indian Institutes of Technology (IITs). It was notified in the gazette as Act number 59 of 1961 on 20 December 1961 and came into effect on 1 April 1962. The Act also declares these institutes as Institutes of National Importance.

== Amendments ==
=== 1963 ===
The Institutes of Technology (Amendment) Act, 1963 was enacted to bring Indian Institute of Technology Delhi under the act with effect from 13 September 1963.

=== 1994 ===
The Institutes of Technology (Amendment) Act, 1994 was enacted to bring Indian Institute of Technology Guwahati under the act with effect from 1 September 1994.

=== 2002 ===
The Institutes of Technology (Amendment) Act, 2002 was enacted to bring Indian Institute of Technology Roorkee under the act with effect from 21 September 2001.

=== 2011 ===
The Institutes of Technology (Amendment) Bill, 2011 brought eight new IITs under the purview of the act, as well as recognised IIT-BHU as an IIT. The bill was passed in the Rajya Sabha on 30 April 2012.

=== 2016 ===
The Institutes of Technology (Amendment) Bill, 2016 was introduced in Lok Sabha by Prakash Javadekar, Minister of Human Resource Development, on 19 July 2016 to bring six new Indian Institutes of Technology and Indian School of Mines, Dhanbad under the purview of the act. The Bill was passed by the Lok Sabha on 25 July 2016. The Rajya Sabha passed the Bill on 2nd, August 2016. The Bill was assented to by the President of India on 9 August 2016 and a Gazette Notification was published on 10 August 2016.
