= Biological Physics =

Book by Philip Nelson, illustrated by David Goodsell

Biological Physics: Energy, Information, Life: With new art by David Goodsell is a book by Philip Nelson, illustrated by David Goodsell. The fifth printing was published by W. H. Freeman in late 2013. It is a work on biology with an emphasis on the application of physical principles.
