= Yakkara =

- Suburb
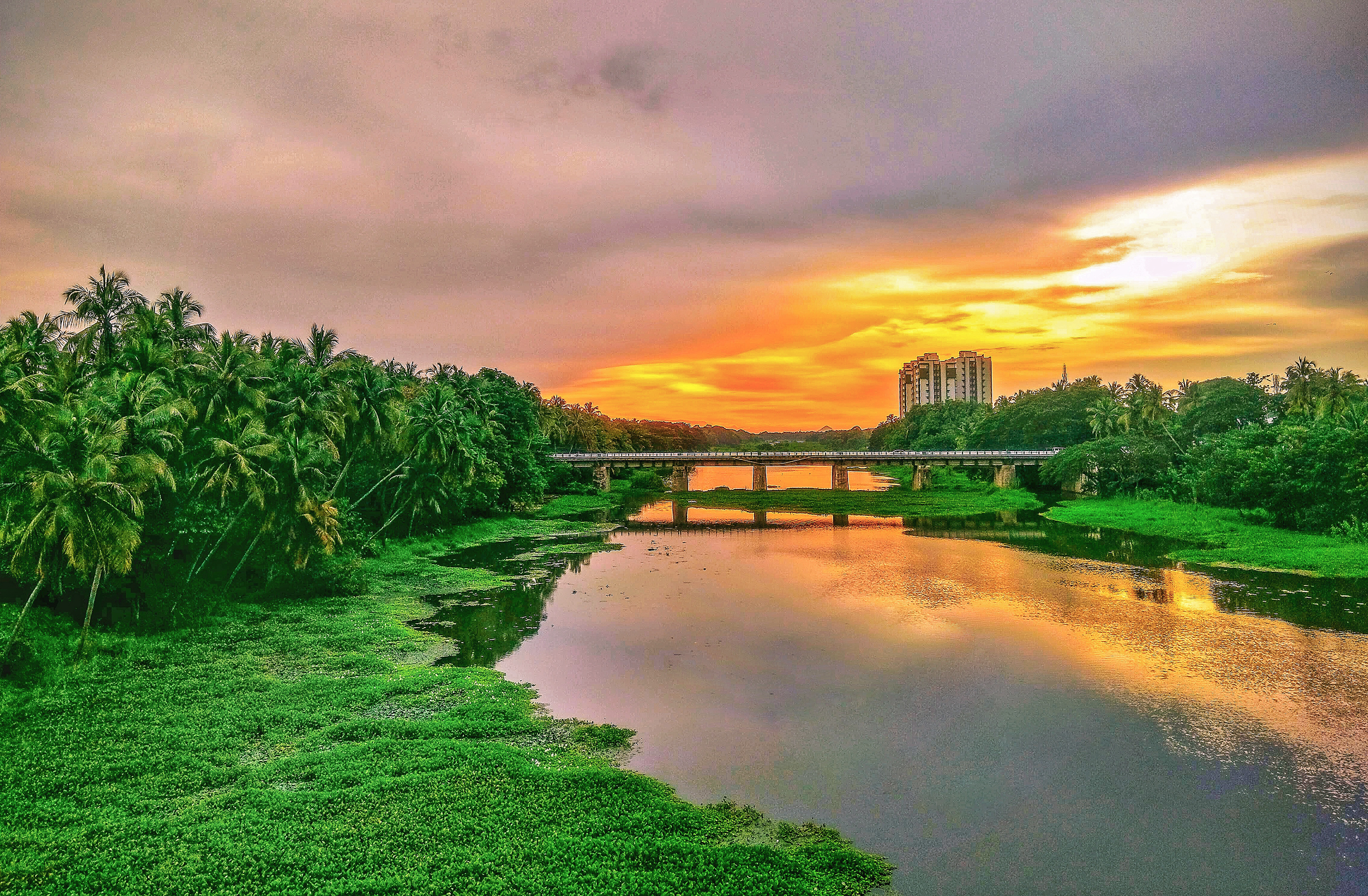

- Location in Palakkad District
- Coordinates: 10.7566062°N 76.6497668°E
- Country: India
- State: Kerala
- District: Palakkad
- Local body: Palakkad Municipality

Languages
  - Official: Malayalam
- Time zone: UTC+5:30 (IST)
- PIN: 6780013,678701
- Telephone code: 91-0491
- Vehicle registration: KL 09
- Lok Sabha: Palakkad
- Kerala Assembly: Palakkad

Yakkara, is an area in the city of Palakkad, Kerala, India. It is located approximately 4 kilometers from the city centre and is predominantly segregated as West Yakkara and East Yakkara.Government Medical College, Palakkad is located in East Yakkara.

It is said that in ancient times, Yagas were performed on the Banks of the River Shokanasini (Bharathapuzha). Thus the area came to be known as ‘Yaga-kara’ which later came to be known as ‘Yakkara’

Yakkara belongs to Palakkad Assembly constituency in the Kerala Legislature.

Shri Shafi Parambil of the Indian National Congress (INC) was elected as the Member of Legislative assembly from this constituency in 2021 Kerala Assembly elections. It is a part of the Palakkad Lok Sabha constituency, represented by Shri V K Sreekandan

== Places of interest ==
Sree Vishveshwara temple is said to be founded by Sri Narayana Guru. Thottingal family members provided land and the founder members were from Thottingal family. The Bharathapuzha river flows through the West Yakkara village and St Mary's Orthodox Syrian Church is situated on the DPO Road.

An Airport was proposed by government agencies to be located in Yakkara. The district administration had identified 60 acres of land for this purpose. The aim was that, the Airport will connect the district headquarters with international airports and major cities in the State.

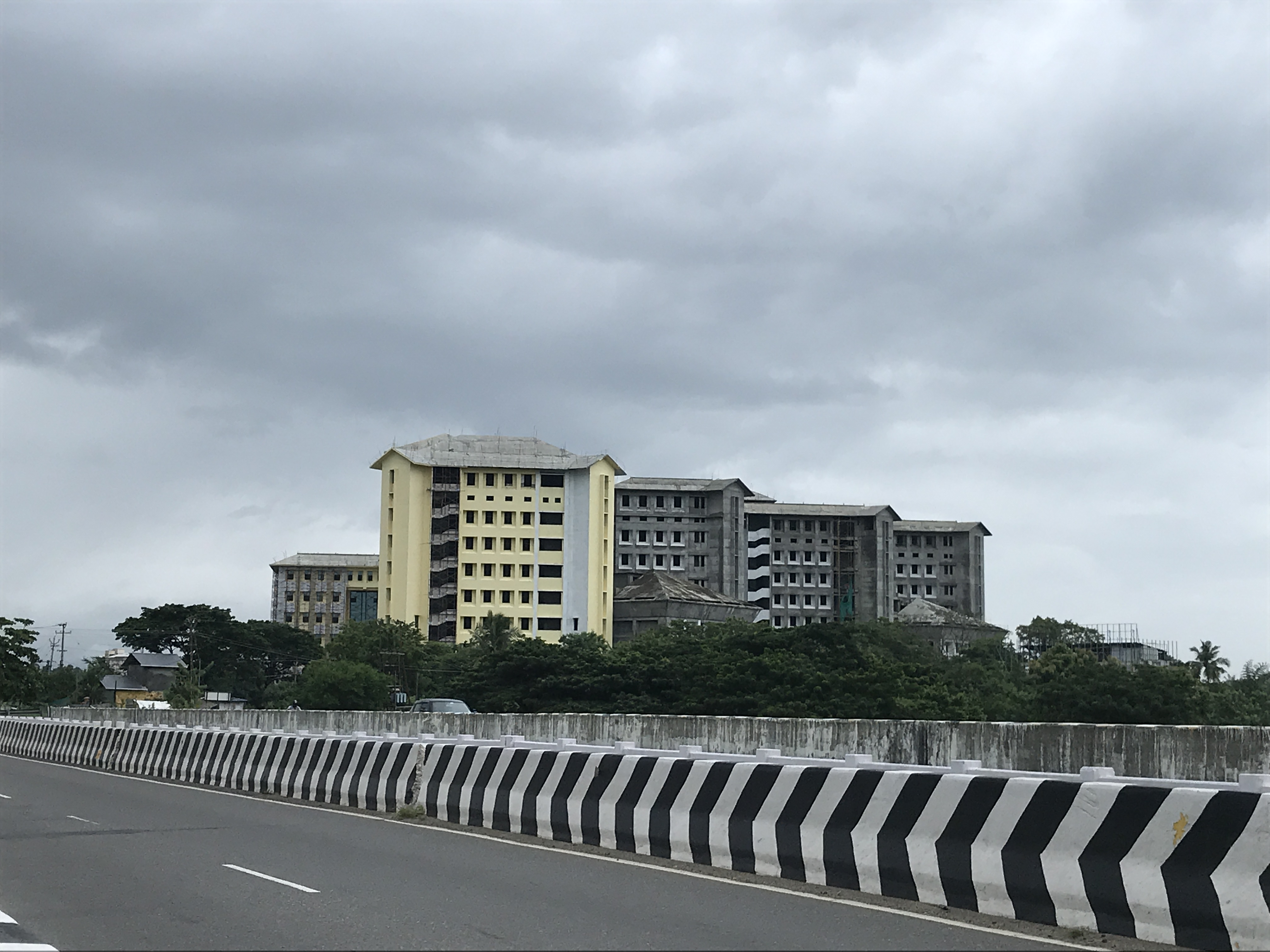
National Highway 544 near Yakkara, Palakkad Medical College at the background

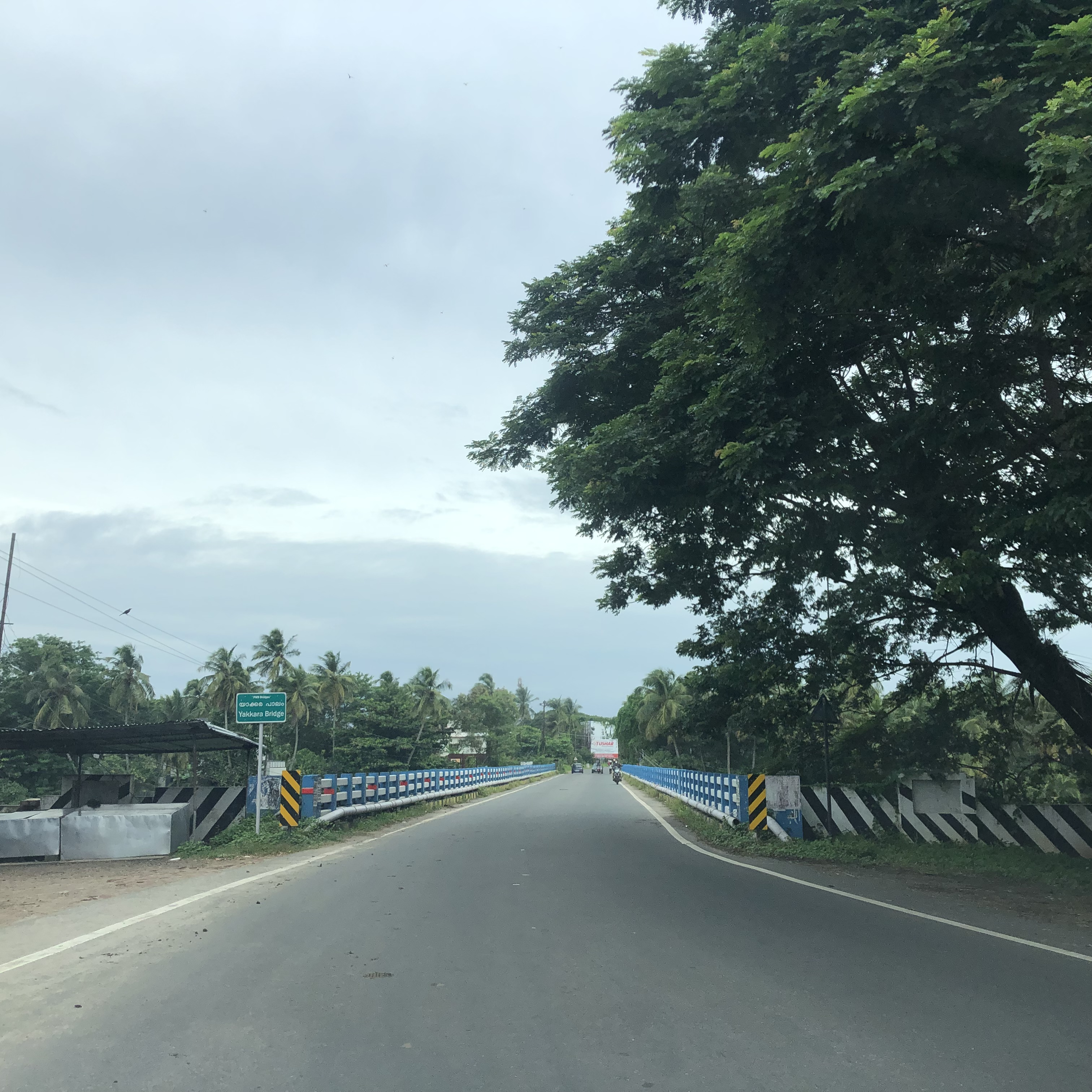
Road Bridge over River Yakkara

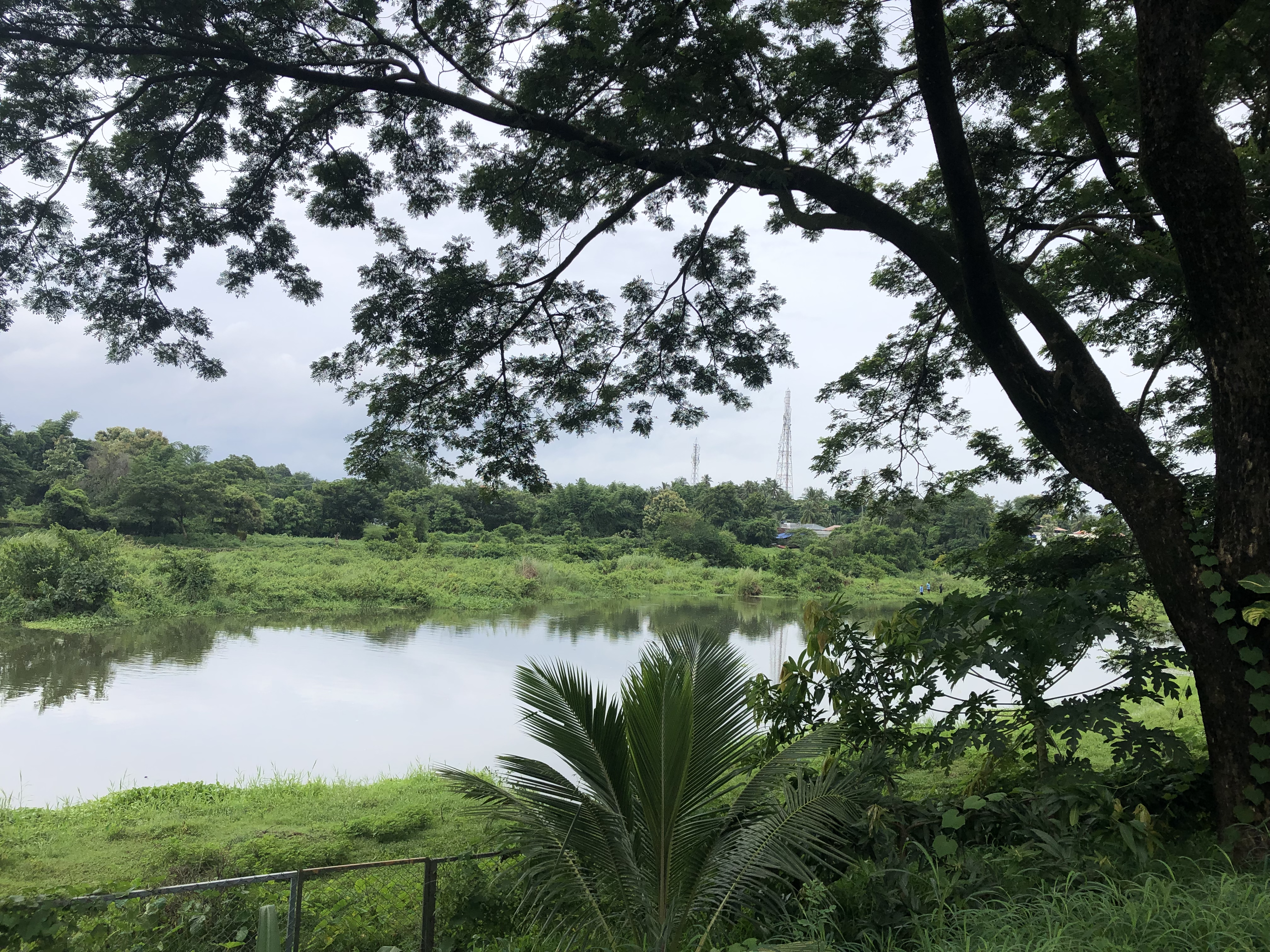
Yakkara Riverside view

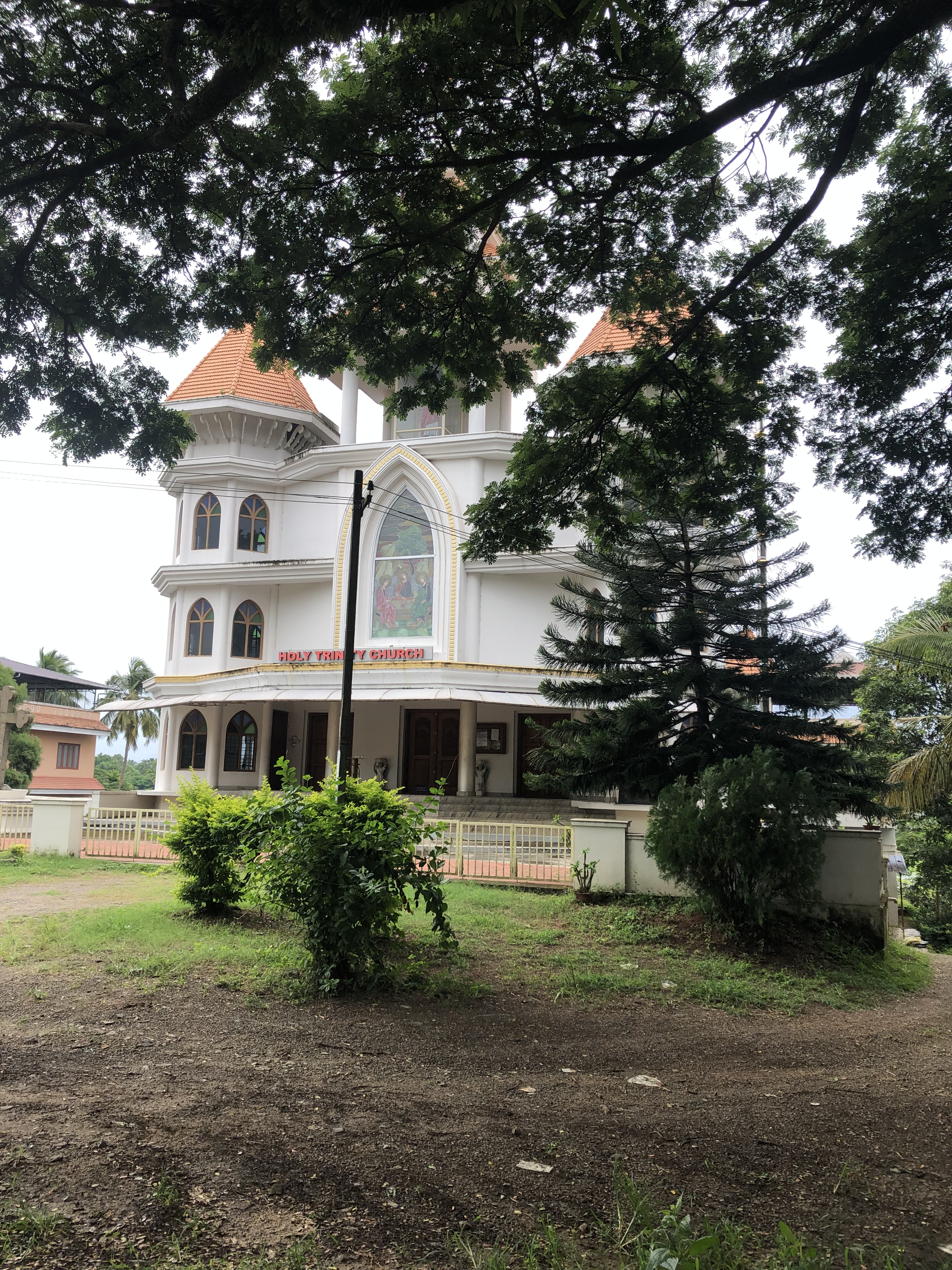
Holy Trinity Church, near Yakkara Puzhakkal

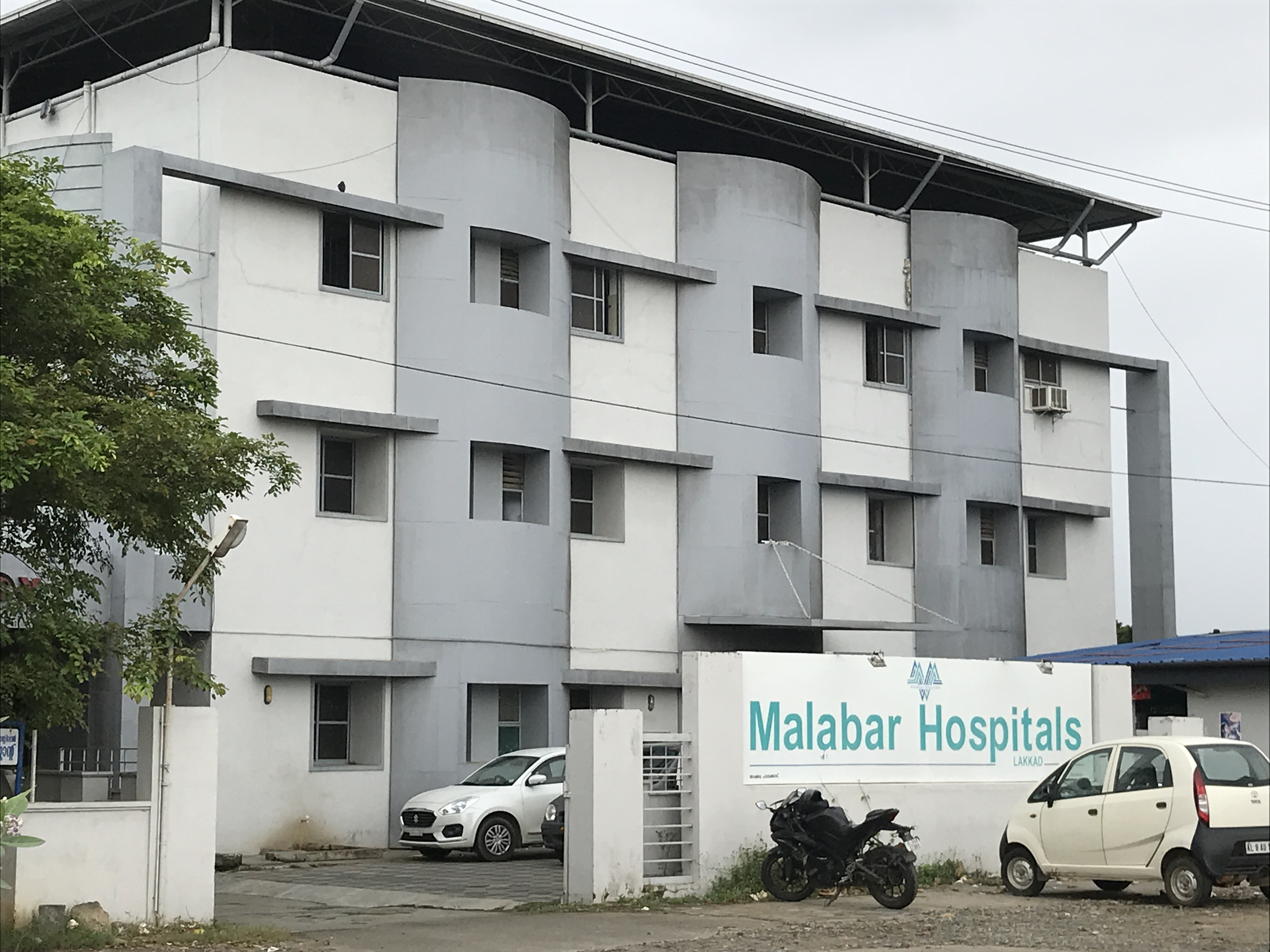
Malabar Hospital
