= 2014 Union budget of India =

Government budget

- Emblem of India
- Submitted: 10 July 2014
- Submitted by: Arun Jaitley, Finance Minister
- Party: Bharatiya Janata Party
- Website: www.indiabudget.gov.in

The 2014 Union Budget of India was presented by Finance Minister, Arun Jaitley on 10 July 2014,11 am. This was the first budget of the Narendra Modi led NDA government.

== Highlights ==
- ₹70.6 billion (US$730 million) provided for the development of Smart Cities in India
- ₹10 billion (US$100 million) provided for irrigation
- 5 New IITs and IIMs and four new AIIMS in India.
- New airports scheme in tier 1 and 2 cities
- Schemes for development of sports across the country.

=== Foreign Direct Investment ===
- FDI cap in Defense and Insurance sector was increased to 49% from 26%.
- FDI in real estate for low cost housing

=== Personal tax and exemption limit ===
- No changes in personal income tax slabs. But tax exemption limit has been increased to ₹250,000 (US$2,600) from ₹200,000 (US$2,100) for those below the age of 60. Income tax exemption limit for senior citizens has been raised to ₹300,000 (US$3,100).
- Investment limit under Section 80C has also been increased to ₹150,000 (US$1,600) from the current ₹100,000 (US$1,000).
- Housing loan interest rate deduction limit has been increased to ₹200,000 (US$2,100).

== Reactions ==
The budget received largely negative reactions, with former Prime Minister Manmohan Singh saying that it "lacks road-maps," the Communist Party of India (Marxist) calling it "a recipe for further enriching the rich and impoverishing the poor," and former Chief Minister of Delhi Arvind Kejriwal stating that "it was a directionless budget with no steps to bring down inflation in the country," although president of CII Ajay S. Shriram said that it "covered many aspects of the population" and offered a "positive direction for higher economic growth."

== See also ==
- Union budget of India
- Railway Budget
