= Vennakkara =

- Suburb
- Location in Kerala, India Vennakkara (India)
- Coordinates: 10°49′N 76°39′E
- Country: India
- State: Kerala
- District: Palakkad

Government
  - Body: Palakkad Municipality

Languages
  - Official: Malayalam, English
- Time zone: UTC+5:30 (IST)
- PIN: 678 004
- Telephone code: 0491
- Vehicle registration: KL-09
- Parliament constituency: Palakkad
- Assembly constituency: Palakkad

Vennakkara is an area in Palakkad city, Kerala, India. It is located about 5 km (3.1 mi) from the city centre. Vennakkara is wards 32 and 33 of Palakkad Municipality.
