= Pudussery Gram Panchayat =

Gram panchayat in Palakkad district, Kerala, India

Pudussery is a gram panchayat in the Palakkad district, state of Kerala, India. It is a local government organisation that serves the towns of Kanjikode, Pudussery Central, Pudussery West and Walayar. Kerala's first IIT and the second largest industrial area in Kerala is located in this panchayat.
