= Thirunellai =

Thirunellai Thirunellayi, Thiruvillakadavu
- Suburb
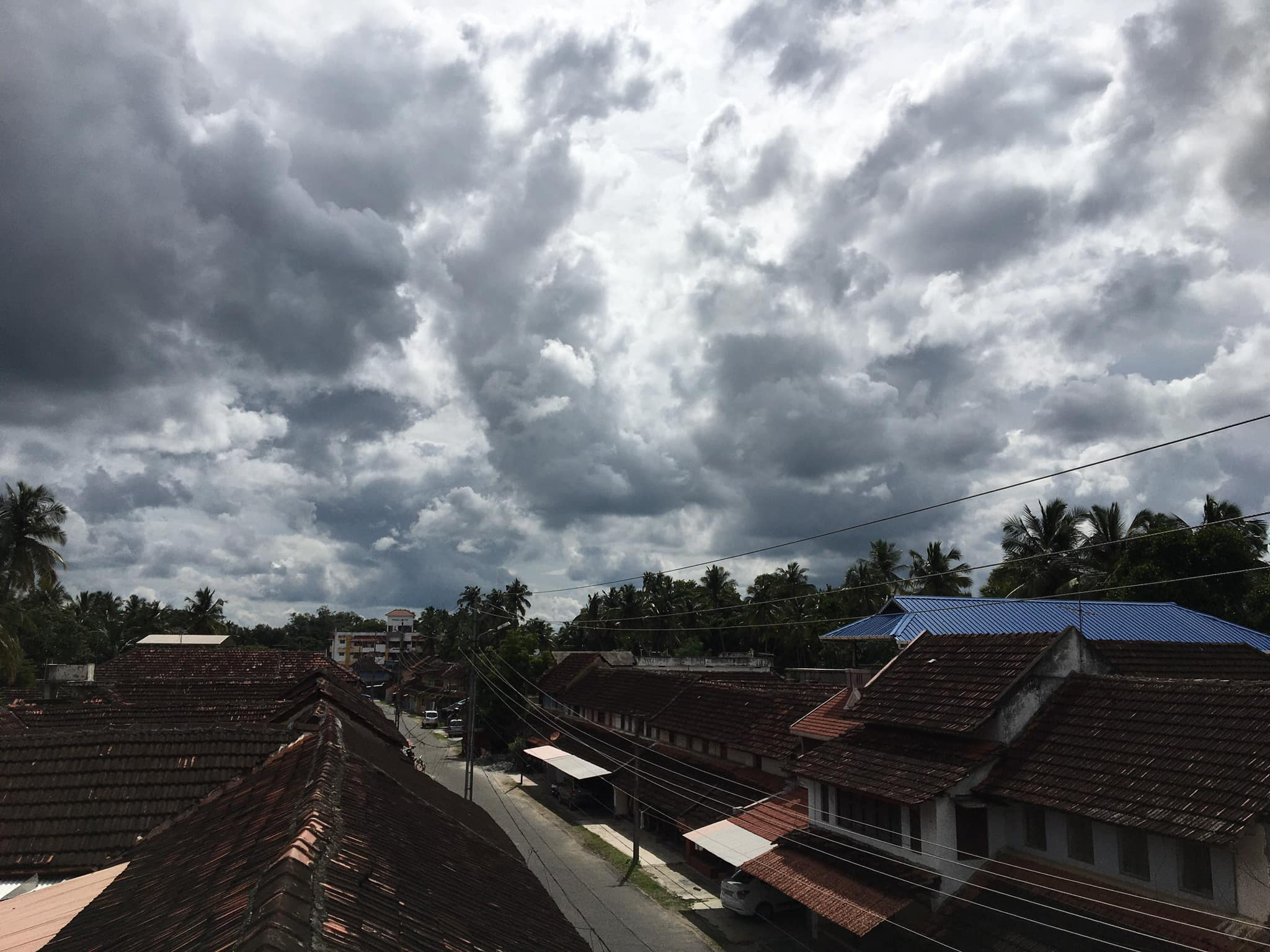
- Thirunellai Agraharam

- Location in Kerala, India Thirunellai (India)
- Coordinates: 10.76°N 76.62°E
- Country: India
- State: Kerala
- District: Palakkad

Government
  - Body: Palakkad Municipality

Languages
  - Official: Malayalam, English
- Time zone: UTC+5:30 (IST)
- PIN: 678020
- Telephone code: 0491
- Vehicle registration: KL-09
- Nearest city: Palakkad
- Literacy: 95%
- Lok Sabha constituency: Palakkad
- Website: www.thirunellayi.2truth.com

Thirunellai (translit=Tirunellāyi) is a residential area in Palakkad district, Kerala, India. It is located on the banks of the Kannadi River and is about five kilometers from the district headquarters. It comes under the Kannadi Panchayath. It is about 4km from Kuzhalmannam.

Thirunellayi is famous for its Tamil Brahmin agraharam (Malayalam: പൈതൃക ഗ്രാമം, romanized: Paitr̥ka Grāmaṁ, lit. 'Heritage Village'). Thirunellayi comprises wards 35 and 36 of Palakkad Municipality.

== Gallery ==
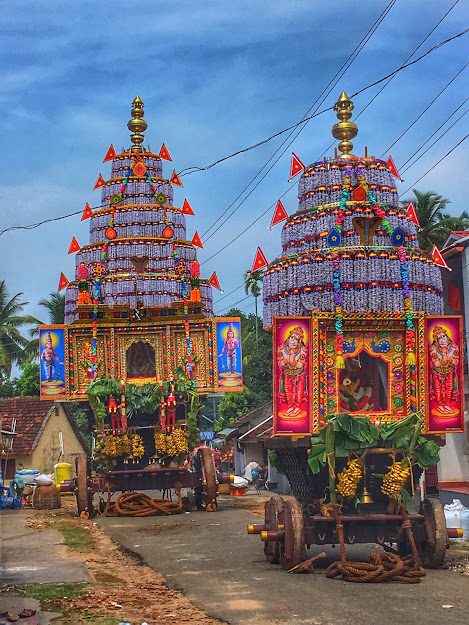
Temple Cars-Thirunellai

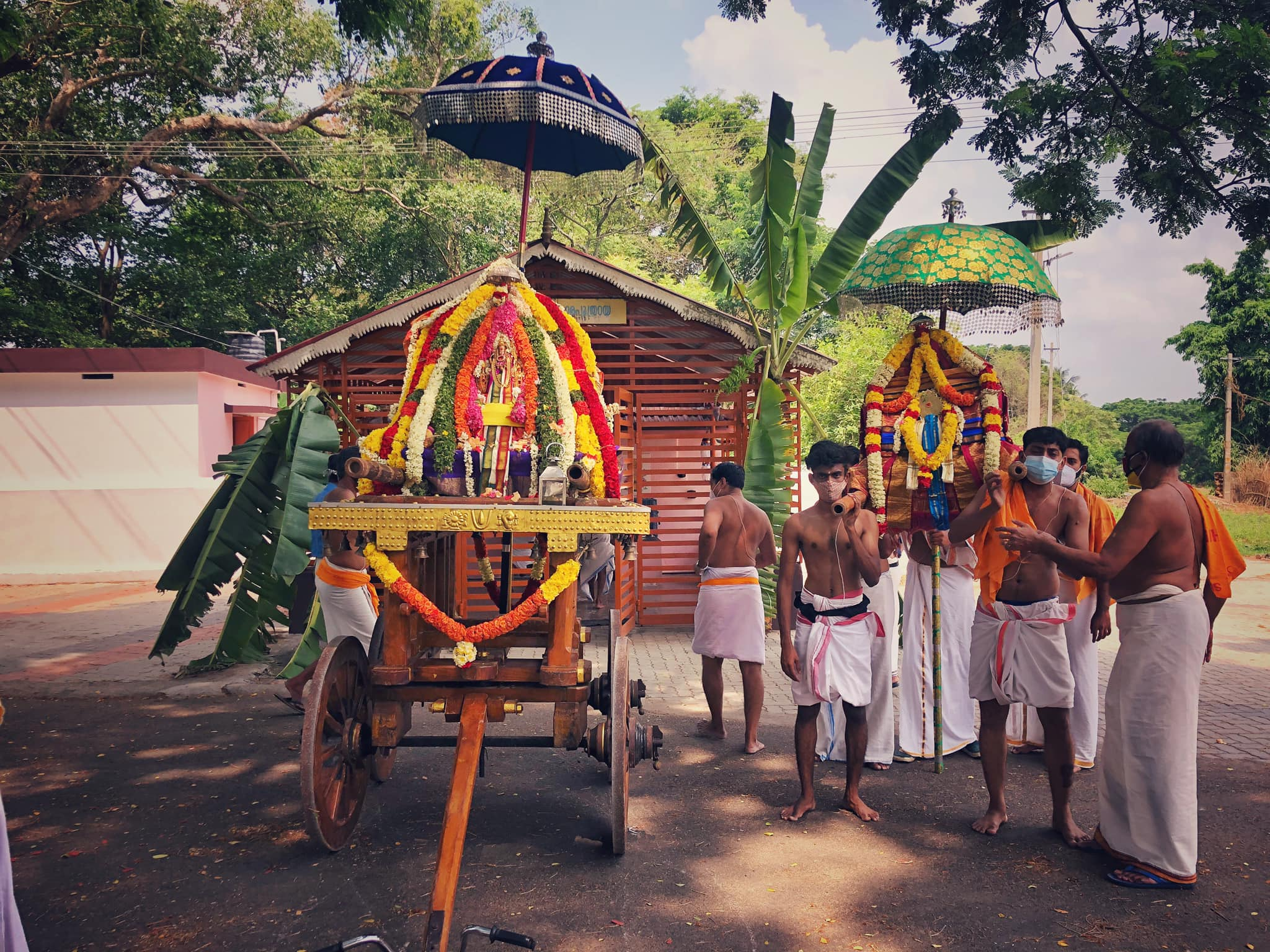
Thirunellai ratholsavam 2021

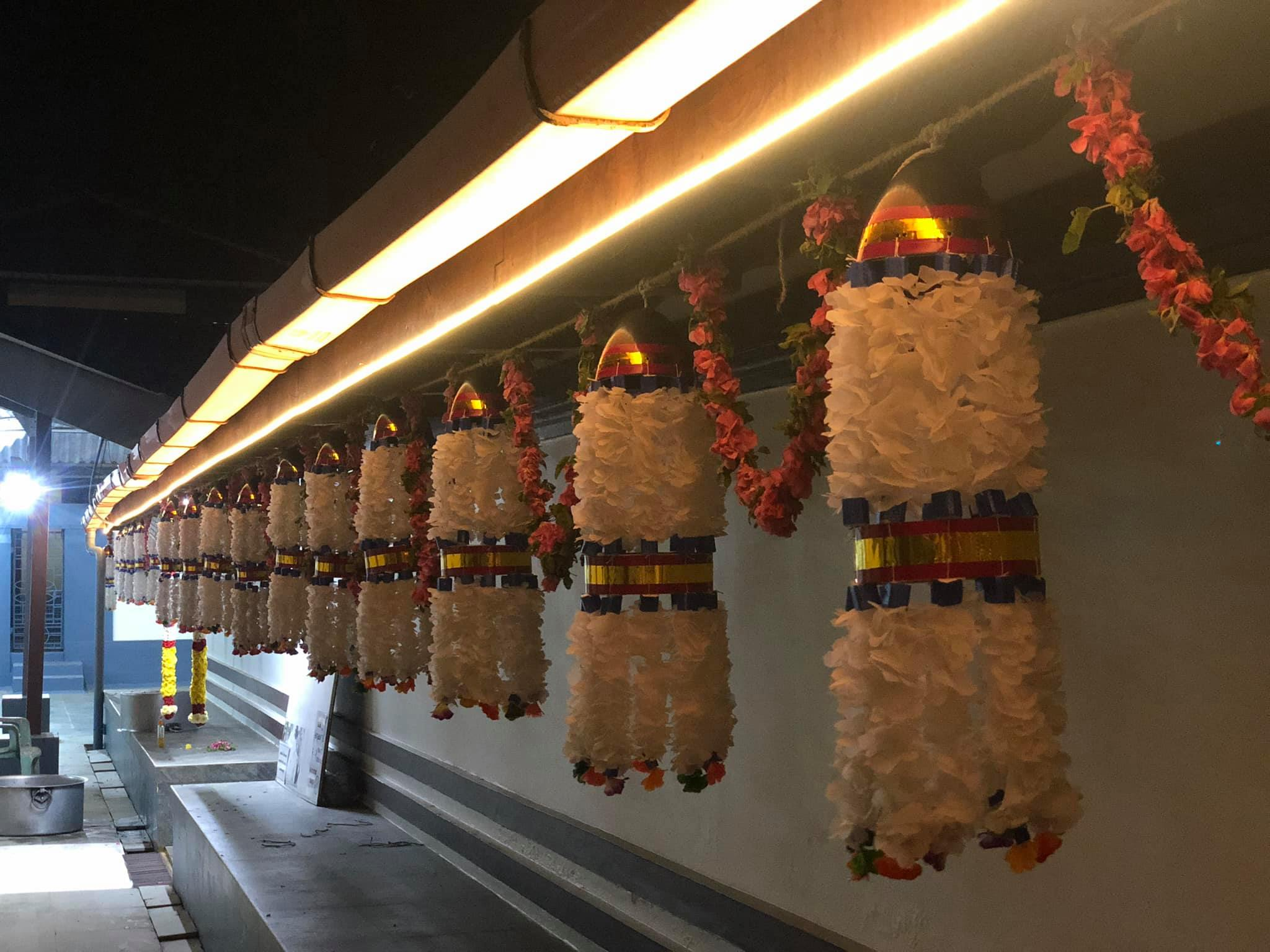
Brahmotsavam Thirunellai 2021

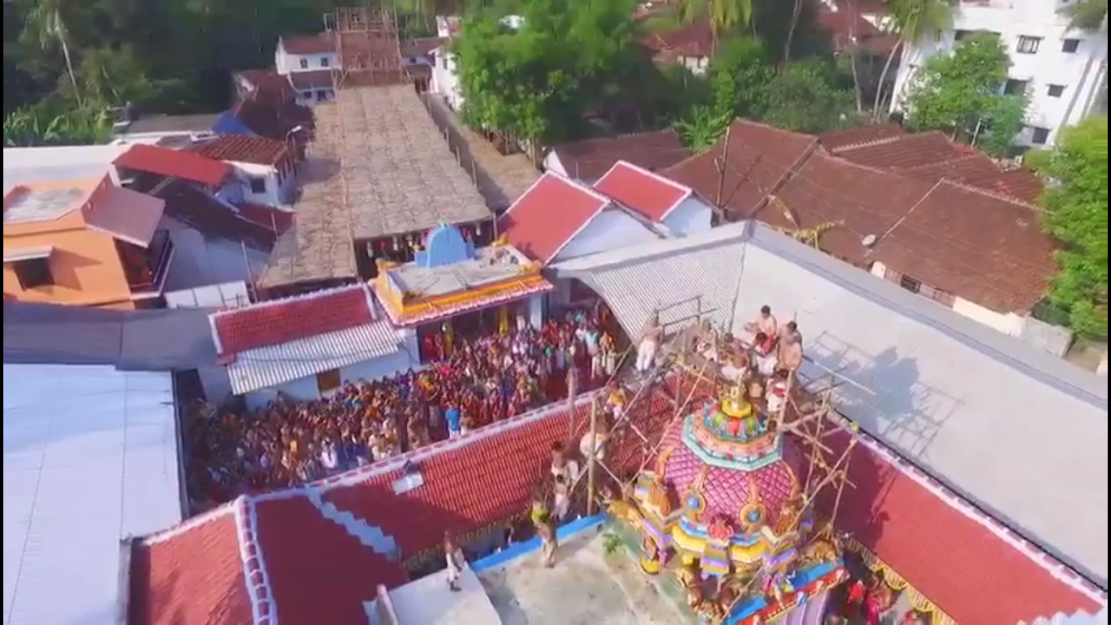
Kumbhabhishekam Thirunellai 2017
