= Pudussery West =

- Census Town
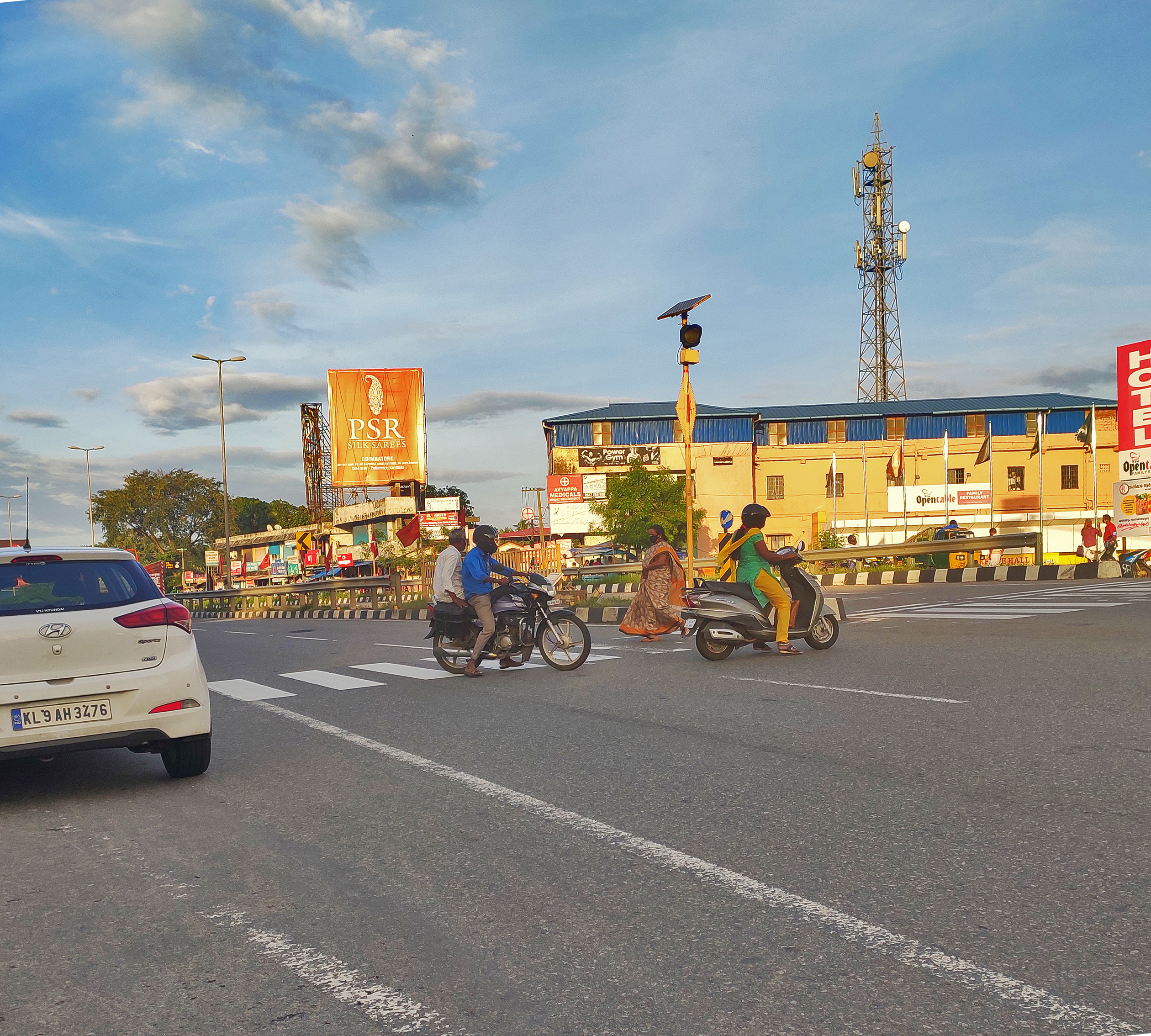
- Pudussery West

- Location in Kerala, India Pudussery West (India)
- Country: India
- State: Kerala
- District: Palakkad

Government
  - Body: Pudussery Panchayat

Population (2011)
  - Total: 20,140

Languages
  - Official: Malayalam, English
- Time zone: UTC+5:30 (IST)
- PIN: 678623
- Vehicle registration: KL-09

Pudussery West is a census town in the Palakkad district, state of Kerala, India. Pudussery West comes under the administration of the Pudusseri gram panchayat.

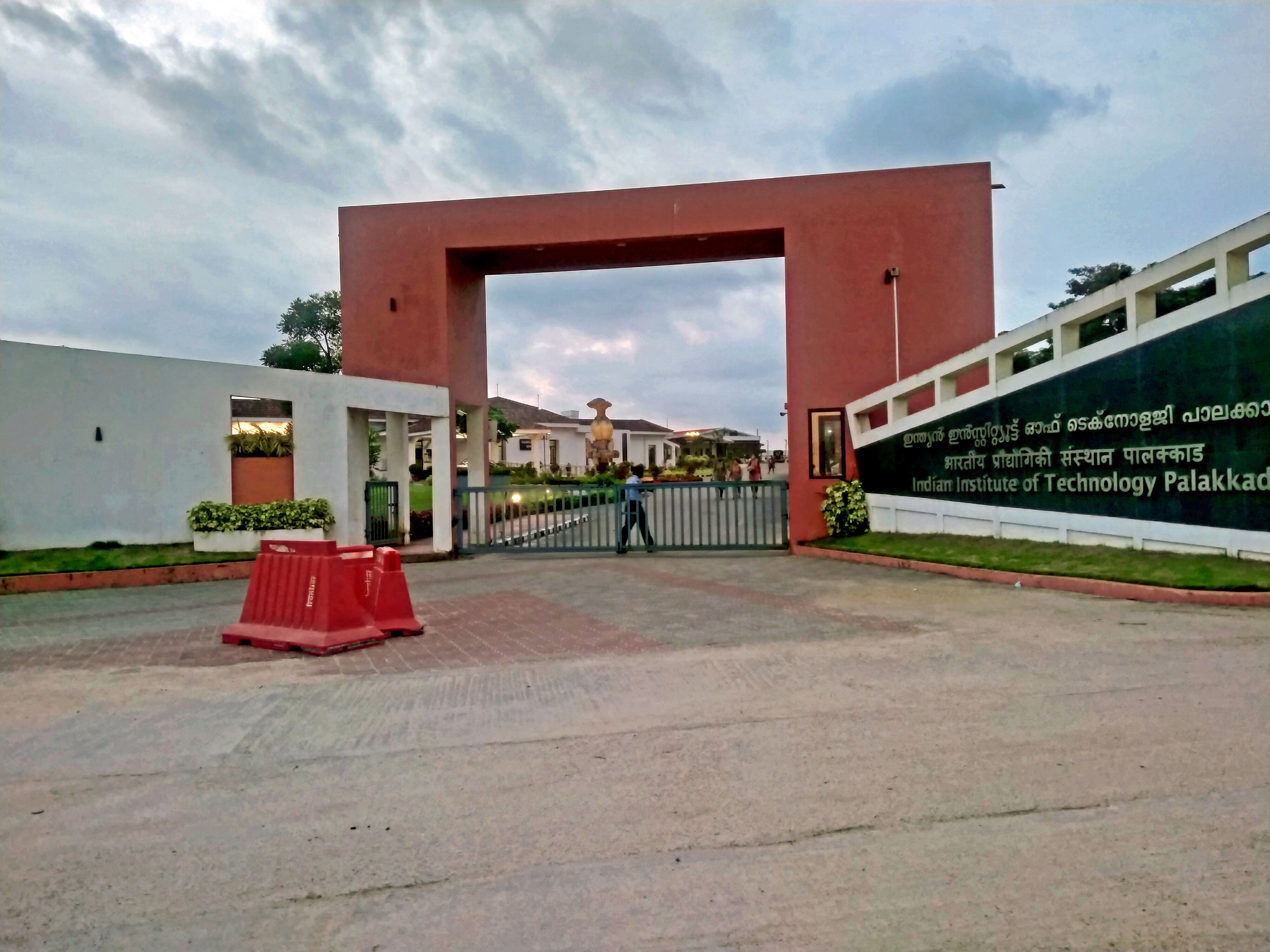
IIT Palakkad main Entrance

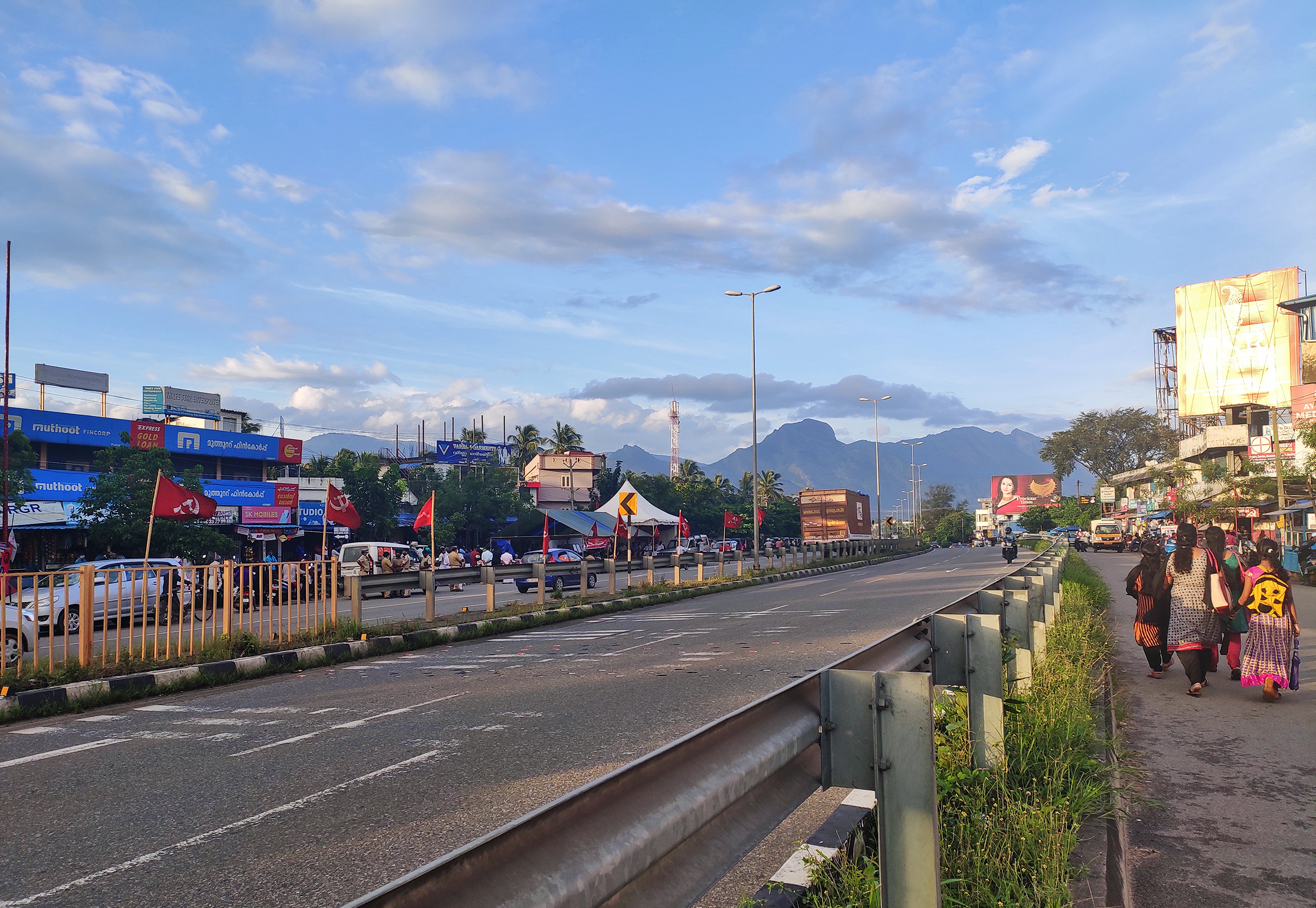
NH 544, Pudussery

== Demographics ==
According to 2011 Indian census, there are 20,140 people living in Pudussery town, with 9,948 men and 10,192 women. Additionally, Pudussery West has a child sex ratio of about 1005, which is higher than the Kerala state average of 964. Pudussery West has an 88.51% literacy rate, with a male literacy rate of approximately 92.44% and a female literacy rate of 84.67%. Pudussery West Census Town provides basic utilities including water and sewage to more than 5,016 homes.
