= Pudussery Central =

- Census Town
- Location in Kerala, India Pudussery Central (India)
- Coordinates: 10.672691°N 76.753138°E
- Country: India
- State: Kerala
- District: Palakkad

Population (2011)
  - Total: 16,629

Languages
  - Official: Malayalam, English
- Time zone: UTC+5:30 (IST)
- PIN: 678621
- Vehicle registration: KL-09

Pudussery Central is a census town in Palakkad district in the state of Kerala, India. Pudussery Central comes under the administration of the Pudusseri gram panchayat.

== Demographics ==
As of 2011 India census, Pudussery Central had a population of 16,629 with 8,469 males and 8,160 females.
