= Koottanad =

Koottanad Kuttanad
- town
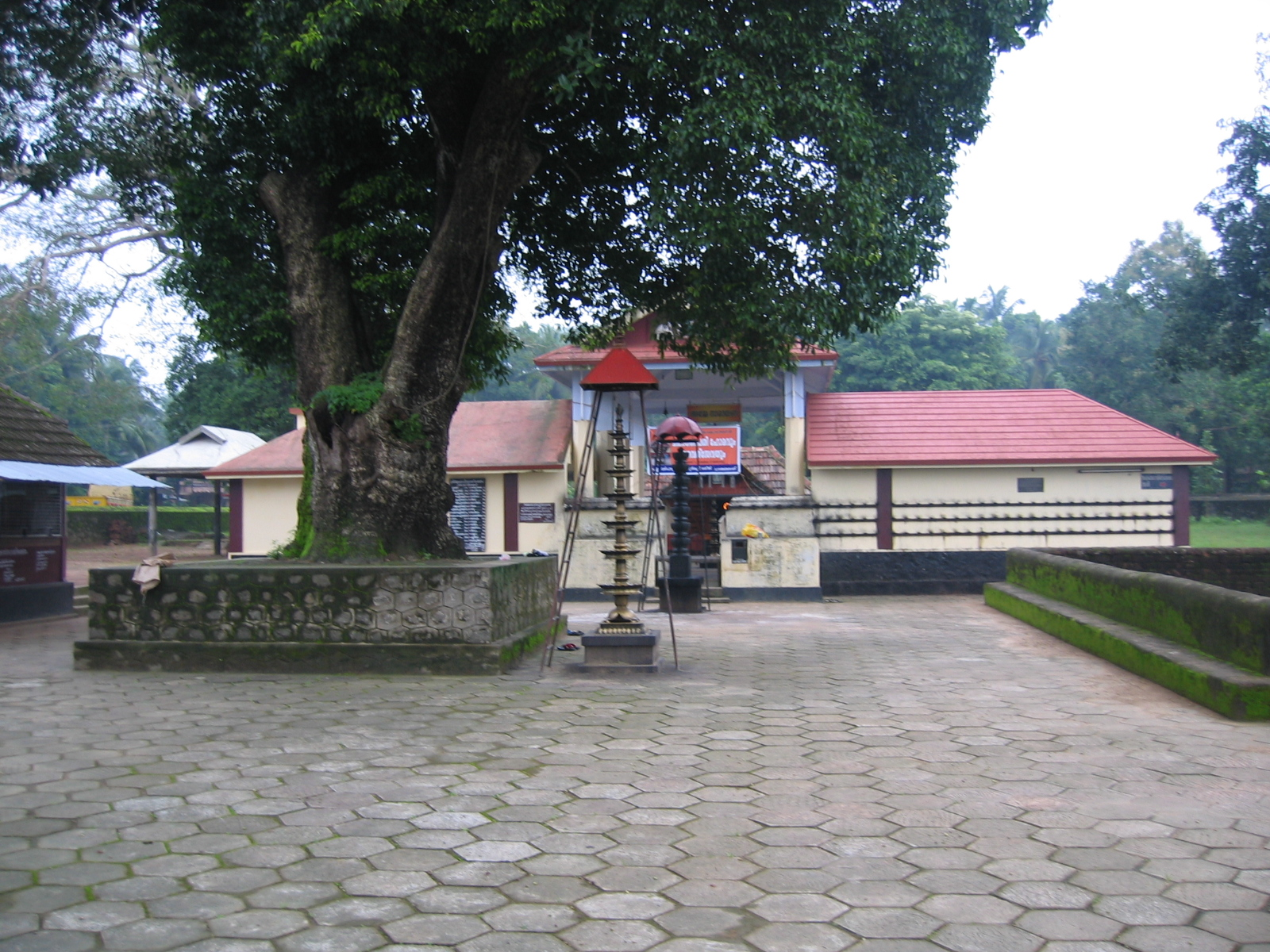
- Amakkavu Temple

- Location in Kerala, India
- Coordinates: 10°45′40.56″N 76°7′15.41″E
- Country: India
- State: Kerala
- District: Palakkad

Government
  - Body: Nagalassery Panchayath
  - Density: 889/km^{2} (2,300/sq mi)

Languages
  - Official: Malayalam, English
- Time zone: UTC+5:30 (IST)
- PIN: 679533
- Telephone code: 91-(0)662-XXX XXXX
- Nearest city: Pattambi
- Sex ratio: 1.091 ♂/♀
- Literacy: 84.76%
- Lok Sabha constituency: Ponnani
- Vidhan Sabha constituency: Thrithala
- Civic agency: Nagalassery Panchayath
- Website: www.koottanad.com

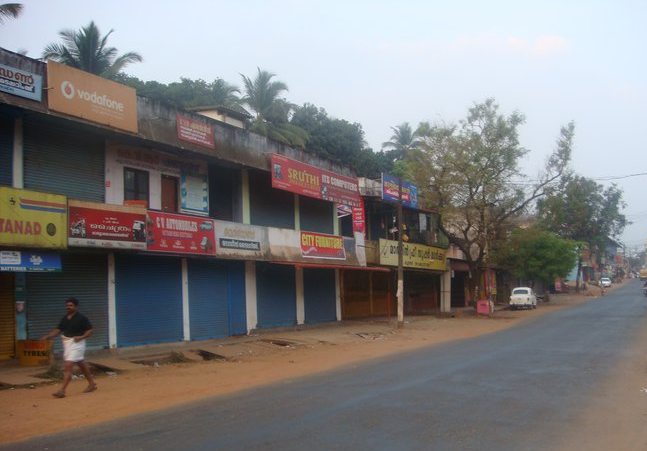
Koottanad-Pattambi Road: An Early Morning View.

Koottanad is a town in Nagalassery Panchayath of Pattambi taluk of Palakkad district, in the state of Kerala. It is situated at the border of Thrissur, Palakkad and Malapuram districts. It is located 32 km from the Thrissur and 65 km from Palakkad, on the road between Guruvayoor and Palakkad. It is connected by road to other parts of Kerala and the nearest Railway station is Pattambi 9 km away. Bharathapuzha Nila Riverflows through Thrithala, 5 km away. The Pakkanar Memorial, a tribute to the Pariah saint of Parayi petta panthirukulam can be found at Thrithala. The Kattil Madam Temple, a small granite Buddhist monument on the Pattambi-Guruvayoor road, is of great archaeological importance. It is believed to date back to the 9th/10th century AD. The debris of a Fort (Tipu Sultan Fort) can be seen behind Juma Mazjid, Koottanad between Koottanad and Chalissery Road.

== Location ==
Koottanad is a junction of two major roads Palakkad -Guruvayoor and Palakkad-Ponnani state highway. It is located 65 km from the city of Palakkad and 25 km from Guruvayoor. The main roads from Koottanad are Kunnamkulam/Guruvayoor Road, Pattambi/Palakad Road, Edappal/Ponani Road, Peringodu Road and Thrithala/Kuttipuram Road.

== Religious ==
The population consists of mainly Hindus and Muslims.

=== Festivals ===
- Koottanad Nercha
- Elavathukkal Pooram
- Amakkavu Pooram

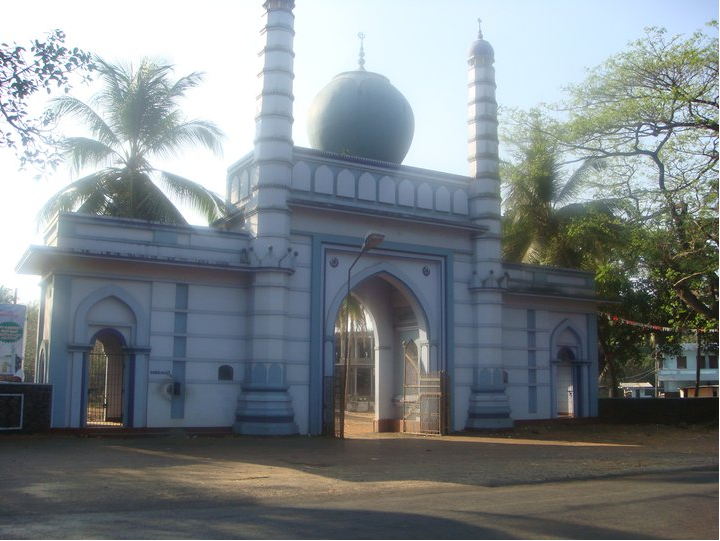
Koottanad Juma musjid Gate.

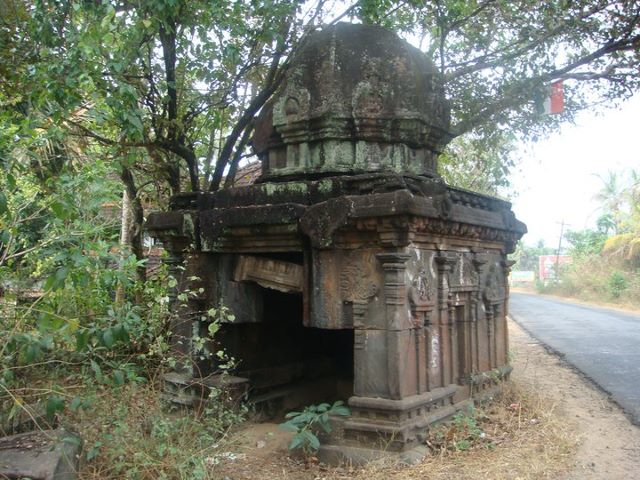
The Kattilmadam Temple: It is believed to date back to the 9th/10th century AD.

== Political ==
It comes under the Thrithala block with VT Balram as the Legislative Assembly representative, while assembly constituency is part of Ponnani (Lok Sabha Constituency) Mr. Abul Samad Samsfani is representative. Earlier it was part of Ottapalam Constituency Parliament.

== Geography and climate ==
Koottanad has similar climatic conditions prevalent elsewhere the state: a dry season from December through February, a hot season from March through May; the Southwest Monsoon from June through September and the North East Monsoon from October through November. The South West Monsoon is usually very heavy and is responsible for nearly 75% of the annual rainfall. The dry season is generally hot and humid, with temperature varying between 22 °C and 35 °C. The average annual rainfall is 2800 mm. It is a hilly region with herbs, fruits, valleys, lake and brooks.

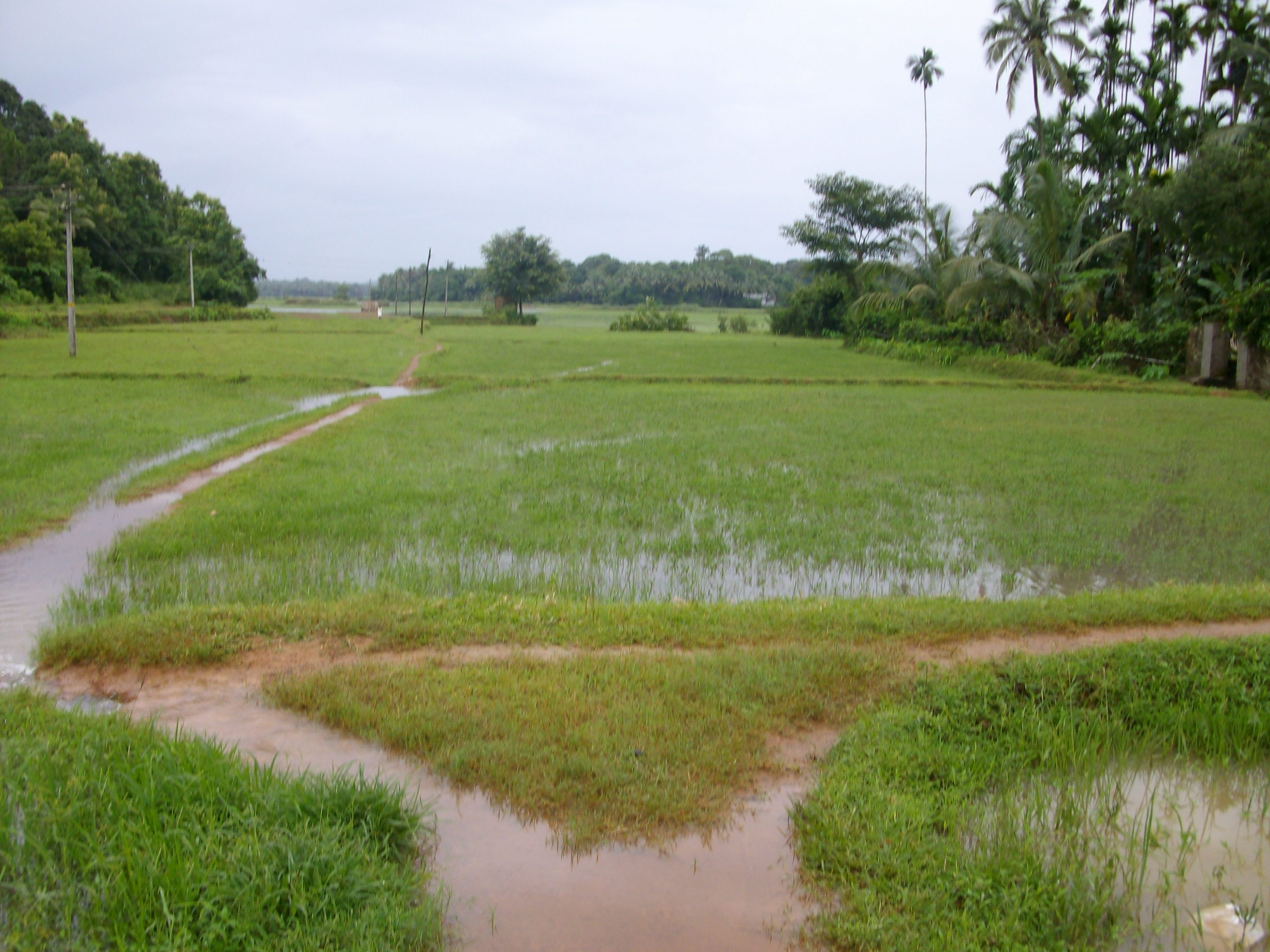
A Paddy fields in Koottanad (Vattenad).

== Transportation ==
Airports : Kozhikode's Calicut International Airport and Kochi's Cochin International Airport are at almost the same distance from Koottanad (about a two-hour drive). While Coimbatore Airport in Tamil Nadu state is about 125 km (78 mi) away.

Railways : The nearest railway stations are Pattambi (8 km), Kuttipuram (15 km) and Shoranur Junction (20 km).

Roads : Koottanad is located actually between two major state high ways. state Highway (SH 39) Guruvayoor - Palakkad and Thrithala Main Road connecting Ponnani-Palakkad Highway. The new bridge ( Velliyankallu bridge ) connecting Valanchery reduces the distance from Thrissur to Kozhikode by 11 km (7 mi).

Buses : All major long-route buses stop at Koottanad Junction.

Local Transport : Taxi's (Auto-rickshaws, Cars..etc.) are available at every road and at all major junctions they have their slots. Smaller buses ply on regular intervals to the internal locations, as there are narrow roads.

== Education ==
- Govt. Vocational Higher Secondary School-Vattenad
- Govt. Higher Secondary School- Mezhathur
- Govt. Higher Secondary School- Chalissery
- Govt. Higher Secondary School- Chathanur
- Higher Secondary School - Peringodu
- Govt. H.S - Nagalassery ( Vavanoor )
- SIMAT Engineering College – Vavanoor
- Royal College of Engineering - Akkikkavu
- Al Ameen Engineering College - Kulappully
- Royal Dental college - Chalissery

Ashtamgam Ayurvedam Chikitsalayam Vidyapeetham - Vavanoor

== Notable residents ==
- V. T. Bhattathiripad, Dramatist and a prominent freedom fighter
- M. T. Vasudevan Nair, Malayalam Writer
- Kuttimalu Amma (Ammu Swaminathan), Courageous freedom fighter and a prominent leader
- Major Ravi, Malayalam film director
- Captain Lakshmi Sahgal, Activist of the Indian independence movement
- Maha kavi Akkitham Achuthan Namboothiri
- E. Sreedharan-Former Managing Director of DMRC
- Sudevan -Malayalam film director, film CR No: 89

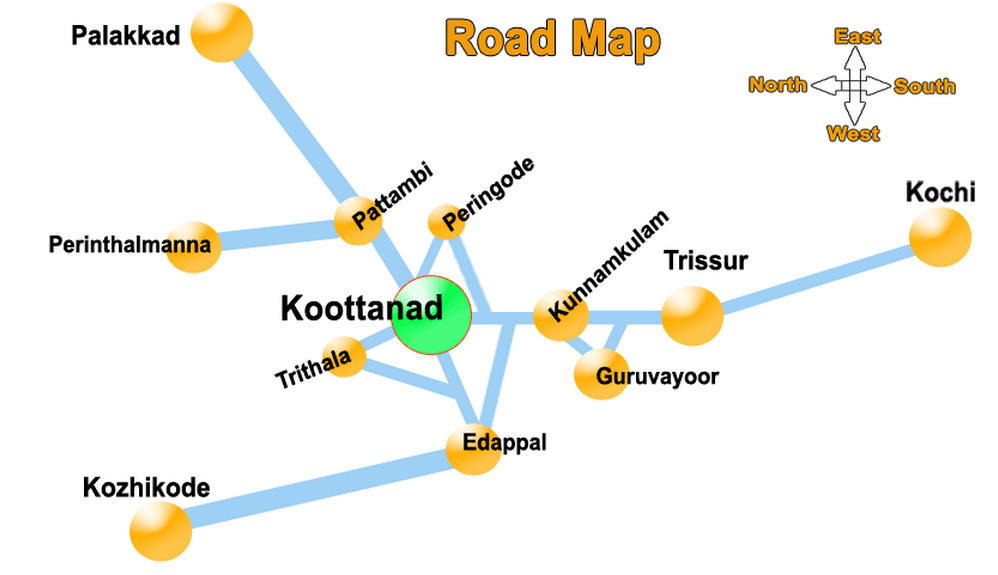
