= Karukaputhur =

- Village
- Location in Kerala, India Karukaputhur (India)
- Coordinates: 10°44′00.1″N 76°9′37.1″E
- Country: India
- State: Kerala
- District: Palakkad

Languages
  - Official: Malayalam, English
- Time zone: UTC+5:30 (IST)
- Telephone code: 04662
- Vehicle registration: KL-52
- Nearest city: Pattambi, Koottanad
- Lok Sabha constituency: Ponnani

Karukaputhur also spell as Karukaputhoor, is a place on the Pattambi taluk, Palakkad district of Kerala. This area part of the Thrithala legislative assembly and Thirumittacode Panchayath. It is a fast growing semi-urban centre in the eastern part of Palakkad district which is nearer to Thrissur town than Palakkad town.

== Transportation ==
Private buses are the main mode of mass transportation in Karukaputhur.Pattambi is the major town near by Karukaputhoor.Private bus operators ply their buses through th Pattambi and Nelluvay. The other major semi urban centers near Karukaputhur are Kootanad and Challissery. Karukaputhur is also the nodal point for transportation for Pattambi towards the North, Shoranur, Nelluvay towards the East, Peringode, Chalissery towards the West and the border villages of Trissur district. Its proximity to Trissur district is one of the important factors of this small towns booming growth in recent years.

== Religious Centres ==
- Narasimhamurthy Temple

Karukaputhur Ekadasi festival is observed annually in Makaram month at the Karukaputhur Sree Narasimha Moorthy Temple. The shrine is located at Karukaputhur in Palakkad District. The temple is around 12 km from Pattambi. Karukaputhur Sree Narasimha Moorthy Temple Ekadasi 2018 date is January 28.This ancient shrine is dedicated to the Narasimha Avatar of Vishnu.The Ekadasi is observed on the Shukla Paksha Ekadasi day in Makaram month.

Special rituals are observed on the day in this ancient shrine. The temple is decorated traditionally with flowers, leaves, coconut fronds, banana leaves and plantain. The ekadasi is observed after the Amavasya in Makaram month. (Shukla Paksha Ekadasi in Makaram month).

- Karukaputhur Juma Masjid

The famous Karukaputhur Nercha is observed during February of every year. This is also called Karukaputhur Odambulli Jaram Chandanakudam Nercha. This is one of the oldest nercha festivals that occur in Kerala and is of almost 120 years old.

== Major Institutions ==
=== Educational ===
- GHSS Chathanur
- GLPS Chathanur
- AUPS Chazhiyattiri
- GLPS Akilanam
- GLPS Pallippadam
- IG English Medium School
- MES Karukaputhur
- Jaya College Chathanur
- Masters Study Centre Chathanur
- Oxygen Chathannur

=== Financial ===
- Punjab National Bank - Thirumittacode Branch
- Federal Bank - Karukaputhur Branch
- Muthoot Finance - Karukaputhur

=== Notable Personalities ===
- E Sreedharan - Metro man
- Kalamandalam Chandran
- Kalamandalam Geethanandan
- Peringode Vijayan
- Vijayan Chathannur
- Achuthanandan V Peringode
