= Thrithala Assembly constituency =

Constituency of the Kerala legislative assembly in India

Thrithala
- Constituency No. 49 for the Kerala Legislative Assembly
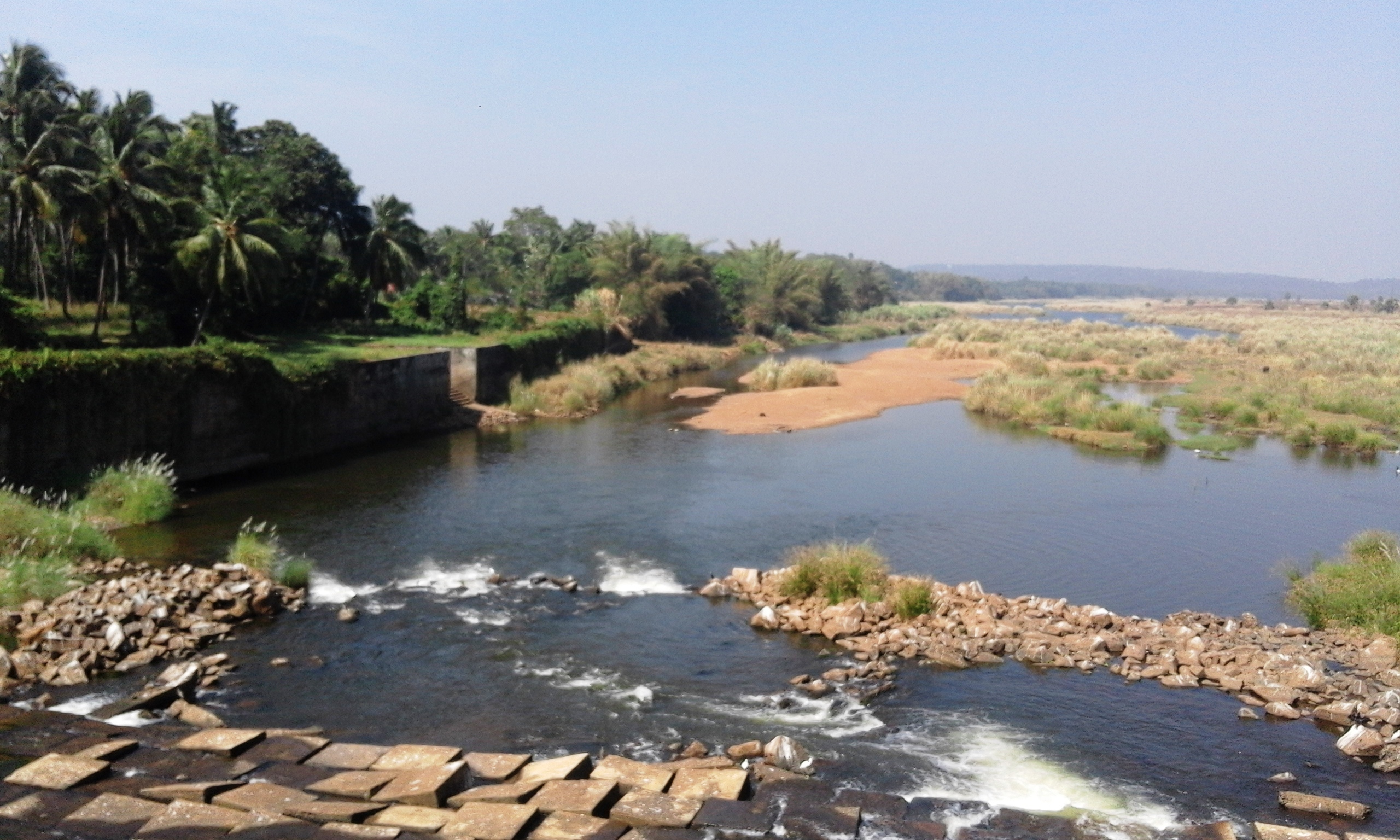
- Thrithala Veliyamkallu Bridge in Thrithala Assembly constituency

Constituency details
- Country: India
- Region: South India
- State: Kerala
- District: Palakkad
- Established: 1951
- Total electors: 1,94,108 (2021)
- Reservation: None

Member of Legislative Assembly
- 16th Kerala Legislative Assembly
- Incumbent V. T. Balram
- Party: Indian National Congress
- Elected year: 2026

Thrithala State assembly constituency is one Aof the 140 state legislative assembly constituencies in Kerala in southern India. It is one of the two assembly constituencies included in Pattambi Taluk, Palakkad District. It is also one of the seven state legislative assembly constituencies included in Ponnani Lok Sabha constituency. As of the 2026 Assembly elections, the current MLA is V. T. Balram of Indian National Congress.

== Local self-governed segments ==
Thrithala Assembly constituency is composed of the following local self-governed segments:

Sl no.	Name	Status (Grama panchayat/Municipality)	Taluk
1	Anakkara	Grama panchayat	Pattambi
2	Chalissery	Grama panchayat	Pattambi
3	Kappur	Grama panchayat	Pattambi
4	Nagalassery	Grama panchayat	Pattambi
5	Parudur	Grama panchayat	Pattambi
6	Pattithara	Grama panchayat	Pattambi
7	Thirumittacode	Grama panchayat	Pattambi
8	Thrithala	Grama panchayat	Pattambi

Thrithala Assembly constituency

== Members of Legislative Assembly ==
The following list contains all members of Kerala Legislative Assembly who have represented Thrithala Assembly constituency during the period of various assemblies:

Year	Member	Political party
1967	E. T. Kunhan	Communist Party of India (Marxist)
1970	Vella Eacharan	Indian National Congress
1977	K. Sankaranarayanan	Indian National Congress
1980	M. P. Thami	Indian National Congress
1982	K. K. Balakrishnan	Indian National Congress
1987	M. P. Thami	Indian National Congress
1991	E. Sankaran	Communist Party of India (Marxist)
1996	V. K. Chandran	Communist Party of India (Marxist)
2001	V. K. Chandran	Communist Party of India (Marxist)
2006	T. P. Kunjunni	Communist Party of India (Marxist)
2011	V. T. Balram	Indian National Congress
2016	V. T. Balram	Indian National Congress
2021	M. B. Rajesh	Communist Party of India (Marxist)
2026	V. T. Balram	Indian National Congress

== Election results ==
Percentage change (±%) denotes the change in the number of votes from the immediate previous election.

=== 2026 ===
There were 2,03,700 registered voters in constituency for the 2026 election.

2026 Kerala Legislative Assembly election: Thrithala
Party	Candidate	Votes	%	±%
INC	V. T. Balram	76,427	47.10	▲3.24
CPI(M)	M. B. Rajesh	68,042	42.00	▼3.84
BJP	V. Unnikrishnan	15,051	9.30	▲0.86
SDPI	Shaheer Chalipram	1,746	1.08	
BSP	Adv. Keerthi Jayanandhan	188	0.12	
Independent	T. T. Balaraman	91	0.06	
Independent	Balaraman	81	0.05	
Independent	Abbas	77	0.05	
Independent	Rajesh	74	0.05	
NOTA	None of the above	409	0.30	▲0.02
Margin of victory		8,385	5.10	▲3.12
Turnout		1,62,186	78.73	▲0.26
INC gain from CPI(M)		Swing	▲3.24	

=== 2021 ===
There were 1,94,108 registered voters in constituency for the 2021 election.

2021 Kerala Legislative Assembly election: Thrithala
Party	Candidate	Votes	%	±%
CPI(M)	M. B. Rajesh	69,814	45.84%	▲6.16
INC	V. T. Balram	66,798	43.86%	▼3.30
BJP	Sanku T. Das	12,851	8.44%	▼1.85
SDPI	M. K. Abdul Nasar	1,582	1.04%	▲0.11
NOTA	None of the above	427	0.28%	−
BSP	Rajagopal Thrithala	333	0.22%	▼0.04
Margin of victory		3,016	1.98%	▼5.50
Turnout		1,52,311	78.47%	▼0.41
CPI(M) gain from INC		Swing	▲6.16	

=== 2016 ===
There were 1,55,638 registered voters in constituency for the 2016 election.

2016 Kerala Legislative Assembly election: Thrithala
Party	Candidate	Votes	%	±%
INC	V. T. Balram	66,505	47.16%	▼0.31
CPI(M)	Subaida Ishac	55,958	39.68%	▼5.07
BJP	V. T. Rema	14,510	10.29%	▲5.46
SDPI	C. P .Mohammedali	1,313	0.93%	▼0.15
Independent	Subaida	1,080	0.77%	−
NOTA	None of the above	549	0.39%	−
PDP	Moideenkutty Pookath	541	0.38%	▼0.10
BSP	Vinod Perumbavoor	366	0.26%	▼0.18
Independent	Balaram	199	0.14%	−
Margin of victory		10,547	7.48%	▲6.41
Turnout		1,41,021	78.88%	▲0.42
INC hold		Swing	▼0.31	

=== 2011 ===
There were 1,78,784 registered voters in the constituency for the 2011 election.

2011 Kerala Legislative Assembly election: Thrithala
Party	Candidate	Votes	%	±%
INC	V. T. Balram	57,848	47.37%	
CPI(M)	P. Mammikutty	54,651	44.75%	
BJP	V. Ramankutty	5,899	4.83%	
SDPI	Baburajan O. T.	1,320	1.08%	
Independent	P. Mammnkutty	902	0.74%	−
PDP	P. Shamsudheen	590	0.48%	−
BSP	Rameshan Perumannur	543	0.44%	−
Independent	K. Balaraman	367	0.30%	−
Margin of victory		3,197	2.62%	
Turnout		1,22,120	78.46%	
INC gain from CPI(M)		Swing		

=== 1952 ===
1952 Madras Legislative Assembly election: Thrithala
Party	Candidate	Votes	%	±%
Socialist	K. B. Menon	14,280	36.96%	
INC	P. K. Moideen Kutty	11,253	29.13%	29.13%
CPI	K. P. Madhava Menon	6,661	17.24%	
IUML	P. Thangal	6,439	16.67%	
Margin of victory		3,027	7.84%	
Turnout		38,633	50.98%	
Registered electors		75,781		
Socialist win (new seat)				

== See also ==
- Thrithala
- Palakkad district
- List of constituencies of the Kerala Legislative Assembly
- 2016 Kerala Legislative Assembly election
