= Premji =

Indian social reformer (1908–1998)

- Born: M. P. Bhatathirippad; 23 September 1908; Ponnani, Madras Presidency, Indian Empire
- Died: 10 August 1998 (aged 89); Thrissur, Kerala, India
- Occupations: Social reformer, writer, actor
- Spouse: Arya Premji (m. 1943)
- Children: KPAC M.P. Premachandran (late); M.P. Neelakandan; Hareendranathan; M.P. Induchoodan; M.P. Sathi
- Awards: National Film Awards; 1989 - Piravi; Kerala State Film Awards; 1989 - Piravi; Filmfare Awards South; 1989 - Piravi

Mullamangalath Parameshwaran Bhattathiripad (23 September 1908 – 10 August 1998), commonly known as M. P. Bhatathirippad or Premji, was a social reformer, cultural leader and actor from Kerala state, India. Premji joined Yogakshema Sabha and worked with V. T. Bhattathiripad, E. M. S. Namboodiripad and his brother M. R. Bhattathiripad in the fight against the casteism and conservatism that existed in the Nambudiri community. Premji was also a noted stage and film actor who won the National Film Award for Best Actor for the film Piravi.

== Biography ==
Premji was born on 23 September 1908 in Vanneri, Malappuram, Kerala. It was a time when Kerala was experiencing a social uprising. The effect of that was visible in Premji's family and life as well. His elder twin brother M. R. Bhattathiripad, popularly known as MRB was a prominent figure in Malayalam professional plays. Premji joined Yogakshema Sabha and worked with V. T. Bhattathiripad, E. M. S. Namboodiripad and MRB in the fight against the casteism and conservatism that existed in the Nambudiri community. Premji got married at the age of 40 to Arya Antharjanam (28 years old) from Karuvat Illam, Kanjany, Trichur, who was a widow since the age of 17. This was when widow-marriages were completely prohibited in Nambudiri community. This was the second widow marriage in the modern Kerala history, after the marriage of his brother MRB with Uma Antharjanam nine years earlier.

Premji started his professional life as a proof editor in Mangalodayam press Thrissur when he was 19. He soon launched his acting career with Adukkalayil Ninnu Arangathakku, a play by eminent dramatist V. T. Bhattathiripad. Later, he acted in various plays: MRB's Marakkudakkullile Mahaanarakam, Moothiringode Bhavathrathan Namboothiripad's Apphante Makal, Cherukad's Nammalonnu and Snehabimbangal and P. R. Warrier's Chavittikkuzhacha Mannu are some of them. He won gold medal from the Government of Kerala for his performance in the play Shah Jahan, produced by Kalakaumudi Nataka Koottayma. He was also awarded a fellowship by the Kerala Sangeetha Nataka Akademi. With his expertise in plays, he ventured into film industry.

He debuted in Minnaminungu and went on to act in about 60 films including Thacholi Othenen, Kunjali Marakkar, Lisa, Yaagam, Uttarayanam and Piravi. He won the National Film Award for Best Actor as well as Kerala State Film Award and also won Filmfare Award for Best Malayalam Actor for his performance as a father in search of his missing son in Piravi (1989), directed by Shaji N. Karun. In addition to the much acclaimed play Ritumathi Premji has 4 collected verses to his credit as well, namely Sapakthni, Nalkalikal, Raktha Sandesam and Premji Padunnu. He died on 10 August 1998, aged 90.

== Awards ==
National Film Awards:

- Best Actor - 1989 - Piravi

Kerala State Film Awards:

- Best Actor - 1989 - Piravi

Filmfare Awards South:

- Filmfare Award for Best Actor - Malayalam - 1989 - Piravi

== Filmography ==
- Piravi (1988) as Chakyar
- Padippura (1989)
- Bhagavan (1986)
- Kochu Themmadi (1986)
- Anu Bandham (1985) as Valiya Nampoothiri
- Mangalam Nerunnu (1984)
- Sreekrishna Parundu (1984)
- Oru Thira Pinneyum Thira (1982)
- Yagam (1982)
- Thrishna (1981) as Sankar Menon
- Sanchari (1981) as Vaidyar
- Sathyam (1980) as Sekharan Nair
- Vilkkanundu Swapnangal (1980) as Sridevi's Valyammavan
- Sandhyaragam (1979)
- Lisa (1978) as Bhavithradan Namputhirippadu
- Aanapappachan (1978)
- Jagadguru Adisankaran (1977)
- Thulavarsham (1976)
- Chennay Valarthiya Kutti (1976)
- Samasya (1976)
- Niramala (1975)
- Utharayanam (1975)
- Thumbolarcha (1974)
- Ponnapurakotta (1973)
- Theerthayathra (1972)
- Sindooracheppu (1970) as Thirumeni
- Othenente Makan (1970) as Thacholi Valiya Kurup
- Mindappennu (1970) as Kittunni Nair
- Kunjali Marakkar (1966) as Zamorin of Calicut
- Pakalkkinavu (1966)
- Thacholi Othenan (1964) as Thacholi Valiya Kurup
- Moodupadam (1963)
- Shymala Chechi (1965)
- Ammu (1965)
- Thira, Veendum Oru Thira
- Minnaminungu (1957)
- Neelakuyil (1954)
