= E. M. S. Namboodiripad bibliography =

Elamkulam Manakkal Sankaran Namboodiripad (13 June 1909 – 19 March 1998), popularly known as EMS, was an Indian communist politician and theorist, who served as the first Chief Minister of Kerala state in 1957–59 and then again in 1967–69. As a member of the Communist Party of India (CPI), he became the first non-Indian National Congress chief minister in the Indian republic. In 1964, he led a faction of the CPI that broke away to form the Communist Party of India (Marxist) (CPI(M)).

This article contains lists of notable works of and on E. M. S. Namboodiripad.

== Notable works in English ==
Sl no.	Title	Year	Publishers	Remark(s)	Reference(s)
1	A Short History of the Peasant Movement in Kerala	1943	Peoples Pub. House, Bombay		
2	National Question in Kerala	1952	Peoples Pub. House, Bombay		
3	Mahatma and His Ism	1958	Leftword Books		
4	Problems of National Integration	1966	National Book Agency, Calcutta		
5	What really happened in Kerala; the story of the disruptive game played by right-wing communists	1966	National Book Agency, Calcutta		
6	Economics and Politics of Indian Socialist Pattern	1966	Peoples Pub. House, New Delhi		
7	Kerala Yesterday, Today and Tomorrow	1967	National Book Agency, Calcutta		
8	India Under Congress Rule	1967	National Book Agency, Calcutta		
9	Conflicts and crisis : political India	1974	Orient Longman		
10	Indian Planning in Crisis	1974	Chintha Publishers		
11	How I Became a Communist	1976	Chintha Publishers		
12	Crisis into chaos: Political India 1981	1981	Sangam Books, Bombay	First published by Orient Longman under the title 'Conflicts and crisis' in 1974.	
13	Selected Writings Vol. I	1982	National Book Agency, Calcutta		
14	Kerala Society and Politics: A Historical Survey	1984	National Book Centre, New Delhi		
15	Selected Writings Vol. II	1985	National Book Agency, Calcutta		
16	A History of Indian Freedom Struggle	1986	Social Scientist Press		
17	Reminiscence of an Indian Communist	1987	National Book Centre, New Delhi		
18	Nehru: Ideology and Practice	1988	National Book Centre, New Delhi		
19	Communist Party in Kerala: Six Decades of Struggle and Advance	1994	National Book Centre, New Delhi		

== Notable works in Malayalam ==
Sl no.	Title	Year	Remark(s)	Reference(s)
1	Jawaharlal Nehru	1931		
2	Rationinginu Sesham Keralathile Pattini	1945		
2	Onnekaal Kodi Malayalikal	1946		
3	Keralam Malayalikalude Mathrubhumi	1948		
4	Keralathile Deshiya Prashnam	1955		
5	Gandhiyum Gandhisavum	1958		
6	Communism Kettippadukkunnavarude Koode	1960		
7	Karl Marx: Puthuyugathinte Vazhikatti	1968		
8	EMS Athmakatha	1969	Won Kerala Sahitya Akademi Award, 1970	
9	Samskarika Viplavam Matham Marxism	1974		
10	Marxisavum Malayala Sahityavum	1974		
11	India Charitrathilekku Oru Ethinottam	1975		
12	Socialism: Siddhanthavum Prayogavum	1976		
13	Chodyotharangal I	1977		
14	Chodyotharangal II	1977		
15	Chodyotharangal III	1977		
16	Chodyotharangal IV	1978		
17	Chodyotharangal V	1978		
18	Chodyotharangal VI	1978		
19	Chodyotharangal VII	1978		
20	Berlin Diary	1978		
21	Euro Communisavum Indian Viplavavum	1979		
22	Chodyotharangal VIII	1980		
23	Kerala Charitravum Samskaravum – Oru Marxist Veekshanam	1981		
24	Varachattiyil Ninnu Eritheeyilekku	1981		
25	Ashanum Malayala Sahityavum	1981		
26	Samooham Bhasha Sahityam	1981		
27	Sakhakkal Suhruthukkal	1981		
28	Vedangalude Naadu	1981		
29	Indian Swathanthrya Samara Charitram	1982		
30	Aasoothranam Prathisanthiyil	1982		
31	Marxism Marxinu Shesham	1982		
32	Marxisathinte Prasakthi Innu	1983		
33	Yukthivadavum Communistukarum	1984		
34	Kerala Charitravum Samskaravum	1984		
35	Communist Party Keralathil: Bhagam I	1984		
36	Communist Party Keralathil: Bhagam II	1986		
37	Marxisavum Sahityavum	1986		
38	Socialisathilekkulla Indian Patha	1986		
39	Asian Diary	1986		
40	European Diary	1986		
41	Communist Party Keralathil: Bhagam III	1987		
42	Oru Indian Communistinte Ormakkurippukal	1987		
43	Russia-China Sandarshanangal	1988		
45	Malayala Sahitya Niroopanathil Marxisathinte Swadheenam	1989		
46	Nehruvum Nehruisavum	1989		
47	Thiranjedutha Prabandhangal	1990		
48	Navothanavum Malayala Sahityavum	1990		
49	Marxism-Leninism: Oru Patapusthakam	1990		
50	Kerala Charitram Marxist Veekshanathil	1990		
51	Mathanirapekshayude Prashnangal	1991		
52	Marx Angels Marxism	1991		
53	Socialisathilekkulla Indian Patha	1991		
54	Leninism: Utbhavavum Valarchayum	1992		
55	Achuthamenon: Vyakthiyum Rashtreeyavum	1993		
56	Bourgeoisie Yukthivadathil Ninnu Vairudhyathmaka Baudhikavadathilekku	1993		
57	Debiprasad Chattopadhyaya: Indian Marxist Darsanathinte Margadarshi	1993		
58	Jathi Matham Rashtreeyam	1993		
59	CPI(M): Oru Lakhuvivaranam	1993		
60	Communistukarum Desheeya Prasthanavum	1993		
61	Loka Communist Nethakkalodoppam	1994		
62	Marxism-Leninisavum Ashayasamaravum	1994		
63	Keralathile Communist Prasthanam: Utbhavavum Valarchayum	1995		
64	Keralam, India, Lokam: Innum Naleyum	1995		
65	Oru Mun Mukhyamanthriyude Ormakkuruppukal	1995		
66	Bharanakutam: Viplavam Athiviplavam	1995		
67	Marxisavum Sahitya Samvadavum	1995		
68	Oru Indian Communistinte Ormakkurippukal	1996		
69	Jathivirudhavum Mathanirapekshavumaya Keralathilekku	1996		
70	Gramscian Vicharaviplavam	1996	With P. Govinda Pillai	
71	EMS-inte Diary	1996		
72	Mooladhanam: Oru Mukhavura	1996		
73	EMSinte Thiranjedutha Prasangangal	1996		
74	Thozhilali Vargathinte Viplava Bahujana Party	1997		
75	Vayanayude Azhangalil	1997		
76	Nammude Bhasha	1997		
77	Indian Swathanthrya Samaram: Oru Communist Vilayiruthal	1997		
78	Socialisathilekkulla Indian Patha	1997		
79	Indian Swathanthryavum Athinu Sheshavum	1998		
80	Thirinju Nokkumpol	1998		
81	Indian Communist Prasthanam (1920–1988)	1998		

== Notable works on Namboodiripad ==
Sl no.	Title	Author	Year	Language	Reference(s)
1	E. M. S. Oru Jivacharitram	M. A. George	1956	Malayalam	
2	Sakhavu E. M. S. Namboodiripad	Mullasseri Prasannan	1957	Malayalam	
3	E. M. S. Vazhkai Varalar	K. M. Kuttan	1967	Tamil	
4	Ariyappedatha E. M. S.	Appukkuttan Vallikkunnu	1987	Malayalam	
5	Janakodikalude E. M. S.	Manamboor Rajan Babu	1990	Malayalam	
6	Charitrathinoppam Nadanna Oraal	Anil Kumar A. V.	1993	Malayalam	
7	E. M. S. Namboodiripad - The Marxist Leader	S. R. Bakshi	1994	English	
8	E. M. S.	I. V. Das	1994	Malayalam	
9	E. M. S: Viyojanakkurippukal	K. Sukumaran	1996	Malayalam	
10	Mahanadipole Mahamerupole	C. Bhaskaran	1996	Malayalam	
11	E. M. S: Marxist Darsanathinte Samkrama Purushan	Dr. Dharmaraj Adattu	1998	Malayalam	
12	E. M. S. inte Sambhavanakal	C. Bhaskaran	1998	Malayalam	
13	E. M. S: Vakkum Porulum	K. Gopinathan	1998	Malayalam	
14	E. M. S. inte Swapnam	B. Rajeevan	2000	Malayalam	
15	Sakhavu E. M. S.	Pirappancode Murali	2001	Malayalam	
16	E. M. S. um Mukundanum Vilapangalum	Prathap Thayattu	2001	Malayalam	
17	E. M. S. Namboodiripad	P. Govinda Pillai	2006	Malayalam	
18	E. M. S. um Malayala Sahityavum	P. Govinda Pillai	2006	Malayalam	
19	E. M. S. inte Baudhikalokam	C. Bhaskaran	2006	Malayalam	
