= Mezhathur =

- village
- Interactive map of Mezhathur
- Coordinates: 10°47′9″N 76°7′45″E
- Country: India
- State: Kerala
- District: Palakkad

Languages
  - Official: Malayalam, English
- Time zone: UTC+5:30 (IST)
- PIN: 679534
- Telephone code: 91466
- Vehicle registration: KL-52
- Nearest town: Pattambi
- Lok Sabha constituency: Ponnani

Mezhathur is an Indian village in the state of Kerala situated at Pattambi taluk of Palakkad district at the border of Thrissur, Malappuram and Palakkad districts. It is a historical and cultural village in Kerala. It is also the native place of renowned writer and social reformer V. T. Bhattathiripad.

== Etymology ==
Mezhathur got the name from Mezhathol Agnihothri. Agnihothri was the first child of the famous Parayi Petta Panthirukulam (12 children born from the Pariah woman), as the son of Vararuchi.

== Location ==
Mezhathur is located 8 km (5 mi) from Pattambi in between Koottanad and Thrithala. Mezhathur, known as vedic village is a hilly region with herbs, fruits, valleys, lake and brooks.

== Political ==
It comes under the Thrithala block with M. B. Rajesh as the Legislative Assembly representative, while the Parliament's representative is Mr. MP Abdusamad Samadani (Ponnani).

== Climate ==
Mezhathur has similar climatic conditions prevalent elsewhere the state: a dry season from December through February, a hot season from March through May; the Southwest Monsoon from June through September and the North East Monsoon from October through November. The South West Monsoon is usually very heavy and is responsible for nearly 75% of the annual rainfall. The dry season is generally hot and humid, with temperature varying between 22 °C and 35 °C. The average annual rainfall is 2800 mm.

== Transportation ==
Airports : Calicut & Cochin International Airport s are at almost the same distance from Mezhathur (about a two-hour drive). While Coimbatore airport in Tamil Nadu state is about 125 km (78 mi) away.

Railways : The nearest Railway station is Pattambi (about 8 km), while Kuttippuram is 15 km (9 mi).

Roads : Mezhathur is located actually between two major highways. The Main road connecting 3 km (2 mi) in Koottanad the state Highway (SH 39) Guruvayoor - Palakkad and Thrithala Main Road (2 km) connecting Ponnani-Palakkad Highway. The new bridge (Velliyankallu bridge) reduces the distance from Thrissur to Kozhikode by 11 km (7 mi). this road also crossing Mezhathur center.

Buses : All major long-route buses stop at Koottanad Junction.

Local Transport : Auto-rickshaws, Cars, etc. are available at every road and at all major junctions they have their slots. Smaller buses ply on regular intervals to the internal locations, as there are narrow roads.

== Education ==
The Mezhathur Higher secondary School started in 1973, has been on a path of revival for the past 10 years with elimination of campus politics/elections. Past few years the SSLC and pass percentage have been one of the highest, it has started +2 education level with new buildings. Recently the school has got a modern play-ground/auditorium. The name of Mezhathur Higher secondary School has been changed V. T. Bhattathiripad Memorial Higher secondary School.

== Religious ==
The population consists of mainly Muslims and Hindus. February month Pooram and Nercha festival season .

== Kaithara Shiva Temple Mezhathur ==
This Shiva Temple is situated at Mezhathur in Palakkad District, Kerala State, India. The Shiva Linga is supposed to have been installed by Agnihothri the eldest son of Sage Vararuchi. The history traces the period to the 4th Century Circa. There are great many historians who are working on the subject. To this day all the 12 families of Sage Vararuchi assemble once in year to pay homage to the departed souls of their Family.

The Shiva Linga is a massive piece of stone of more than 3 feet in height. According to Vasthu sasthra the bigger the Linga the greater is its influence to its surroundings. This temple was looked after by Kaithara Variam members. When the Communist ministry of Kerala took over the Land of Hindu temples in the middle of last Century, the temple lost all its wealth, except the 50 cents of Lands on which it is now standing.

== Notable residents ==
- V. T. Bhattathiripad, Dramatist and a prominent freedom fighter
- M. P. Sankunni Nair, Sanskrit Scholar. Recipient of Kerala Sahitya Academy's and Kendra Sahithya Academy's awards.
