= Vattenad =

- village
- Location in Kerala, India Vattenad (India)
- Coordinates: 10.85°N 76.25°E
- Country: India
- State: Kerala
- District: Palakkad

Languages
  - Official: Malayalam, English
- Time zone: UTC+5:30 (IST)
- PIN: 679533
- Vehicle registration: KL-09, KL-52

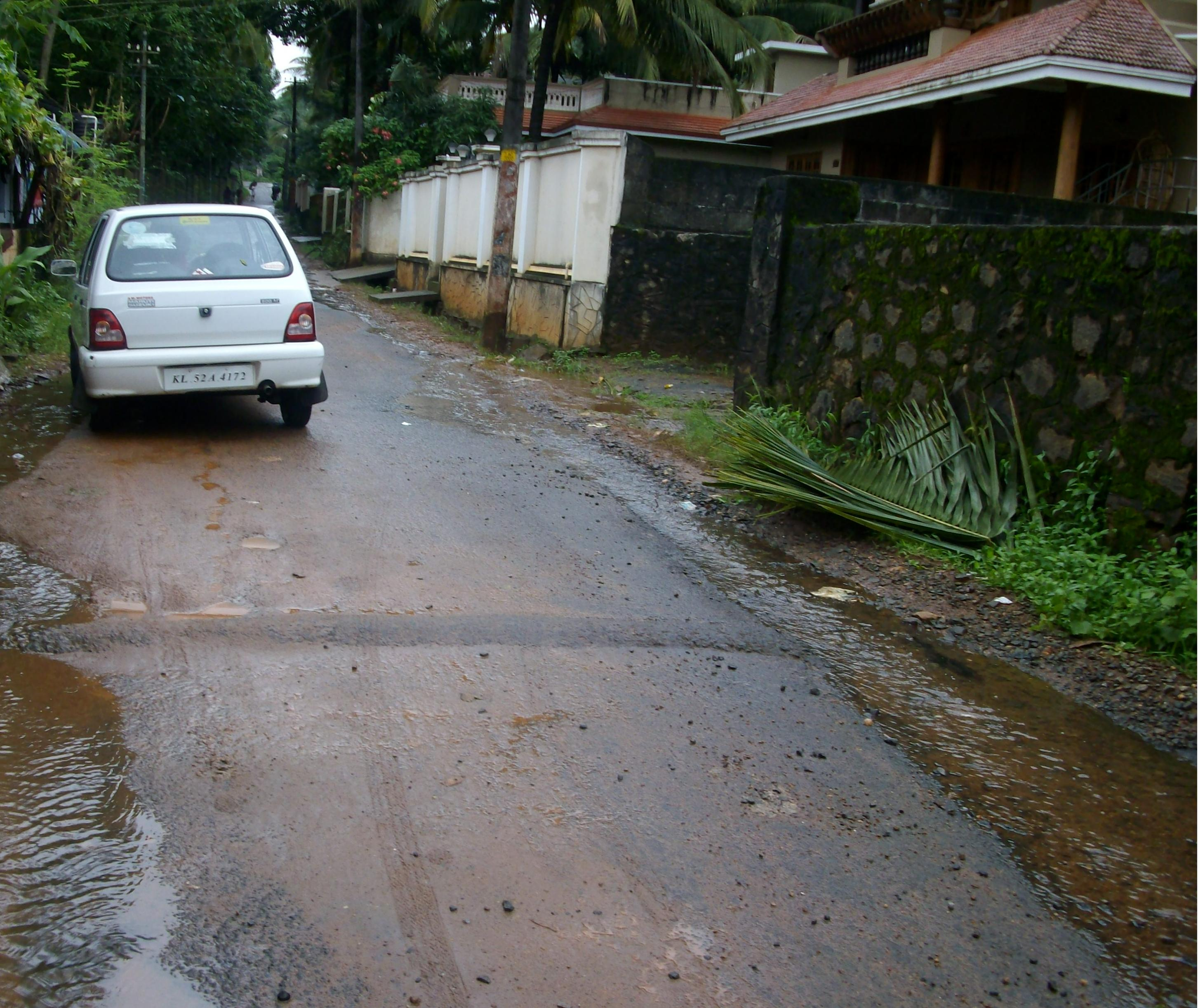
A view of the vattenad road in rain season

Vattenad is a small village in Pattambi taluk, Palakkad district in the state of Kerala, India. It is located in pattithara Panchayath near koottanad town.
