= M. R. Bhattathiripad =

Indian social reformer, cultural leader and Malayalam writer

- Born: 1908; British India
- Died: 2001 (aged 92–93)
- Occupations: Social reformer, writer
- Parent(s): Mullamangalath Keralan Bhattathiripad, Arya Antharjanam

Mullamangalath Raman Bhattathiripad (1908–2001) was an Indian social reformer, cultural leader and a Malayalam writer.

== Biography ==
He was born in 1908 Kerala with limited resources due to which he received only nominal education.

He joined Yogakshema Sabha and worked with V. T. Bhattathiripad and his brother Premji. He was also an active member of Purogamana Sahitya Prasthanam. When widow marriage was considered a taboo in Nambuthiri community, he married Uma Antharjanam, younger sister of VT's wife Sreedevi Antharjanam, on 13 September 1934. This was the first known widow marriage in the Kerala Nambuthiri community. The ceremony, though boycotted by orthodox Nambudiris, was attended by Arya Pallam and M. C. Joseph. Bhattathiripad's younger brother Premji later followed his brother in 1943 by marrying a 27-year old widow named Arya Antharjanam.

When Kerala Sangeetha Nataka Akademi started its flagship publication, Keli in 1963, Bhattathiripad was the first editor.

He died on 8 October 2001, aged 93. He is survived by his three daughters. His wife predeceased him in 1996. His brother Premji also predeceased him.

== Works ==
MRB wrote 14 books.

- Ente Omana – Play – 1927
- Marakkudakkullile Maha Narakam – Play – 1927
- Mazhavillu – Short stories – 1931
- Valkannadi – Novel – 1931
- Mukhachayakal – Travelogue – 1954
- Mula pottiya vithukal – Travelogue – 1956
- Kinavil oru yathra – Travelogue – 1962
- Kavisaparya – Travelogue – 1962
- Thamarayithalukal – Travelogue – 1967
- Ilakal Poovukal – Travelogue – 1969
- Valapottukal – Poetic memoirs – 1968
- Suvarnachaayakal

== Awards and recognitions ==
He was a recipient of the Kerala Sangeetha Nadaka Academy Award, the Kerala Sahithya Academy Award (1992), the Basheer Puraskaram, and the Deviprasadam Trust Award.

== See also ==
- V. T. Bhattathiripad
- E. M. S. Namboodiripad
