= Vavanoor =

- village
- Location in Kerala, India Vavanoor (India)
- Coordinates: 10.7659°N 76.1425°E
- Country: India
- State: Kerala
- District: Palakkad

Languages
  - Official: Malayalam, English
- Time zone: UTC+5:30 (IST)
- Vehicle registration: KL-52

Vavanoor is a village in Pattambi taluk in Palakkad district of Kerala state, south India. The village is located near Koottanad, Pattambi.

The nearest railway station is in Pattambi, while the nearest airports are in Kozhikode, and Nedumbassery. The Post Office with PIN 679533 is located at Thekke Vavanoor.
