= Piravi =

- Cannes Film Festival poster
- Directed by: Shaji N. Karun
- Written by: S. Jayachandran Nair; Reghunath Paleri; Shaji N. Karun
- Produced by: S. Jayachandran Nair
- Starring: Premji; Archana; Lakshmi Krishnamoorthy; C. V. Sreeraman; Mullenezhi; K. Gopalakrishnan
- Cinematography: Sunny Joseph
- Edited by: Venugopal
- Music by: G. Aravindan; Mohan Sithra
- Release date: January 1989
- Running time: 110 minutes
- Country: India
- Language: Malayalam

Piravi (English: The Birth) is a 1989 Indian Malayalam-language drama film directed by Shaji N. Karun. It stars Premji, Archana and Lakshmi Krishnamurthy. The film is based on the life of professor T. V. Eachara Warrier, whose son, a student in Regional Engineering College, Calicut, was killed in police custody during the National Emergency Period of 1976. The film's music was composed by G. Aravindan and Mohan Sithara. Piravi received widespread critical acclaim upon release. The film was screened and very well received at many film festivals and won at least 31 awards, including the Caméra d'Or — Mention Spéciale at the 1989 Cannes Film Festival. It also won the National Film Award for Best Feature Film at the Indian National Film Awards in 1989.

== Plot ==
Raghu is one of two children born to Raghava Chakyar and his wife. Born many years after his parents' marriage, Raghu is brought up with immense devotion and love until adulthood.

Now studying in an engineering college far from home, Raghu must return home for the engagement ceremony of his sister, but fails to turn up. His father Raghavan waits endlessly for his son to return. Raghavan takes daily trips to the local bus stop, waiting all day in the hope that Raghu will eventually come home. Soon the family comes to know through newspapers that Raghu has been taken into custody by the police for political reasons.

Raghavan sets out to try to find his son, and he eventually reaches police headquarters. However the police pretend not to know about Raghu or his whereabouts, and also deny that Raghu was ever taken into custody. Raghu's sister eventually comes to the realization that her brother has probably died as a result of police torture, but hasn't the heart to tell her father. Raghavan slowly begins to lose grip of reality and starts to dream of his family reuniting once more.

== Cast ==
- Premji as Professor Raghava Chakyar
- Archana as Chakyar's daughter
- M. Chandran Nair
- Mullanezhi
- Surendran
- V. K. Sreeraman
- K Gopalakrishnan
- Kottara Gopalakrishnan Nair
- Lakshmi Amma
- Lakshmi Krishnamoorthy
- Shantha Ramachandran
- Leela
- Rahul Laxman as Chakyar's son
- Ammini

== Awards ==
The film was nominated for or won the following awards:

1989 Cannes Film Festival (France)

- Won - Caméra d'Or - Mention d'honneur - Shaji N. Karun

1989 Edinburgh International Film Festival (UK)

- Won - Sir Charles Chaplin Award - Piravi - Shaji N. Karun

1989 Locarno International Film Festival (Switzerland)

- Won - Prize of the Ecumenical Jury - Special Mention - Shaji N. Karun
- Won - Silver Leopard - Shaji N. Karun
- Nominated - Golden Leopard - Shaji N. Karun

1989 National Film Awards (India)

- Won - Golden Lotus Award - National Film Award for Best Feature Film - Shaji N. Karun
- Won - Golden Lotus Award - Best Director - Shaji N. Karun
- Won - Silver Lotus Award - Best Actor - Premji
- Won - Silver Lotus Award - Best Audiography - T. Krishnanunni

1989 Kerala State Film Awards (India)

- Won - Kerala State Film Award for Best Actor - Premji
- Won - Kerala State Film Award for Second Best Film

1989 Filmfare Awards South

- Won - Filmfare Award for Best Actor – Malayalam -Premji
- Won - Filmfare Award for Best Director - Malayalam - Shaji N Karun

1989 Hawaii International Film Festival (United States)

- Won - Best Feature Film - Piravi - Shaji N. Karun

1989 Chicago International Film Festival (United States)

- Won - Silver Hugo - Piravi - Shaji N. Karun

1990 Bergamo Film Meeting (Italy)

- Won - Bronze Rosa Camuna - Shaji N. Karun

1990 Fribourg International Film Festival (Switzerland)

- Won - Distribution Help Award - Shaji N. Karun

1991 Fajr Film Festival (Iran)

- Won - Crystal Simorgh - International Competition: Superb Film - Piravi - Shaji N. Karun
