= Deshabhimani =

Indian newspaper

- Type: Daily newspaper
- Owner: Kerala State Committee of the Communist Party of India (Marxist)
- Editor-in-chief: Puthalath Dinesan
- General manager: K. J. Thomas
- Founded: 6 September 1942; 84 years ago
- Language: Malayalam
- Headquarters: Trivandrum, Kerala
- Circulation: 622,276 (as of 2022)
- Website: www.deshabhimani.com/epaper

Deshabhimani is a Malayalam newspaper and the organ of the Kerala State Committee of the CPI(M). It started as a weekly in Kozhikode on 6 September 1942 and converted to a daily in 1946. The paper is now published from ten different centres: Kozhikode, Kochi, Thiruvananthapuram, Kannur, Kottayam, Thrissur, Palakkad, Alappuzha, Kollam and Malappuram. At present, Puthalath Dinesan, Central Committee and State Secretariat Member of the CPI(M), is the chief editor of the paper, K.J. Thomas, CPI(M), secretariat member of the CPI(M), the general manager and ex-MLA M. Swaraj the resident editor.

Deshabhimani is the third largest Malayalam-language newspaper by circulation. As of Indian Readership Survey of 2019, it was also in the third position in terms of readership in Kerala, after Malayala Manorama and Mathrubhumi.

The news website is published under a public open license CC-BY 4.0.

== History ==
Deshabhimani has a predecessor, Prabhatham (which means 'Dawn'). It was started in 1935 and was the manifesto of the socialist group in the Indian National Congress. It was in 1942, through the efforts of eminent leaders like A. K. Gopalan and E. M. S. Namboodiripad (who in fact donated all of his ancestral property for raising funds for the paper) Deshabhimani started and became the voice of the CPI and later became the voice of CPI(M), after the split from CPI in 1964. Various personalities like E. M. S. Namboodiripad, V. T. Induchoodan, K. P. R. Gopalan, E. K. Nayanar and V. S. Achuthanandan, have served as the chief editor of Deshabhimani. Notable journalists that have worked with Deshabhimani include P. Govinda Pillai, Ezhacherry Ramachandran, and Prabha Varma.

== Supplements ==
- Deshabhimani Varanthappathippu
- Aksharamuttam
- Sthree
- Kilivaathil
- Thozhil

== Publications ==
- Deshabhimani Varika (Weekly)
- Thathamma (Children's Publication)
