= P. Govinda Pillai =

Indian politician

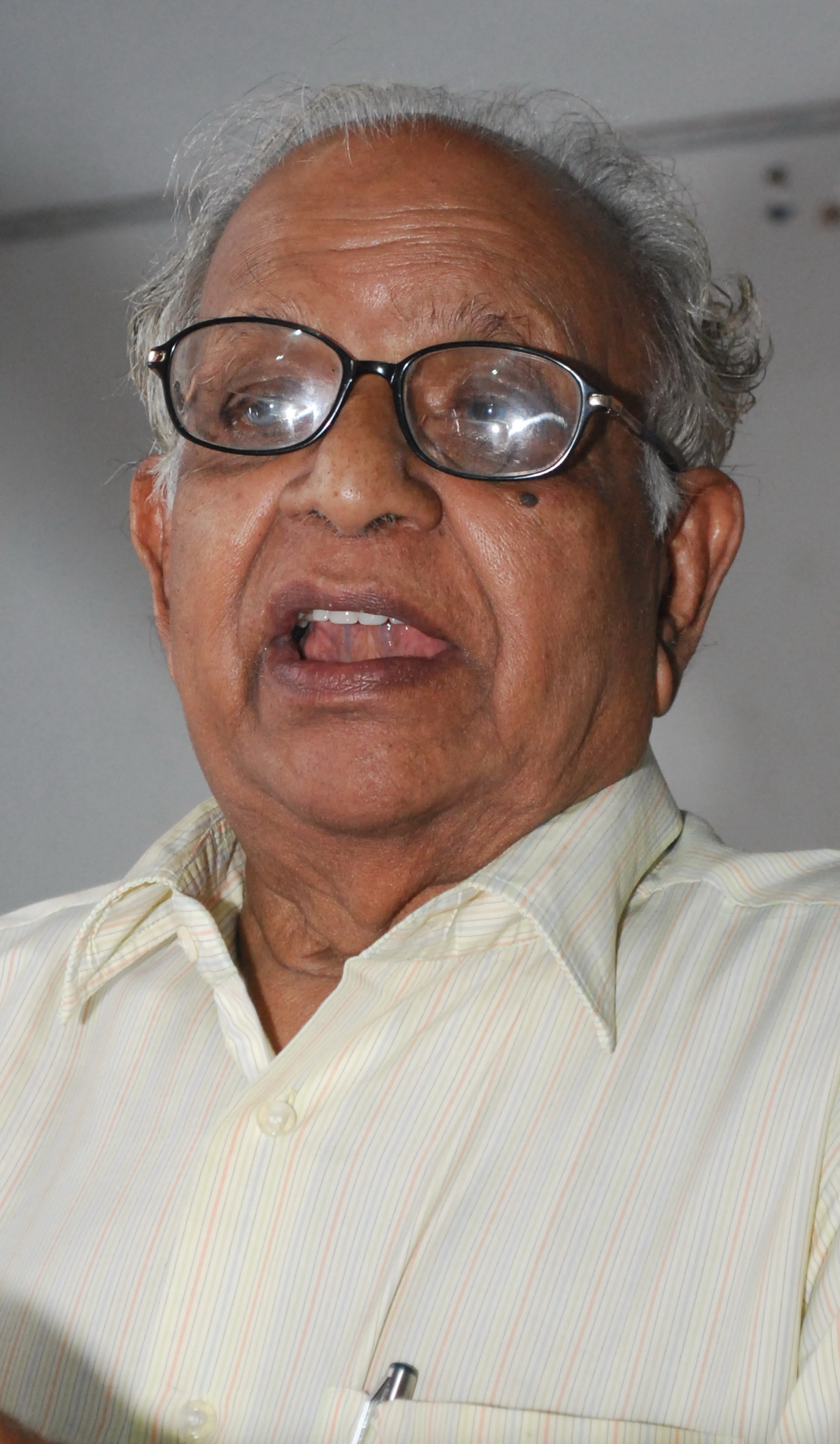
- Born: 23 May 1926; Pulluvazhy, Perumbavoor, Kerala, India
- Died: 22 November 2012 (aged 86); Thiruvananthapuram, Kerala
- Other name: PG
- Occupation: Politician

Parameswaran Govinda Pillai (23 May 1926 – 22 November 2012) was an Indian politician and Marxist ideologue belonging to the Communist Party of India (Marxist) from Kerala. He was also the former Chief Editor of Deshabhimani.

== Early life ==
Pillai was born on 23 May 1926 in Pulluvazhi, Perumbavoor, in a Nair family, as the son of Parameswaran Pillai and Parukuttyamma. He graduated with BA Hons. from St. Xavier's, Mumbai.

== Career ==
Pillai joined the Communist Party of India (Marxist) in 1964, and was arrested and remained in prison until 1951. He was elected as a member of Thiru-Kochi Assembly in 1951 and later as a member of the Kerala Legislative Assembly (1967–70). As a CPIM member, he served as the chief editor of party mouthpiece Deshabhimani from 1964 to 1983. He was the Kerala Press Academy Chairman 1981–82.

Pillai wrote and spoke widely on the subject of fine arts and served as the Chairman of the Kerala State Film Development Corporation and as the founding Director of the Centre for Development of Imaging Technology (C-DIT).

Pillai often appeared on Kairali TV, commenting on national and international events. In 2010, he received the Janasevana Praveen from the V. Sambasivan Foundation.

== Views ==
According to The Hindu, Pillai was an "intellect deeply anchored in the Marxist-Leninist ideology" and was widely regarded as an "organic intellectual" in the Gramscian tradition. Alongside E. M. S. Namboothiripad, he "played a major role in taking Marxist thought to the common people" of Kerala. Although he had been a member of the CPIM since its formation in 1964, Pillai at times differed from the party's official positions and faced disciplinary action as a result. Notably, he supported activists involved in the Save Silent Valley movement in the 1970s and opposed the party's position of "glorifying the Tiananmen Square massacre".

His unfavorable critical remarks about E.M.S. Namboodiripad on various issues invited fierce backlash from the Communist Party of India (Marxist) politburo. The party saw it as "grave indiscipline" and publicly censured him on the issue. However, i

== Death ==
He died on 22 November 2012 in Thiruvananthapuram, Kerala. Aged 86 at the time of his death, he suffered from numerous aging-associated diseases like diabetes and heart disease. He was cremated with full state honours at Santhikavadam crematorium nearby the next day. Being an atheist, he was cremated without any religious rituals.

== Bibliography ==
Pillai has 37 books to his credit, including an English book published posthumously.

=== Books ===
- Marxum mooladhanavum (Marx and Capital)
- Isangalkkippuram (Within "ism"s)
- Marxist saundaryashastram, udbhavavum valarchayum (Marxist aesthetics: origin and growth)
- Bhudakaalavum Munvidhiyum (Past and Prejudice)
- Frederick Engels – Snigdhanaya Sahakari Varishtanaya viplavakari
- Mar Gregoriosinte Mathavum Marxisavum (Religion and Marxism of Mar Gregorios)
- EMS um Malayala Sahityavum (EMS and Kerala literature)
- Kerala Navodhanam Oru Marxist Veekshanam Vol 1 (Kerala renaissance: A Marxist perspective Vol 1)
- Kerala Navodhanam Oru Marxist Veekshanam – Mathacharyar Mathanishedhikal
- Mahabharatham Muthal Communism Vare (From Mahabharatha to Communism)
- Mulkraj Muthal Pavanan Vare (From Mulkraj to Pavanan)
- Aagolavalkaranam Maadhyamam Samskaram (Globalization Media Culture)
- EMS Namboothiripad – A Biography
- Charles Darwin;Jeevithavum Kaalavum (2009) (Charles Darwin: life and times)
- Vynjanika viplavam-Oru samskarika charithram (2011) (Knowledge revolution: A cultural history)
- Guide book for Gramcii readers (joint author with EMS)
- Samskaravum Navodhanavum translated by P. P. Sathyan.
- The Bhakti Movement: Renaissance or Revivalism?

=== Translations ===
- Kaattukadannal (Gadfly by Ethel Lilian Voynich)
- Bhoothakalavum Munvidhikalum (Past and Prejudice by Romila Thapar)

== Awards ==
- 2007: Abu Dhabi Sakthi Award (Scholarly literature)
