= Prabhatham =

Malayalam-language weekly newspaper

Prabhatham was a Malayalam-language weekly newspaper published from Shoranur in Malabar, British India. Founded in 1935 and edited by E. M. S. Namboodiripad, it was the organ of the Congress Socialist Party (CSP) in Malabar, Travancore and Cochin. The newspaper was subjected to censorship right from its inception. It had to close down due to the heavy security imposed on the paper for publishing a poem on Bhagat Singh's death. The newspaper resumed publication in April 1938. It shifted to Calicut and continued as a weekly until the outbreak of World War II in September 1939. Prabhatham was a short-lived newspaper both because of the colonial repression and because the CSP had lost its relevance after the formation of the Communist Party of India. The newspaper was instrumental in spreading socialist and communist ideologies in Kerala.

== History ==

When the communist faction of the Indian National Congress formed the Congress Socialist Party in October 1934, its Kerala state committee decided that the party should have a mouthpiece in Kerala. As the British government would not allow the spread of socialist ideas, the newspaper got permission through a strategic move. A newspaper was being published under the name of Prabhatham in Calicut and its owner K. S. Nair had decided to sell it due to financial difficulties. It was printed at Udayabhanu Press in Calicut. That press was on bank debt and the newspaper could be sold only after paying the liability. The money was paid by E. M. S. Namboodiripad and the press was brought to Shoranur which was the headquarters of the newspaper. Kunjirama Poduval (Nawab Rajendran's father), who conducted the newspaper in Calicut, also arrived.

The first issue of Prabhatham was published on 9 January 1935. It was edited by Namboodiripad, and printed and published by I. C. P. Namboodiri. K. P. Damodaran was the Manager. The weekly included a column by Namboodiripad explaining the philosophical and political lines of the party, articles by P. Krishna Pillai, Moyarath Sankaran, K. Damodaran etc., and translations of articles from the CSP national mouthpiece, Congress Socialist. In protest against the hanging of Bhagat Singh in 1935, Chowara Parameswaran wrote a poem starting "Viplavam Neenal Jaiyakette, Samrajya Dushprabhuthvathe Chavittimatteeduvan". The weekly had to cease publication in August 1935 because it could not pay the Rs. 2000 fine imposed for publishing the poem. In 1937, when C. Rajagopalachari became the chief minister, many orders of the British government were cancelled.

The party committee meeting held on 10 March 1938 decided to resume the publication of Prabhatham. Namboodiripad continued his role as editor while P. K. Balakrishnan became the printer and publisher and A. K. Gopalan became the manager. The newspaper shifted to Calicut and started publication again on 11 April 1938. Prabhatham continued as a weekly until the outbreak of World War II in September 1939.

Prabhatham was a short-lived newspaper both because of the colonial repression and because the CSP had lost its relevance after the formation of the Communist Party of India. Nevertheless, it was successful in spreading the socialist and communist ideologies in Kerala. Namboodiripad was successful in organising the farmers and the working class through his writings in Prabhatham. The newspaper had a page devoted for the news about agricultural labourers, mill workers and municipal employees. The formation of unions, the resolutions adopted at meetings, and the progress of strikes received extensive coverage. It was effectively replaced by Deshabhimani Weekly which started publication on 6 September 1942.
