= V. T. Bhattathiripad =

Indian social critic and dramatist

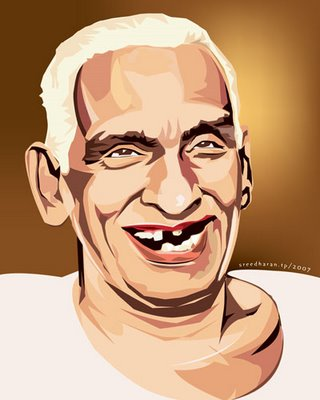
- Born: Raman Bhattathiripad; 26 March 1896; Mezhathur, Ponnani taluk Malabar District, Madras Presidency, British India (Present day Pattambi Taluk, Palakkad district)
- Died: 12 February 1982 (aged 85)
- Occupations: Social reformer; Indian independence activist; writer
- Known for: Social activism, Indian independence movement, writings
- Spouse: Sreedevi Antharjanam
- Parent(s): Thuppan Bhattathiripad, Sridevi Antharjanam
- Awards: 1976 Kerala Sahitya Akademi Fellowship

Vellithuruthi Thazhathu Karutha Patteri Raman Bhattathiripad (26 March 1896 – 12 February 1982) was an Indian social reformer, dramatist and an Indian independence activist. He was best known for his contributions in the reformation of the Namboothiri community. He wrote a number of books which include a play, Adukkalayail Ninnu Arangathekku and his autobiography, Kanneerum Kinavum (Tears and Dreams in English) and many critics consider them as notable works in Malayalam literature. Kerala Sahitya Akademi honoured him with distinguished fellowship in 1976.

== Biography ==
V. T. Bhattathiripad, born Raman Bhattathiripad, was born on 26 March 1896 to Thuppan Bhattathiripad and Sridevi Antharjanam in Kaippilly Mana at Mezhathur, Ponnani taluk Malabar District, Madras Presidency, British India (present day Pattambi taluk) , on the bank of River Ponnani. He belonged to the family of Mezhathol Agnihothri on his father's side and had the lineage of Adi Sankara on his mother's side. After early education in the traditional way under Narayanan Othikkan, he studied under Pathakkara Manaikkal Meledam and Muthukurissi Mana Kunjunni Namboothirippad and on completion of vedic studies, he started working as a priest at shornur Mundamuka Sastha temple, owned by Kudalloor Mana. A ten-year-old girl from the neighbourhood taught him Malayalam alphabets and mathematics. (Note: His autobiography, Kanneerum Kinavum, has more details) He would study English soon after by joining Edakkuni Namboodiri School during which time he also ran a magazine by name, Vidyarthi.

Indian independence movement was gaining popularity and Bhattathiripad participated in the Allahabad session of the Indian National Congress due to which he was expelled from his community. This prompted him to fight against casteism and he started campaigning for Brahmin widow remarriage and for raising funds for the campaign, he organized a march from Thrissur to Chandragiri River in 1931 which came to be known as Yachana Yathra (Begging March).

The first marriage of Bhattathiripad did not last long and later he married Sreedevi Antharjanam of Ittyaparambath Illam. He died on 12 February 1982, at the age of 85.

== Legacy ==
Bhattathiripad sought the emancipation of Namboothiri women, and encouraged widow marriages which was a taboo during those times. Along with M. R. Bhattathiripad, popularly known as MRB, he campaigned for widow remarriage by putting it in practice in his own household; he gave his sister in law. a widow, in marriage to MRB which was the first widow remarriage among Namboothiris in Kerala. Another widow marriage also followed soon which was the marriage of M. P. Bhattathiripad, better known as Premji, who was MRB's younger brother, to Arya, a 27 year old Namboothiri widow and Bhattathiripad, along with E. M. S. Namboothiripad, as well as the couple were excommunicated (Brashtu) by the community leaders.

Bhattathiripad utilised his writing skills as a tool for social reforms and his writings contrasted the social changes that followed the Indian independence movement against the dormant state of Namboothiri community. The staging of his play, Adukkalayilninnu Arangathekku (From the Kitchen to the Stage), which featured Premji as one of the actors, in 1929 at Edakkunni, a village in Thrissur, was an important event in the social reform calendar of Kerala; the play highlighted the discriminatory rituals and practices prevalent in the Namboothiri community, especially the plight of Namboothiti women. The drama also marked a deviation in Malayalam theatre from historical plays to social dramas. (Note: The year 1929 is most significant in the sense that V. T. Bhattathiripad wrote his play Adukkalayilninnu Arangathekku. It was the first play in Malayalam to have a definite and concrete social objective and which was produced in 1930 itself as part of a very powerful social reformist movement led by Namboodiri Yogakshema Sabha. The degenerate Brahmanical ideology and its social structure had its first powerful assault from within for the first time and the most fervent slogan of the period was for the transformation of "Brahmans into human beings.)

Bhattathiripad's oeuvre consists of a play, a short story anthology, eleven essay compilations and three memoirs, of which Kanneerum Kinavum, the first of his three memoirs, narrates his life from 1896 until 1916 and is a documentation of the Namboothiri rituals and feudalism. The book was later translated into English by Sindhu V. Nair under the title, My Tears, My Dreams and was published by Oxford University Press.

== Honours ==
Kerala Sahitya Akademi honoured him with distinguished fellowship in 1976. The Sreekrishnapuram VT Bhattathiripad College in Sreekrishnapuram, Palakkad district, is named after him.

== Bibliography ==
- — (2006). V.T.yude Sampoorna Kruthikal (Complete Works) (4th ed.). DC Books. ISBN 9788171307012.

=== Play ===
- — (1997). Adukkalayilninnu Arangathekku. Kottayam: DC Books.

=== Short story anthology ===
- — (1990). V.T.Yute Kathakal. Trichur: Kerala Sahitya Akademi. ISBN 9788176900096.

=== Essays ===
- — (1961). Sathyamennathu ivide manushyanakunnu. Kottayam: S.P.C.S.
- — (1979). V T yude thiranjedutha upanyasangal. Kottayam: S.P.C.S.
- — (1986). Ente mannu (in Malayalam). Kottayam: N.B.S.
- — (2016). Kalathinte Sakshi (in Malayalam).
- — (2016). Vedivattam (in Malayalam).

=== Memoirs ===
- — (2010). Kanneerum Kinavum. Ḍi Si Buks. ISBN 9788171309535. Archived from the original on 17 May 2021.
- — (1988). Karmavipakam. Trichur: Best Books.
- — (1983). V.T.yude Jeevitha Smaranakal (in Malayalam).

=== Translations ===
- Bhattathiripad, V. T.; Sindhu, V. Nair (2013). My tears, my dreams. New Delhi: Oxford University Press. ISBN 9780198089629.

=== Writings on V. T. Bhattathiripad ===
- M. R. Manmathan (2007). Rebel and the reformer: V.T Bhattathiripad in Historical Perspective.
- V.T.ye Kandethal. Sukapuram: V. T. Smarakasamithi Mezhathur. 1984.
- Palakizhu Narayanan, ed. (1996). V. T. Oru Ithihasam. Thrissur: Current Books.

== See also ==
- Kerala reformation movement
- Hindu reform movements
- Caste system in Kerala
- List of Malayalam-language authors
- Ayyathan Gopalan

== See Also (Social reformers of Kerala) ==
- Sree Narayana Guru
- Dr. Palpu
- Kumaranasan
- Rao Sahib Dr. Ayyathan Gopalan
- Brahmananda Swami Sivayogi
- Vaghbhatananda
- Mithavaadi Krishnan
- Moorkoth Kumaran
- Ayyankali
- Ayya Vaikundar
- Pandit Karuppan
