= V. T. Balram =

Indian politician (born 1978)

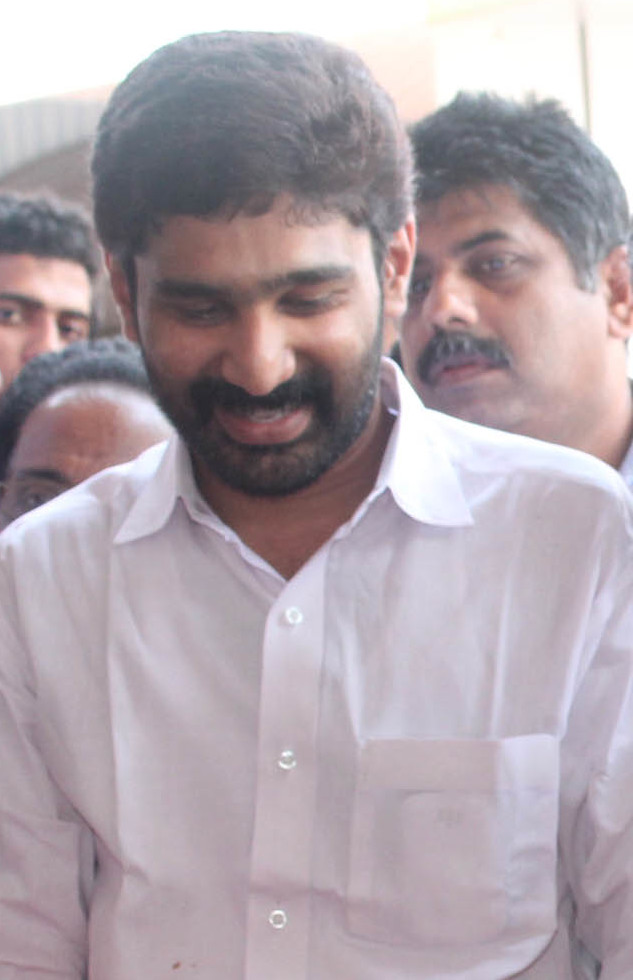

Member of the Kerala Legislative Assembly
- Incumbent
- Assumed office 2026
- Preceded by: M. B. Rajesh
- Constituency: Thrithala

Personal details
- Born: 21 May 1978 (age 48) Thrithala, Palakkad, Kerala, India
- Spouse: Anupama Balram
- Children: 2
- Education: Sree Krishna College, Guruvayur (Bachelor of Science); Government Engineering College, Thrissur (Bachelor of Technology); Government Law College, Thrissur (Bachelor of Laws); Department of Commerce & Management Studies, University of Calicut (Master of Business Administration)

V. T. Balram (born 21 May 1978) is an Indian politician from Kerala and a member of the Indian National Congress and vice-president of Kerala Pradesh Congress Committee. He is a member of the Kerala Legislative Assembly representing Thrithala constituency for the third term. Earlier he represented the constituency for ten years from 2011 to 2021, but was defeated by M. B. Rajesh of Communist Party of India (Marxist) by a vote margin of 3016. In 2026 assembly elections he made a spectacular comeback defeating the same M. B. Rajesh who was a sitting minister in the Pinarayi Vijayan government. Balram now serves as the Chairperson of the Estimates Committee of the Assembly.

== Early life and education ==
Balram was born to K. Sreenarayanan and V. T. Saraswathy on 21 May 1978, in Othalur near Thrithala in Pattambi taluk, Palakkad district, Kerala. He did his schooling from Gokhale Government Higher Secondary School, JNV Palakkad and JNV Jhalawar.

While pursuing higher studies he joined student politics through Kerala Students Union. He was elected multiple times to college unions and held responsibilities such as University Union Councillor, Sree Krishna College, Guruvayur (1997) and Government Engineering College, Thrissur (2000); Senate Member, University of Calicut (1999–2000 and 2006–07); Editor, KSU State Kalasala (2007–08); State Secretary, Indian Youth Congress (2009–10); State General Secretary, Indian Youth Congress (2010–13).

He was elected to the Kerala Legislative Assembly for the first time in 2011 from the once communist bastion, Thrithala in Palakkad district. He won a second term in the 2016 Kerala Legislative Assembly election, with a record margin of 10,547 votes at a time when his front, the UDF, managed to win only 47 seats out of the total 140. In 2021 Kerala Legislative Assembly election, Balram lost the election to former Lok Sabha Member of Palakkad M. B. Rajesh, who went on to become Speaker of the Kerala Legislative Assembly and later a minister for Excise and LSGD in the Pinarayi Vijayan government. However in 2026, he regained the Thrithala seat defeating the same rival with a majority of 8,385 votes.

== Cultural and political image ==
In 2016, he supported Amnesty International in the controversy against Akhil Bharatiya Vidyarthi Parishad. He has admitted his son to a government school and declared that he does not want to raise him in any religion or caste. He is noted for his strong opposition to Hindutva and economic reservation for forward castes implemented by the LDF Government of Kerala. A vegetarian for 19 years, he protested against the beef ban in India by eating beef with his friends and shared the video on social media.

He was mocked by the Communist Party of India (Marxist) sympathizers for taking a photograph with transgender activist Sheethal Shyam during a pride parade, for which then Lok Sabha Member M. B. Rajesh tendered an unconditional apology.

In January 2018, he faced an attack for his unsavory comments in social media on the late communist leader A. K. Gopalan, accusing him of child abuse for falling in love with a 11-year-old girl.
