= E. M. S. Namboodiripad =

Indian politician (1909–1998)

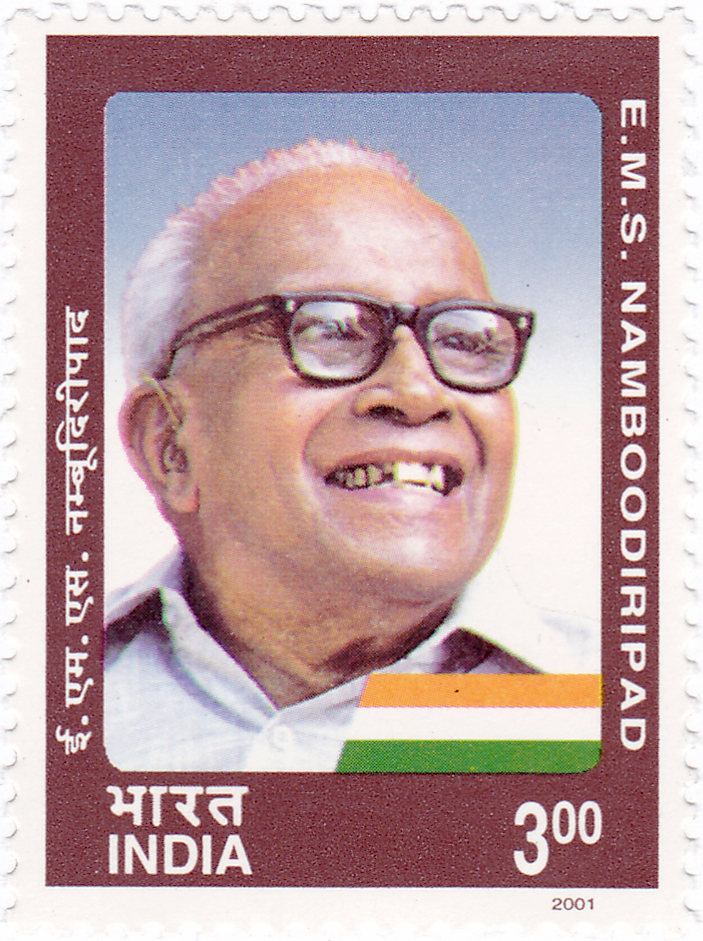

1st Chief Minister of Kerala
- In office 6 March 1967 – 1 November 1969
- Preceded by: R. Sankar
- Succeeded by: C. Achutha Menon
- In office 5 April 1957 – 31 July 1959
- Preceded by: Office established
- Succeeded by: Pattom Thanu Pillai

General Secretary of Communist Party of India
- In office 29 April 1962 – 11 April 1964
- Preceded by: Ajoy Ghosh
- Succeeded by: Chandra Rajeswara Rao

General Secretary of Communist Party of India (Marxist)
- In office 8 April 1978 – 9 January 1992
- Preceded by: P. Sundarayya
- Succeeded by: Harkishan Singh Surjeet

Personal details
- Born: Elamkulam Manakkal Sankaran Namboodiripad; 13 June 1909 Perinthalmanna, Madras Presidency, British India (now Elamkulam, Malappuram district, Kerala, India)
- Died: 19 March 1998 (aged 88) Thiruvananthapuram, Kerala, India
- Party: Communist Party of India (Marxist) (from 1964)
- Other political affiliations: Communist Party of India (before 1964)
- Spouse: Arya Antharjanam (1937–2002)
- Children: 4
- Education: St. Thomas College, Thrissur
- Known for: Co-founding the Communist Party of India (Marxist), Freedom Fighter
- Website: Government of Kerala

Elamkulam Manakkal Sankaran Namboodiripad (Malayalam: [eːlɐŋɡuɭɐm mɐnɐjkːɐl ʃɐŋɡɐɾɐn n̪ɐmbuːd̪iɾipːaːɖə̆], 13 June 1909 – 19 March 1998) was an Indian politician, theorist, author and statesman who served as the first Chief Minister of Kerala in 1957–1959 and then again in 1967–1969. As a member of the Communist Party of India (CPI), he became the first Chief Minister in India not to be a member of the Indian National Congress. In 1964, he led a faction of the CPI that broke away to form the Communist Party of India (Marxist) (CPI(M)).

As chief minister, Namboodiripad pioneered radical land and educational reforms in Kerala, which helped it become the country's leader in social indicators. It is largely due to his commitment and guidance that the CPI(M), of which he was Politburo member and general secretary for 14 years, has become such a domineering political force, playing a vital role in India's new era of coalition politics.

== Early life ==
E. M. Sankaran Namboodiripad was born on 13 June 1909, as the fourth son of Parameswaran Namboodiripad and Vishnudatha Antharjanam, at Elamkulam, situated on the banks of Thuthapuzha River, in Perinthalmanna taluk of the present Malappuram district. He belonged to a prominent Malayali Nambudiri Brahmin family. His two elder brothers died before he was born, and the third brother was intellectually disabled. He lost his mother at 4 and his father at 11.

During the 1921 Malabar rebellion he moved to Irinjalakuda as the belligerent attacked his house. In his early years, he was a close friend of Sr. P. M. Mathew. He was associated with V. T. Bhattathiripad, M. R. Bhattathiripad and many others in the fight against the casteism and conservatism that existed in the Namboothiri community. He became one of the office-bearers of Valluvanadu Yogaskshema Sabha, an organization of progressive Namboothiri youth.

Namboodiripad graduated from St. Thomas College, Thrissur. During his college days, he was deeply associated with the Indian National Congress and the Indian independence movement. It is said he would walk 5–8 km to hear the firebrand Cochin politician V. J. Mathai speak.

Namboodiripad was well known for his stammer. When asked if he always stammered, he would reply, "No, only when I speak."

== Socialism ==
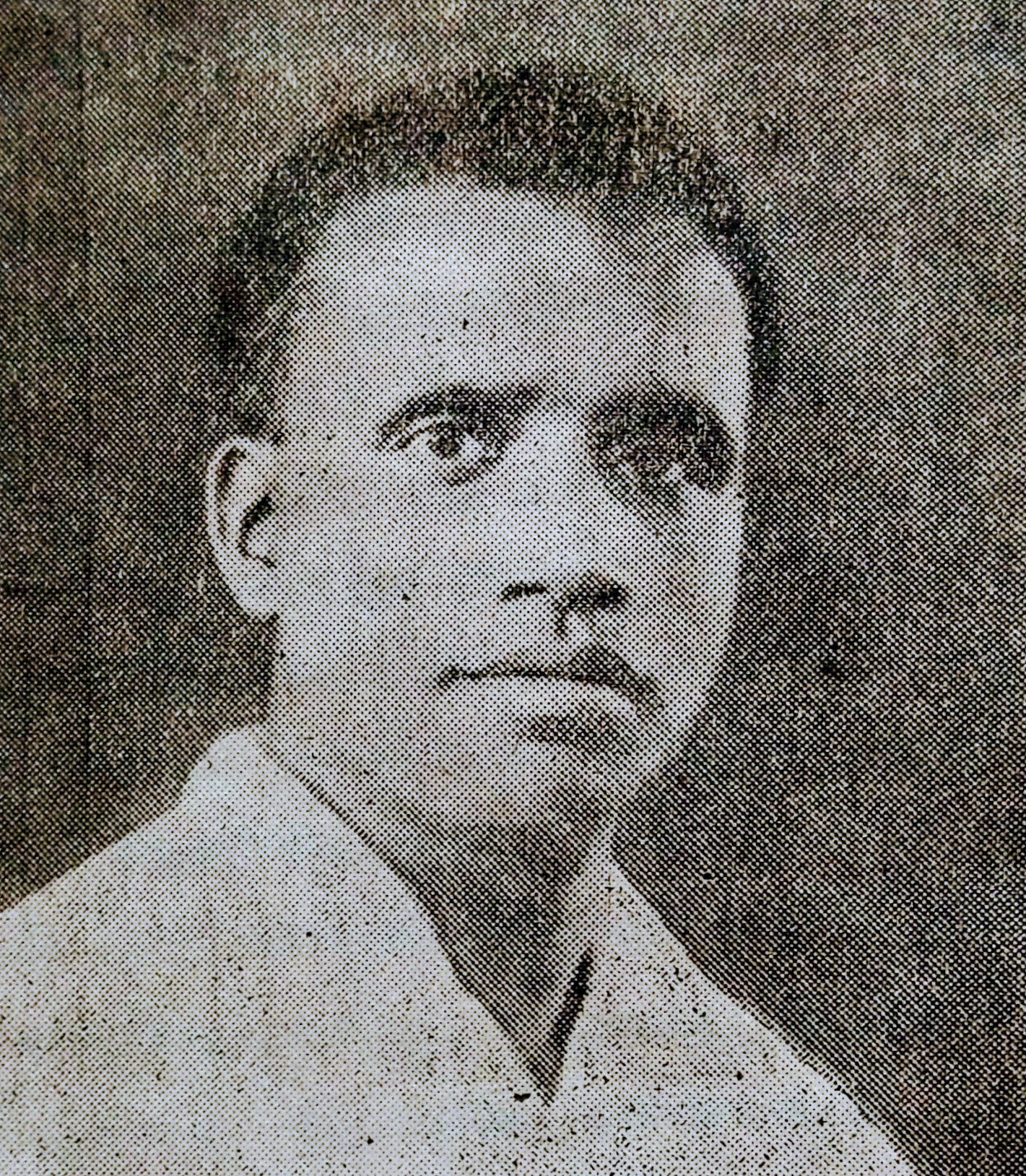
Namboodiripad in the late 1940s

In 1934, he was one of the founders of Congress Socialist Party, a socialist wing within the Indian National Congress, and elected as its All India Joint Secretary from 1934 to 1940. He edited the Malayalam newspaper Prabhatham which was the organ of the Congress Socialist Party in Kerala. During this period, he was also elected to the Madras Legislative Assembly (1939).

He remained committed to socialist ideals, and his compassion towards the working class led him to join the Communist movement. The Indian government considered him to be one of the founders of the Communist Party of India (CPI) in Kerala, forcing him to go into hiding. During the 1962 Sino-Indian war, he was among leaders who aired China's view on the border issue. When the CPI split in 1964, EMS stood with the Communist Party of India (Marxist) (CPI(M)). He was the leader of the Kerala state committee of CPI(M). He served as a member of the Central Committee and the Politburo of the CPI(M) until his death in 1998. EMS became general secretary in 1977, a designation he held until 1992. A Marxist scholar, he influenced the development of Kerala, of which he was the first chief minister.

== Election to state government ==
=== Early days ===
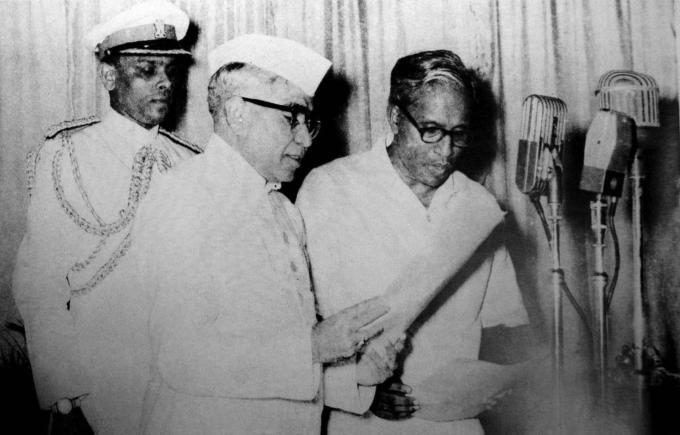
Swearing-in ceremony of Namboodiripad as first Chief Minister of Kerala, April 1957

Kerala Assembly election results
| Election | Year | Party | Constituency | Result |
|---|---|---|---|---|
| Madras Legislative Assembly | 1952 | CPI | Kozhikode | Lost |
| Kerala Legislative Assembly | 1957 | CPI | Thrikaripur | Won |
| Kerala Legislative Assembly | 1960 | CPI | Pattambi | Won |
| Kerala Legislative Assembly | 1965 | CPI | Pattambi | Won |
| Kerala Legislative Assembly | 1967 | CPI(M) | Pattambi | Won |
| Kerala Legislative Assembly | 1970 | CPI(M) | Pattambi | Won |
| Kerala Legislative Assembly | 1977 | CPI(M) | Alathur | Won |

A Communist-led government under E. M. S. Namboodiripad resulted from the first elections for the new Kerala Legislative Assembly in 1957, making him the first communist leader in India to head a popularly elected government. It was the second ever communist government to be democratically elected, after communist success in the 1945 elections in the Republic of San Marino, a microstate in Europe. On 5 April 1957 he was appointed as the first chief minister of Kerala.

=== Liberation struggle ===
His government introduced the Land Reform Ordinance and Education Bill. In 1958, a period of anticommunist protest, the Vimochana Samaram, began in response to the bills.

==== Visit from Nehru ====
On June 22, 1959, Prime Minister Jawaharlal Nehru had a meeting with EMS, and others. Nehru made the visit to personally examine the collapse of the state's law and order after the "liberation struggle" (vimochansamaram) against the EMS government. The movement was led by Christian churches and Hindu caste organisations such as the Nair Service Society (NSS) headed by Mannathu Padmanabha Pillai. The movement saw widespread violence and counter-violence. All along the Nehru's route from the airport to the Raj Bhavan, crowds demanded EMS ministry’s dismissal by the centre. Nehru asked EMS, "How could you make so many enemies in such a short time?" Upon Nehru's return to Delhi, EMS government was dismissed on July 31. Initially, Nehru was hesitant to dismiss a democratically elected government, but he was convinced by Congress President and his daughter, Indira Gandhi.

=== Later times ===
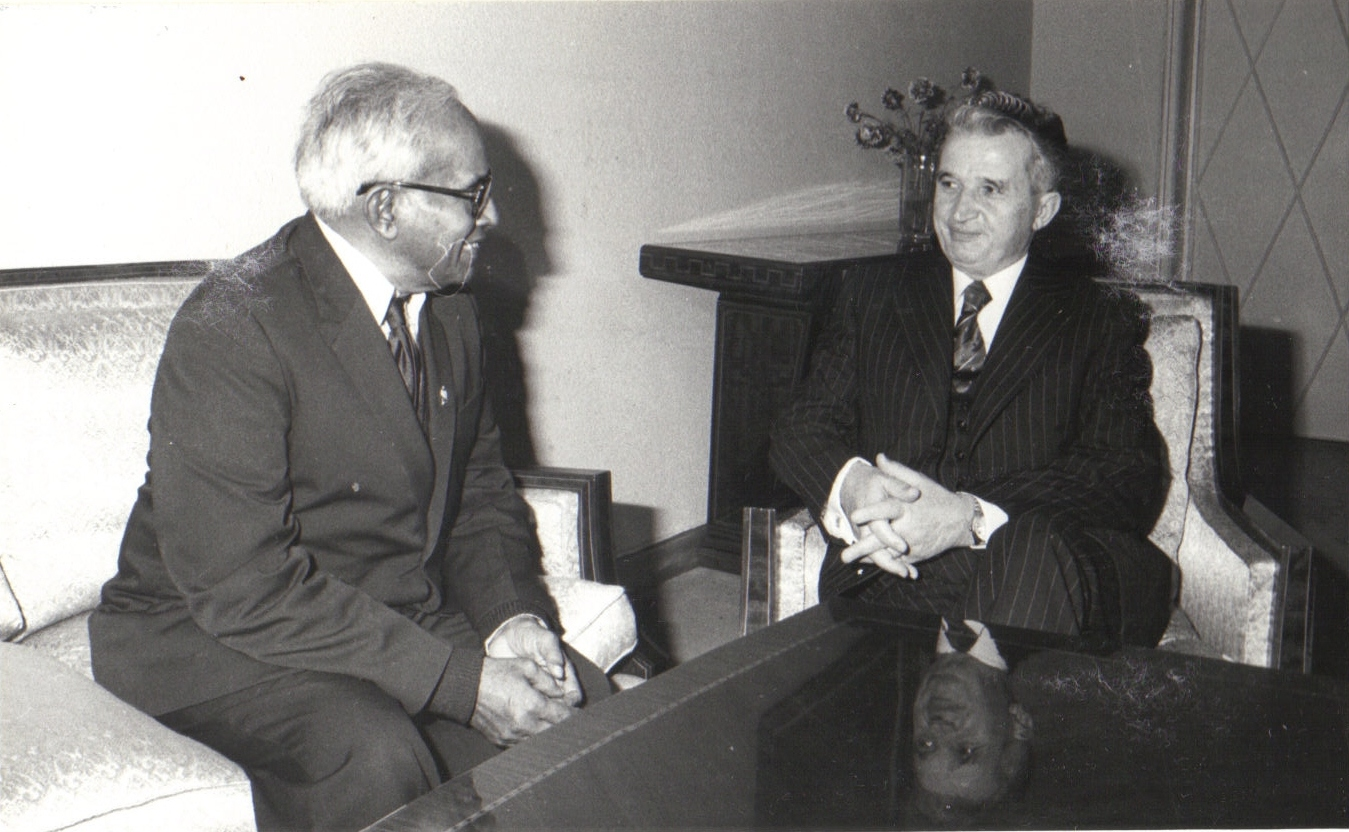
Namboodiripad with Romanian President Nicolae Ceauşescu in 1979.

Namboodiripad became the Chief Minister of Kerala for the second time in 1967 as the leader of a seven-party coalition (Saptakakshi Munnani) which included the CPI and Muslim League. Soon after becoming Chief Minister again, on 31 January 1968 he inaugurated a mechanized coir factory called Floorco in Pozhikkara, Paravur. This time Namboodiripad's tenure lasted for two and a half years, and the government fell on 24 October 1969 due to internal conflicts within the constituent parties.

Namboodiripad was the Leader of Opposition in the Kerala Legislative Assembly from 1960 to 1964 and again from 1970 to 1977. His vision of decentralization of power and resources (People's Plan) and the Kerala Literacy Movement influenced Kerala society. He authored several books in English and Malayalam. Chintha Publication, Kerala has published all his books under the title, "E M S Sanchika". He also was well known as a journalist.

During the 1962 Sino-Indian war, other parties portrayed left-wing parties as pro-China, since both were communist. Namboodiripad stated that the left was focused on solving the border dispute through talks.

=== Ministries ===
Namboodiripad led two ministries in Kerala.

Details of the Ministries led by E. M. S. Namboodiripad
| Sl no. | Ministry | Date formed | Date dissolved | Remarks |
|---|---|---|---|---|
| 1 | First E. M. S. Namboodiripad ministry | 5 April 1957 | 31 July 1959 | Dismissed under Article 356 in the aftermath of the so-called Liberation Struggle |
| 2 | Second E. M. S. Namboodiripad ministry | 6 March 1967 | 1 November 1969 | Tendered resignation as a result of internal dissensions and subsequent loss of majority. |

== Association with Progressive Movement for Arts and Letters ==
Namboodiripad, Kesari Balakrishna Pillai, Joseph Mundassery, M. P. Paul and K. Damodaran were architects of "JeevalSahitya Prastanam", renamed Purogamana Sahitya Prastanam (Progressive Association for Arts and Letters). Though the party considered Kesari one of the visionaries of the Progressive Movement for Arts and Letters in Kerala, serious differences of opinion emerged between full-time Communist Party activists and other personalities, namely Kesari and Mundassery. In this context, Namboodiripad famously accused Kesari of being a "petit-bourgeois intellectual", an appellation he retracted. Namboodiripad also acknowledged some of the earlier misconceptions of the Communist Party with respect to the Progressive Literature and Arts Movement. This debate is known as "Rupa Bhadrata Vivadam", an important milestone in the growth of modern Malayalam literature.

== Death ==
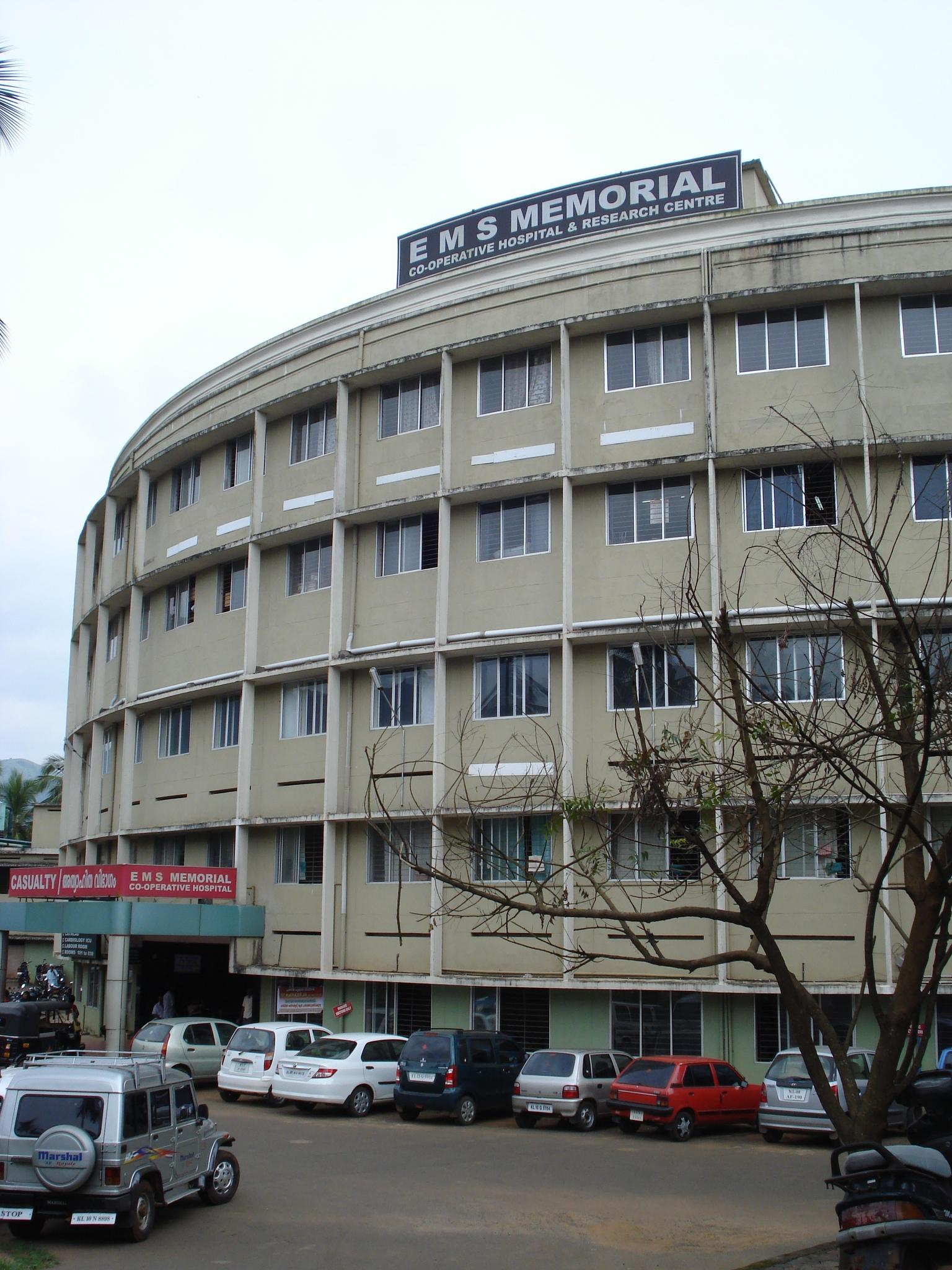
The E.M.S. Memorial Co-operative Hospital in Perinthalmanna

Despite his age and failing health, Namboodiripad was still active in political and social fields. He actively campaigned during the 1998 general election. Soon after the results were declared, he contracted pneumonia, and was admitted to the Cosmopolitan hospital in Thiruvananthapuram, where he died at 3:40 p.m. (IST) on 19 March 1998, aged 88. This was barely hours after he had dictated two articles for Deshabhimani, a CPI (M) daily, and replies to a few letters.

The state government declared a seven-day mourning. His body was draped in the CPI (M) flag and was taken to AKG Centre in the city where members of his family paid their respects, before it was taken to Durbar Hall and was kept for viewing, where members of the public, and party leaders and workers paid their respects. Thousands of people joined the funeral procession and he was cremated with full state honours in Thycaud electric crematorium in Thiruvananthapuram.

President K. R. Narayanan condoled his death and stated: "A scholar, historian and journalist, he was above all an educator of the people as well as their leader. Unremittingly, for the last several decades, he analysed the socio-political scene from the firm-rootedness of his intellectual position and enriched Indian political thought to his very last days." Prime Minister Atal Bihari Vajpayee, who took office on the same day Namboodiripad died, recalled that Namboodiripad had brought to politics a sense of commitment and purpose and that he was a champion of the cause of the working classes and the downtrodden.

Three more deaths occurred in his family within five years after his death, starting with his daughter-in-law Dr. Yamuna in August 2001, and later followed by his wife Arya Antharjanam in January 2002 and elder son E. M. Sreedharan in November 2002. E. M. Sasi, his younger son, died on 24 January 2022 after suffering from a massive heart attack.

== Family ==
Namboodiripad was married to Arya Antharjanam and had two sons – E. M. Sreedharan and E. M. Sasi – and two daughters – E. M. Malathy and E. M. Radha. His grandson (Sreedharan's son) Sujith Shankar is an actor.

== Writing ==
He was a writer and author of several literary works and his book on the history of Kerala is notable.

== In popular culture ==
In the 2014 film Vasanthathinte Kanal Vazhikalil, Sudheesh reprises the role of Namboodiripad.

== See also ==
- Kerala Council of Ministers

Political offices
| Preceded by (none) | Chief Minister of Kerala; 1957–1959 | Succeeded by Pattom Thanupillai |
| Preceded by R. Sankar | Chief Minister of Kerala; 1967–1969 | Succeeded by C. Achutha Menon |
Party political offices
| Preceded by P. Sundarayya | General Secretary of the Communist Party of India (Marxist); 1978–1992 | Succeeded by Harkishan Singh Surjeet |
