= Chalissery =

- Village
- Location in Kerala, India
- Coordinates: 10°45′16″N 76°06′04″E
- Country: India
- State: Kerala
- District: Palakkad

Government
  - Type: Chalissery Grama Panchayat
  - Body: Thrithala (State Assembly constituency)

Languages
  - Official: Malayalam, English
- Time zone: UTC+5:30 (IST)
- PIN: 679536
- Vehicle registration: KL-52
- Nearest city: Pattambi (10 km)
- Lok Sabha constituency: Ponnani

Chalissery is a village and gram panchayat in the Pattambi taluk, Palakkad district, state of Kerala, India.
