= Thrithala =

- Town
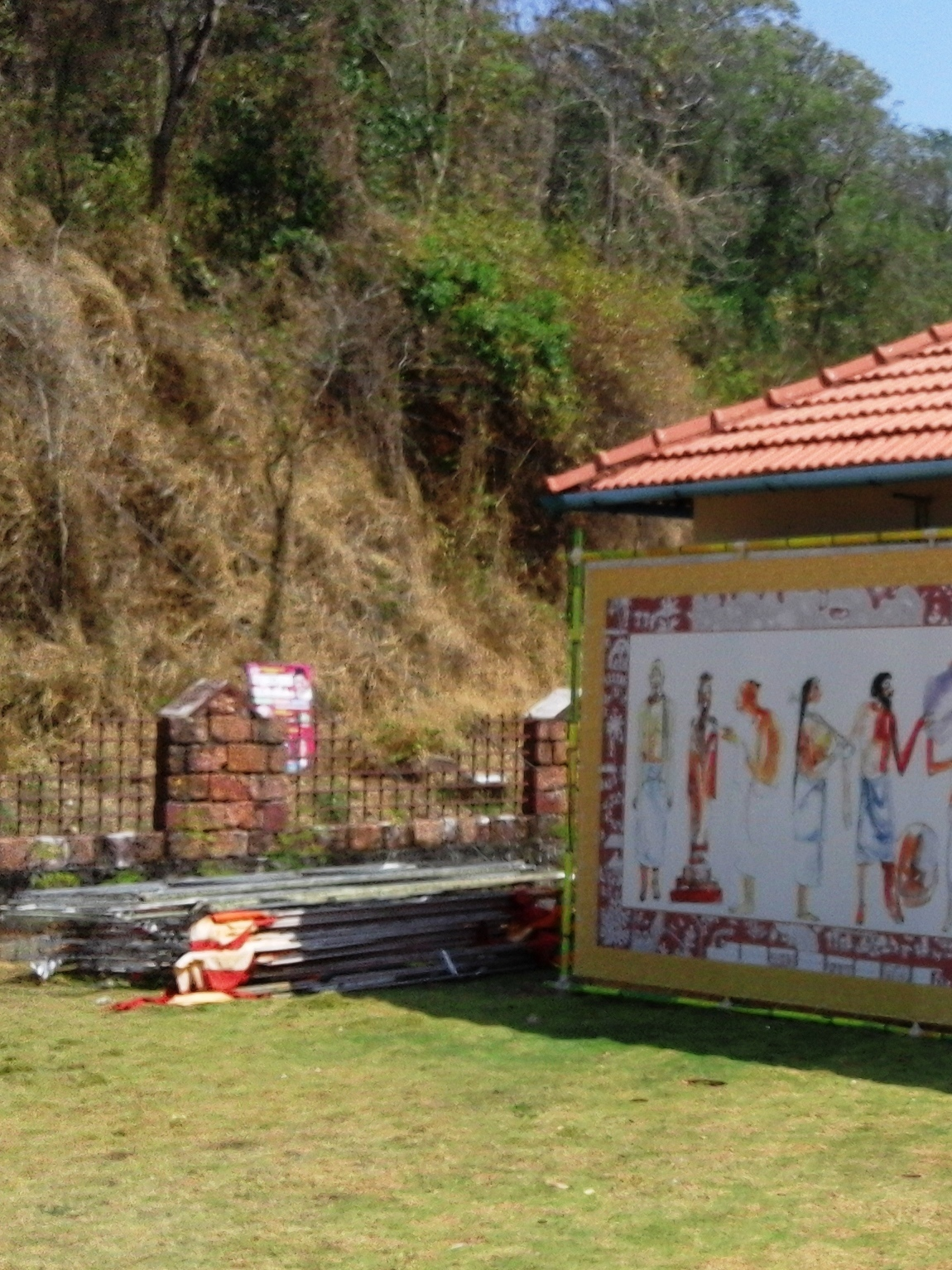
- Veliyamkallu Park
- Interactive map of Thrithala
- Coordinates: 10°48′0″N 76°7′0″E
- Country: India
- State: Kerala
- District: Palakkad

Languages
  - Official: Malayalam, English
- Time zone: UTC+5:30 (IST)
- PIN: 679534
- Telephone code: 91466
- Vehicle registration: KL-9 & KL-52
- Nearest town: Pattambi
- Lok Sabha constituency: Ponnani

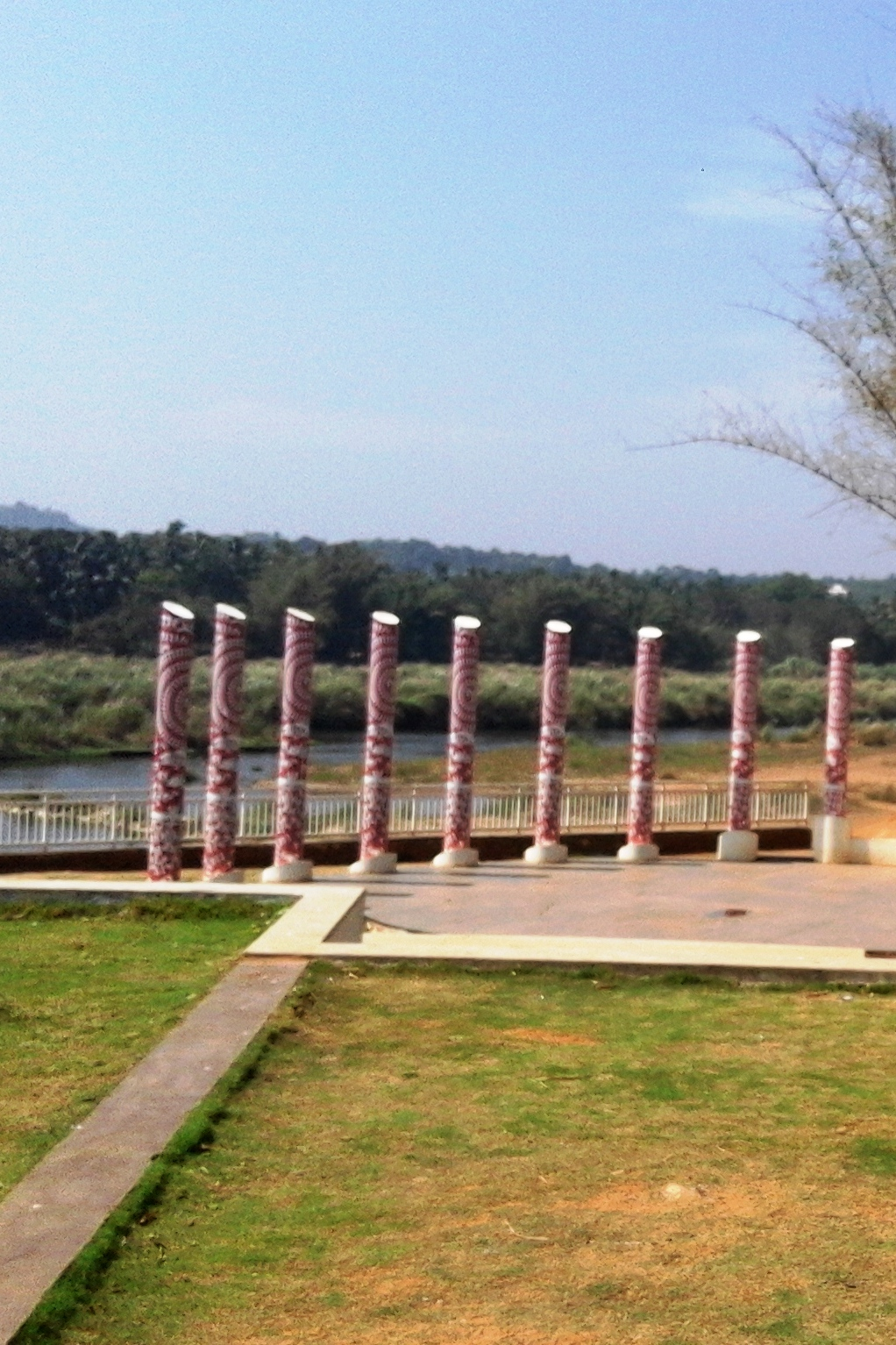
Open Air Theatre

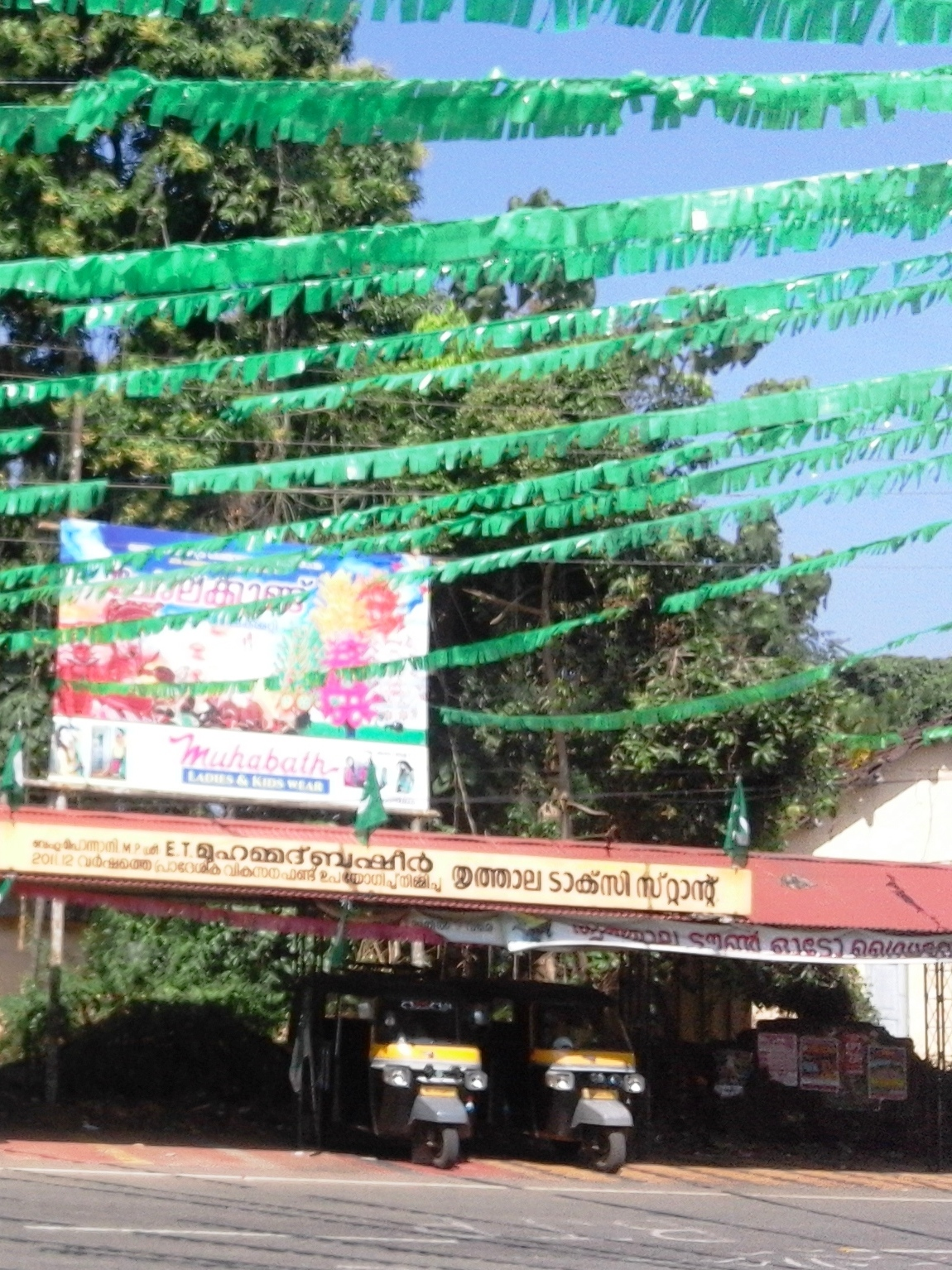
Thithala Taxistand

Thrithala is a town and a village in Pattambi taluk in Palakkad District of Kerala state, India. The town is on the banks of the Bharathapuzha River.

== Politics ==
It belongs to Ponnani Loksabha Constituency current MP is M. P. Abdussamad Samadani. Thrithala is the 49th legislative assembly constituency, current MLA is V. T. Balram of Indian National Congress.
