= Pattambi Taluk =

- Taluk
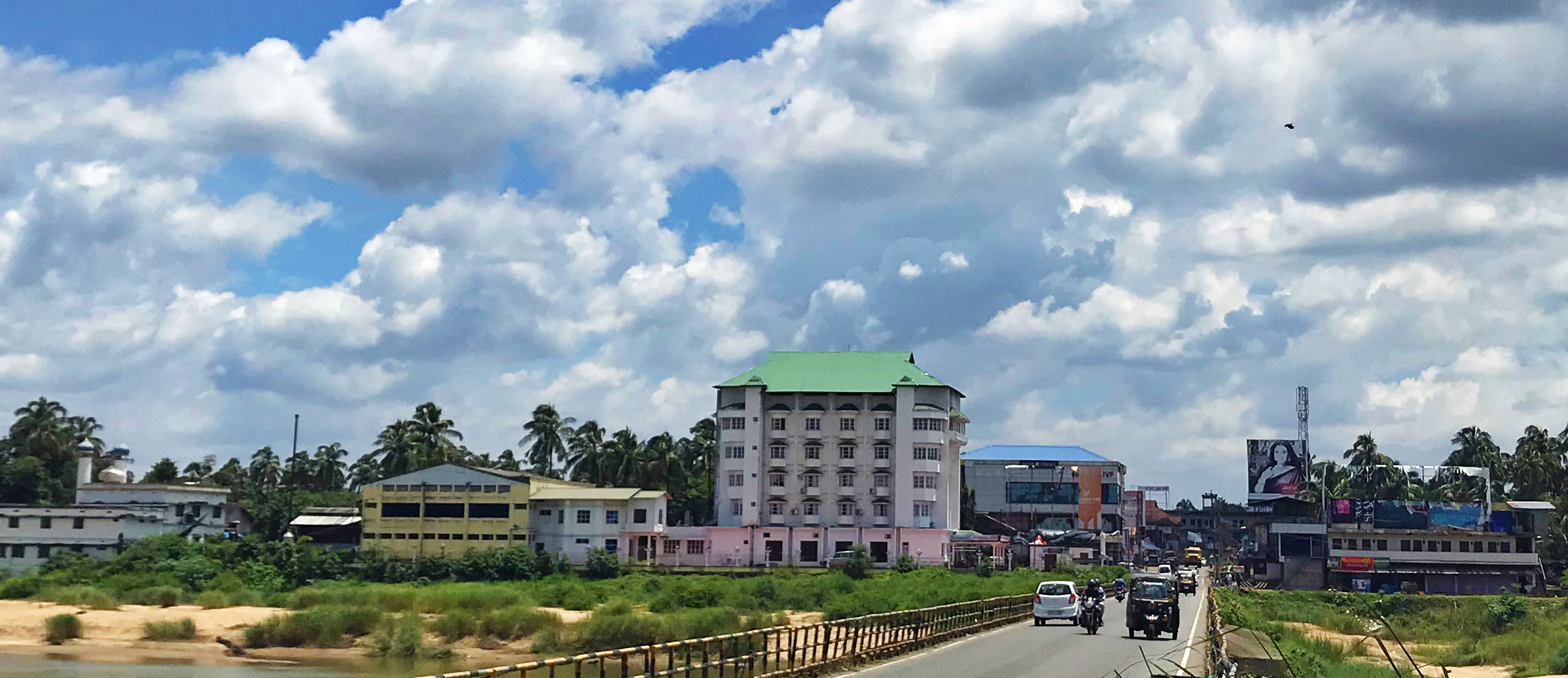
- Famous Pattambi Bridge
- Interactive map of Pattambi Taluk
- Coordinates: 10.7560325°N 76.5731047°E
- Country: India
- State: Kerala
- District: Palakkad District
- Established: 2013 December 23

Area
  - Total: 369 km^{2} (142 sq mi)
- Elevation: 63 m (207 ft)

Population (2011)
  - Total: 467,722
  - Density: 1,270/km^{2} (3,280/sq mi)

Languages
  - Official: Malayalam
- Time zone: UTC+5:30 (IST)

Pattambi is a taluk at the western end of the Palakkad district in the state of Kerala, India. The town of Pattambi is the administrative headquarters of the taluk. Pattambi taluk is bounded by Ottapalam Taluk of Palakkad district to the east, Ponnani taluk of Malappuram district to the west, Tirur and Perinthalmanna Taluks of Malappuram district to the north, and Kunnamkulam Taluk of Thrissur district to the south.

== Villages ==
Pattambi Taluk comprises 18 villages (sub-divisions):

- Anakkara
- Chalissery
- Kappur
- Koppam
- Kulukkallur
- Muthuthala
- Nagalassery
- Ongallur-I
- Ongallur-II
- Parudur
- Pattambi
- Pattithara
- Thirumittacode-I
- Thirumittacode-II
- Thiruvegappura
- Thrithala
- Vallappuzha
- Vilayur

== Demographics ==

As of 2011 India census, Pattambi Taluk had a population of 467722. it is the most densely populated Taluk in Palakkad district.

== History ==
Pattambi Taluk was declared as the sixth taluk in Palakkad district by chief minister Oommen Chandy on 23 December 2013.

Pattambi was a part of Walluvanad Taluk of British Malabar District, which was one of the two Taluks included in Malappuram Revenue Division of British Malabar, and later became part of Ottapalam taluk and on 23 December 2013,Pattambi became independent taluk .

== Notable personalities ==
The following list contains the names of famous people who came from various parts of Pattambi Taluk created in 2013:

- E. Sreedharan
- Akkitham Achuthan Namboothiri
- M. T. Vasudevan Nair
- V. T. Bhattathiripad
- C. P. Mohammed
- Major Ravi
- Govind Padmasoorya
- Anumol
- Manikandan Pattambi
- Kalamandalam Gopi
- M.G. Sasi
- Shivaji (Malayalam actor)

== See also ==
- [[Pattambi]]
- [[Palakkad district]]
