= Pattambi Assembly constituency =

Constituency of the Kerala legislative assembly in India

Pattambi
- Constituency No. 50 for the Kerala Legislative Assembly
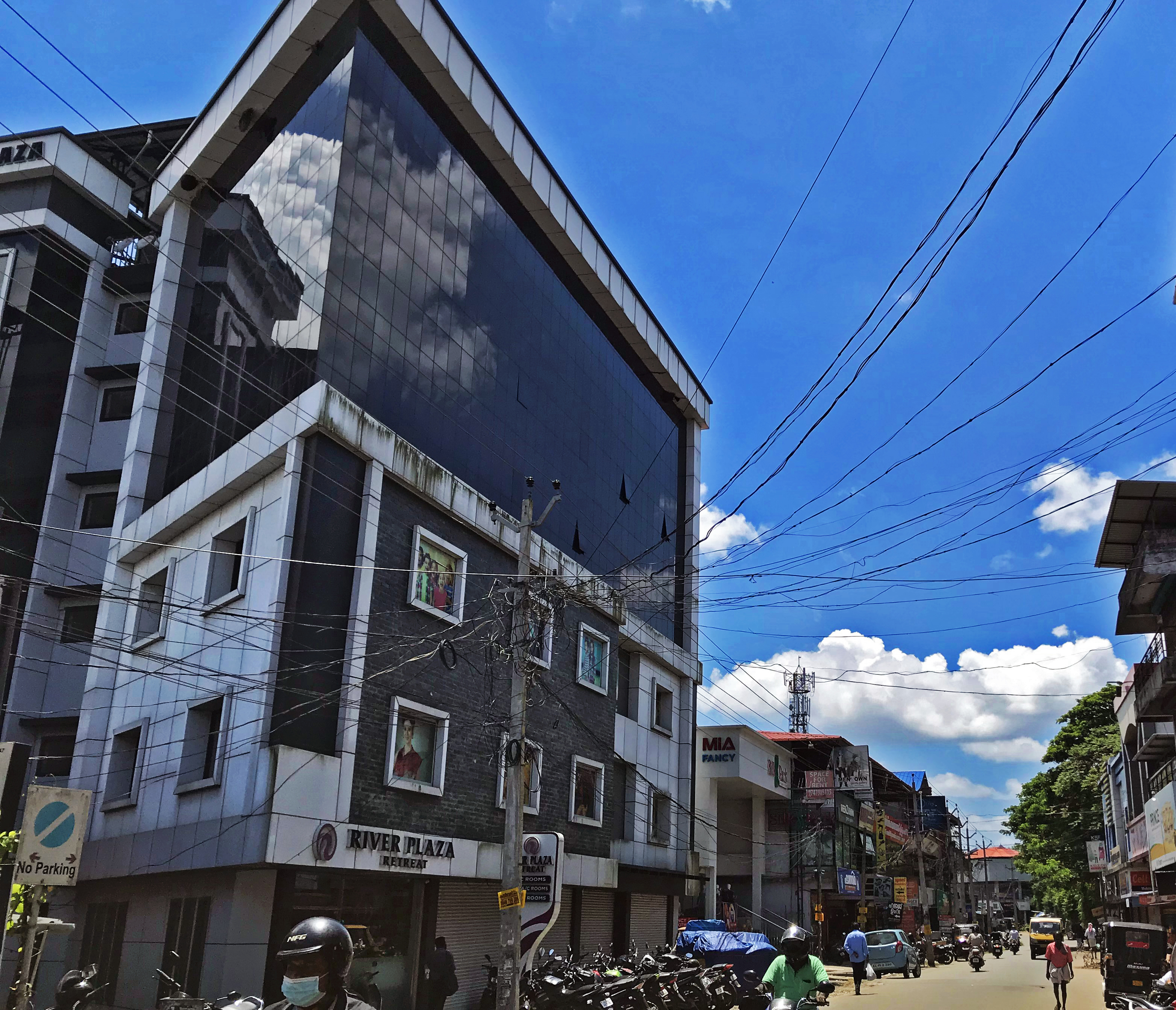
- View of Pattambi town

Constituency details
- Country: India
- Region: South India
- State: Kerala
- District: Palakkad
- Established: 1957
- Total electors: 1,94,858 (2021)
- Reservation: None

Member of Legislative Assembly
- 16th Kerala Legislative Assembly
- Incumbent Muhammed Muhsin
- Party: CPI
- Alliance: LDF
- Elected year: 2026

Pattambi State assembly constituency is one of the 140 state legislative assembly constituencies in Kerala in southern India. It is also one of the seven state legislative assembly constituencies included in Palakkad Lok Sabha constituency. As of the 2026 Assembly elections, the current MLA is Muhammed Muhsin of CPI.

== Local self-governed segments ==
Pattambi Assembly constituency is composed of the following local self-governed segments:

Sl no.	Name	Status (Grama panchayat/Municipality)	Taluk
1	Pattambi	Municipality	Pattambi
2	Koppam	Grama panchayat	Pattambi
3	Kulukkallur	Grama panchayat	Pattambi
4	Muthuthala	Grama panchayat	Pattambi
5	Ongallur	Grama panchayat	Pattambi
6	Thiruvegappura	Grama panchayat	Pattambi
7	Vallapuzha	Grama panchayat	Pattambi
8	Vilayur	Grama panchayat	Pattambi

== Members of the Legislative Assembly ==
Election	Name	Party
1957	E. P. Gopalan	Communist Party of India
1960	E. M. S. Namboodiripad	Communist Party of India
1967	E. M. S. Namboodiripad	Communist Party of India (Marxist)
1970	E. M. S. Namboodiripad	Communist Party of India (Marxist)
1977	E. P. Gopalan	Communist Party of India
1980	M. P. Gangadharan	Indian National Congress
1982	K. E. Ismail	Communist Party of India
1987	Leela Damodara Menon	Indian National Congress
1991	K. E. Ismail	Communist Party of India
1996	K. E. Ismail	Communist Party of India
2001	C. P. Mohammed	Indian National Congress
2006	C. P. Mohammed	Indian National Congress
2011	C. P. Mohammed	Indian National Congress
2016	Muhammed Muhsin	Communist Party of India
2021	Muhammed Muhsin	Communist Party of India
2026	Muhammed Muhsin	Communist Party of India

== Election results ==
Percentage change (±%) denotes the change in the number of votes from the immediate previous election.

=== 2026 ===
2026 Kerala Legislative Assembly election: Pattambi
Party	Candidate	Votes	%	±%
CPI	Muhammed Muhsin	80,062	47.25	▼2.33
INC	T. P. Shaji	70,620	41.68	▲3.94
BJP	P. Manoj	15,282	9.02	▼0.58
SDPI	S. P. Ameer Ali	2,582	1.52	▼0.44
Independent	Muhammed Muhsin M. K.	152	0.09	
Independent	Haris Babu Pailippuram	104	0.06	
Independent	Shajimon	86	0.05	
NOTA	None of the above	548	0.32	▲0.06
Margin of victory		9,442	5.57	▼6.27
Turnout		1,69,436		
CPI hold		Swing	▼2.33	

=== 2021 ===
2021 Kerala Legislative Assembly election: Pattambi
Party	Candidate	Votes	%	±%
CPI	Muhammed Muhsin	75,311	49.58	
INC	Riyas Mukkoli	57,337	37.74	
BJP	K. M. Haridas	14,578	9.60	
SDPI	S. P. Ameer Ali	2,975	1.96	
WPOI	S. Mujeeb Rahman	801	0.53	
BSP	T. P. Narayanan	517	0.34	
NOTA	None of the above	390	0.26	
Margin of victory		17,974	11.84	
Turnout		1,51,909	77.96	
CPI hold		Swing		

=== 2016 ===
There were 1,55,638 registered voters in the constituency for the 2016 election.

2016 Kerala Legislative Assembly election: Pattambi
Party	Candidate	Votes	%	±%
CPI	Muhammed Muhsin	64,025	45.69%	▲7.28
INC	C. P. Mohammed	56,621	40.41%	▼8.59
BJP	P. Manoj	14,824	10.58%	▲3.05
SDPI	Abdul Raoof C.	1,848	1.32%	▼1.86
WPOI	M. A. Moideenkutty	815	0.58%	−
Independent	Muhasin	525	0.37%	−
NOTA	None of the above	435	0.31%	−
PDP	Aboobacker P.	422	0.30%	▼0.31
Independent	Muhammed Cheruvassseri Pallayalil	126	0.09%	−
Independent	Noby Augustine	62	0.04%	−
Margin of victory		7,404	5.28%	
Turnout		1,40,119	77.90%	▲1.25
CPI gain from INC		Swing		

=== 2011 ===
There were 1,53,713 registered voters in the constituency for the 2011 election.

2011 Kerala Legislative Assembly election: Pattambi
Party	Candidate	Votes	%	±%
INC	C. P. Mohammed	57,728	49.00%	
CPI	K. P. Suresh Raj	45,253	38.41%	
BJP	Pookkattiri Babu	8,874	7.53%	
SDPI	K. M. Ashraf	3,742	3.18%	
Independent	Suresh	754	0.64%	−
BSP	Ashraf Ali Vallapuzha	749	0.64%	−
PDP	Maseef Haji	718	0.61%	
Margin of victory		12,475	10.59%	
Turnout		1,17,818	76.65%	
INC hold		Swing		

=== 1952 ===
1952 Madras Legislative Assembly election: Pattambi
Party	Candidate	Votes	%	±%
KMPP	V. Sankara Narayana Menon	14,683	42.02%	
INC	A. Ramachandra Nedungadi	10,361	29.65%	29.65%
Independent	K. Kungu Menon	9,896	28.32%	
Margin of victory		4,322	12.37%	
Turnout		34,940	53.95%	
Registered electors		64,760		
KMPP win (new seat)				

== See also ==
- Pattambi
- Palakkad district
- List of constituencies of the Kerala Legislative Assembly
- 2016 Kerala Legislative Assembly election
