= Thirumittacode =

Thirumittacode may refer to

- Thirumittacode-I, a village in Palakkad district, Kerala, India
- Thirumittacode-II, a village in Palakkad district, Kerala, India
- Thirumittacode (gram panchayat), a gram panchayat serving the above villages
- Thirumittacode inscription, a Chola record from Thirumittacode
