= Perumudiyoor =

Village in Kerala, India

Perumudiyoor is a village situated on the banks of River Bharathappuzha (also known as Nila River), about 1.5 km from Pattambi town, India. Perumudiyoor includes in Palakkad district "Lokhsabha". The village is blessed with many famous temples. Muthassiyar Kavu temple, Cherussery Siva temple, Vadakkekalam SIva temple, Tekkekalam Erinjupuraan Temple, Muthappan temple, Maariamman temple, Eehaapureswari temple are some of them. The great Sree Neela Kanda Sharma's birthplace is Perumudiyoor. The main job of the villagers are farming and business. The Shornur - Mangalapuram rail route goes through the middle of this village.

== See also ==
- Kodumunda
- Muthuthala
- Pattambi
