= Pallippuram, Palakkad =

Pallippuram
- Village
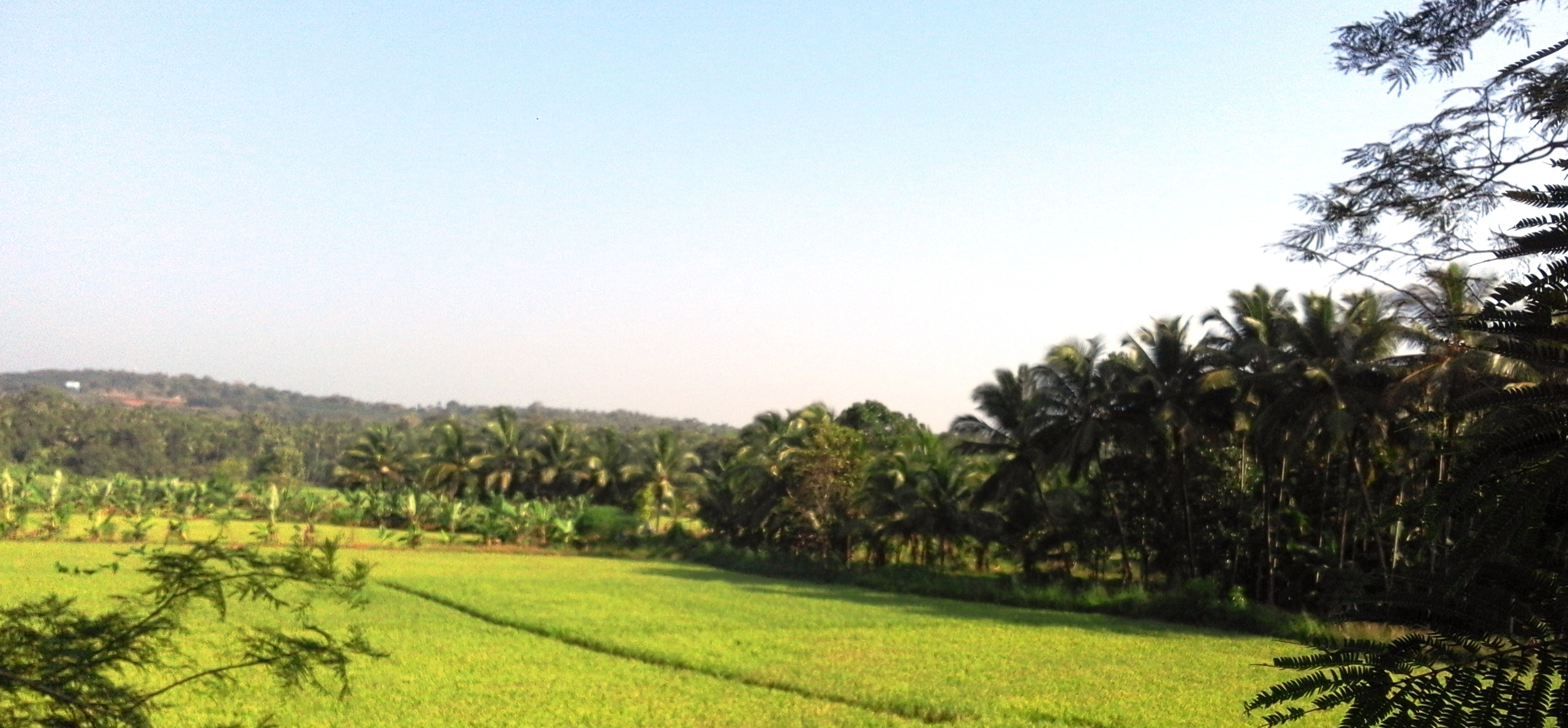
- Pallippuram paddy fields

- Location in Kerala, India Pallippuram (India)
- Coordinates: 10.84057°N 76.11183°E
- Country: India
- State: Kerala
- District: Palakkad

Area
  - Total: 20.71 km^{2} (8.00 sq mi)
- Elevation: 14.83 m (48.7 ft)

Population (2001)
  - Total: 21,809
  - Density: 1,053/km^{2} (2,730/sq mi)

Languages
  - Official: Malayalam, English
- Time zone: UTC+5:30 (IST)
- PIN: 679 305
- Telephone code: 91466
- Vehicle registration: KL-52

Pallippuram is a village near Pattambi, Palakkad district, Kerala, India. Situated in the western extremity ('the western horn') of Palakkad district, part of the greater Paruthur Gramapanchayat, this place stands near the confluence of Bharathapuza River (Nila) and Tutha River (Tuthapuzha), and is bounded by these rivers to the south and west respectively.. The adjacent villages to Pallippuram are Muthuthala, Thiruvegappura, Irimbiliyam, Anakkara, Pattithara, and Thrithala. It falls under the Pattambi Assembly Constituency.

== Demography ==
This village has a population of 21,000 people, where 10,000 are males and 11,000 females as of 2001 India census. The population density is high at 1,053 persons per km^{2}. Muslims comprise approximately 65 per cent of the population, and Hindus the rest. According to the census, the birth rate is 246 and death rate is 5.9 per annum. 88.65% of the population is literate (males: 90.24; females: 83.38).
