= Kuruvattoor =

Kuruvattur Kuruvattoor
- village
- Interactive map of Kuruvattur
- Coordinates: 10°49′13″N 76°16′00″E
- Country: India
- State: Kerala
- District: Palakkad
- Nearest city: Pattambi (Pattambi)

Government
  - Lok Sabha constituency: Palakkad
  - Vidhan Sabha constituency: Pattambi

Languages
  - Official: Malayalam, English
- Time zone: UTC+5:30 (Indian Standard Time (IST))
- Postal Index Number: 679336
- Vehicle registration: KL-52
- Climate: Tropical monsoon (Köppen)
- Avg. summer temperature: 35 °C (95 °F)
- Avg. winter temperature: 20 °C (68 °F)

Kuruvattoor is a village in Palakkad district in the state of Kerala, India. The village shares its borders with Kailiyad, Mundakottukurussi, Vallappuzha and Kanayam. The village in Vallapuzha Panchayat, Pattambi block and Pattambi Taluk is encouraging arts and sports, especially football. Many clubs and local bodies create events for boosting cultural aspects.

== Geography ==
Kuruvattur is geographically divided into 4 regions, [i] Kuruvattur North (Vadakkumuri), [ii] Kuruvattur East (Kizhakkekara), [iii] Kuruvattur West (Chungappilavu), and [iv] Kuruvattur South (Kanayam). And this small village shares borders with Shoranur Municipality in South and Chalavara Grama Panchayat in East. There are two Aided Lower Primary schools and One Upper Primary school in this village and a CBSE school also. The homeopathy health centre of Vallapuzha Panchayat is placed at Kuruvattur.

== Politics ==

Kuruvattoor is part of Palakkad Lok Sabha constituency and Pattambi Legislative Assembly Constituency. It was a part of Valluvanad Taluk in Malabar District of Madras Presidency of British India.

== Air ==
Calicut International Airport, Cochin International Airport and Coimbatore Airport are the nearest airports.

== Train ==
Vallapuzha Railway station and Shoranur Junction railway station are the nearest railway stations.

== Climate ==
Climate data for Kuruvattur, Kerala
Month	Jan	Feb	Mar	Apr	May	Jun	Jul	Aug	Sep	Oct	Nov	Dec	Year
Mean daily maximum °C (°F)	32.8 (91.0)	34.5 (94.1)	35.8 (96.4)	35.1 (95.2)	33.2 (91.8)	29.5 (85.1)	28.6 (83.5)	29.1 (84.4)	30.2 (86.4)	30.8 (87.4)	31.6 (88.9)	32.0 (89.6)	31.9 (89.5)
Mean daily minimum °C (°F)	22.3 (72.1)	23.2 (73.8)	24.8 (76.6)	25.7 (78.3)	25.2 (77.4)	23.6 (74.5)	22.9 (73.2)	23.5 (74.3)	23.5 (74.3)	23.7 (74.7)	23.4 (74.1)	22.4 (72.3)	23.7 (74.6)
Average precipitation mm (inches)	2 (0.1)	12 (0.5)	27 (1.1)	103 (4.1)	211 (8.3)	566 (22.3)	687 (27.0)	349 (13.7)	203 (8.0)	264 (10.4)	136 (5.4)	23 (0.9)	2,583 (101.8)
Source: Climate-Data.org
