= Karuvanpadi =

Karuvanpadi is a village in Pattambi taluk, of Palakkad district in the Indian state of Kerala. It is one of the important trading centres in the area. Karuvanpadi is situated in Parudur panchayath, on Pattambi-Pallippuram road. Its PIN code is 679303.

A diversion from Karuvanpadi centre through Kodumunda road connects Karuvanpadi with the Pattambi–Pallippuram road in Kodumunda centre. Nearby Palathara has a railway crossing known commonly as the Palathara Gate.
