= Kodumunda =

Kodumunda Kodumunda east and west
- village
- Interactive map of Kodumunda
- Coordinates: 10.8203°N 76.1523°E
- Country: India
- State: Kerala
- District: Palakkad

Government
  - Body: Muthuthala Panchayath&Parudur panchayath

Languages
  - Official: Malayalam, English
- Time zone: UTC+5:30 (IST)
- PIN: 679303
- Telephone code: 091-466
- Vehicle registration: KL-52
- Nearest city: Pattambi
- Lok Sabha constituency: Palakkad&Ponnani
- Civic agency: Muthuthala Panchayath&Parudur panchayath
- Climate: Humid (Köppen)

Kodumunda is a small village in Muthuthala and Parudur gramapanchayath, Pattambi Taluk, Palakkad district Kerala. It is a minor trading center in Muthuthala Panchayath. The portions of Kodumunda in Parudur Panchayath are called west Kodumunda. The only railway station in Muthuthala is situated in Kodumunda and is home to four significant temples: Muthassiyarkavu, Cheruneerkara Shiva Temple, Manniyampathoor Saraswathi temple, and Madayil lakshminarasimha temple. Muthassiyarkavu thalapoli and Kodumunda nercha are the major festivals in this village.

== Geography ==
Kodumunda has two parts. The part in Muthuthala panchayath is known as East Kodumunda (Kizhakke Kodumunda in Malayalam), and the other part, in Parudur panchayat, is known as West Kodumunda (Padinhare Kodumunda in Malayalam). The portions are divided by a railway. The infrastructure of the village is divided between the two sections. Mele Kodumunda, Thazhe Kodumunda (in Muthuthala Panchayath) and West kodumunda (parudur panchayath) are considered to be the centers of each.

== Government ==
The eastern part of Kodumunda is situated in the Pattambi assembly constituency and the Palakkad Loksabha constituency. West Kodumunda is in Thrithala under the Ponnani Loksabha constituency.

== Religious centres ==
There are many temples and mosques in Kodumunda. Nedunganad Muthassiyarkavu is one of the most important temples in Kodumunda. Sree Maniyampathur Saraswathi Temple, which is situated in West Kodumunda, is the only Saraswathi temple in Malabar. Kodumunda Jumamasjid west kodumunda juma masjid are the important mosques. Muthassiyarkavu thalapoli, Valavil kshethram (Cheruneerkara Shiva temple) Shivaratri are the major festivals in Kodumunda, and are celebrated annually. Kodumunda Nercha celebrating as national festival is considered as another important festival in the area.

== Education ==
There are many educational institutions near Kodumunda. Govt. HSS Kodumunda is a school in Muthuthala panchayath. GHS Kodumunda West, which is situated in Parudur Panchayath, is another public school. GLPS Kodumunda and AMLPS Kodumunda are two of the institutions providing primary education.

== Health ==
The government Ayurvedic dispensary in Muthuthala Panchayath is situated in Kodumunda. The Muthuthala government hospital is situated two kilometers away from Kodumunda. The people go to Pattambi for further treatment.

== Transportation ==
=== Waterways ===
There used to be a trade link passing through the Bharathapuzha river. Varantakuttikkatavu was a ferry point which connected Thrithala with Kodumunda. Now there is no water transportation available probably due to the construction of the Velliyankallu Dam in 2007. As recently as 2000, small boats and rafts were a typical sight in this area.

=== Road ===
The city is located five kilometers from Pattambi on the Pattambi-Pallippuram Road and can be reached by road or by rail. Kodumunda is of the important place in the route. Pattambi-Pallippuram, Pattambi-Valanchery (via-kodumunda-Muthuthala), and Pattambi-Koppam (via Kodumunda-Muthuthala) buses pass through Kodumunda, though West Kodumunda cannot be reached through this route. The Pattambi-Pallippuram bus on the Theeradesham road is the only way to reach West Kodumunda by bus.

=== Rail ===
Kodumunda is the location of the only railway station in Muthuthala, which is on the way to Kozhikode on the Shoranur–Kozhikode railway line. Only a few passenger trains halt at this station, so the preferable means to reach Kodumunda is by road. Pattambi is the main railway station nearby where most of the trains do stop.

== Nearby towns and important suburbs ==
- Pattambi
- Karuvanpadi
- Pallippuram
- Thrithala
- Koppam
