= Ongallur =

Ongallur may refer to

- Ongallur-I, a village in Palakkad district, Kerala, India
- Ongallur-II, a village in Palakkad district, Kerala, India
- Ongallur (gram panchayat), a gram panchayat serving the above villages
