= Thirumittakode Anchumoorthi Temple =

Hindu temple in Kerala

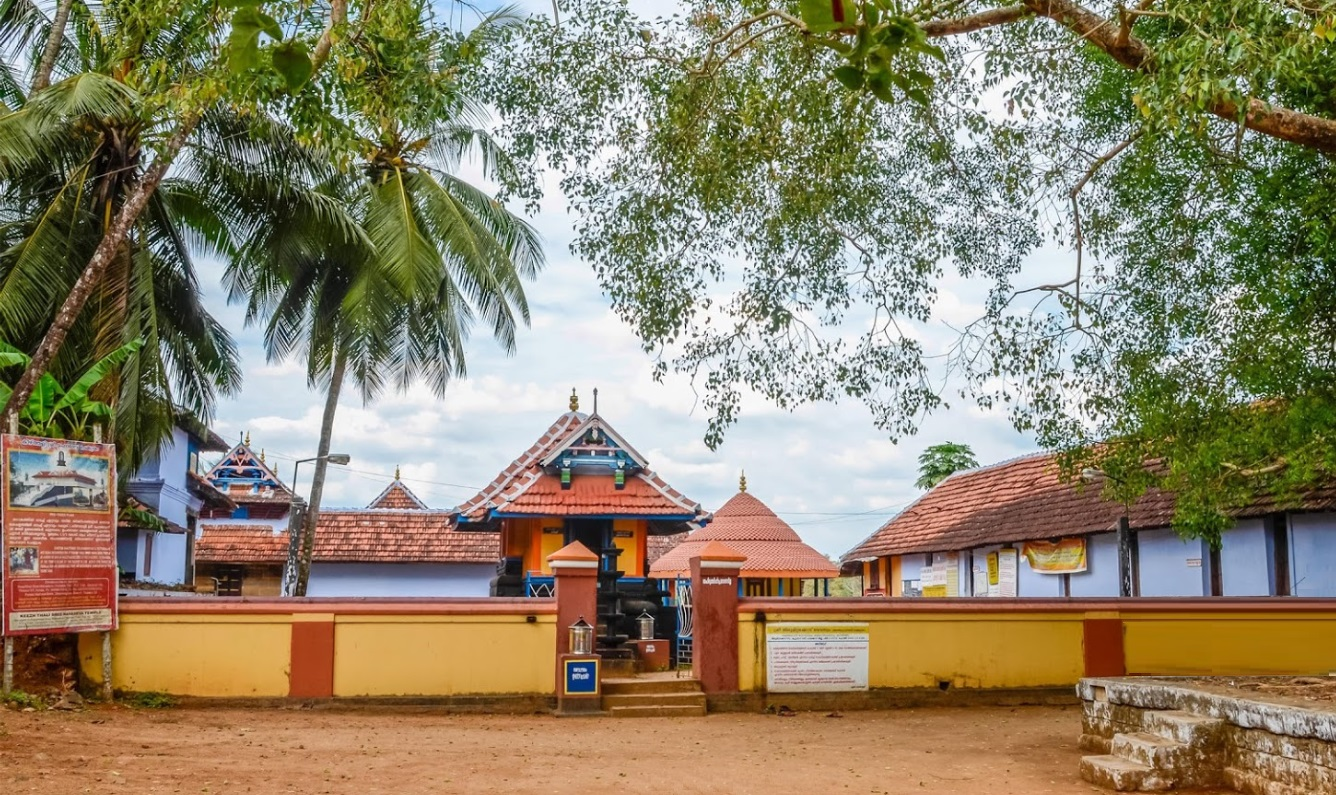

- Anchumoorthi Temple, Thirumittacode, Palakkad, Kerala

Religion
- Affiliation: Hinduism
- District: Palakkad
- Deity: Thiruvithamdappan (Shiva), Abhaya Pradhan (Vishnu), Uyyavantha Perumal (Vishnu), Padmasini (Lakshmi)

Location
- Location: Thirumittacode, Pattambi
- State: Kerala
- Country: India
- Coordinates: 10.783112°N 76.184295°E

Architecture
- Type: Architecture of Kerala
- Completed: 2000-3000 Years old

Specifications
- Temple: 5
- Elevation: 40.11 m (132 ft)

Thirumittakode Anchumoorthi Temple (also called Thiruviththuvakkōdu) is a Hindu temple equally associated with the deities Vishnu and Shiva. Temple is situated on the banks of the Bharathappuzha at Thirumittacode of Palakkad District in Kerala state in India. The five statues - one for Shiva and four Vishnu - are known here as Thirumattikodu five (Anchu) Moorthy Temple.

As a Shiva temple, it is regarded as 108 Shivalayam of Shaivas. Constructed in the Kerala style of architecture, It is one of the 108 Divyadesam dedicated to Vishnu, who is worshipped as Uyyavandha Perumal and his consort Lakshmi as Vithuvakootuvalli.

The Thiruvonam festival and the Vaikunta Ekadasi during the month of Thai are the major festivals celebrated in the temple. The temple is open from 4 am to 11 am and 5 pm to 8 pm and is administered by Travancore Devaswom Board of the Government of Kerala.

The temple contains a rare Chola record of emperor Rajendra I (r. 1012–1044 AD) from Kerala.

== Legend ==
It is believed that this temple is one of the 108 Shiva temples of Kerala and is installed by sage Parasurama dedicated to Shiva. There is another myth in the place, Kasi Viswanathan, a Brahmin who came back after visiting the Kasi darshan, in this temple.

As per Hindu legend, both an elephant and Lakshmi, the consort of Vishnu were worshiping Vishnu with lotus flowers. Once all the lotus flowers were taken away by Lakshmi making Gajendra, the elephant to pray to Vishnu. Vishnu gave a boon to Lakshmi to be along with him and let the whole lotus garden be taken up by Gajendra. The place is a Mumurthi Kshetra as the Trinity of Hinduism, Shiva, Vishnu and Brahma are worshiped here. Hindus perform last rites on the banks of the river in the temple similar to that of Varanasi.

== Architecture ==
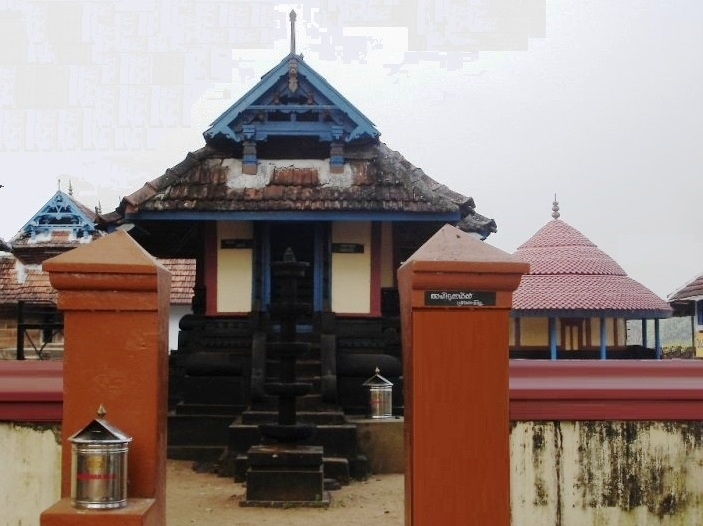
Ganapathy Temple

The temple is about 5 km south of Pattambi in Palakkad district. The Palakkad-Shornur-Kozhikode train route passes through Pattambi. There are five shrines in the temple, one each of Shiva, Vishnu as Abhayapradhan, Vithuvakootuvalli, Vinayaga and Ayyappan. The temple is on the banks of Bharathappuzha at Thirumittacode of Palakkad District in Kerala state in India. The temple is built in Kerala style architecture, common in all temples in the South Indian state of Kerala in Eastern axis. The temple has no gateway tower and has an arch from the main road. A small rectangular wall around the temple, called Kshetra-Madilluka pierced by the gateways, encloses all the shrines of the temple. The metal plated flagpost or Dwajasthambam is located axial to the temple tower leading to the central sanctum. Chuttuambalam is the outer pavilion within the temple walls. The central shrine and the associated hall is located in a rectangular structure called Nallambalam, which has pillared halls and corridors. Between the entrance of Nallambalam to the sanctum, there is a raised square platform called Namaskara Mandapa which has a pyramidal roof. Thevrapura, the kitchen used to cook offering to the deity is located on the left of Namaskara Mandapa from the entrance. Balithara is an altar is used for making ritualistic offering to demi-gods and the festive deities. The central shrine called Sreekovil houses the image of the presiding deity. It is on an elevated platform with a single door reached through five steps. As per Kerala rituals, only the main priest called Thantri and the second priest called Melshanthi alone can enter the Sree Kovil. The central shrine has a circular plan with the base built of granite, superstructure built of laterite and conical roof made of terrocata tile supported from inside by a wooden structure.

== Festivals, religious importance and worship practices ==
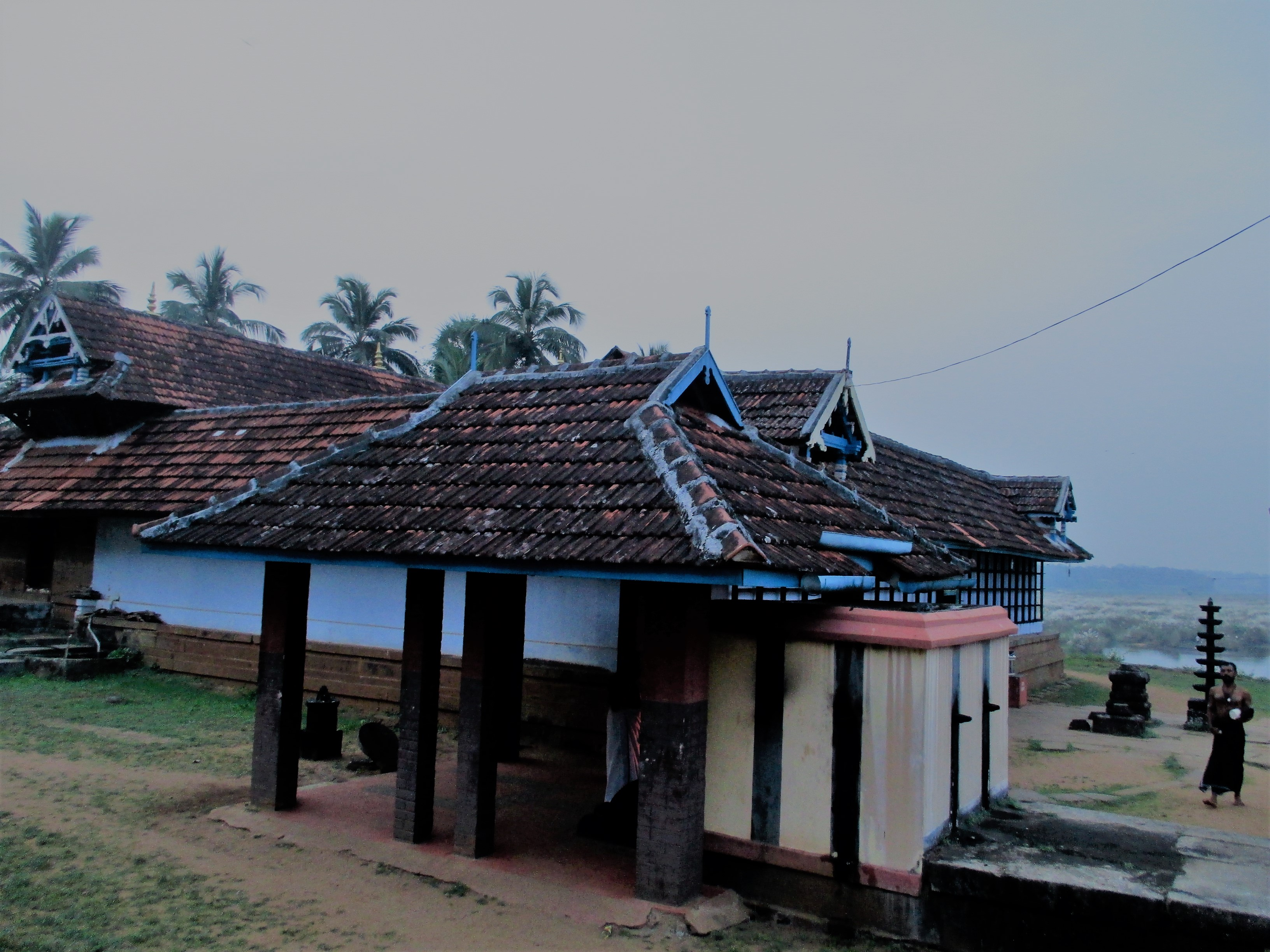
Vishnu temple installed by Nakula-Sahadeva

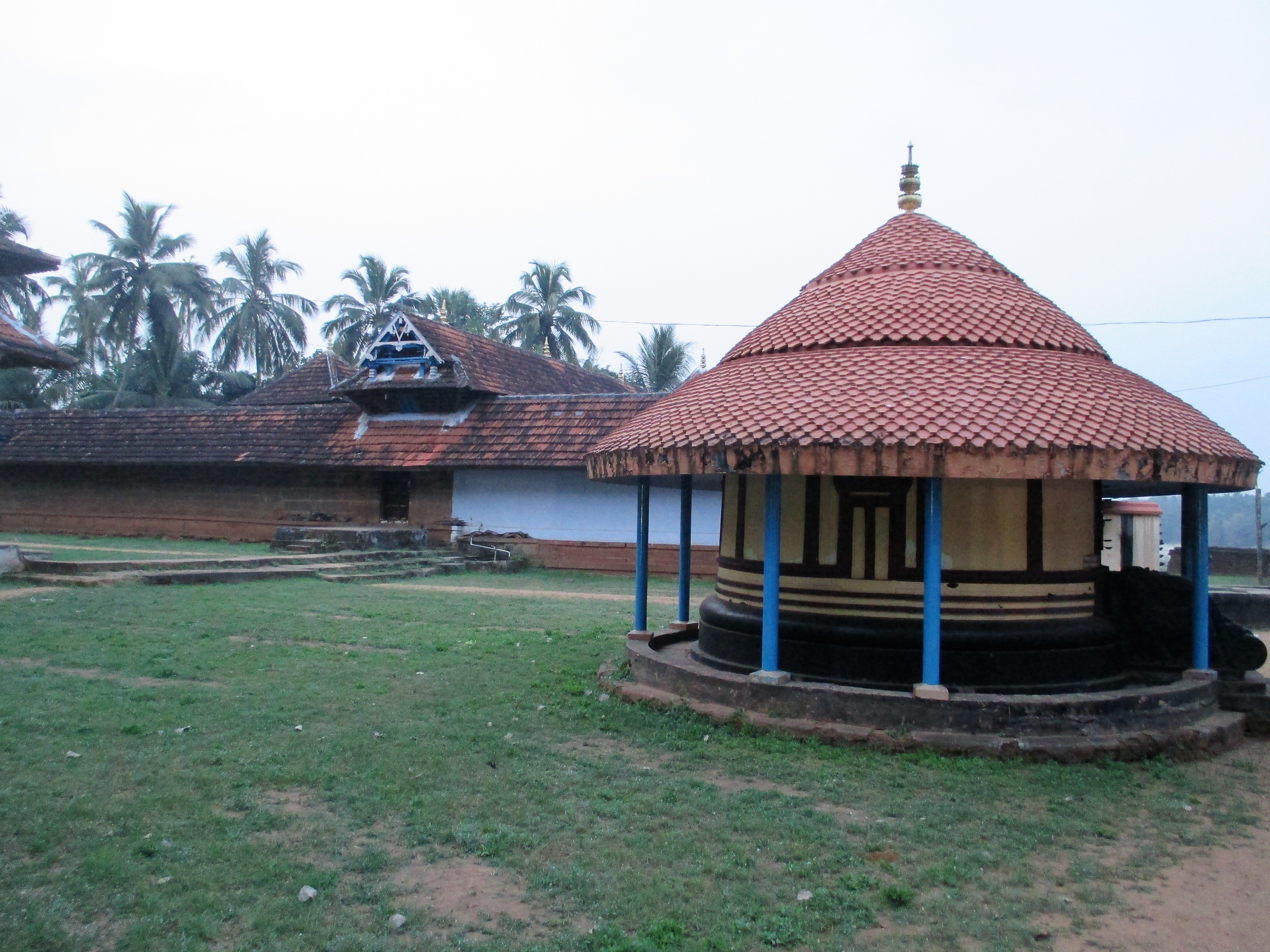
Vishnu Temple installed by Yudishtira

Temples installed by Nakula-Sahadeva and Yudihstria

This temple is one of the "Divya Desams", the 108 temples of Vishnu revered by the 12 poet saints, or Alwars. During Mahabharata period, the Pandavas built the temple here. Arjuna established the temple and this is standing as Moolavar, main deity here. It is said that during Mahabharata period, the Pandavas reached the banks of Bharathapuzha during their exile and installed the idol of Vishnu. It is also said that the Ayodya king Ambareeksha got moksha at Thirumittakode. The Maha Vishnu of the temple is called Abhaya Pradhan Temple or Uyyavantha Perumal Temple. It is believed that Arjuna, one of the brothers, performed penance at this site.

The temple is open from 5 am to 10.30 am and 5 pm to 7.15 pm and is administered by Malabar Devaswom Board of the Government of Kerala. The two major festivals celebrated in the temple are Vaikunta Ekadasi and Thiruvonam. The main annual festival for ten days each year in the month of Medam (April/May). The temple is under the administration of the Malabar Devaswom Board. Abhaya Pradhan is revered in Nalayira Divya Prabhandam, the 7th–9th century Vaishnava canon, by Kulasekara Alvar. The temple is classified as a Divyadesam, one of the 108 Vishnu temples that are mentioned in the book. During the 18th and 19th centuries, the temple finds mention in several works like 108 Tirupathi Anthathi by Divya Kavi Pillai Perumal Aiyangar. The Thiruvonam festival during the Tamil month of Margazhi and the Vaikunta Ekadasi during the month of Thai are the major festivals celebrated in the temple.
