= Vallapuzha =

Vallapuzha Vallappuzha Kaalapparambu
- Panchayath
- Interactive map of Vallapuzha
- Coordinates: 10°50′0″N 76°15′0″E
- Country: India
- State: Kerala
- District: Palakkad
- Established: 1964

Government
  - Type: Local
  - Body: Grama Panchayath

Area
  - Total: 21.64 km^{2} (8.36 sq mi)

Population (2011)
  - Total: 28,018
  - Density: 1,295/km^{2} (3,350/sq mi)

Languages
  - Official: Malayalam, English
- Time zone: UTC+5:30 (IST)
- PIN: 679336
- Vehicle registration: KL-52

Vallapuzha is a village and gram panchayat in Pattambi Taluk, Palakkad district in the state of Kerala, India. Vallpuzha Kalapoot (Bull-Race) is famous across Kerala.

== Demographics ==

As of 2011 India census, Vallapuzha had a population of 28,018 with 13,424 males and 14,594 females.

== Politics ==

Vallappuzha is part of Palakkad Lok Sabha constituency and Pattambi Legislative Assembly Constituency. It was a part of Valluvanad Taluk in Malabar District of Madras Presidency of British India. Late K T Mohammed was the first elected President of Vallappuzha Panchayath. He died on 16/08/1973.

Land Marks

Vallappuzha Railway station

Post office Vallappuzha

Fly Go Tours And Travels Vallapuzha

HSS VALLAPUZHA

State bank of India

Pearl Convention Centre Vallappuzha

== Schools ==
- Vallapuzha GHS
- Vallappuzha HSS
- Vallapuzha Yatheemkhana HS
- Cherukode GLPS
- Cherukode BVA LPS
- Kuruvattoor AMLPS
- Kuruvattoor KMLPS
- Vallapuzha AMLPS
- Vallapuzha KVLPS
- Vallapuzha OALPS
- Vallapuzha VCMLPS
- Kuravattoor KCMUPS

== Vallapuzha Grama Panchayat standing committee ==
- 1 CHOLAMUKKU NK ABDUL LATHEEF- President
- 2 THARAKKALPADI
- 3 APPAMKANDAM
- 4 KALAPARAMBU - CK BABU
- 5 MECHERI - ABDUL RAHEEM
- 6 CHOONGAPPILAVU - FOUSIYA IBRAHIM
- 7 KIZHAKKEKARA (Kuruvattoor) - BINDU SANTHOSH
- 8 ULLAMBUZHA RINISHA UNNI
- 9 MATTAYA
- 10 CHERIKKALLU
- 11 CHOORAKKODE
- 12 PANCHARATHUPADI -
- 13 RAILWAY STATION - PARAKKADAN RAFEEK
- 14 YARAM
- 15 PANNIYAMKUNNU
- 16 MANAKKALPADI

== Transport ==
=== Rail ===
It has a railway station in the Southern Railway network. Every passenger and express trains stop here. It is a station between Angadipuram and Shoranur in Nilambur–Shoranur railway line. There are train services to Ernakulam and Thiruvananthapuram cities also.

=== Air ===
Calicut International Airport, Cochin International Airport and are the nearest airports.

=== Bus ===
Pattambi, cherpulassery, shornur are the nearest Bus stands.

== Climate ==
Climate data for Vallapuzha, Kerala
Month	Jan	Feb	Mar	Apr	May	Jun	Jul	Aug	Sep	Oct	Nov	Dec	Year
Mean daily maximum °C (°F)	32.8 (91.0)	34.5 (94.1)	35.8 (96.4)	35.1 (95.2)	33.2 (91.8)	29.5 (85.1)	28.6 (83.5)	29.1 (84.4)	30.2 (86.4)	30.8 (87.4)	31.6 (88.9)	32.0 (89.6)	31.9 (89.5)
Mean daily minimum °C (°F)	22.3 (72.1)	23.2 (73.8)	24.8 (76.6)	25.7 (78.3)	25.2 (77.4)	23.6 (74.5)	22.9 (73.2)	23.5 (74.3)	23.5 (74.3)	23.7 (74.7)	23.4 (74.1)	22.4 (72.3)	23.7 (74.6)
Average precipitation mm (inches)	2 (0.1)	12 (0.5)	27 (1.1)	103 (4.1)	211 (8.3)	566 (22.3)	687 (27.0)	349 (13.7)	203 (8.0)	264 (10.4)	136 (5.4)	23 (0.9)	2,583 (101.8)
Source: Climate-Data.org
