= Anakkara (Palakkad) =

- Village
- Location in Kerala, India Anakkara (India)
- Coordinates: 10°48′39″N 76°02′48″E
- Country: India
- State: Kerala
- District: Palakkad

Languages
  - Official: Malayalam, English
- Time zone: UTC+5:30 (IST)
- PIN: 679-551
- Telephone code: 0466
- Vehicle registration: KL-52
- Lok Sabha constituency: Ponnani
- Climate: cool and good (Köppen)

Anakkara is a village and grama panchayat in Pattambi taluk, Palakkad district, Kerala, India, bordering Malappuram district. It is located on the southern bank of Bharathappuzha river (Nila, Ponnani River, or Kuttippuram River). Anakkara is located about 8 km south of Kuttippuram town. It was a part of Ponnani taluk until 16 June 1969. The border Grama Panchayats of Anakkara are Kuttipuram and Irimbiliyam in Tirur Taluk, Thavanur, Kalady, and Vattamkulam in Ponnani taluk, and Parudur and Pattithara in Pattambi Taluk.

== Demographics ==
As of 2001 India census, Anakkara had a population of 22,601 with 10,701 males and 11,900 females.

== Suburbs and Villages ==
- Melazhiyam
- Kumbidi & Ummathur
- Panniyur & Nayyur
- Perumbalam
- Mundrakode & DIET Road
- Manniyam perumbalam
- Kudallur & Malamalkavu

== Important Landmarks ==
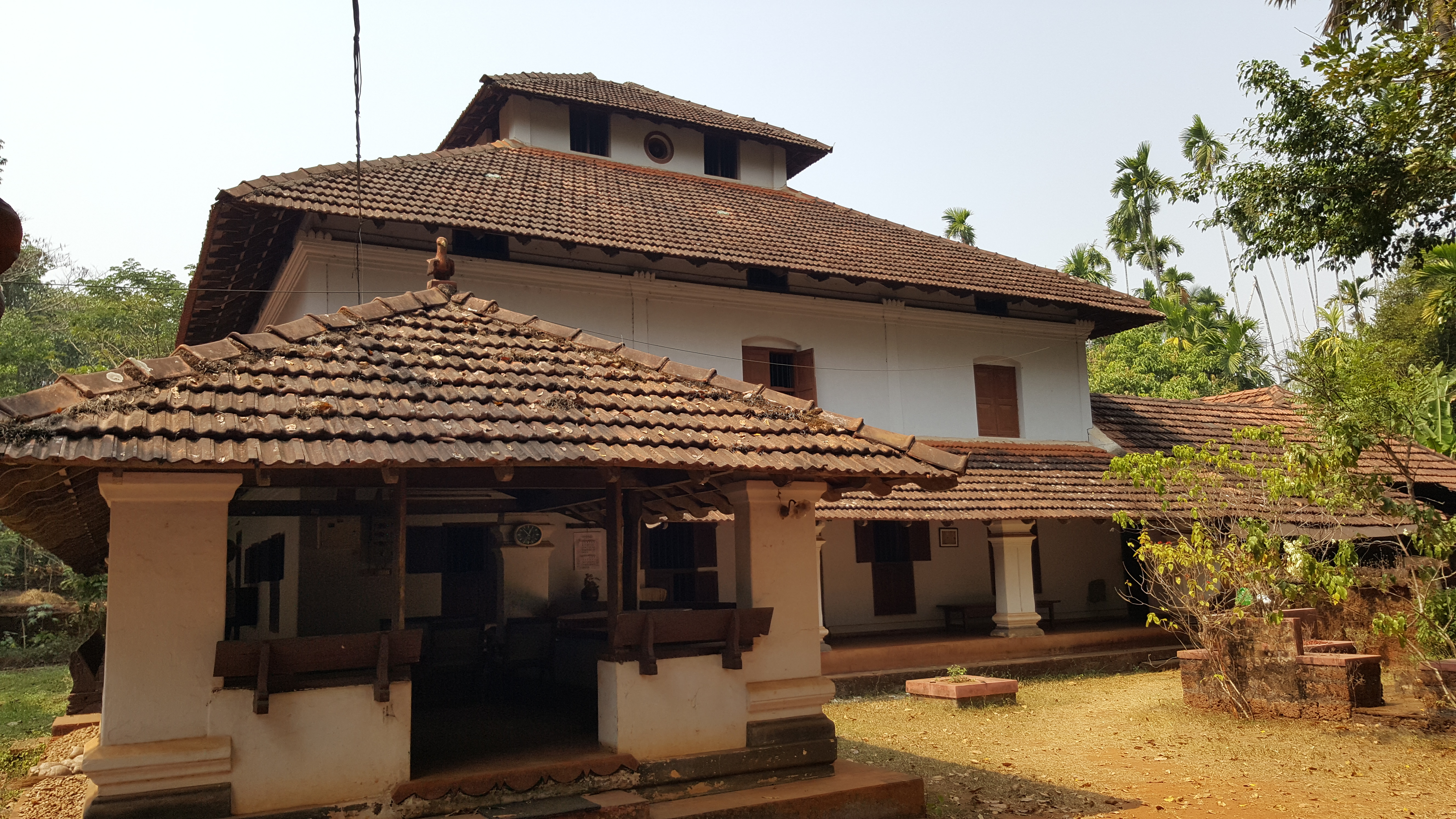
Vadakkath Mana Anakkara

- Panniyur Sri Varahamurthy Temple
- Anakkara Shiva Temple
- Sree Kodalil Vamanamurthi Temple & Bagavathy Temple - Perumbalam
- DIET Lab School (by promoting Swamy Natha Vidyalaya in 1992) https://www.dietpalakkad.org
- GHS School, Anakkara
- AWH Collage Of science & Technology Anakkara
- GTJB School Kumbidi
- Anakkara Vadakkath' Tharavad (Captain Lakshmi's Home)
- Govindakrishna Smaraka Vayanasala

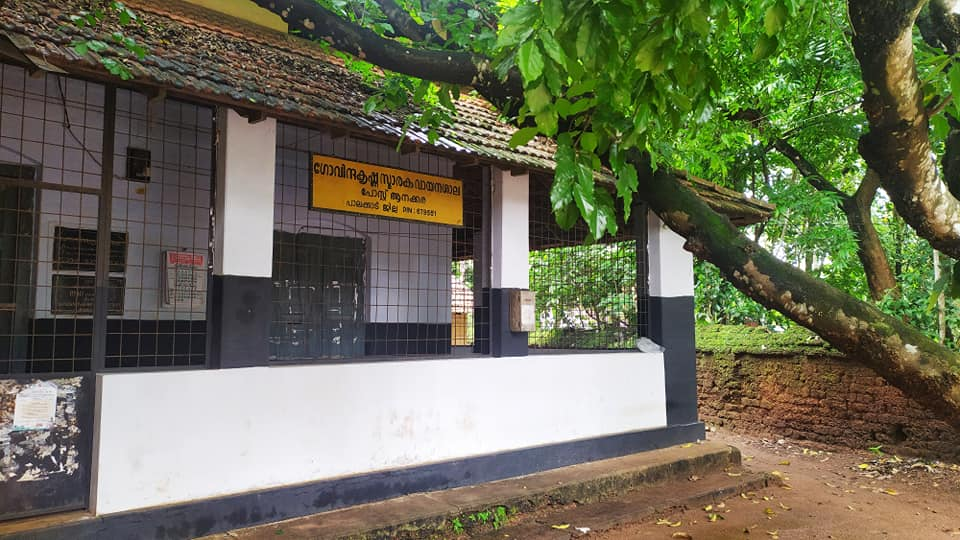
Govindakrishna smaraka vayanasala the public library situated in Anakkara

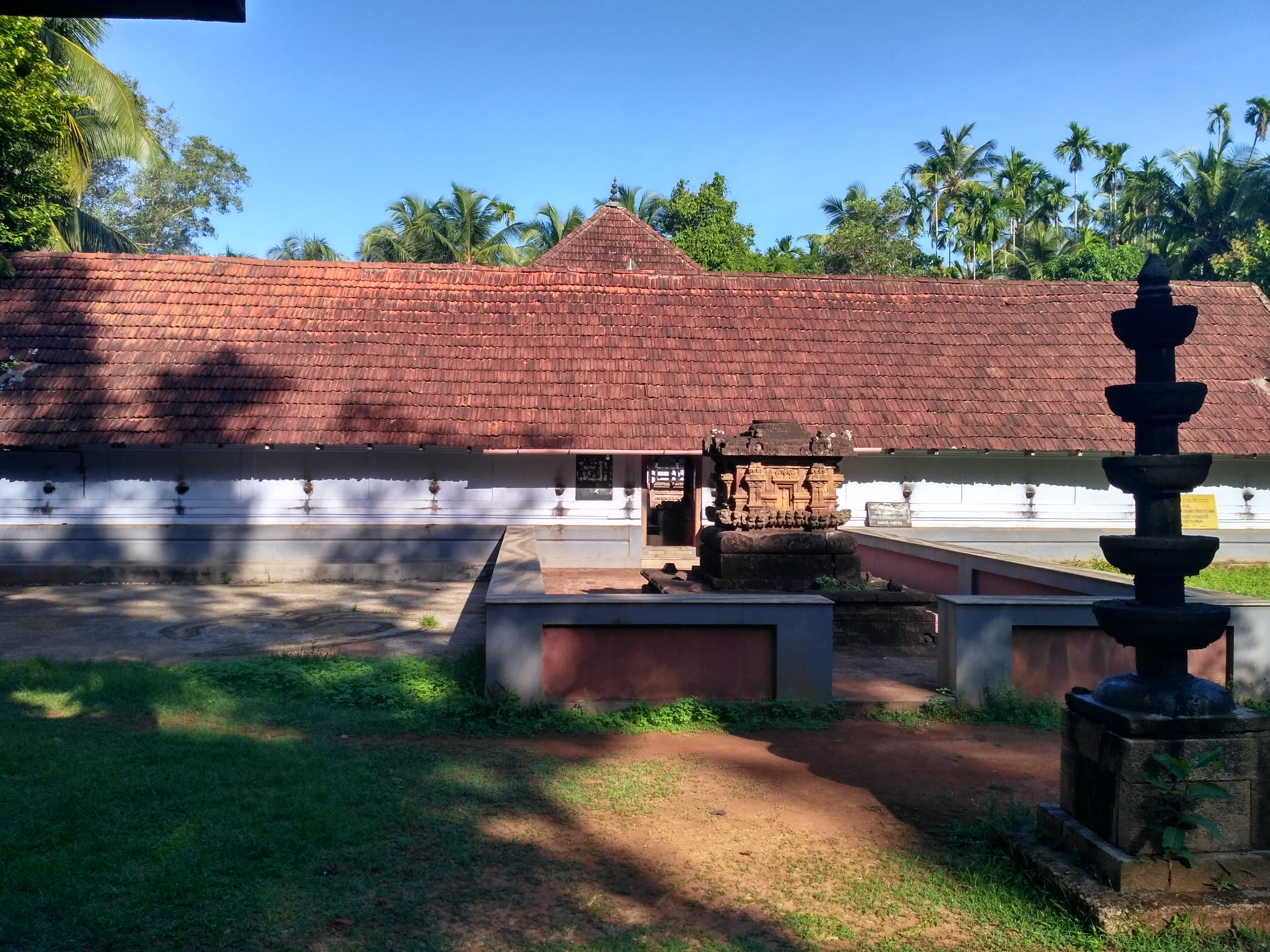
ANAKKARA SHIVA TEMPLE
