= Padinjarangadi =

Village in Palakkad District, Kerala, India

Padinjarangadi is located in the grama panchayath of Pattithara in Palakkad district of Kerala state, India.
