= Mepara Inscription =

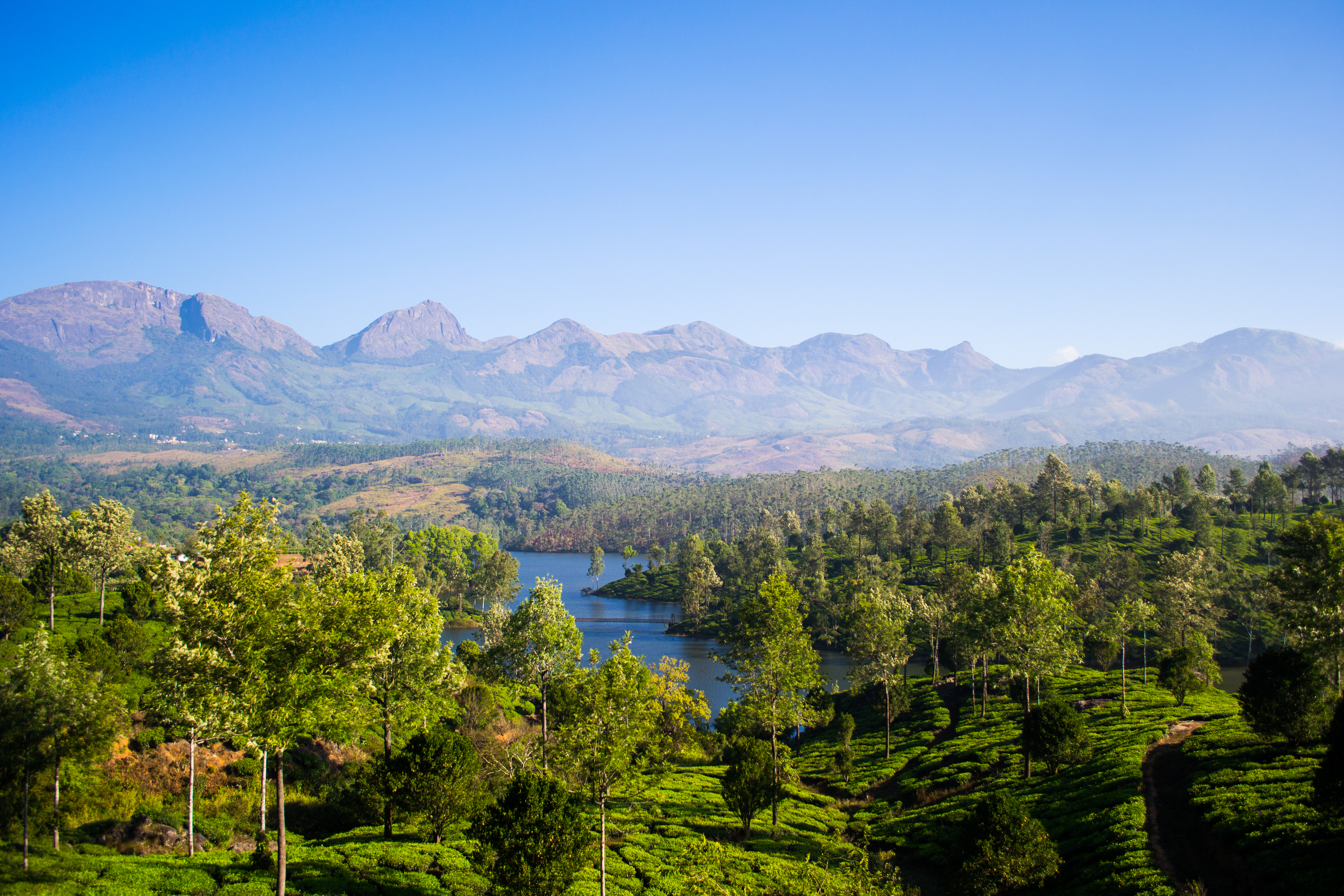
- Rajakumari village
- Material: Granite
- Writing: Tamil
- Created: Early 11th century AD; Idukki District
- Present location: K. P. Tilagar Estate, Mepara

Mepara Inscription (early 11th century AD) is medieval Chola inscription on a menhir on a lateritic hillock in K. P. Tilagar Estate, Meppara, near Rajakumari in Idukki District, Kerala. It is one of the rare Chola inscriptions from Kerala. The record is dated in the 10th regnal year of Rajendra I (ruled 1012-14 AD).

== Description ==
Rajendra I (ruled 1012-14 AD) is known to have controlled the Kerala region in early 11th century AD. Other medieval Chola records from Kerala include Thirumittacode Inscription (Pattambi), and the Eramam Inscription (Payyanur).

Some members of the local community worship the granite menhir (6m x 5 m x 30cm), occasionally with stone lamps and metal bells. It is at times called "Bhimankallu" by the local population. The inscription was first noted by John Ochanthuruth in the 1990s and deciphered by historians Ajit Kumar, K. Rajan and S. Bala Murugan, and S. Siva in 2017.
