= Institute for Communicative and Cognitive Neurosciences =

Neuro-science research center in Kerala

Geography
- Location: Shoranur and Thiruvananthapuram, Kerala, India

Organisation
- Type: Specialist
- Affiliated university: Kerala University of Health Sciences

Services
- Emergency department: Yes
- Speciality: Neuroscience

History
- Founded: 1998

Links
- Website: Official website

Institute for Communicative and Cognitive Neurosciences (ICCONS) is an autonomous not-for-profit neuroscience speciality hospital & research institute established under Health and Family Welfare Department, Government of Kerala. There are two centres, one in Shoranur, Palakkad district and another in Pulayanarkotta, Thiruvananthapuram

== History ==
Institute for Communicative and Cognitive Neurosciences was founded in 1998. In 2015 January it received the NABH accreditation from the Quality Council of India. ICCONS is the first center in India that treats cognitive, speech and language disorders to obtain NABH accreditation.

== Aim ==
ICCONS aims to scientifically diagnose, treat and rehabilitate congenital or non-congenital intellectual and linguistic diseases such as autism, cerebral palsy, dementia, learning disabilities, non-infectious cerebral and neurological paralysis and dementia.

== Description ==
Institute for Communicative and Cognitive Neurosciences (ICCONS) is an autonomous not-for-profit neuroscience specialty hospital & research institute located at Shoranur, Palakkad district. Another centre located in Pulayanarkotta, Thiruvananthapuram. Dr. P. A. Suresh is the founder director of ICCONS. The second director of ICCONS was Dr. Sanjeev V Thomas. The Kerala state Minister of Health is the Chairman of the Governing Council, the Minister of Social Justice is the co-chairman and the Secretary of the Department of Health is the chairman of the executive committee.

Founded in 1998, the institute is led by an integrated team of neurologists, speech-language pathologists, audiologists, clinical psychologists and physiotherapists. language disorders affecting children, autism, Attention deficit hyperactivity disorder, intellectual disability, metabolic genetic disorder, abnormalities of the nervous system, Rett syndrome, Landau–Kleffner syndrome, aphasia and dementia are treated and rehabilitated in the ICCONS. ICCONS is the only institution in India with facilities for the treatment, rehabilitation and research of cerebral neurological disorders and diseases.

On September 25, 2019, ICCONS signed a research collaboration agreement with Indian Institute of Technology Palakkad to carry out a research and development programme on Assistive and Rehabilitation Technology.

== Courses conducted ==
- Bachelor of Audiology and Speech Language Pathology (BASLP), a four-year degree course
- Master In Audiology And Speech Language Pathology (MASLP)

== See also ==
- National Institute of Mental Health and Neurosciences
- Institute of Mental Health and Neurosciences
