= Thirumittacode inscription =

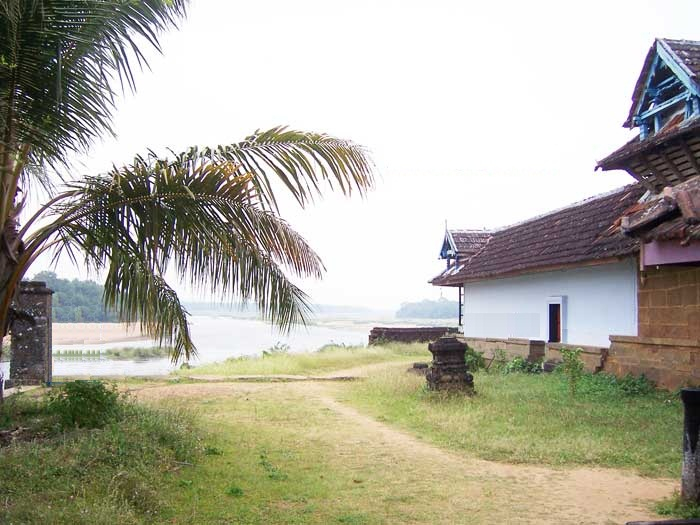
- Thirumittacode Temple
- Material: Granite
- Writing: Early Malayalam
- Created: c. 1028 AD; Kerala
- Present location: Thirumittacode Temple

Thirumittacode inscription (c. 1028 AD) is an early 11th century Chola inscription from Thirumittacode, near Pattambi (opposite to the Palghat Gap, on south bank of Bharathappuzha), in central Kerala. The old Malayalam inscription in Vattezhuthu script (with additional Grantha characters) is engraved on the obverse side of a single granite block in the door frame of the Thirumittacode Temple. The epigraph is one of the rare Chola records found in Kerala proper.

- The inscription, dated in the 8th regnal year of medieval Chera king Ravi Goda (fl. 11th century AD), relates to the rule of Chola emperor Rajendra (r. 1012–1044 AD) in Kerala. Rajendra I (ruled 1012-14 AD) is known to have controlled the Kerala region in early 11th century AD.
- It records the gift of gold equal to forty "pazhankashu" to the Thirumittacode Temple by "Chola Mutharaiyan" named Chekkizhan Shakthinjayan from Kavanur, Melur Kottam in Thondai Nadu, who was carrying out the royal orders of emperor Rajendra Chola.
- The same donor is mentioned in one inscription from the temple of Mahadeva at Thiruchathurai (Odanavaneshwara Temple), in Tanjavur Taluk. It records an agreement given by the temple servants (pathipathamulathar) to burn a perpetual lamp for 25 kazhainju of pure tested gold received by them from Chekkizhan Shakthimalaiyan alias "Chola Mutharaiyan" of Kavanur in Melur Kottam.
- The record mention the old Malayalam name of the temple as "Thiruvitruvacode". It also notes the so-called "Agreement of Muzhikkulam".

== See also ==
- Mepara Inscription
