= C. P. Mohammed =

Indian politician (born 1952)

- സി.പി. മുഹമ്മദ്‌

Member of Legislative Assembly, Kerala
- In office 2001–2016
- Preceded by: K. E. Ismail
- Succeeded by: Muhammed Muhsin
- Constituency: Pattambi

Personal details
- Party: Indian National Congress

C.P. Mohammed (Malayalam: സി.പി. മുഹമ്മദ്‌) (born 15 August 1952) is an Indian politician and was the MLA of Pattambi from 2001 to 2016.

He is the son of Shri C.P. Mohammed Haji and Smt. Beevi Fathima.
