= Thirumittacode Gram Panchayat =

Gram Panchayat in Palakkad district of Kerala, India

Thirumittacode is a gram panchayat in the Pattambi taluk, Palakkad district, state of Kerala, India. It is a local government organisation that serves the villages of Thirumittacode-I and Thirumittacode-II.

== See also ==
- Thirumittacode inscription
