= Thiruvegappura =

- village
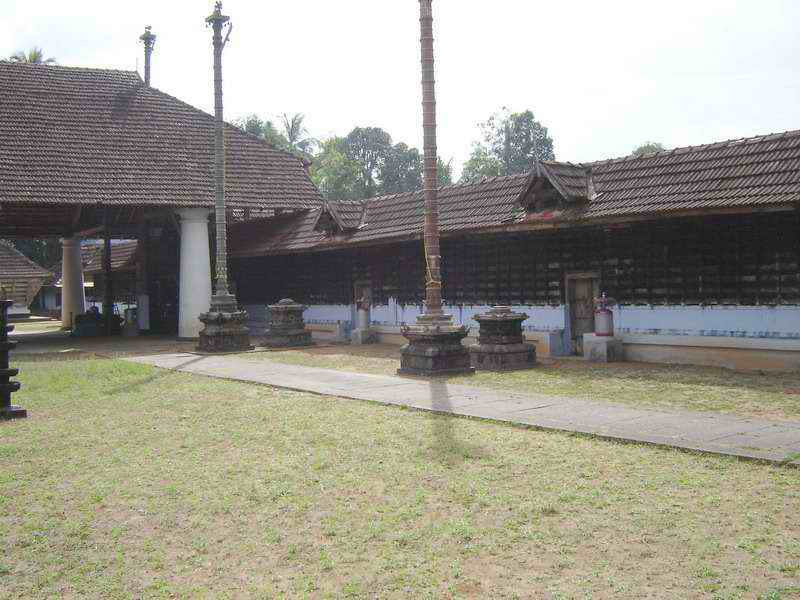
- Thiruvegappura Temple

- Location in Kerala, India Thiruvegappura (India)
- Coordinates: 10.873°N 76.125°E
- Country: India
- State: Kerala
- District: Palakkad

Government
  - Body: Grama Panchayat

Population (2011)
  - Total: 33,942

Languages
  - Official: Malayalam, English
- Time zone: UTC+5:30 (IST)
- PIN: 679 304
- Telephone code: 0466
- Vehicle registration: KL-52
- Lok Sabha constituency: Palakkad
- Vidhan Sabha constituency: Pattambi
- Civic agency: Grama Panchayat

Thiruvegappura (also spelled Thiruvegapura) is a village in Pattambi Taluk Palakkad district in the state of Kerala, India. It is administered by the Thiruvegapura gram panchayat.

The main roads passing through Thiruvegappura Panchayat are Ponnani - Palakkad road, Pattambi - Perinthalmanna Road, Pattambi - Valanchery road, and Pattambi - Kozhikode road. Tirur - Shornur Railway line and Nilambur-Shoranur line pass through here. The nearest Municipal towns are Pattambi and Valanchery.

The villages lies on the bank of river Thutha, a tributary to the Bharathapuzha River.

== Demographics ==
As of 2011 India census, Thiruvegapura had a population of 33,942 with 16,425 males and 17,517 females.
