= Muhammed Muhsin =

CPI kerala

Muhammed Muhassin P.
- മുഹമ്മദ് മുഹസ്സിൻ പി
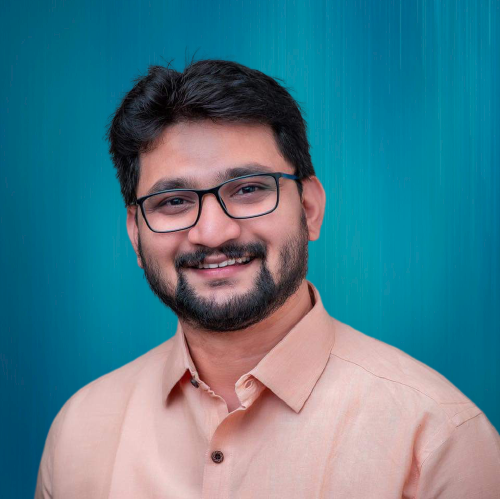
- Muhsin took oath as MLA in Legislative Assembly

Member of the Kerala Legislative Assembly
- Incumbent
- Assumed office 2 June 2016
- Preceded by: C. P. Mohammed
- Constituency: Pattambi

Personal details
- Born: 17 February 1986 (age 40)
- Party: Communist Party of India
- Website: muhammedmuhassin.com

Muhammed Muhassin (born 17 February 1986) also known as Muhammed Muhassin is an Indian politician and a Member of 14th Kerala Legislative Assembly from Pattambi Constituency in Palakkad district. He is the youngest MLA in 14th Kerala Legislative Assembly. He defeated the three-term senior Congress Party MLA, CP Mohammed with a margin of 7404 Votes in 2016 Kerala Assembly Election.

== Education ==
Muhsin is a research scholar from Jawaharlal Nehru University. He graduated in Electronics and Computer Applications from H.M. College Manjeri and completed his master's in social work from Amrita Vishwa Vidyapeetham, Coimbatore and his MPhil from University of Madras.

== Family ==
Muhsin is second of seven children of Puthen Peediyakkal Aboobecker Haji and Jameela Beegam from Ongallur panchayat and also he is the grandchild of Islamic scholar Karakkad Manu Musliar.

== Political career ==
Muhsin, a student of School of Social Science at Jawaharlal Nehru University, Delhi, was the vice president of AISF in university, and a college mate of JNU Student Union president Kanhaiya Kumar.
