= K. E. Ismail =

Indian politician

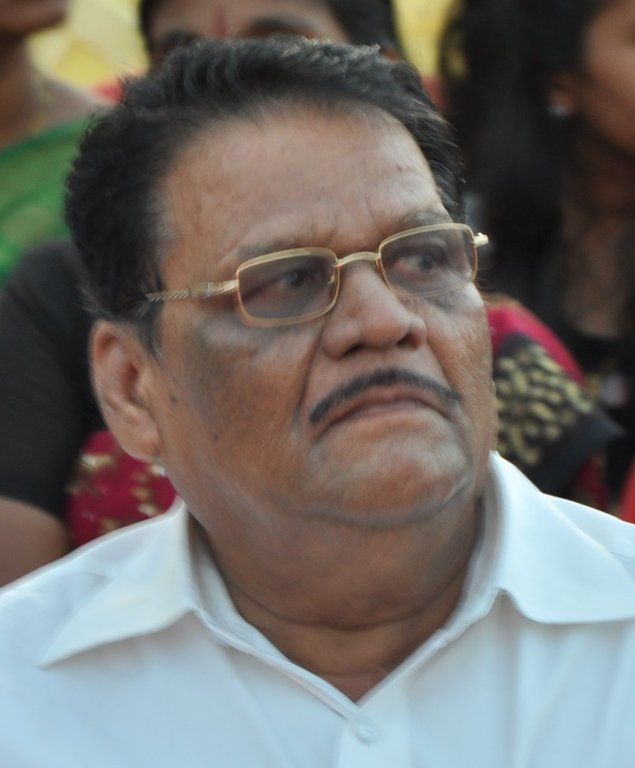

Minister for Revenue, Government of Kerala
- In office 20 May 1996 – 13 May 2001

Personal details
- Born: 10 August 1941 (age 84)
- Party: Communist Party of India
- Spouse: M. K. Sabi
- Children: 2 sons, 1 daughter

K. E. Ismail is a leftist politician from Kerala, India (Communist Party of India). He was a Member of the Parliament of India Rajya Sabha, the upper house of Indian Parliament representing Kerala, India. He was Revenue minister in Kerala State during 1996 to 2001. He represented Pattambi constituency in Kerala Legislative Assembly during the periods of 1982 to 1987, 1991 to 1996 and 1996 to 2001. Shri. K.E. Ismail, senior CPI leader, was born on 10 September 1941 as the son of Shri. K. C. Ebrahim.

He entered politics through the students movement in 1956. Later, during 1962-64 he served in the Indian Army. However, he was dismissed from service for being a Communist. He is actively associated with the BKMU affiliated to the Communist Party of India.
