= Mavundirikadavu =

Mavundirikadavu is a small village in the Palakkad district of Kerala state, south India, and it belongs to Nellaya Panchayath in Pattambi Thaluk, and the Shornur Assembly (Vidhan Sabha) Constituency.
