= E. P. Gopalan =

Indian politician

E. P. Gopalan (1912 - 1 November 2001) was an Indian politician and leader of Communist Party of India. He represented Pattambi constituency in the 1st and 5th Kerala Legislative Assembly and Perinthalmanna constituency in the 2nd Kerala Legislative Assembly.

He entered politics in the 1930s participating in several local struggles. In 1939 he joined the Communist Party of India. In 1939, he spent 21 months in prison for preaching against the war. He has also served as the Malabar District Board Member, Palakkad District Karshaka Sangam President and the first Non-Official Chairman of Agro Industries.

He died on 1 November 2001.
