= Vilayur =

- village
- Location in Kerala, India Vilayur (India)
- Coordinates: 10°53′0″N 76°11′0″E
- Country: India
- State: Kerala
- District: Palakkad

Population (2011)
  - Total: 23,389

Languages
  - Official: Malayalam, English
- Time zone: UTC+5:30 (IST)
- PIN: 679309
- Vehicle registration: KL-52

Vilayur is a village and gram panchayat in Pattambi, Palakkad district in the state of Kerala, India.

== Culture ==
Vilayur lies within the cultural landscape of the Valluvanad region, historically associated with traditional Sanskrit learning and Ayurveda.

The neighbouring region of Pulamanthole is associated with Kerala's traditional Ashtavaidya Ayurvedic heritage, including the Pulamanthole Mooss lineage.

== Demographics ==
As of 2011 India census, Vilayur had a population of 23,389 with 10,831 males and 12,558 females.
