= Chalavara =

- Village
- Location in Kerala, India Chalavara (India)
- Coordinates: 10.824350°N 76.2993300°E
- Country: India
- State: Kerala
- District: Palakkad

Population (2011)
  - Total: 23,466

Languages
  - Official: Malayalam, English
- Time zone: UTC+5:30 (IST)
- PIN: 679505
- Telephone code: 0466
- Vehicle registration: KL-51
- Nearest city: Shoranur
- Literacy: 92.14%
- Lok Sabha constituency: Palakkad
- Vidhan Sabha constituency: Shoranur
- Climate: hot (Köppen)

Chalavara is a village and gram panchayat in Palakkad district, Kerala, India.

It is the location of the K. T. N. College of Pharmacy.

== Demographics ==
As of 2011 India census, Chalavara had a population of 23,466 with 11,097 males and 12,369 females.
