= Shoranur =

- Town
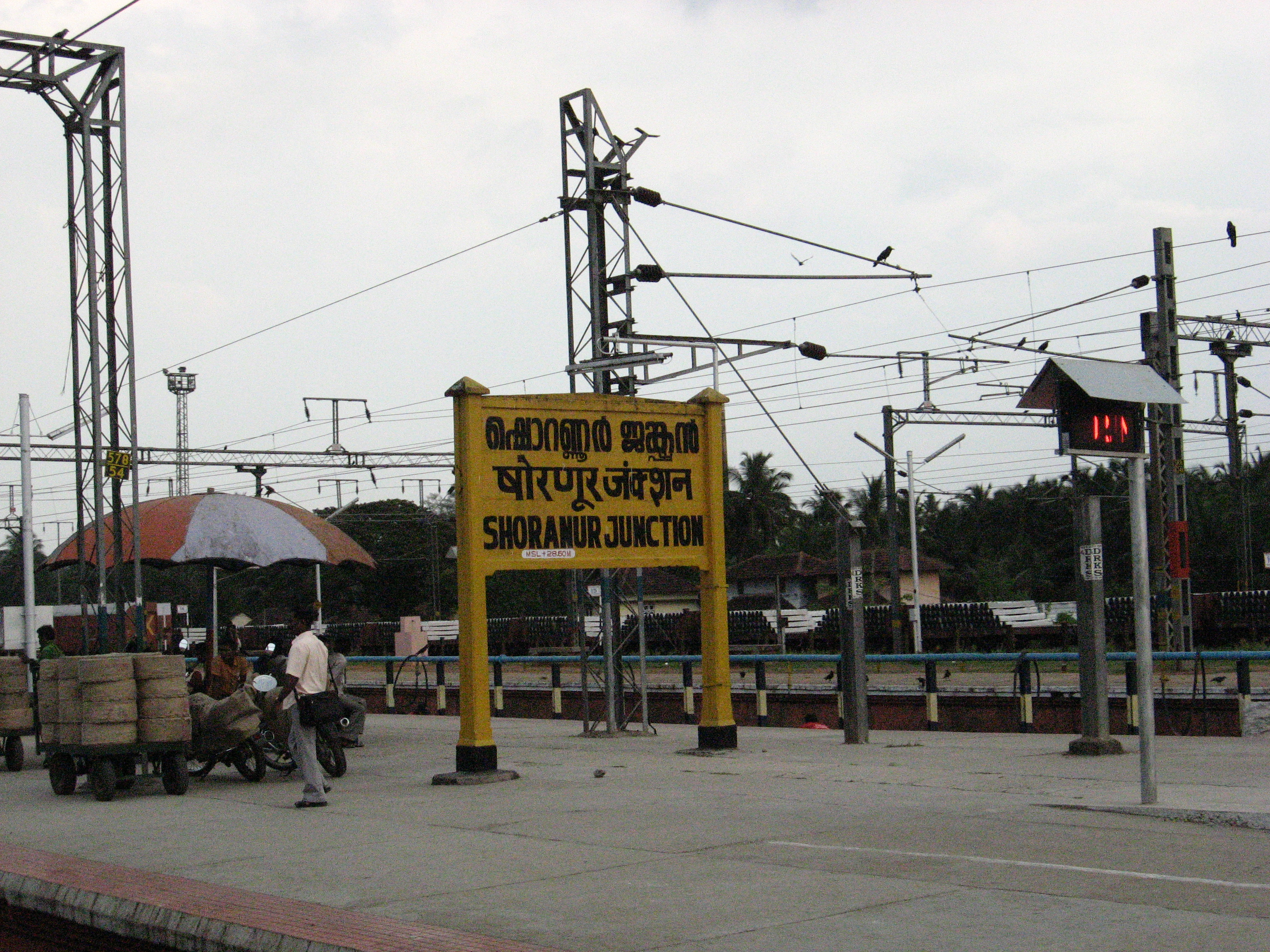
- Shoranur Junction railway station, the largest railway station in the state in terms of area.

- Location within Kerala Location within India
- Coordinates: 10.77°N 76.28°E
- Country: India
- State: Kerala
- District: Palakkad

Government
  - Body: Municipality
  - Chairperson: M. K. Jayaprakash

Area
  - Total: 32.28 km^{2} (12.46 sq mi)
- Elevation: 49 m (161 ft)

Population (2011)
  - Total: 43,533
  - Density: 1,349/km^{2} (3,493/sq mi)

Languages
  - Official: Malayalam, English
- Time zone: UTC+5:30 (IST)
- PIN: 679121
- Telephone code: 0466
- Sex ratio: 1000:1096 ♂/♀
- Website: www.shornurmunicipality.in

Shoranur (Malayalam: [ʂorɳuːr]) is a town and municipality located on the banks of the Bharathapuzha River, in the Palakkad district of Kerala. The town is spread over an area of 32.28 km^{2}.

== Geography ==
Shoranur is located at 10.77°N 76.28°E. It has an average elevation of 49 metres (160 feet).

== History ==
This place was originally a part of the Nedunganad Swaroopam dynasty, which ruled over the present-day Pattambi and Ottapalam Taluks. By the end of the 15th century CE, Nedunganad came under the Zamorin of Calicut. The Chieftains of Shoranur known as the Kavalappara Moopil Nair maintained his territory as a buffer zone between the Zamorin and the Rajas of kochi often taking sides keeping in mind his personal interests of the time . With the annexation of Malabar by the British Kavalappara became part of Walluvanad Taluk of Malabar District, with the Taluk headquarters at Perinthalmanna.

== Politics ==
Shoranur became a municipality in 1978 and is divided into 33 electoral wards. It is a part of Shoranur Legislative Assembly Constituency and Palakkad Parliamentary Constituency. Shoranur assembly constituency was formed in 2011. Before that Shoranur municipality was under Pattambi assembly constituency.

== Transport ==
Shoranur well connected by road to the nearest cities of Thrissur and Palakkad . SH 22 which is also called the Shoranur - Kodungallur road passes through Thrissur, while the Ponnani - Palakkad road passes through Kulappully.

There are regular bus services to Ottapalam, Thrissur, Chelakkara, Pattambi and Cherpulassery from shoranur. Kulappully serves buses from Palakkad and Guruvayur.

Shoranur Junction is the largest railway station in Kerala and it handle trains to almost all parts of the country. The most popular daily express in Kerala the Venad Express runs between Shoranur and Trivandrum.

== Educational institutions ==
- Institute Of Printing Technology & Government Polytechnic College, Shoranur
- Institute for Communicative and Cognitive Neurosciences, Kavalapara, Shoranur
- Vishnu Ayurveda College, Kulapully, Shoranur
- MPMMSN Trust College, Shoranur
- Carmel CMI School, Shoranur
- Al Ameen Engineering College
- Jyoti engineering college, Cheruthuruthy
- National Research Institute for Panchakarma, Cheruthuruthy

== Notable people ==
- Balan K. Nair, actor
- Meghanathan, actor
- A. K. Lohithadas, film director

== Villages ==
- Mavundirikadavu

== Culture and literature ==
=== Literature and history ===
In December 2024, poet and teacher V. M. Girija published Chiramannur to Shoranur: Oru Deshavazhiyude Katha (Malayalam: ചിറമണ്ണൂർ ടു ഷൊർണൂരോരു ദേശവഴിയുടെ കഥ, “From Chiramannur to Shoranur: The Story of a Land Route”). The work, brought out by Manorama Books, examines the cultural history of Shoranur by tracing the transformation of its former name, Chiramannur, into the present town. Blending historical research with personal reflection, the book explores the region's heritage, social memory, and cultural landscape across time. It was launched at the Hortus Cultural Festival, inaugurated by writer Sara Joseph.

== See also ==
- Shoranur Junction
- Walluvanad Taluk
- Palakkad district
- Pattambi
