= Ongallur-I =

- Census Town
- Interactive map of Ongallur-I
- Country: India
- State: Kerala
- District: Palakkad

Government
  - Type: Panchayat raj
  - Body: Ongallur Grama Panchayat

Area
  - Total: 15.31 km^{2} (5.91 sq mi)

Population (2011)
  - Total: 16,998
  - Density: 1,110/km^{2} (2,876/sq mi)

Languages
  - Official: Malayalam, English
- Time zone: UTC+5:30 (IST)
- PIN: 6XXXXX
- Vehicle registration: KL-52

Ongallur-I is a census town in the Palakkad district, state of Kerala, India. It forms a part of Ongallur gram panchayat.

== Demographics ==
As of 2011 Indian census, Ongallur-I had 16,998 people with 8,310 males and 8,688 females.
