= Thirumittacode-II =

- village
- Interactive map of Thirumittacode-II
- Country: India
- State: Kerala
- District: Palakkad

Population (2011)
  - Total: 12,855

Languages
  - Official: Malayalam, English
- Time zone: UTC+5:30 (IST)
- PIN: 6XXXXX
- Vehicle registration: KL-52

Thirumittacode-II is a village in the Palakkad district, state of Kerala, India. Together with Thirumittacode-I, it is administered by the Thirumittacode gram panchayat.

== Demographics ==
As of 2011 India census, Thirumittacode-II had a population of 12,855 with 6,000 males and 6,855 females.
