= Muthuthala =

Muthuthala മുതുതല Muduthala
- village
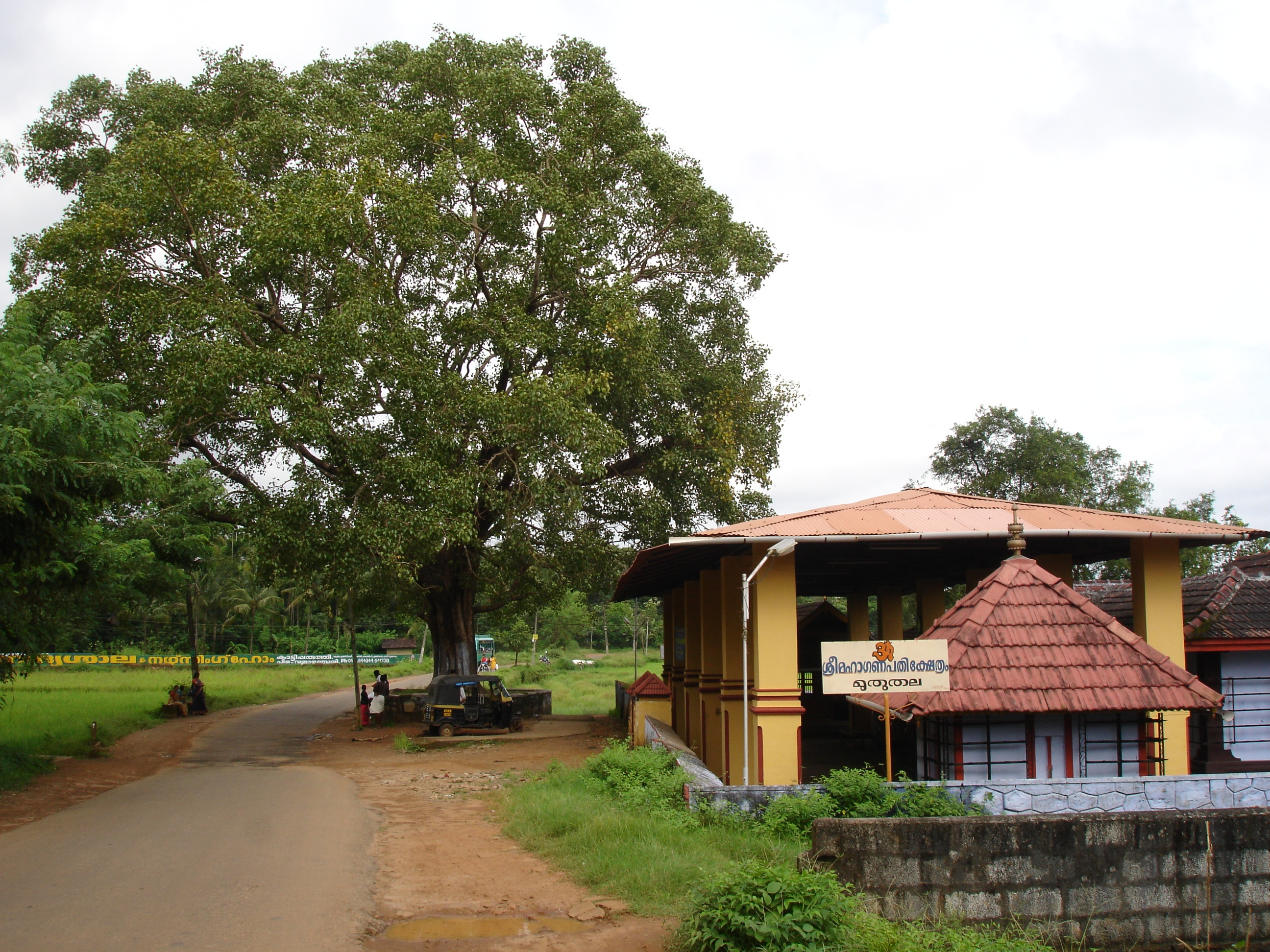
- Muthuthala Sree Maha Ganapathy Temple (2007)
- Interactive map of Muthuthala
- Coordinates: 10.78°N 76.17°E
- Country: India
- State: Kerala
- District: Palakkad

Government
  - Body: Muthuthala Panchayat

Population
  - Total: 21,496

Languages
  - Official: Malayalam, English
- Time zone: UTC+5:30 (IST)
- PIN: 679303
- Telephone code: 091-466
- Vehicle registration: KL-52
- Nearest city: Pattambi
- Lok Sabha constituency: Palakkad
- Civic agency: Muthuthala Panchayat
- Climate: Humid (Köppen)

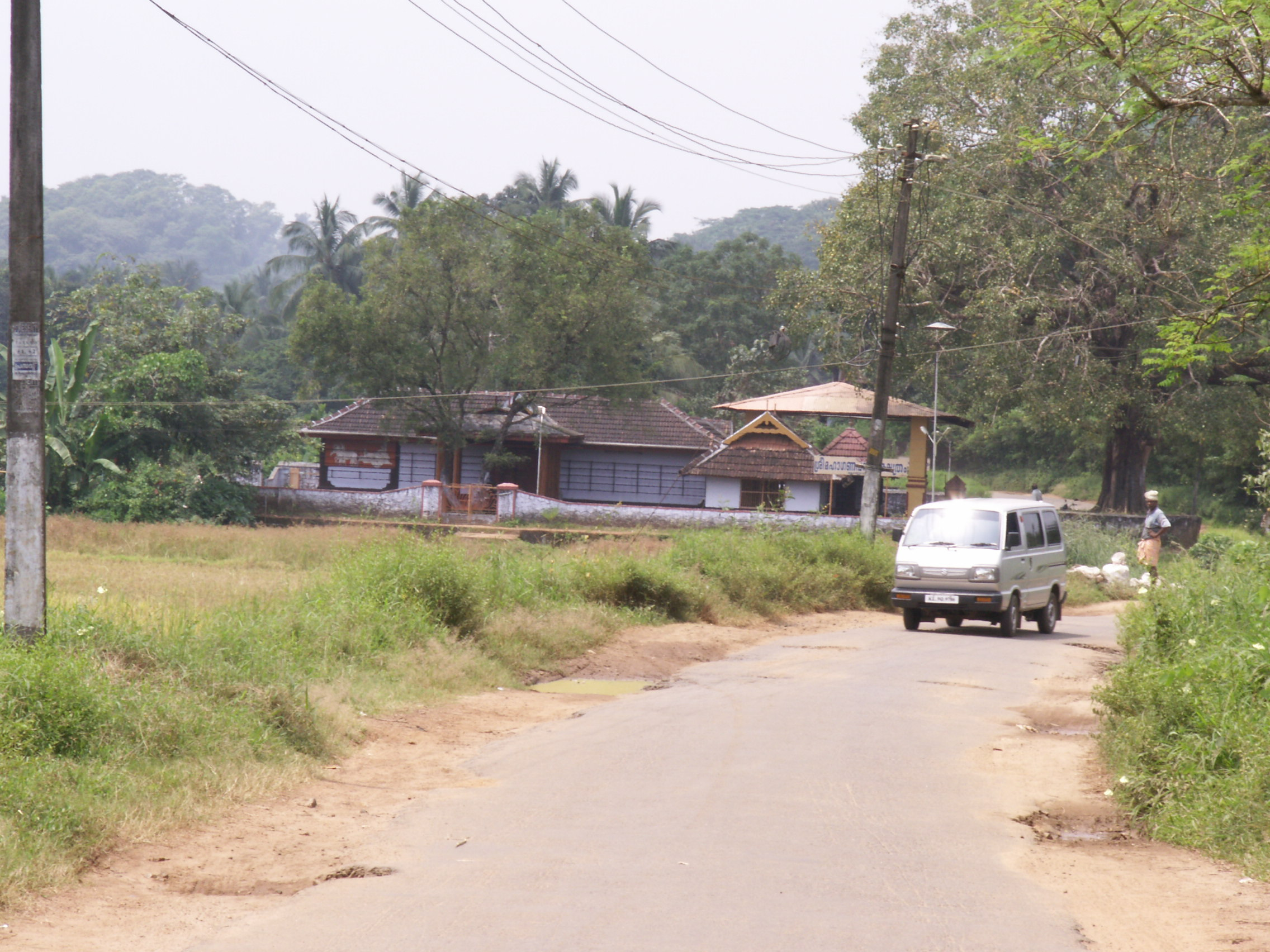
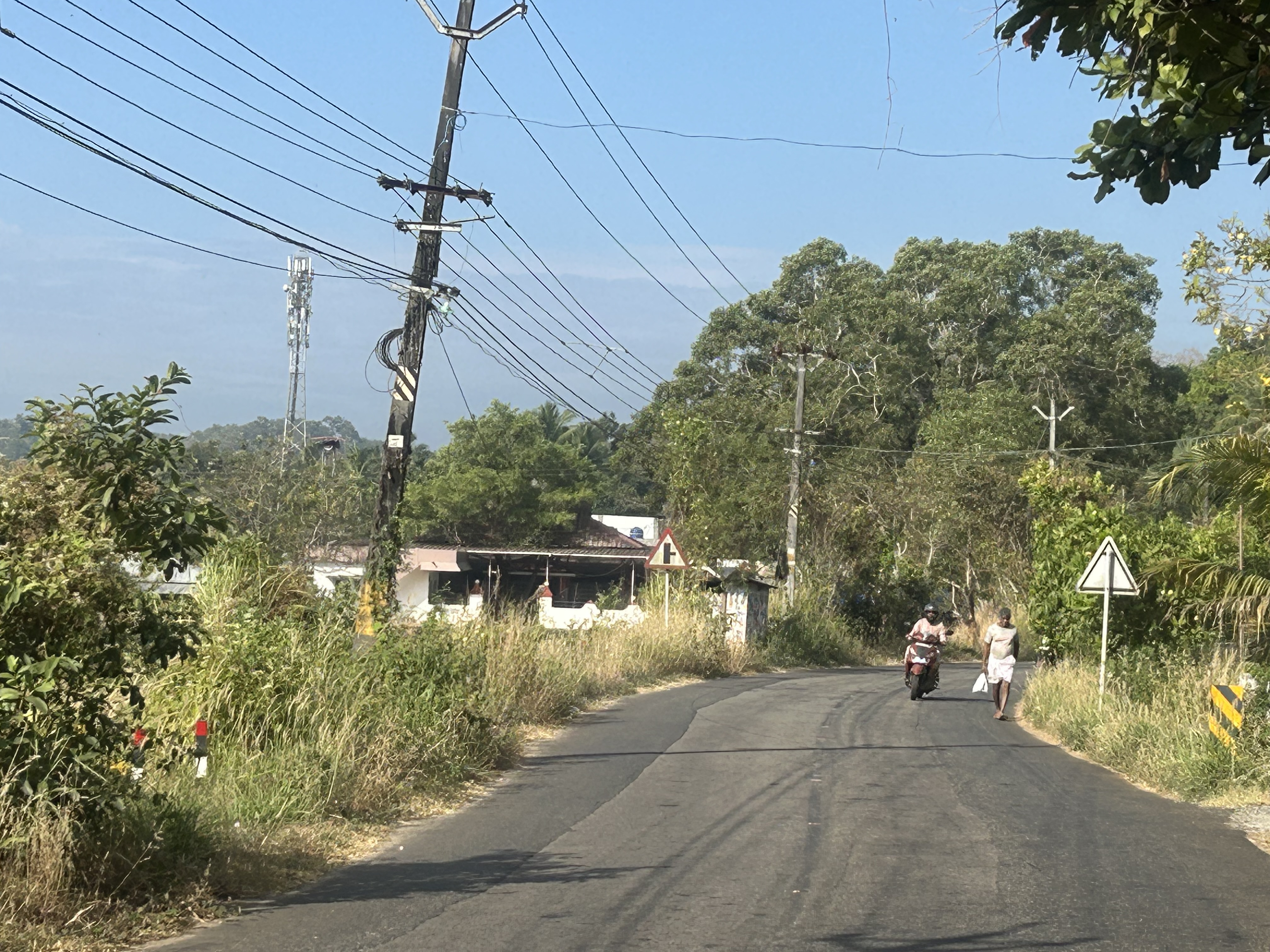

Muthuthala is a village and gram panchayat. It lies northwest of Pattambi in Palakkad district, of the state of Kerala, India. It is located on the banks of the Bharathapuzha River.

The infrastructure of the panchayath is divided into Kodumunda and Muthuthala. Muthuthala, Kodumunda and Karakkuth are important centres. The adjacent villages to Muthuthala are Pallippuram, Koppam and Pattambi.

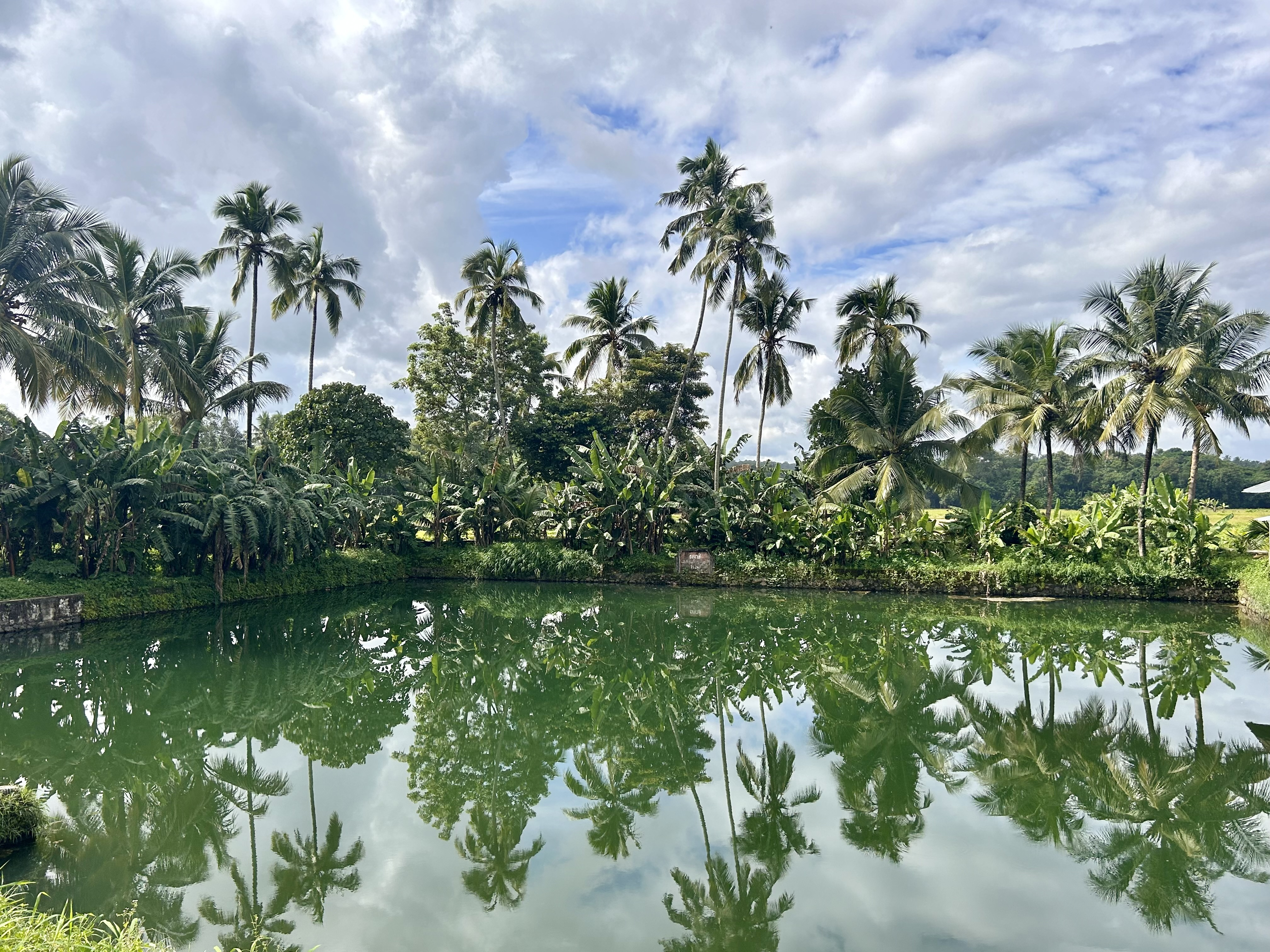
A photo of the Muthuthala Temple Pond on August 19th 2024

== Attractions ==
=== Muthuthala Temple ===
Muthuthala's notable attraction is the Muthuthala Maha Ganapathi Kshetram, or temple, enshrined with the idol of Maha Ganapathi as the principal deity. The other deities are Bhagavathy and Swami Ayyappan. . Many devotees from different parts of Kerala visit here to offer "Ottappam" or "Otta" offering a delicious sweet appam to the deity. This temple is also known for "Mangalya Puja" (special worship for removing any obstacles to the culmination of marriage). This ancient temple was renovated around the mid-2000s. "Thalappoli" (a festival for the Kodikkunnu Bhagavathy presiding over here as well) is the main festival here in the Malayalam month of Makaram (February). There is a beautiful pond near the temple. The “Ambala Kulam (അമ്ബല കുളം)" (meaning Temple Pond in Malayalam) is blessed by the beauty of nature. A renovation of the pond was done in 2004. It is said that the pond contains 7 wells. Some of these wells have been damaged over the years.

There are other temples such as Sree Muthassiyar Kavu, Ayyapan Kavu, Perumudiyoor Shiva Temple, Kozhikotiri Temple etc.

=== Muhyideen Juma Masjid ===
The main Islamic place of worship in Muthuthala is the Muhyideen Juma Masjid at Muthuthala Centre.

Andhattukunnu

A part of the Vadakkumury Hills, Andhattukunnu is located towards the back of Muthuthala, that has a waterfall (only comes in the rainy season (September–October)) and a quarry. The quarry is now filled with water.

== History ==
There had been a trade link passing through the River Bharathapuzha. Varantankuttikkatavu (വരണ്ടകുട്ടിക്കടവ്) was a ferry point which was connecting Thrithala, the local market place and Kodumunda, one of the marketplaces near Muthuthala. Now there is no water transportation available and the site of Varantankuttikadavu is now a field near the Kodumunda Railway Gate. This may be due to the coming of new roads like the Velliyamkallu Dam built in 2007, that connected the two villages. Small boats and rafts were once a major scene of this area as late as the 2000s.

The once open temple (as seen in the 1984 photo) was renovated sometime in between 1992 and 2003.

One of the major Nair houses (Tharavads) that settled there is the erstwhile "Thekkinkoottu", comprising Menon families such as Adat, Kizhakkele, Panampatta, Thottupurath etc.

== Demographics ==
As of 2001 India census, Muthuthala had a population of 21,496 with 10,297 males and 11,199 females.

== Transportation ==
=== Road ===
The village, located 8 km from Pattambi on the Pattambi-Pallippuram Road, can be reached by road and rail. The road from Pattambi forks in two directions at the Muthuthala junction. One road goes to Pallippuram and the other reaches the state highway to Perinthalmanna at Trithala Koppam junction. A diversion from Parakkad, a local village connects Perinthalmanna- Pattambi state highway at Sankaramangalam.

=== Rail ===
Kodumunda is the only railway station in Muthuthala, which is en route to Kozhikode on the Shoranur–Kozhikode railway line. But in 2021, Kodumunda station was abandoned, and no trains halt here. Now, the preferable means to reach Muthuthala is by road. Pattambi is the main railway station nearby where most of the trains do have a stopping.

== Photos ==
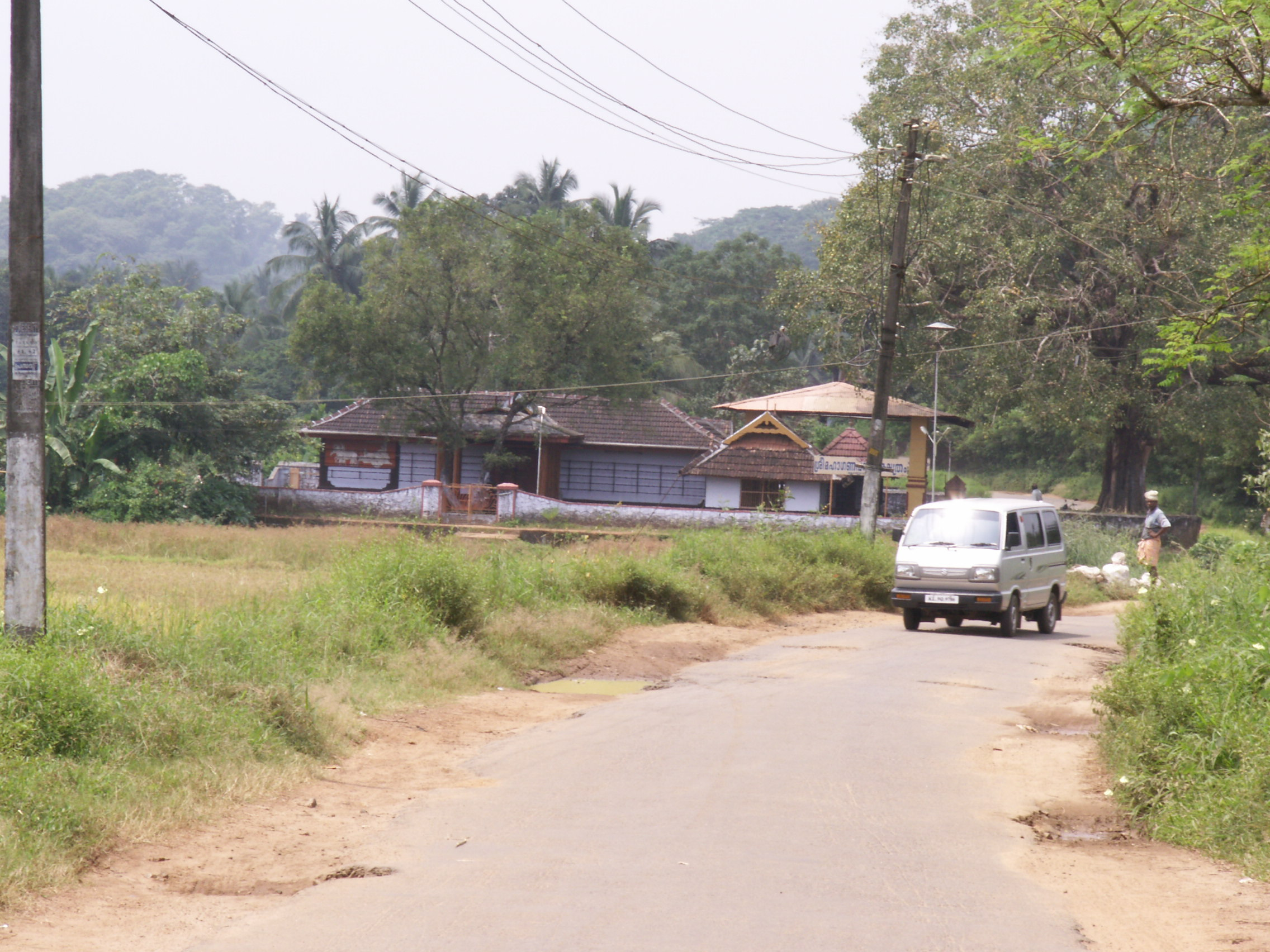
Muthuthala Sree Maha Ganapathy Temple (2007)

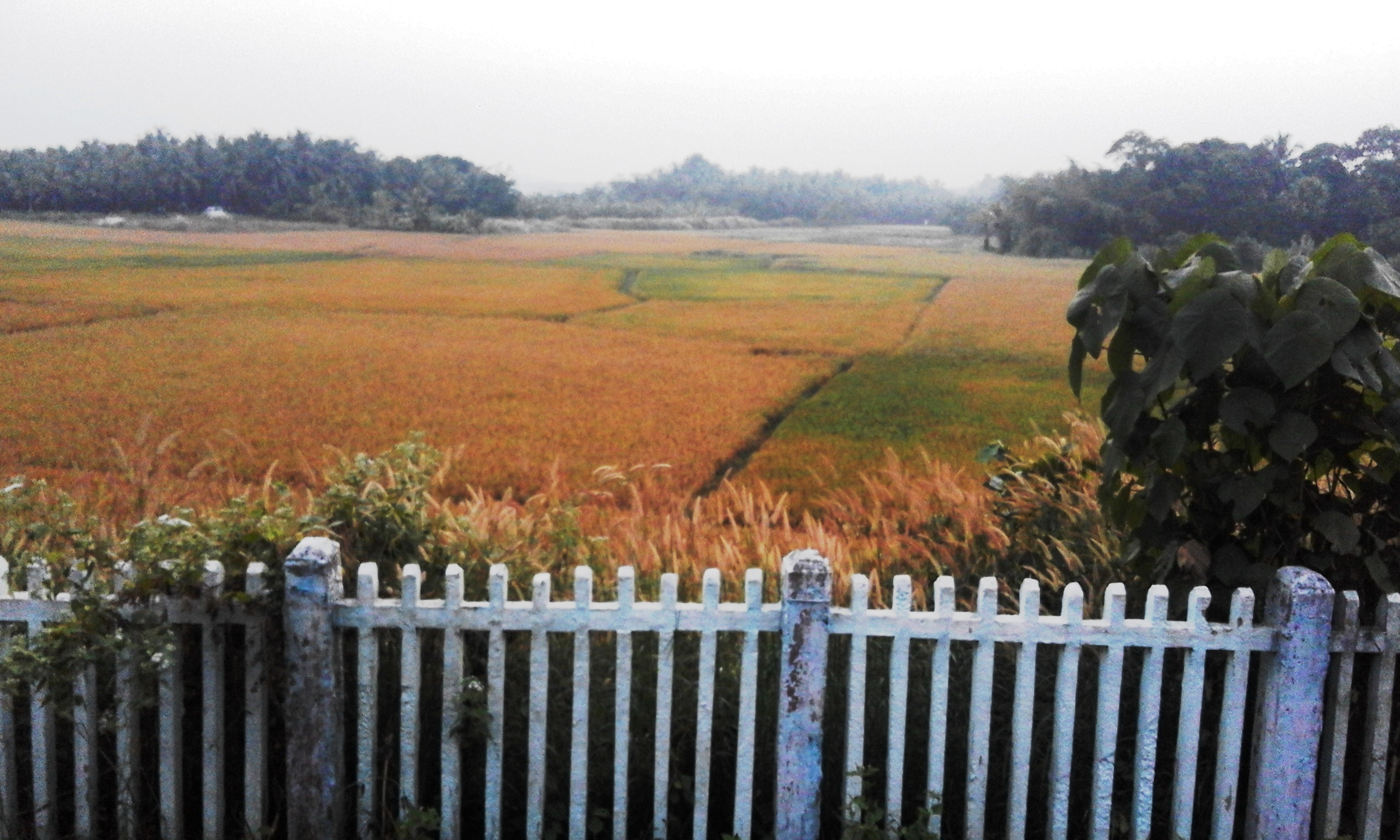
Kodumunda is the only railway station in Muthuthala.

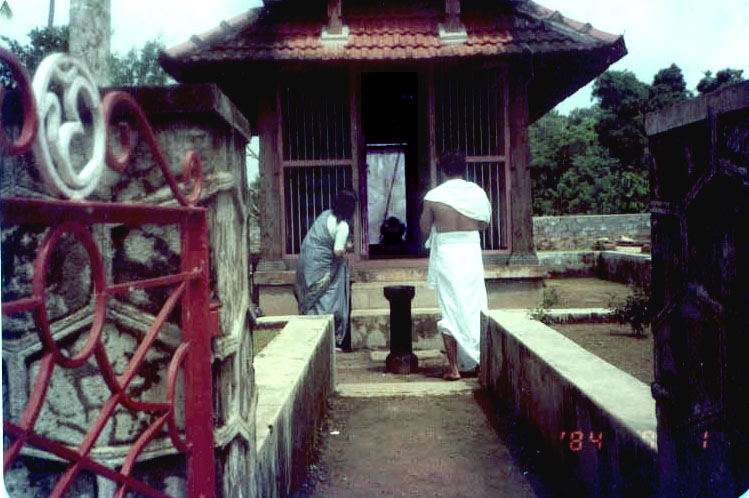
Muthuthala Sree Maha Ganapathy Temple (1984)
