= Ongallur Gram Panchayat =

Town in Kerala, India

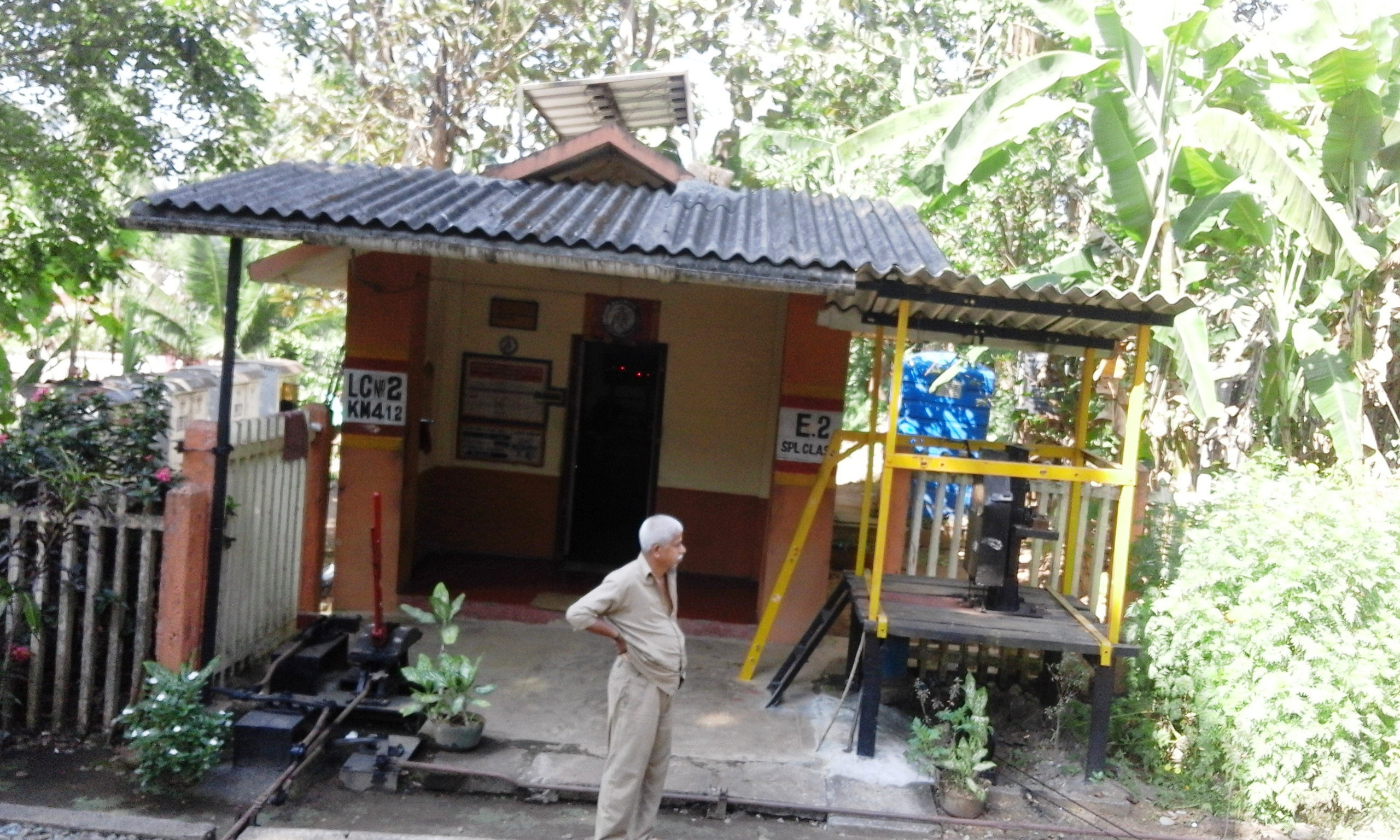
Vadanamkurishy Railway Gate

Ongallur is a small town, gram panchayat in the Palakkad district, state of Kerala, India. It is a local government organisation serving the villages of Ongallur-I and Ongallur-II Ongallur Gramapanchayath have 2 village one is Vadanamkurussi P.O and two is Maruthur P.O Vadanamkurussi Pin code is 679121, Maruthur Pincode is 679306.
