= Parudur =

- village
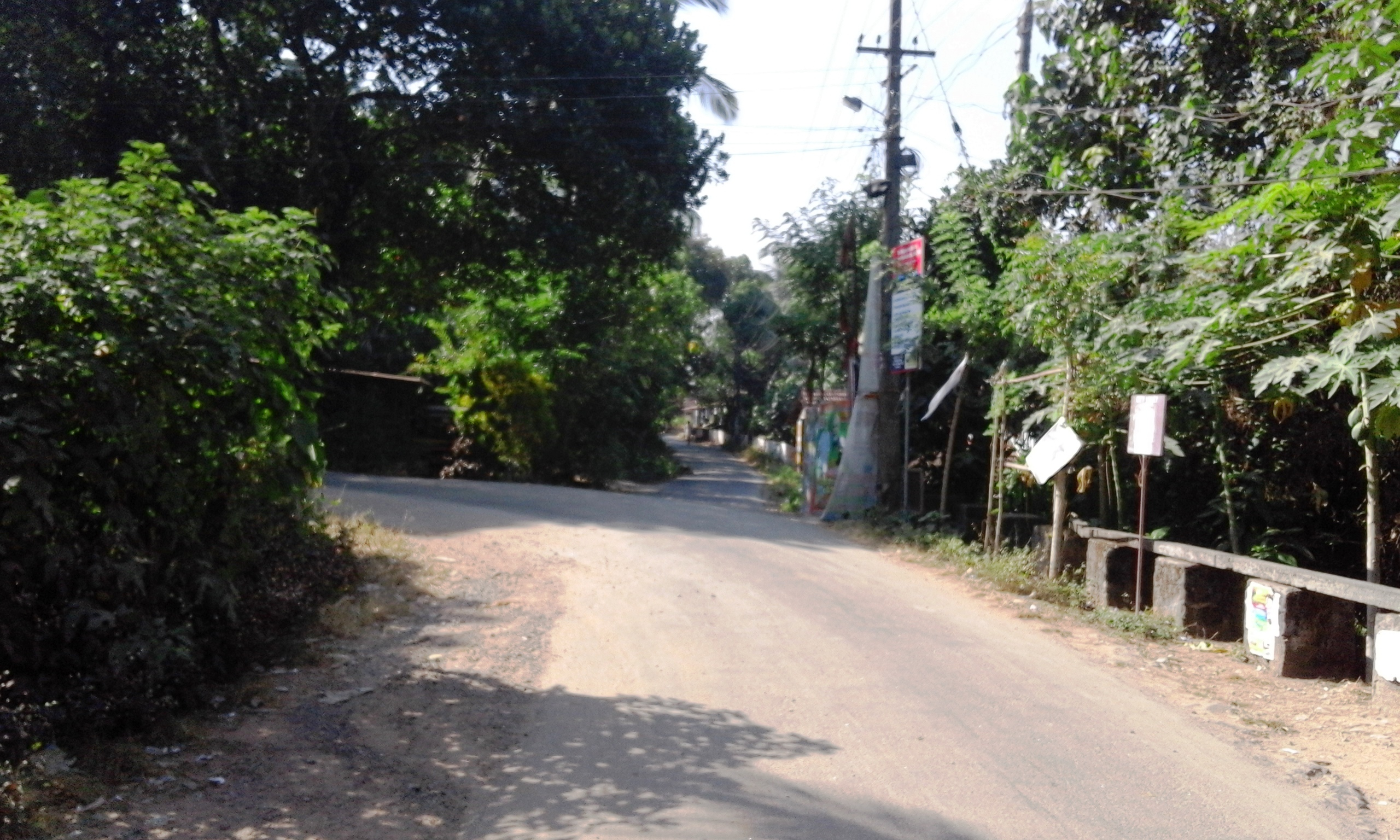
- Parudur, Mukkilappeedika
- Interactive map of Parudur
- Coordinates: 10.817370°N 76.1177500°E
- India: India
- State: Kerala
- District: Palakkad

Population (2011)
  - Total: 26,638

Languages
  - Official: Malayalam, English
- Time zone: UTC+5:30 (IST)
- PIN: 679305
- Vehicle registration: KL-52

Parudur is a village and gram panchayat in Pattambi taluk, Palakkad district in the state of Kerala, India. Parudur was originally a part of Pattambi Block Punjayath in Pattambi Taluk of erstwhile Palakkad district, before the formation of Malappuram district. After the formation of Malappuram district, Tirur Taluk became a part of Malappuram and Parudur village was transferred to Ottapalam Taluk. Today it forms part of Pattambi taluk.

== Demographics ==
As of 2011 India census, Parudur had a population of 26,638 with 12,597 males and 14,041 females.
