= Ongallur-II =

- Census Town
- Interactive map of Ongallur-II
- Country: India
- State: Kerala
- District: Palakkad

Government
  - Type: Panchayat raj
  - Body: Ongallur Grama Panchayat

Area
  - Total: 16.37 km^{2} (6.32 sq mi)

Population (2011)
  - Total: 26,273
  - Density: 1,605/km^{2} (4,157/sq mi)

Languages
  - Official: Malayalam, English
- Time zone: UTC+5:30 (IST)
- PIN: 6XXXXX
- Vehicle registration: KL-52

Ongallur-II is a census town in the Palakkad district, state of Kerala, India. It forms a part of Ongallur gram panchayat. According to Census 2011 Ongallur II has a population of 26,273 of which 12,924 are males while 13,349 are females.

== Demographics ==
Ongallur -II Census Town has population of 26,273 of which 12,924 are males while 13,349 are females as per report released by Census India 2011.
