= Thirumittacode-I =

- Village
- Country: India
- State: Kerala
- District: Palakkad

Population (2011)
  - Total: 19,124

Languages
  - Official: Malayalam, English
- Time zone: UTC+5:30 (IST)
- PIN: 6XXXXX
- Vehicle registration: KL-52 KL-48
- Nearest city: Thrissur (29 km)

Thirumittacode-I is a village in the Palakkad district, state of Kerala, India. Together with Thirumittacode-II, it is administered by the Thirumittacode gram panchayat near Cheruthuruthi-Perumbilavu Road.

== Demographics ==
As of 2011 India census, Thirumittacode-I had a population of 19,124 with 9,102 males and 10,041 females.
