= Pattithara =

- village
- Location in Kerala, India Pattithara (India)
- Coordinates: 10.8118600°N 76.0915200°E
- Country: India
- State: Kerala
- District: Palakkad

Government
  - Type: Local Self Govt
  - Body: Pattithara Grama panchayath

Area
  - Total: 27.2 km^{2} (10.5 sq mi)

Population (2011)
  - Total: 33,157
  - Density: 1,220/km^{2} (3,160/sq mi)

Languages
  - Official: Malayalam, English
- Time zone: UTC+5:30 (IST)
- PIN: 679534
- Vehicle registration: KL-09, KL-52

Pattithara is a village in Palakkad district in the state of Kerala, India.

== Demographics ==
As of 2011 India census, Pattithara had a population of 33157 with 15657 males and 17500 females.

The original name of the place was Bhattithara, which then shrunk to become Pattithara. The origin lies in the Bhattiyil Shiva Temple in the village.

== Suburbs and Villages ==
- Chittappuram, Malamakkavu Road and Kudallur
- Manniyam Perumbalam and Panniyoor

Kishor

== Important Landmarks ==
- kundukadu juma masjidh
- UNITED KUNDUKADU, kundukadu green city
- Bhattiyil Shiva Temple
- Kudallur Juma Masjidh
- Bahathul Islam Madrassah, Kudallur
- Manniyam Perumbalam Juma Masjidh
- Sree Chammundeswari Temple, Aloor
- Kodalil Palakkal Siva Temple, Aloor
- Karanapra Durga Temple, Aloor
- Pooleri GarudaroodaTemple, Aloor
- Pallikulangara Ayappa Temple, Aloor
- Areympadam Bhagavathi Temple, Pattithara
- Navayuga pattithara
- millumpadi pattithara
- Amigoz pattithara
- Sulthanpadi pattithara
- Gramadeepam patttithara
- Brothers library pattithara

Notable Persons

- Abhinand V Nair
