= Pattambi =

- Municipality
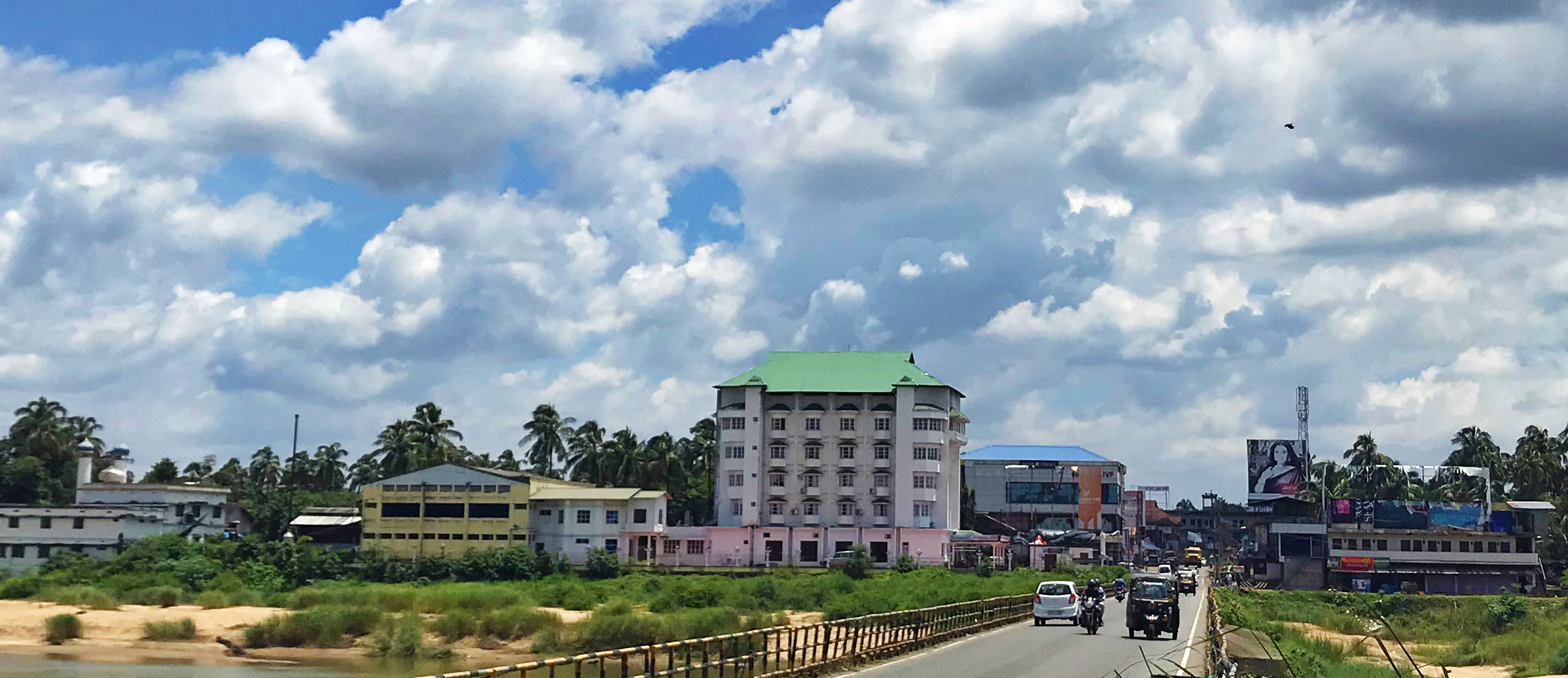
- Pattambi Bridge (built 1966)

- Location in Kerala, India Pattambi (India)
- Coordinates: 10.8057°N 76.1957°E
- Country: India
- State: Kerala
- District: Palakkad District
- Established: 2015 January 14

Government
  - Type: Municipal Council
  - Body: Pattambi Municipality
  - Municipal Chairperson: T P Shaji (INC)
  - Vice Chairperson: Asna Haneefa (IUML)

Area
  - Total: 15.84 km^{2} (6.12 sq mi)
- Elevation: 63 m (207 ft)

Population (2011)
  - Total: 28,632
  - Density: 1,808/km^{2} (4,682/sq mi)

Languages
  - Official: Malayalam
- Time zone: UTC+5:30 (IST)
- PIN: 679 303
- Telephone code: 91466
- Vehicle registration: KL-52
- Sex ratio: 0.96 ♂/♀
- Literacy: 83%
- Parliament constituency: Palakkad
- Assembly constituency: Pattambi
- Website: pattambimunicipality.lsgkerala.gov.in/en

Pattambi is a town, tehsil, and municipality in the Palakkad District of Kerala, India. It is also the administrative headquarters of the Pattambi Taluk.

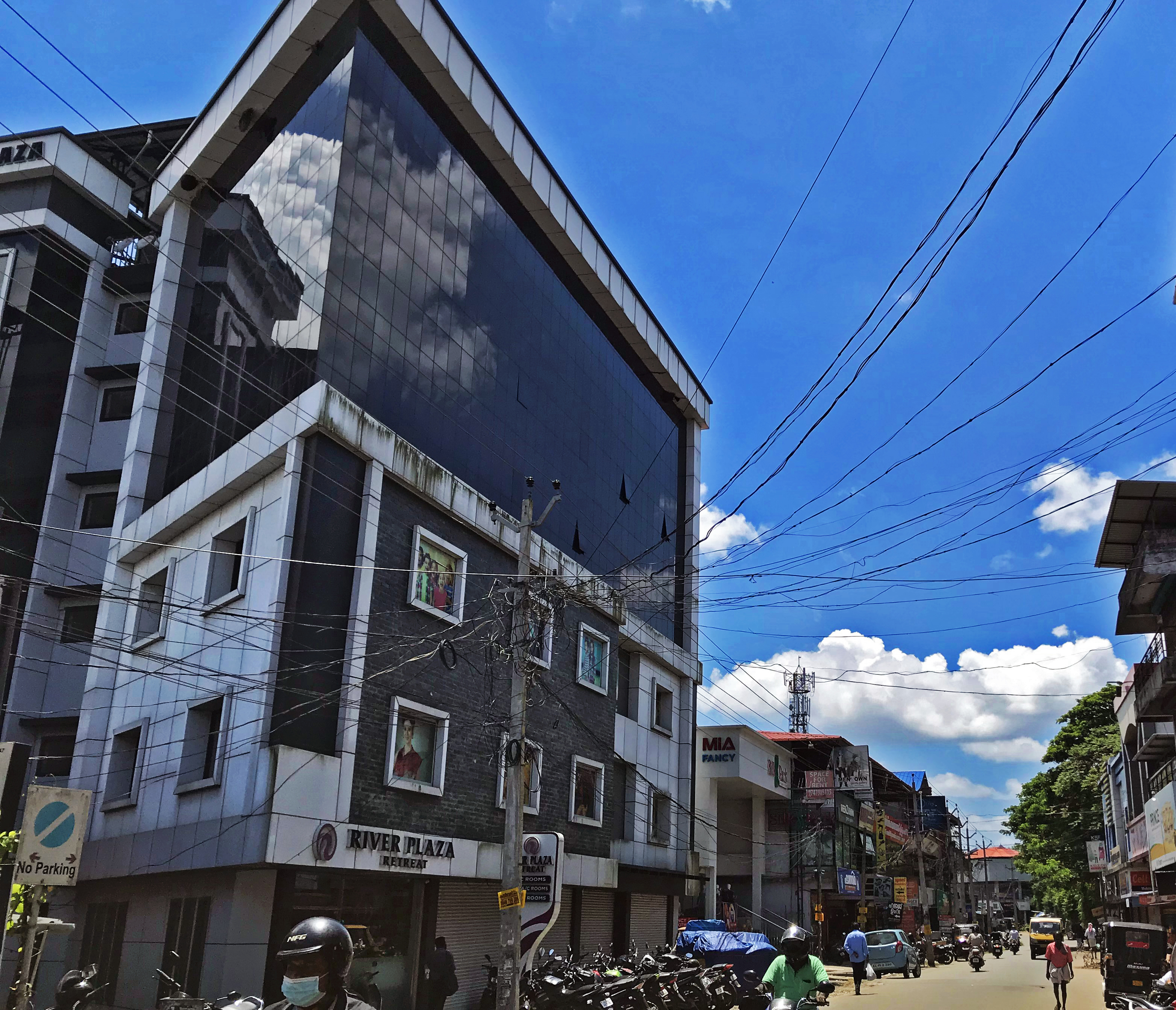
Pallipuram - Pattambi Rd

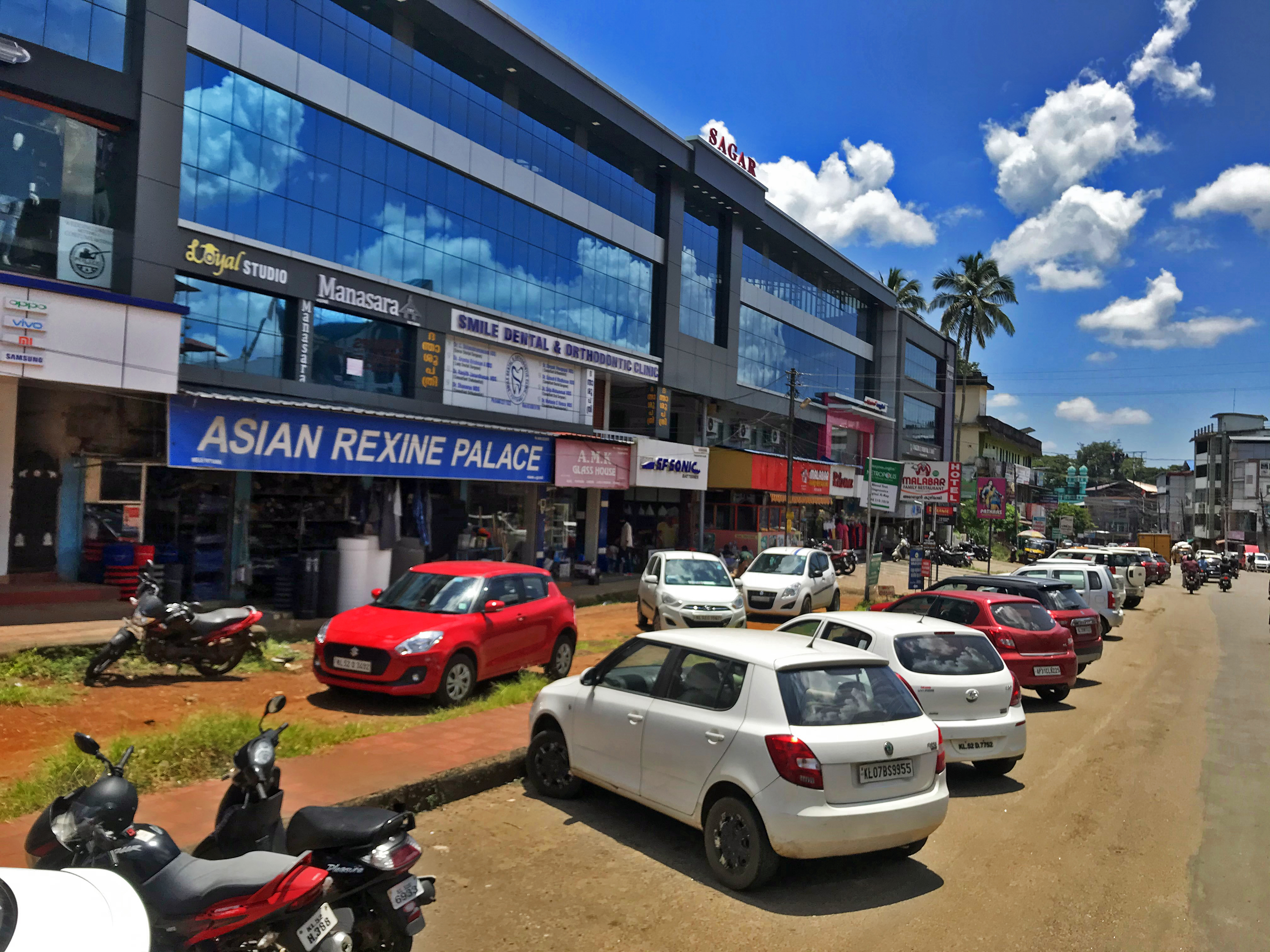
Mele Pattambi

== History ==
Pattambi was originally a part of the Nedunganad Swaroopam dynasty, which was ruled by Nedungadis, who held sway over a large part of present-day Pattambi and Ottapalam tehsils. By the end of the 15th century CE, Nedunganad came under the leadership of the Zamorin of Calicut, who was also the main ruler of the South Malabar region. The Zamorin appointed his local chieftain at Kavalappara Kovilakam to rule this area. It was a part of the Walluvanad taluk in the Malappuram Revenue Division of the Malabar District during the British Raj, and later became part of the Ottapalam taluk. The Pattambi Bridge, that connects the town to Nhangattiri, was built in 1966 and was sanctioned to be replaced in 2011 due to ageing. Now, Pattambi is the headquarters of Pattambi Taluk, formed on 23 December 2013.

== Culture ==
The Pattambi region has historical associations with Kerala’s traditional Ayurveda heritage, including nearby Ashtavaidya families such as the Pulamanthole Mooss lineage associated with Pulamanthole.

== Demographics ==

Religion in Pattambi (2011)
1. Islam (55.3%)
2. Hinduism (43.7%)
3. Christianity (0.86%)
4. Other (0.07%)

In the 2011 census of India, the total population of Pattambi Village Panchayat was recorded to be 28,632.

- 14,049 males (49%); 14,583 females (51%).
- Number of households: 5,897
- Scheduled Caste population: 3,471 (12%)
- Scheduled Tribe population: 37 (less than 1% ).
- In the age group 0–6 years: 3,534 (males: 1,837, females: 1,697)
- Literacy: 83% (23,888 literates and 4,744 illiterates)
- 8,561 individuals were employed. It includes 1,657 people with irregular employment.

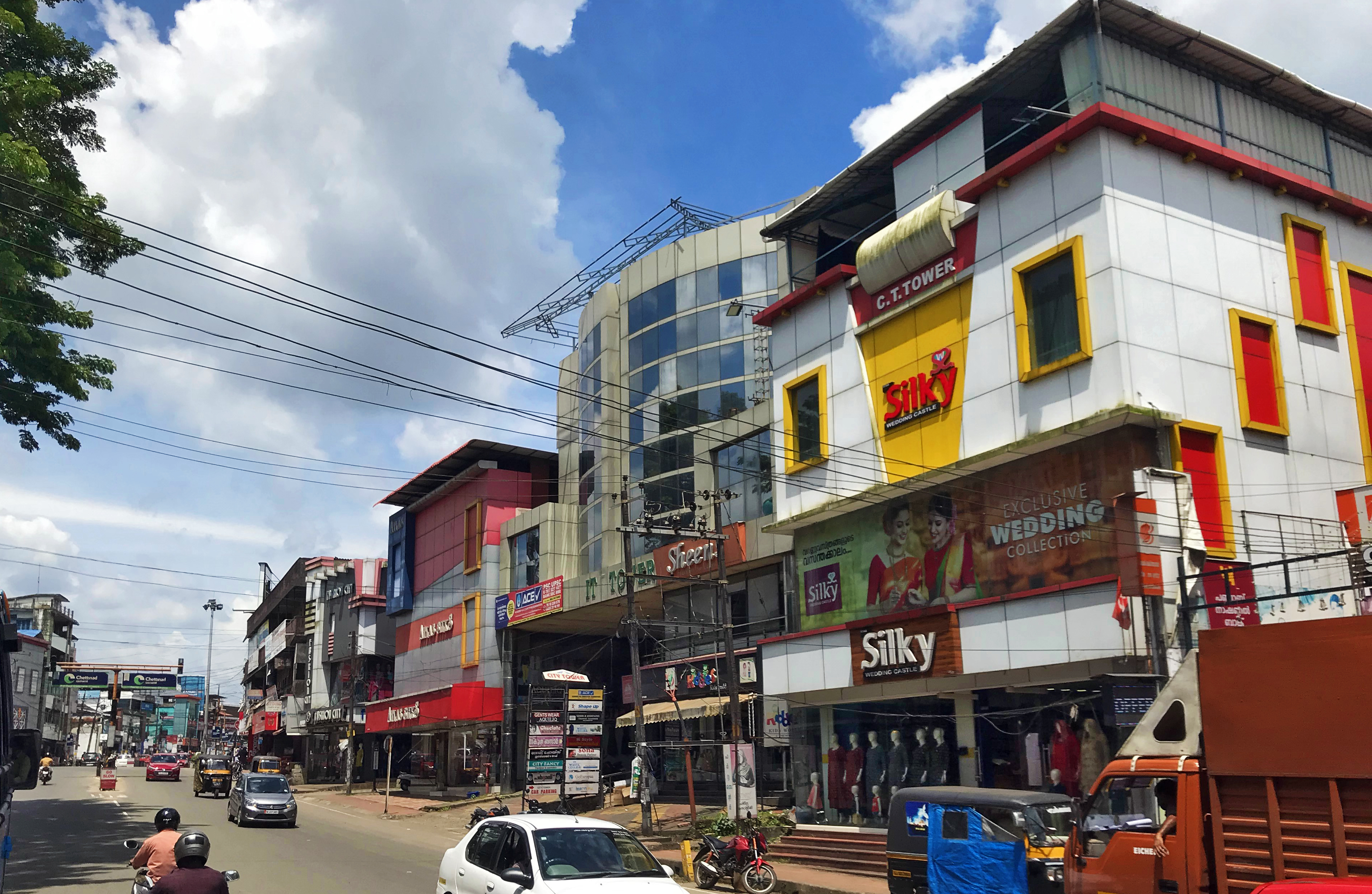
Pattambi town

== Notable people ==
- Akkitham Achuthan Namboothiri
- Anoop Krishnan
- Anumol
- C. P. Mohammed
- E. P. Gopalan
- E. Sreedharan
- Govind Padmasoorya
- Kalamandalam Gopi
- M. T. Vasudevan Nair
- M. G. Sasi
- Major Ravi
- Manikandan Pattambi
- Muhammed Muhsin
- P. Raman
- Shafi Parambil
- Shivaji
- V. T. Balram
- V. T. Bhattathiripad

== See also ==
- Pattambi Taluk
- Sree Neelakanta Government Sanskrit College Pattambi
- Regional Agricultural Research Station, Pattambi
- Pattambi Assembly constituency
- Shoranur–Mangalore section
- Pulamantol
- Ashtavaidya tradition
