= Irinjalakuda Assembly constituency =

Constituency of the Kerala legislative assembly in India

Irinjalakuda
- Constituency No. 70 for the Kerala Legislative Assembly
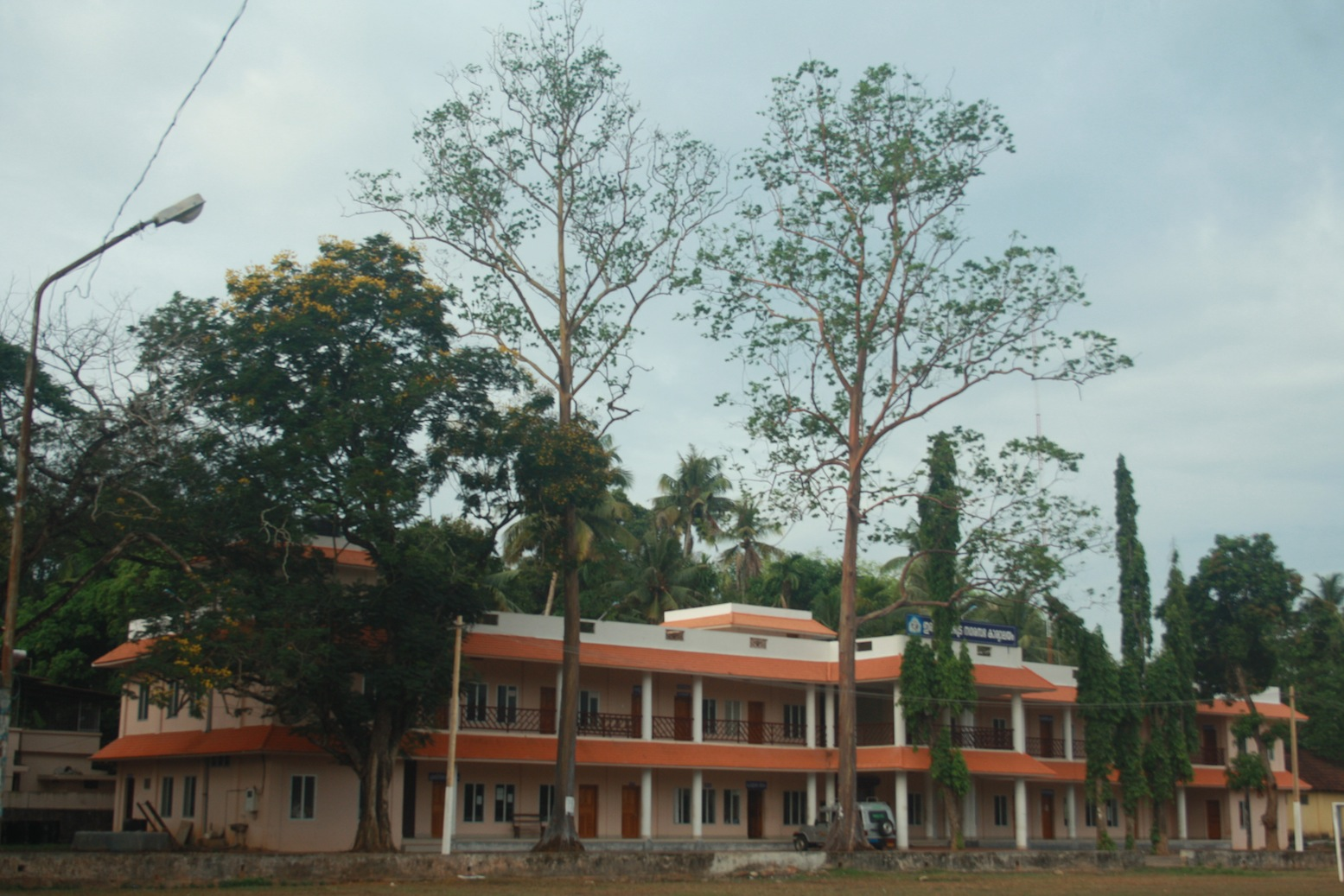
- Irinjalakuda Municipal Office in Irinjalakuda Assembly constituency

Constituency details
- Country: India
- Region: South India
- State: Kerala
- District: Thrissur
- Established: 1957
- Total electors: 1,91,930 (2021)
- Reservation: None

Member of Legislative Assembly
- 16th Kerala Legislative Assembly
- Incumbent Thomas Unniyadan
- Party: Kerala Congress
- Elected year: 2026

Irinjalakuda State assembly constituency is one of the 140 state legislative assembly constituencies in Kerala. It is also one of the seven state legislative assembly constituencies included in Thrissur Lok Sabha constituency. As of the 2026 assembly elections, the current MLA is Thomas Unniyadan of Kerala Congress.

== Local self-governed segments ==
Irinjalakuda Assembly constituency is composed of the following local self-governed segments:

Sl no.	Name	Status (Grama panchayat/Municipality)	Taluk
1	Irinjalakuda	Municipality	Mukundapuram
2	Karalam	Grama panchayat	Mukundapuram
3	Kattoor	Grama panchayat	Mukundapuram
4	Muriyad	Grama panchayat	Mukundapuram
5	Padiyur	Grama panchayat	Mukundapuram
6	Poomangalam	Grama panchayat	Mukundapuram
7	Vellookkara	Grama panchayat	Mukundapuram
8	Aloor	Grama panchayat	Chalakudy

Local bodies of Irinjalakuda Assembly constituency

== Members of Legislative Assembly ==
The following list contains all members of Kerala Legislative Assembly who have represented the constituency:

Election	Niyama Sabha	Member	Party	Tenure
1957	1st	C. Achutha Menon	Communist Party of India	1957 – 1960
1960	2nd	C. Achutha Menon	Communist Party of India	1960 – 1965
1967	3rd	C. K. Rajan	Communist Party of India	1967 – 1970
1970	4th	C. S. Gangadharan	Kerala Socialist Party	1970 – 1977
1977	5th	Siddarthan Kattungal	Indian National Congress	1977 – 1980
1980	6th	Jose Thanickal	Indian National Congress	1980 – 1982
1982	7th	Lonappan Nambadan	Independent	1982 – 1987
1987	8th	Lonappan Nambadan	Independent	1987 – 1991
1991	9th	Lonappan Nambadan	Independent	1991 – 1996
1996	10th	Lonappan Nambadan	Independent	1996 – 2001
2001	11th	Thomas Unniyadan	Kerala Congress	2001 – 2006
2006	12th	Thomas Unniyadan	Kerala Congress	2006 – 2011
2011	13th	Thomas Unniyadan	Kerala Congress	2011 – 2016
2016	14th	K. U. Arunan	Communist Party of India	2016 – 2021
2021	15th	R. Bindu	Communist Party of India	2021 - 2026
2026	16th	Thomas Unniyadan	Kerala Congress	2026 - present

== Election results ==
=== 2026 ===
2026 Kerala Legislative Assembly election: Irinjalakuda
Party	Candidate	Votes	%	±%
KEC	Thomas Unniyadan	66,282	43.54	▲7.10
CPI(M)	R. Bindu	56,070	36.83	▼3.44
BJP	Santhosh Cherakulam	27,167	17.84	▼4.28
BSP	Thankamany Tharayil	921	0.60	
AAP	Dr. Shaju Kavungal	579	0.38	
Independent	Dr. Anish	259	0.17	
Independent	Ayyappan Manakkal	100	0.07	
NOTA	None of the above	863	0.57	▲0.19
Margin of victory		10,212	6.71	
Turnout		1,52,241		
KEC gain from CPI(M)		Swing	▲7.10	

=== 2021 ===
There were 1,91,930 registered voters in the constituency for the 2021 election.

2021 Kerala Legislative Assembly election: Irinjalakuda
Party	Candidate	Votes	%	±%
CPI(M)	R. Bindu	62,493	40.27	▲0.27
KEC	Thomas Unniyadan	56,544	36.44	▼1.74
BJP	Jacob Thomas	33,685	22.12	▲1.75
NOTA	None of the above	583	0.38	▼0.19
CPI(M) hold		Swing		
Turnout		1,55,179		

=== 2016 ===
There were 1,91,930 registered voters in the constituency for the 2016 election.

2016 Kerala Legislative Assembly election: Irinjalakuda
Party	Candidate	Votes	%	±%
CPI(M)	K. U. Arunan	59,730	40.00	▼2.33
KC(M)	Thomas Unniyadan	57,019	38.18	▼13.52
BJP	Santhosh Cherakulam	30,420	20.37	▲15.33
NOTA	None of the above	857	0.57	−
BSP	V. C. Unnikrishnan	639	0.43	▲0.09
Independent	Davis Chatheli	345	0.23	−
CPI(M)	Ayyapan Manaykal	314	0.21	
Margin of victory		2,711	1.82	
CPI(M) gain from KC(M)		Swing	{{{swing}}}	
Turnout		1,49,324	77.80	▲1.81

=== 2011 ===
There were 1,74,214 registered voters in the constituency for the 2011 election.

2011 Kerala Legislative Assembly election: Irinjalakuda
Party	Candidate	Votes	%	±%
KC(M)	Thomas Unniyadan	68,445	51.70	
CPI(M)	K. R. Vijaya	56,041	42.33	
BJP	K. C. Venu	6,669	5.04	
Independent	T. V. Sivadasan	772	0.58	
BSP	Subramanian	449	0.34	
Margin of victory		12,404	9.37	
KC(M) hold		Swing		
Turnout		1,32,379	75.99	
