= 1977 Kerala Legislative Assembly election =

- 19 March 1977

All 140 seats in the Kerala Legislative Assembly 71 seats needed for a majority
- Turnout: 79.19% (▲3.9%)
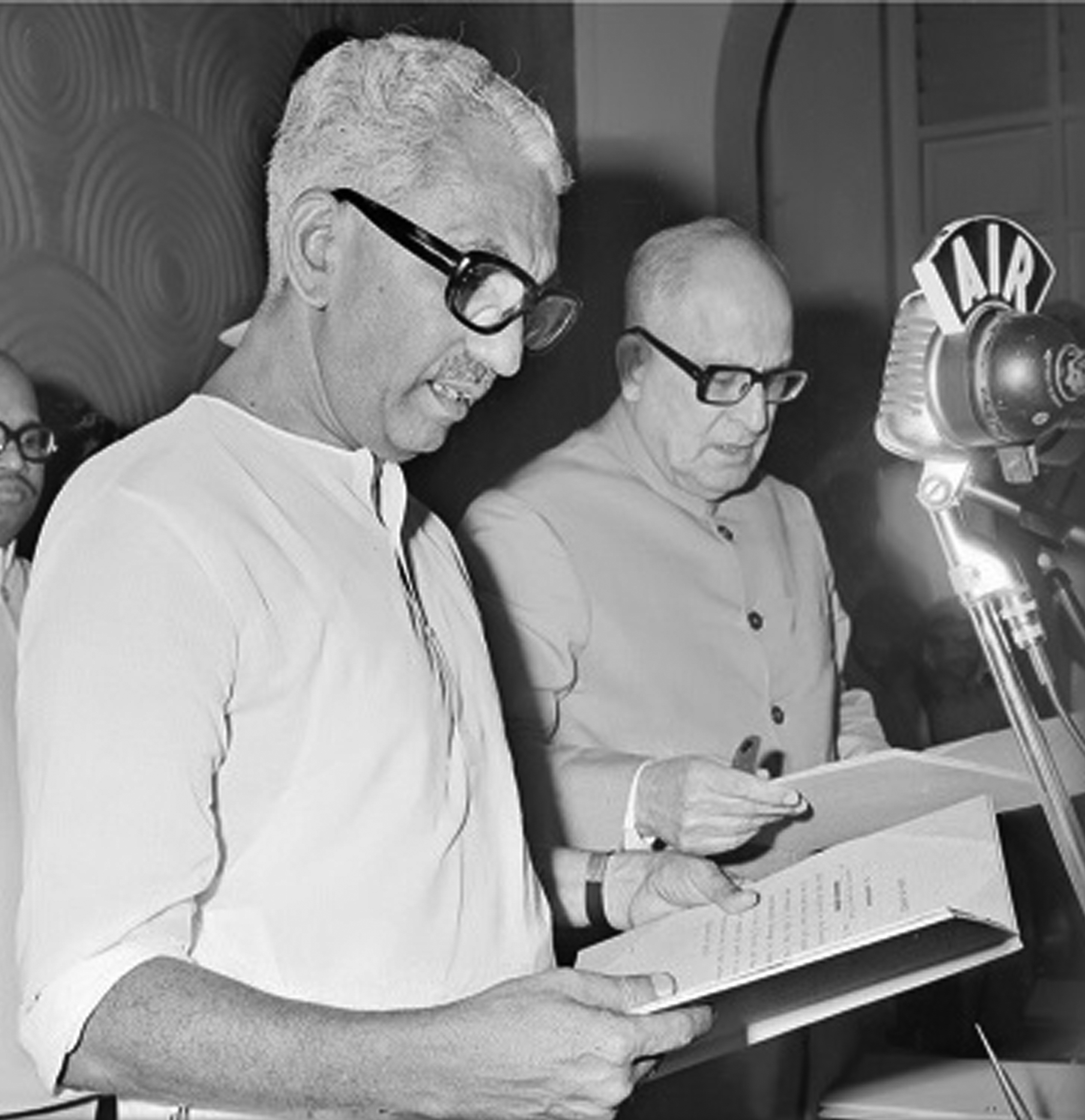

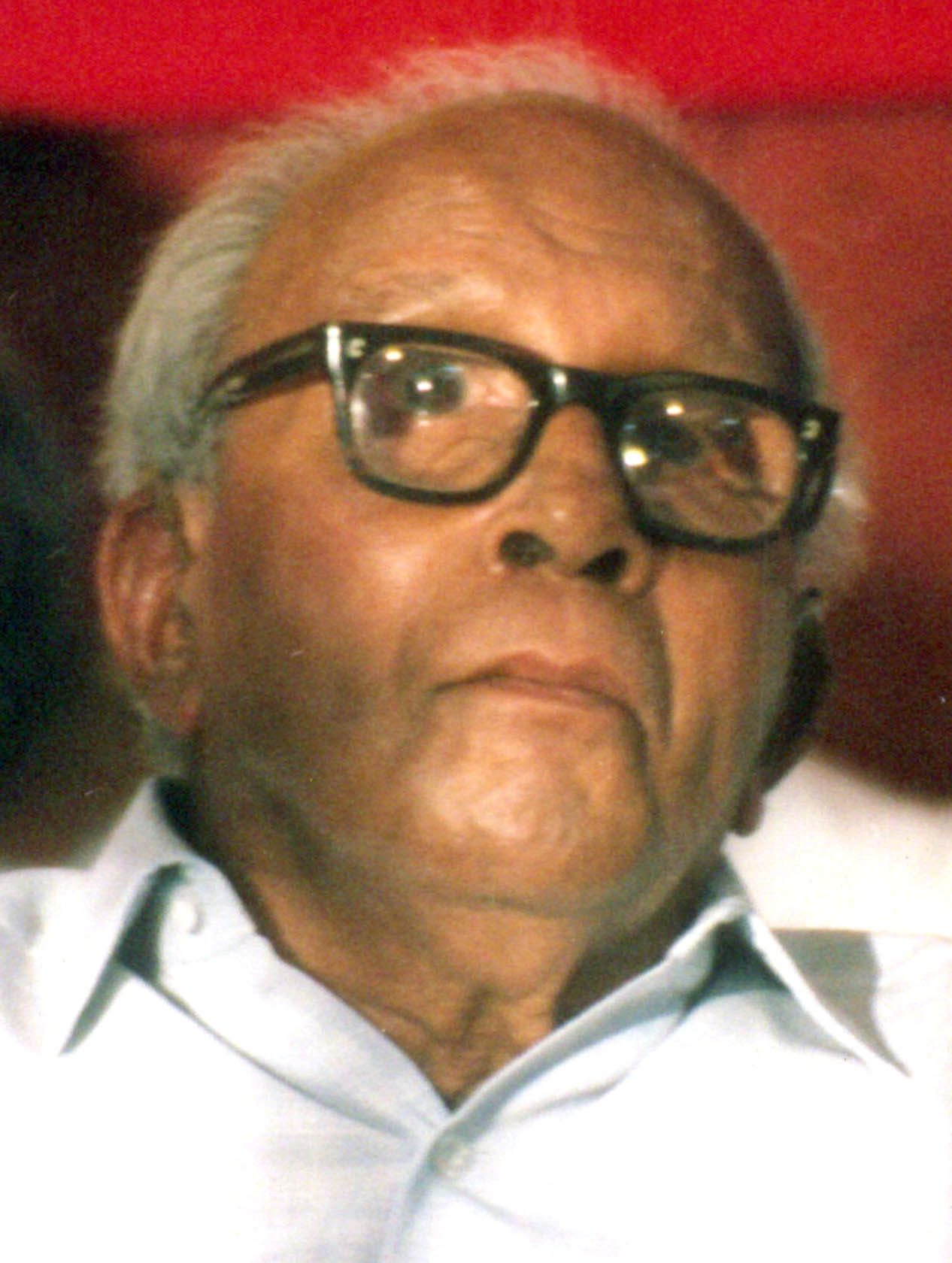
	First party	Second party
Leader	K. Karunakaran	E. M. S. Namboodiripad
Party	INC	CPI(M)
Alliance	United Front	Left Front
Leader's seat	Mala	Alathur
Last election	30	29
Seats won	38	17
Seat change	▲8	▼12
- Kerala, India; Kerala, one of the states in South India, has an electorate of more than 21 million people.

- Alliance wise structure
Chief Minister before election
C. Achutha Menon
CPI
Elected Chief Minister
K. Karunakaran
INC

Elections were held on 19 March 1977 to elect members to the fifth Niyamasabha. The United Front, led by INC and CPI won plurality of seats and remained in power, with K. Karunakaran as the Chief Minister.

== History ==
Fourth Kerala Legislative Assembly, which was elected in 1970, completed its term by 1975, but it was extended on three occasions during the Emergency. Election of 1977 was the general election after the withdrawal of Emergency imposed on 26 June 1975.

This is the first election the 1974 delimitation of Assembly Constituencies was put to effect, which increased number of seat in the assembly from 133 to 140

== Results ==
=== Party Wise Results ===
Party Wise Results
Alliance	Party	Seats
United Front	Indian National Congress (INC)	38
United Front	Communist Party of India (CPI)	23
United Front	Kerala Congress (KEC)	20
United Front	Indian Union Muslim League (IUML)	13
United Front	Revolutionary Socialist Party (RSP)	9
United Front	National Democratic Party (NDP) (Note: The members of the PSP and NDP were elected as independent candidates.)	5
United Front	Praja Socialist Party (PSP)	3
Opposition	Communist Party of India (Marxist) (CPI(M))	17
Opposition	Bharatiya Lok Dal (BLD)	6
Opposition	All India Muslim League (Opposition) (AIML)	3
Opposition	Kerala Congress (Pillai Group) (KCP)	2
Opposition	Independent (IND)	1
Total	140	

=== Constituency Wise Results ===
Detailed constituency-wise Results
Sl No.	Constituency Name	Category	Winner Candidates Name	Gender	Party	Vote	Runner-up Candidates Name	Gender	Party	vote
1	Manjeshwar	GEN	M. Ramappa	M	CPI	25709	H. Shankara Alva	M	BLD	21100
2	Kasaragod	GEN	T. A. Ibrahim	M	MUL	29402	B. M. Abdul Rehiman	M	MLO	22619
3	Udma	GEN	N. K. Balakrishnan	M	United Front IND	31690	K. G. Marar	M	BLD	28145
4	Hosdrug	(SC)	K. T. Kumaran	M	CPI	34683	M. Raghavan	M	CPM	32578
5	Trikaripur	GEN	P. Karunakaran	M	CPM	38632	P. T. Jose	M	KEC	32512
6	Irikkur	GEN	C. P. Govindan Nambiar	M	INC	34889	Sabastian Vettam	M	KCP	27741
7	Payyannur	GEN	N. Subramoniya Shenoy	M	CPM	37256	T. C. Bharathan	M	IND	32209
8	Taliparamba	GEN	M. V. Raghavan	M	CPM	36829	K. Narayanan Nambiar	M	IND	35304
9	Azhikode	GEN	Chatayan Govindan	M	CPM	32548	C. C. Abdul Halim	M	MUL	26712
10	Kannur	GEN	P. Bhaskaran	M	BLD	31391	N. K. Kumaran	M	INC	30701
11	Edakkad	GEN	P. P. V. Moosa	M	MLO	34266	N. Ramakrishnan	M	INC	30947
12	Thalassery	GEN	Pattiam Gopalan	M	CPM	38419	N. C. Mammootty	M	CPI	29946
13	Peringalam	GEN	P. R. Karup	M	INC	33916	V. K. Achuthan	M	BLD	31958
14	Kuthuparamba	GEN	Pinarayi Vijayan	M	CPM	34465	Abdulkadar	M	RSP	30064
15	Peravoor	GEN	K. P. Noorudeen	M	INC	36449	E. P. Krishnan Nambiar	M	CPM	31465
16	North Wynad	(ST)	M. V. Rajan	M	INC	32589	A. Gopalan	M	CPM	24288
17	Vatakara	GEN	K. Chandrasekharan	M	BLD	37543	P. Vijayan	M	INC	34998
18	Nadapuram	GEN	Kandalottu Kunhambu	M	CPI	37391	E. V. Kumaran	M	CPM	30321
19	Meppayur	GEN	Panarath Kunhimohammed	M	MUL	40642	A. V. Abdurahiman Haji	M	MLO	34808
20	Quilandy	GEN	E. Narayanan Nair	M	INC	39581	E. Rajagopalan Nair	M	BLD	35074
21	Perambra	GEN	K. C. Joseph	M	KEC	35694	V. V. Dakshinamoorthy	M	CPM	34921
22	Balusseri	GEN	P. K. Sankarankutty	M	BLD	33960	Puthoor Ramakrishnan Nair	M	INC	32413
23	Koduvally	GEN	E. Ahammad	M	MUL	39241	K. Moosakutty	M	CPM	31206
24	Calicut- I	GEN	N. Chandrasekhara Kurup	M	CPM	37249	P. V. Sankaranarayanan	M	INC	35476
25	Calicut- II	GEN	P. M. Aboobacker	M	MLO	33531	S. V. Usmankoya	M	MUL	32433
26	Beypore	GEN	N. P. Moideen	M	INC	35374	K. Chathunni Master	M	CPM	33178
27	Kunnamangalam	(SC)	K. P. Raman	M	MLO	30289	P. K. Kannan	M	CPI	28601
28	Thiruvambady	GEN	P. Cyriac John	M	INC	29835	E. T. Mohammed Basheer	M	MLO	26454
29	Kalpetta	GEN	K. G. Adiyodi	M	INC	28713	M. P. Veerandrakumar	M	BLD	26608
30	Sultan's Battery	(ST)	K. Raghavan Master	M	INC	29204	Nidyachery Vasu	M	BLD	24213
31	Wandoor	(SC)	V. Eacharan	M	INC	35369	K. Gopalan	M	BLD	22079
32	Nilambur	GEN	Aryadan Muhammed	M	INC	35410	K. Saidali Kutty	M	CPM	27695
33	Manjeri	GEN	M. P. M Abdulla Kurikkal	M	MUL	43626	K. A. Quader	M	MLO	16807
34	Malappuram	GEN	C. H. Mohammed Koya	M	MUL	39362	T. K. S. A. Muthukoyathangal	M	MLO	15724
35	Kondotty	GEN	P. Seethi Haji	M	MUL	41731	M. C. Muhammed	M	MLO	20159
36	Tirurangadi	GEN	Avakader Kutty Naha	M	MUL	40540	T. P. Kunhalan Kutty	M	IND	21479
37	Tanur	GEN	U. A. Beeran	M	MUL	42886	C. M. Kutty	M	MLO	12158
38	Tirur	GEN	P. T. Kunhimuhammed ( Kunhukutty Hajee )	M	MUL	41675	K. Moideen Kutty Haji ( K. Bava Haji )	M	MLO	26127
39	Ponnani	GEN	M. P. Gangadharan	M	INC	38083	E. K. Imbichi Bava	M	CPM	28334
40	Kuttippuram	GEN	Chakeri Ahmedkutty	M	MUL	36367	K. Moidu	M	MLO	12023
41	Mankada	GEN	Korambayil Ahammed Haji	M	MUL	33597	Cherukoya Thangal	M	MLO	26207
42	Perinthalmanna	GEN	K. K. S. Thangal	M	MUL	32356	Paloli Muhammed Kutty	M	CPM	24751
43	Thrithala	GEN	K. Sankaranarayanan	M	INC	34012	P. P. Krishnan	M	CPM	24288
44	Pattambi	GEN	E. P. Gopalan	M	CPI	30659	Devaki Warrier	F	CPM	26072
45	Ottapalam	GEN	P. Balan	M	INC	30937	K. P. Unni	M	CPM	24120
46	Sreekrishnapuram	GEN	K. Sukumaranunni	M	INC	32071	C. Govinda Panicker	M	CPM	28136
47	Mannarkkad	GEN	A. N. Yusuff	M	CPI	30563	C. S. Gangadharan	M	CPM	23854
48	Malampuzha	GEN	P. V. Kunhikannan	M	CPM	27122	C. M. Chandrasekharan	M	RSP	22696
49	Palghat	GEN	C. M. Sundaram	M	United Front IND	30160	R. Krishnan	M	CPM	27357
50	Chittur	GEN	P. Sankar	M	CPI	28698	K. A. Sivarama Bharathy	M	BLD	21121
51	Kollengode	GEN	C. Vasudeva Menon	M	CPM	29303	K. V. Narayanan	M	CPI	28865
52	Coyalmannam	(SC)	M. K. Krishnan	M	CPM	34798	N. Subbayyan	M	INC	29570
53	Alathur	GEN	E. M. S. Namboodiripad	M	CPM	31424	V. S. Vijayaraghavan	M	INC	29425
54	Chelakara	(SC)	K. K. Balakrishnan	M	INC	34460	K. S. Sankaran	M	CPM	24525
55	Wadakkanchery	GEN	K. S. Narayanan Namboodiri	M	INC	37783	A. S. N. Nambisan	M	CPM	25725
56	Kunnamkulam	GEN	K. P. Viswanathan	M	INC	35230	T. K. Krishnan	M	CPM	29889
57	Cherpu	GEN	K. P. Prabhakaran	M	CPI	33526	I. M. Velayudhan	M	IND	29007
58	Trichur	GEN	K. J. George	M	BLD	32335	P. A. Antony	M	INC	28185
59	Ollur	GEN	P. R. Francis	M	INC	30931	Adv. P. K. Asokan	M	CPM	29845
60	Kodakara	GEN	Lonappan Nambadan	M	KEC	30569	T. P. Sitaraman	M	BLD	29119
61	Chalakudi	GEN	P. K. Ittoop	M	KCP	33581	P. P. George	M	INC	25968
62	Mala	GEN	K. Karunakaran	M	INC	34699	Paul Kokkat	M	CPM	25233
63	Irinjalakuda	GEN	Sidharthan Kattungal	M	INC	33377	John Manjooran	M	IND	31243
64	Manalur	GEN	N. I. Devassykutty	M	INC	32314	M. G. Jayachandran	M	IND	24986
65	Guruvayoor	GEN	B. V. Seethi Thangal	M	MUL	34063	V. M. Sulaiman	M	MLO	20071
66	Nattika	GEN	P. K. Gopalakrishnan	M	CPI	32917	V. K. Gopinathan	M	BLD	24711
67	Kodungallur	GEN	V. K. Rajan	M	CPI	32159	P. V. Abdul Kader	M	IND	24048
68	Ankamali	GEN	A. P. Kurian	M	CPM	36261	P. P. Thankachan	M	INC	35700
69	Vadakkekara	GEN	T. K. Abdu	M	CPM	30498	K. C. Mathew	M	CPI	29541
70	Parur	GEN	Xavier Arakkal	M	INC	29644	Varkey Painandar	M	IND	24733
71	Narakkal	(SC)	T. A. Paraman	M	RSP	30985	S. Vasu	M	CPM	28795
72	Ernakulam	GEN	A. L. Jacob	M	INC	33367	Alexander Parambithara	M	BLD	31643
73	Mattancherry	GEN	K. J. Harschel	M	BLD	29543	A. A. Kochunny	M	INC	25348
74	Palluruthy	GEN	Eapen Varghese	M	KEC	32479	M. M. Lawrence	M	CPM	30638
75	Thrippunithura	GEN	T. K. Ramakrishnan	M	CPM	35754	K. M. Ramsakunju	M	MUL	30009
76	Alwaye	GEN	T. H. Musthafa	M	INC	37017	M. P. M. Japherkhan	M	MLO	36259
77	Perumbavoor	GEN	P. R. Sivan	M	CPM	34133	P. I. Poulose	M	INC	32386
78	Kunnathunad	GEN	P. R. Esthose	M	CPM	31126	Paul P. Mani	M	INC	28436
79	Piravom	GEN	T. M. Jacob	M	KEC	35598	Alunkal Devassy	M	BLD	29868
80	Muvattupuzha	GEN	P. C. Joseph	M	KEC	32994	Sunny Mannathukaran	M	KCP	28349
81	Kothamangalam	GEN	M. V. Mani	M	KEC	34523	M. E. Kuriakose	M	KCP	31432
82	Thodupuzha	GEN	P. J. Joseph	M	KEC	38294	A. C. Chacko	M	KCP	24386
83	Devicolam	(SC)	Kittappanarayanaswamy	M	INC	27348	G. Varadan	M	CPM	18949
84	Idukki	GEN	V. T. Sebastian	M	KEC	23244	John Thomas Mooleparambil	M	IND	14071
85	Udumbanchola	GEN	Thomas Joseph	M	KEC	29083	M. Ginadevan	M	CPM	20843
86	Peermade	GEN	C. A. Kuriyan	M	CPI	27360	K. S. Krishnan	M	CPM	20013
87	Kanjirappally	GEN	K. V. Kurian	M	KEC	32207	Eapen Jacob	M	KCP	28227
88	Vazhoor	GEN	K. Narayana Kurup	M	KEC	37391	K. M. Sadasivan Nair	M	CPM	17356
89	Changanacherry	GEN	Joseph Chacko	M	KEC	31960	Mathew Mullakupadem	M	KCP	19481
90	Kottayam	GEN	P. P. George	M	CPI	35683	M. Thomas	M	CPM	32107
91	Ettumanoor	GEN	P. B. R. Pillai	M	BLD	23795	M. C. Abraham	M	INC	23553
92	Puthuppally	GEN	Oommen Chandy	M	INC	40376	P. C. Cherian	M	BLD	24466
93	Poonjar	GEN	V. J. Joseph	M	KEC	34770	P. I. Devasia	M	KCP	21065
94	Palai	GEN	K. M. Mani	M	KEC	39664	N. C. Joseph	M	IND	24807
95	Kaduthuruthy	GEN	O. Lukose	M	KEC	38403	K. K. Joseph	M	CPM	25652
96	Vaikom	(SC)	M. K. Kesavan	M	CPI	39711	K. G. Bhaskaran	M	CPM	24770
97	Aroor	GEN	P. S. Sreenivasan	M	CPI	39643	K. R. Gouri	F	CPM	30048
98	Sherthala	GEN	M. K. Raghavan	M	INC	37767	N. P. Thandar	M	CPM	26007
99	Mararikulam	GEN	A. V. Thamarakshan	M	RSP	39094	P. K. Chandrandan	M	CPM	34748
100	Alleppey	GEN	P. K. Vasudevan Nair	M	CPI	35301	Joseph Matahn	M	BLD	25631
101	Ambalapuzha	GEN	K. K. Kumara Pillai	M	RSP	32056	V. S. Achuthanandan	M	CPM	26471
102	Kuttanad	GEN	Eappen Kandakudy	M	KEC	34161	K.P. Joseph	M	CPM	27014
103	Haripad	GEN	G.P. Mangalathu Madaom	M	United Front IND	33037	C.B.C. Warrier	M	CPM	30118
104	Kayamkulam	GEN	Thundathie Kunjukrishna Pillai	M	INC	29742	P.A. Haris P.K. Kunju	M	BLD	24655
105	Thiruvalla	GEN	E. John Jacob	M	KEC	31548	John Jacob Vallakkalil	M	KCP	24573
106	Kallooppara	GEN	T.S. John	M	KEC	33967	E.K. Kuriakose	M	KCP	17173
107	Aranmula	GEN	M.K. Hemachandran	M	INC	35482	P.N. Chandrasenan	M	IND	21127
108	Chengannur	GEN	Thakappan Pillai	M	United Front IND	33909	K.R. Saraswathi Amma	F	KCP	27356
109	Mavelikara	GEN	Bhaskaran Nair	M	United front IND	35103	S. Govinda Kurup	M	CPM	26310
110	Pandalam	(SC)	Damodaran Kalassery	M	INC	36938	V. Kesavan	M	CPM	31764
111	Ranni	GEN	K.A. Mathew	M	KEC	32530	F. Thomas Kuttikayam	M	KCP	23235
112	Pathanamthitta	GEN	George Mathew	M	KEC	34853	K.K. Nair	M	IND	30686
113	Konni	GEN	P.J. Thomas	M	INC	30714	R.C. Unnithan	M	CPM	30277
114	Pathanapuram	GEN	E.K. Pillai	M	CPI	30927	A. George	M	KCP	30136
115	Punalur	GEN	P.K. Sreenjvasan	M	CPI	33870	V. Bharathan	M	CPM	30668
116	Chadayamangalam	GEN	Chandrasekharan Nair	M	CPI	31906	N. Sundaresan	M	CPM	20219
117	Kottarakkara	GEN	R. Balakrishan Pillai	M	KCP	37253	Kottara Gopalkrishan	M	INC	23098
118	Neduvathur	(SC)	Bhargavi Thankappan	F	CPI	33941	Vettikavala Kochukunju	M	BLD	22019
119	Adoor	GEN	Thennala Balakrishna Pillai	M	INC	31214	Mathew Muthalali	M	KCP	23826
120	Kunnathur	(SC)	Kallada Narayanan	M	RSP	43347	C.K. Thankappan	M	CPM	25103
121	Karunagappally	GEN	P. M. Sheriff	M	CPI	29739	C.P. Karunnakaran Pillai	M	CPM	24255
122	Chavara	GEN	Baby John	M	RSP	36892	A. Noorundin Kunju	M	IND	17583
123	Kundara	GEN	A. A. Rahim	M	INC	29758	V. V. Joseph	M	IND	29362
124	Quilon	GEN	Thyagarajan	M	RSP	37065	N. Padmalochanan	M	CPM	24049
125	Eravipuram	GEN	R. S. Unni	M	RSP	39119	R. M. Parameswaran	M	IND	22666
126	Chathanoor	GEN	J. Chitharanjan	M	CPI	38787	Varinja Vasu Pillai	M	BLD	20016
127	Varkala	GEN	T. A. Majeed	M	CPI	25210	Shamsuddin	M	BLD	18991
128	Attingal	GEN	Vakkam Purushothaman	M	INC	32452	Varkala Radhakrishnan	M	CPM	23892
129	Kilimanoor	(SC)	P. K. Chathan Master	M	CPI	32242	C. K. Balakrishnan	M	CPM	31412
130	Vamanapuram	GEN	N. Vasudevan Pillai	M	CPM	31463	M. Kunju Krishnan Pillai	M	INC	29071
131	Ariyanad	GEN	K. C. Vamadevan	M	RSP	26100	Thakidi Krishanan Nair	M	BLD	18908
132	Nedumangad	GEN	Kaniapuram Ramachandran Nair	M	CPI	34731	R. Sundaresan Nair	M	IND	23992
133	Kazhakuttam	GEN	Thlaekunnil Basheer	M	INC	37014	A. Essuddin	M	MLO	22637
134	Trivandrum North	GEN	K. Raveendran Nair	M	United Front IND	31971	S. Dharmarajan	M	CPM	25806
135	Trivandrum West	GEN	K. Pankajakshan	M	RSP	31224	S.M. Noohu	M	BLD	20301
136	Trivandrum East	GEN	P. Narayanan Nair	M	United Front IND	33405	J. Saradamma	F	CPM	22802
137	Nemom	GEN	S. Varadarajan Nair	M	INC	32063	Pallichal Sadasivan	M	CPM	25142
138	Kovalam	GEN	A. Neellalohithadasan Nadar	M	Left IND	32549	N. Sakthan	M	KEC	28435
139	Neyyattinkara	GEN	R. Sundaresan Nair	M	United Front IND	30372	R. Parameswaran	M	CPM	24678
140	Parassala	GEN	M. Kunjukrishnan Nadar	M	INC	34485	M. Sathyanesan	M	CPM	21084

=== By-Elections ===
S.No.	Constituency	Type	Year	Winning candidate	Party	Votes	Runner-up Candidate	Party	Votes	Winning party	Majority
133	Kazhakootam	GEN	1977	A.K. Antony	INC	38463	P. Sreedharan Nair	CPM- Ind.	29794	INC	8669
136	Trivandrum East	GEN	1978	K.Anirudhan	CPM	23891	P.K.Pillai	IND	22106	CPM	1785
2	Kasaragod	GEN	1979	B. M. A. Rahiman	MLO	22419	C. T. A. Ali	MUL	21269	MLO	1150
12	Tellicherry	GEN	1979	M.V.Rajagopalan	CPM	44457	K.Sreedharan	CPI	23799	CPM	20658
105	Thiruvalla	GEN	1979	P.C.T.Painummoottil	JNP	30552	J.J.Vallakkalil	KEC	24863	JNP	5689
140	Parassala	GEN	1979	M.Sahyanesan	CPM	27986	M. S. Nadar	INC(I)	20657	CPM	7329

=== Formation of Ministry ===
On 25 March, K. Karunakaran of Congress sworn as Chief Minister. However, Karunakaran had to resign within a month over the controversial death of Left-leaning engineering student Rajan, who was tortured during the Emergency when he was the Home Minister. Then 15 member ministry under the leadership of A.K. Antony assumed office on 27 April 1977. When Congress split in January 1978, Karunakaran joined the new Indira Congress, and A K Antony continued with the 'main' Congress, which was variously known as Congress (Urs), Congress (Socialist). Antony resigned as Chief Minister in late 1978 when his Congress faction decided to support Indira Gandhi in Chickmagalur bye-election. CPI and Congress also drifted apart. Though the ruling alliance had won nearly 80% seats in the election, it became unstable, and the assembly lasted less than 3 years.

K. Karunakaran's ministry holds the record for ministry which served the shortest term
