= Giriraj Singh Bora =

Indian surgeon

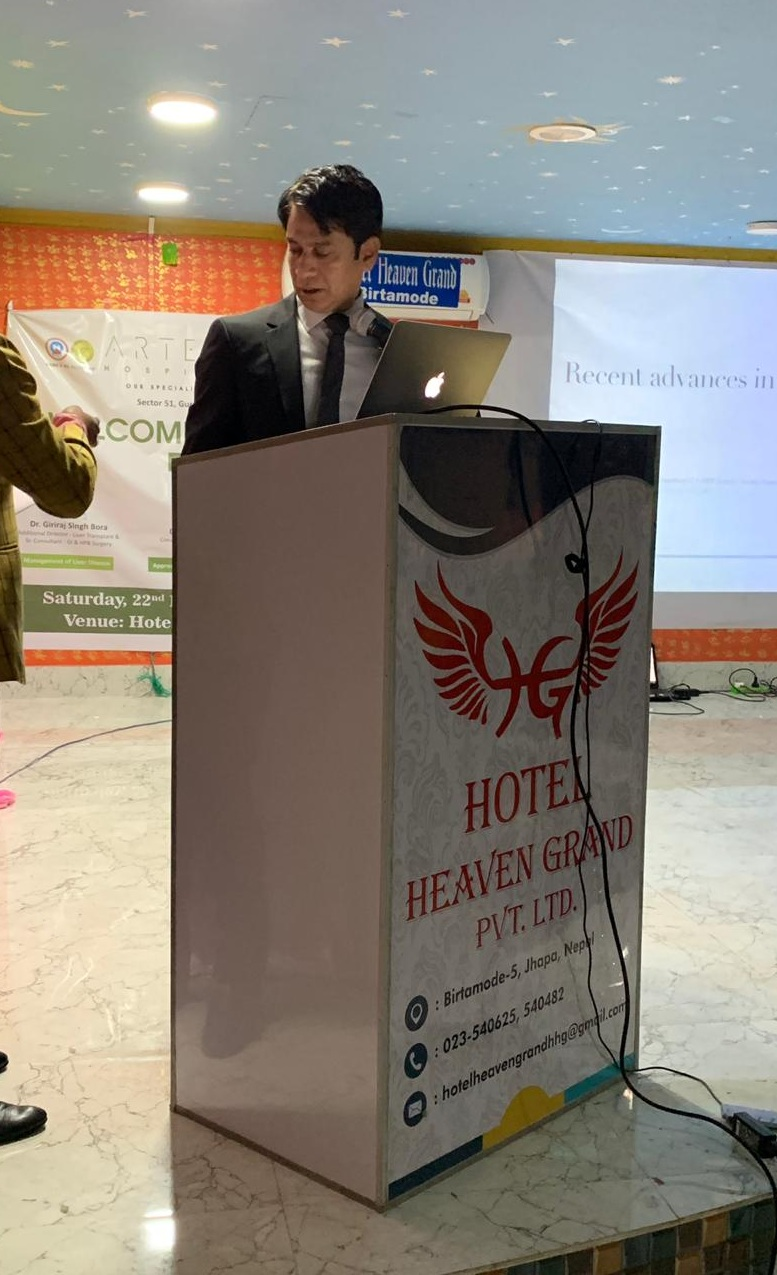
- Born: 1 January 1975 (age 51); Jaipur, Rajasthan
- Citizenship: Indian
- Education: MCh Maulana Azad Medical College
- Occupation: Surgeon
- Known for: liver surgery
- Medical career
- Sub-specialties: Gastro intestinal surgery, Liver transplant
- Website: livertransplantinstitute.com

Giriraj Singh Bora is an Indian liver transplant surgeon. He is the founder member of the Liver Transplant Society of India. Bora was the first surgeon to successfully transplant a liver in Rajasthan. He carried out the first deceased donor and the first living donor liver transplants in Rajasthan and has been instrumental in starting a liver transplant program in the region. He currently serves as the joint director of Liver Transplantation and senior consultant of Gastrointestinal Surgery at Artemis Hospital.

== Early life and education ==
Born in Jaipur, Rajasthan, Bora received his medical degree from JLN Medical College, Ajmer. He received an MS in Surgery from the same college in Rajasthan in 2003. Bora later served as senior resident In the Dept of Surgical Gastroenterology, SGPGI Lucknow between 2004-2005. In 2008, he completed MCh in surgical gastroenterology from Gobind Ballabh Pant Hospital, Maulana Azad Medical College, New Delhi. He also completed a fellowship liver transplantation from Indraprastha Apollo Hospital in 2011.

== Medical career ==
Bora started his medical career as a consultant for surgical gastroenterology in Fortis Hospital Jaipur. Later, he served as a senior resident in gastrointestinal surgery at the Sanjay Gandhi Postgraduate Institute of Medical Sciences in Lucknow.

He joined Indraprastha Apollo Hospital, New Delhi as the consultant in the Department of Hepatobiliary Surgery and Liver Transplantation in 2011. He was in the team and performed 1450 liver transplantations and advanced liver, pancreatic and bile duct operations from 2012 to 2015. In 2016, he was appointed as the Joint Director of Liver Transplantation & Senior Consultant of GI Surgery at Artemis Hospital. In 2020, Bora performed a liver transplant on a one-year old baby

Bora has been a contributor and editor to medical journals, textbooks and clinical publications. He has carried out medical research and published articles on hepatobiliary pancreatic surgery and surgical gastroenterology.

== Awards and recognition ==
- Travel Award of the International Liver Transplant Society in 2012 at San Francisco, USA
- Honoured by the Chief Minister of Rajasthan for performing the first liver transplant in the state
- Young Investigator Award of the International Liver Transplant Society in 2013 at Sydney.
