= Neeraj Kanwar =

Indian businessman (born 1971)

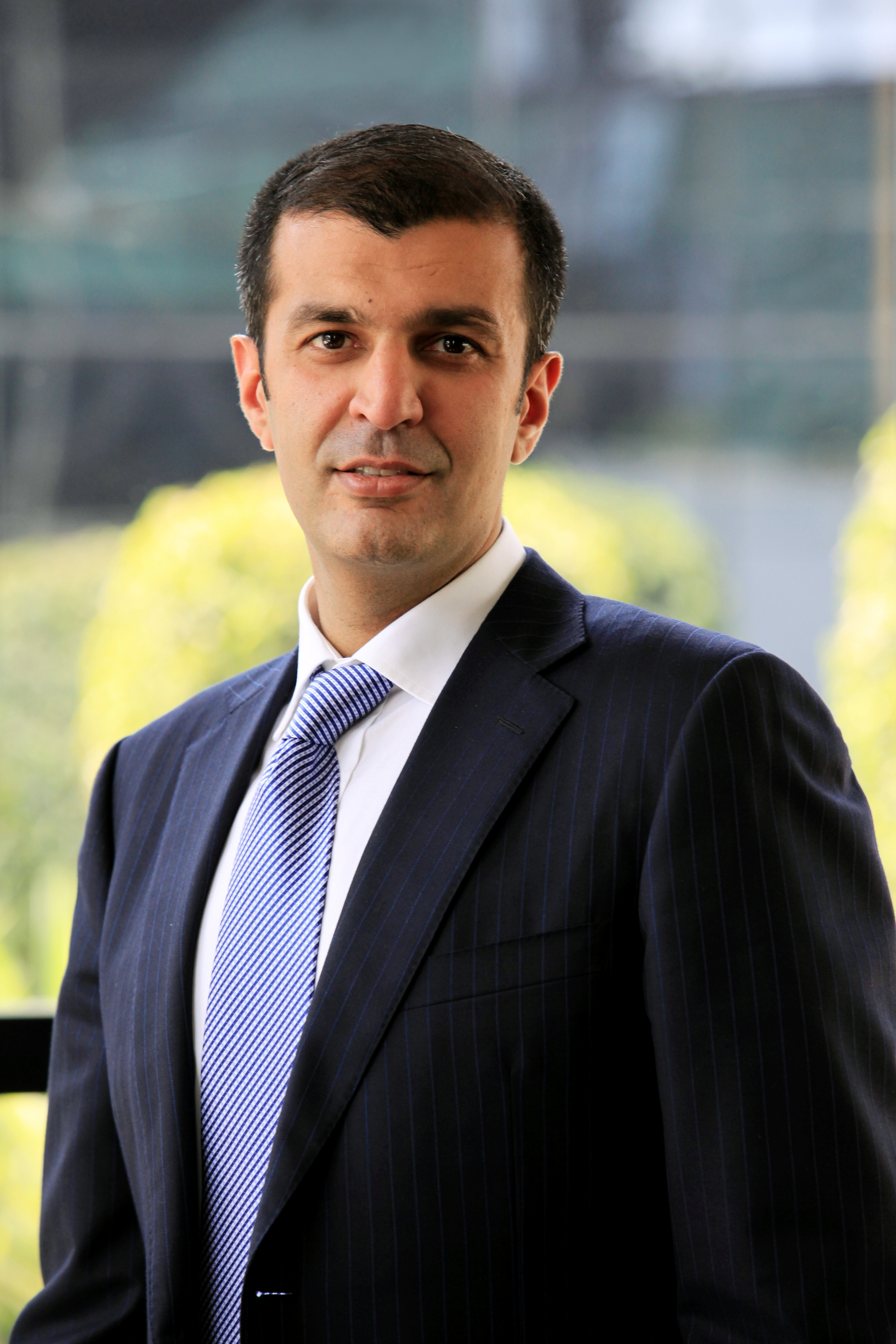
- Born: 6 September 1971 (age 55)
- Education: St. Columba's School, Delhi; Lehigh University
- Occupations: Vice chairman and managing director, Apollo Tyres
- Spouse: Simran Kanwar
- Children: 2
- Parent: Onkar Kanwar

Neeraj Kanwar (born 6 September 1971) is an Indian businessman. He is the vice chairman and managing director of Apollo Tyres.

== Education ==
Kanwar was educated at St. Columba's School, Delhi and thereafter, graduated in engineering from Lehigh University in Pennsylvania, US.

== Career ==
Kanwar started his career with a training stint at American Express Bank in New York City. He thereafter returned to India and started Global Finance Ltd, a non-bank financial institution which shut after three years. In 1985, Kanwar became the third generation of his family to join Apollo Tyres, which was launched by his grandfather Raunaq Singh and later taken over by his father Onkar Kanwar. His first position in the company was in the sales team.

In 2002, Kanwar took over daily operations from his father. Kanwar is the force behind Apollo's international acquisitions. When the company announced its acquisition of Dunlop Tyres, South Africa in 2006, it simultaneously announced Kanwar's elevation as the company's Managing Director. The company later sold most of its South African operations to Sumitomo Rubber Industries in 2013, retaining one plant in Durban.

In 2009, under the aegis of Kanwar, Apollo bought out Vredestein Banden in the Netherlands, thus giving the company a foothold in Europe. Apollo bought Reifencom GmbH in Germany in 2015, giving it access to distribution channels across Europe. After a failed takeover attempt of Cooper Tires in 2013, Kanwar decided to focus on organic growth by investing in new greenfield facilities in Chennai, India and Budapest, Hungary. The Hungary plant was inaugurated in 2017.

== Personal life ==
In partnership with Amit Burman (vice chairman of Dabur), Kanwar bought an Italian restaurant called Scalini in London in 2014. Kanwar and Burman met during their University days in Pennsylvania and remained friends. Apart from his business activities, Kanwar serves as the vice chairman of the British Asian Trust in India, a charity founded by Prince Charles.

Neeraj Kanwar is the second son of Onkar Kanwar and has an elder brother, Raaja Kanwar, and a sister Shalini Kanwar Chand. He married Simran Kanwar and they have two children, son Jai Karan and daughter Sayra Taru. In 2013, he relocated to London to focus on the attempted buyout of Cooper Tires. Though the deal did not work out, Kanwar settled in London to focus on Apollo's international operations and better manage its international investors. Kanwar resides in London's Mayfair neighbourhood.
