= Lonappan Nambadan =

Indian politician (1935–2013)

Member of Legislative Assembly
- In office 1982- 2001
- Preceded by: Jose Thanickal
- Succeeded by: Thomas Unniyadan
- Constituency: Irinjalakuda

Personal details
- Born: 13 November 1935 Thrissur, British India
- Died: 5 June 2013 (aged 77) Kochi, India
- Party: CPI(M)
- Spouse: Annie P.C.
- Children: 1 son and 2 daughters
- As of 23 September, 2006

Lonappan Nambadan (13 November 1935 – 5 June 2013) was an Indian politician from Kerala. He was member of the Kerala Legislative Assembly for six terms from 1977 - 2001 and was a state minister in two E. K. Nayanar ministries. He was a member of the 14th Lok Sabha of India. He represented the Mukundapuram constituency of Kerala and was a member of the Communist Party of India (Marxist) (CPI(M)) political party.

== Biography ==
Nambadan was born on 13 November 1935 at Perambra, as the son of Nambadan Kuriappan and Plamena, in a Catholic Family.He studied in National Boys High School, Kodakara and TTC from District Institute of Education and Training (DIET), Ramavarmapuram, Thrissur. After that he took to the teaching profession, before he became active in public life. He entered politics in 1957 through Indian National Congress and worked as its local President. He was elected to Kodakara panchayat in 1963. He joined Kerala Congress the next year when it was formed and became its President, Kodakara Constituency Committee.

Nambadan was elected to the Kerala Legislative Assembly in 1977, 1980 and 1982 from Kodakara constituency as a Kerala Congress Candidate. On 15 March 1982, Nambadan voted against the K. Karunakaran -led UDF government which was surviving on the casting vote of Assembly Speaker A. C. Jose. This led to the resignation of the Ministry. Nambadan who was one of the founding leaders of the Kerala Congress resigned from the party. Nambadan had in public cut the veins on his hand earlier to sabotage the attempts of some rebel members led by the E. John Jacob to split the Kerala Congress.

In 1987, 1991 and 1996 Nambadan contested from Irinjalakuda constituency as an Independent candidate backed by the Left Democratic Front. Nambadan served as Transport Minister from 25 January 1980 to 20 October 1981 and as Housing Minister from 2 April 1987 to 17 June 1991, both terms when E. K. Nayanar was the Chief Minister. Nambadan had long fought for the declaration of Malayalam as the official language used in official transactions of the state. He had burnt English copies of legislative bills in the Assembly hall and his supporters had to undergo several days of imprisonment for shouting slogans demanding introduction of Malayalam as official language. A formal declaration to this effect was made by the state government in 2012.

In 2004 he was elected to the Lok Sabha from the Mukundapuram constituency, defeating Karunakaran's daughter Padmaja Venugopal by a margin of more than a lakh votes.

Popularly known as Nambadan Mash (short for master), he was known for his quirky oratorical skills and theatrics which he used unsparingly in attacking rivals. A theatre activist, he had acted in two films. He played the late Bengal Chief Minister Jyoti Basu in Shaji N. Karun's documentary film on Communist leader A. K. Gopalan, titled AKG. Nambadan also authored a few books including the collection Ningalude Swantham Nambadan. His autobiography is titled Sancharikkunna Viswasi. He received the 2012 Abu Dhabi Sakthi Award in other categories of literature for this work.

== Posts held ==
- 1977 - 2001 : Member, Kerala Legislative Assembly (six terms)
- 1980-1982: Minister, Transport, Government of Kerala
- 1987-1991 Minister, Housing, Government of Kerala
- 2004-2009: Member, 14th Lok Sabha
