= 1970 Kerala Legislative Assembly election =

- 17 September 1970

All 133 seats in the Kerala Legislative Assembly 67 seats needed for a majority
- Turnout: 75.29% (▼0.38%)
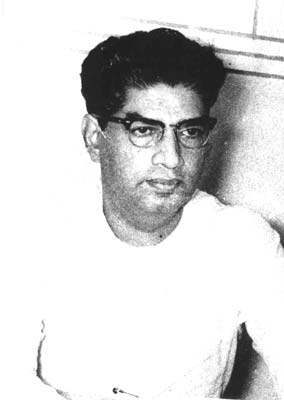

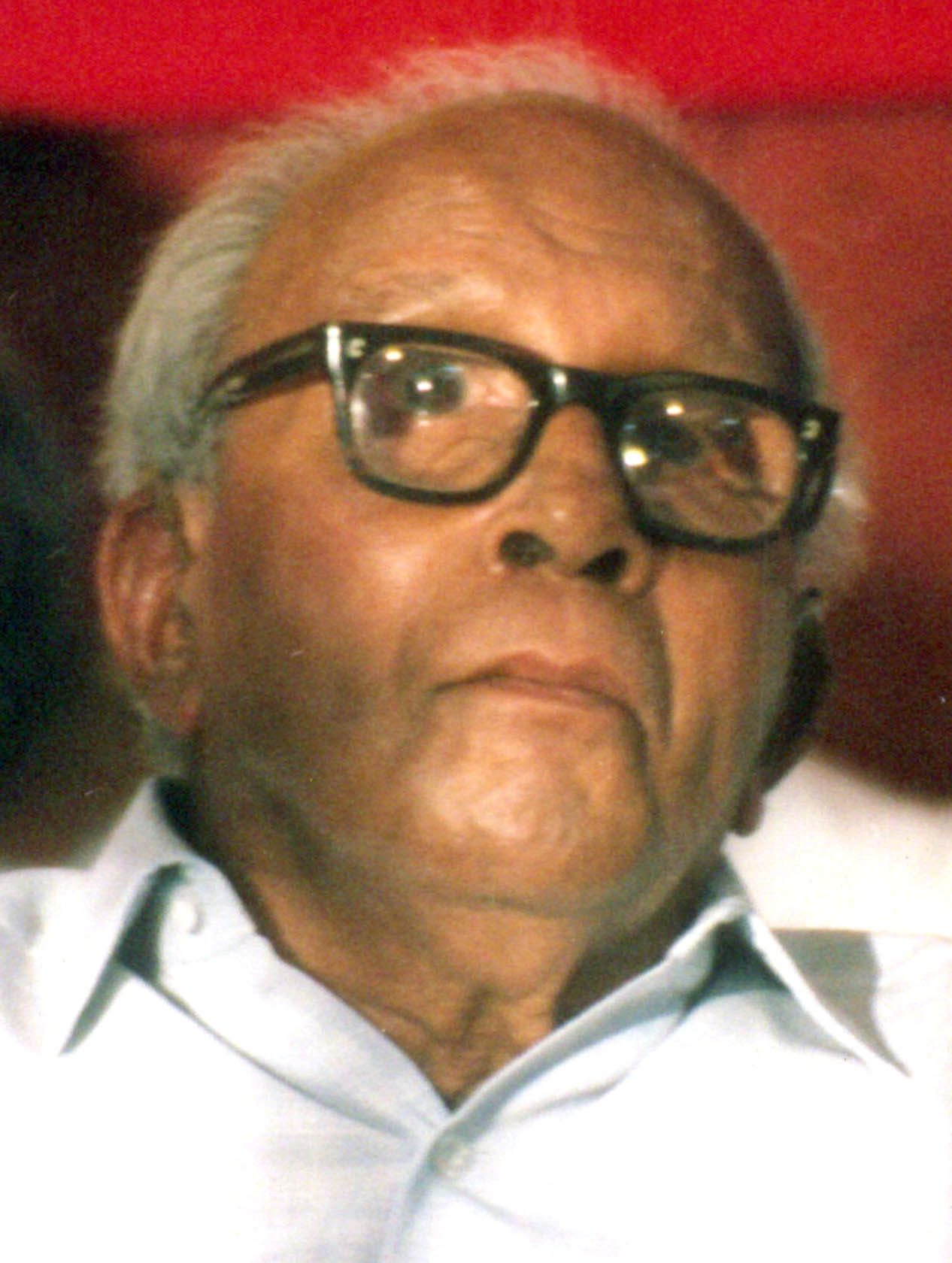
	First party	Second party
Leader	R. Sankar	E. M. S. Namboodiripad
Party	INC	CPI(M)
Leader's seat		Pattambi
Last election	9	52
Seats won	30	29
Seat change	▲21	▼23
- Kerala, India; Kerala, one of the states in South India, has an electorate of more than 21 million people.
Chief Minister before election
C. Achutha Menon
CPI
Elected Chief Minister
C. Achutha Menon
CPI

Elections were held on 17 September 1970 to elect members of the fourth Niyamasabha. The United Front, led by CPI, IUML, RSP, and with the external support from INC, won plurality of seats and formed the government, with C. Achutha Menon as the Chief Minister.

== Results ==
=== Party Wise Results ===
Party Wise Results
Party	Seats
Indian National Congress	30
Communist Party of India (Marxist)	29
Communist Party of India	16
Independent	16
Kerala Congress	12
Indian Union Muslim League	11
Revolutionary Socialist Party	6
Samyukta Socialist Party	6
Praja Socialist Party	3
Indian Socialist Party	3
Kerala Socialist Party	1
Total	133

=== Constituency Wise Results ===
Detailed constituency-wise Results
Sl No.	Constituency Name	Category	Winner Candidates Name	Gender	Party	Vote	Runner-up Candidates Name	Gender	Party	vote
1	Manjeshwar	GEN	M. Ramappa	M	CPI	18686	U. P. Kunikullaya	M	IND	17491
2	Kasaragod	GEN	B. M. Abdul Rahiman	M	IND	27113	K. P. Ballakuraya	M	IND	18736
3	Hosdrug	GEN	N. K. Balakrishnan	M	PSP	29568	K. V. Mohanlal	M	SOP	22224
4	Nileswar	GEN	V. V. Kunhambu	M	CPM	34719	A. P. Abdulla	M	MUL	29348
5	Edakkad	GEN	N. Ramakrishnan	M	INC	31199	C. Kannan	M	CPM	27559
6	Cannanore	GEN	N. K. Kumaram	M	IND	33544	E. Ahammed	M	MUL	30543
7	Madayi	GEN	M. V. Raghavan	M	CPM	31932	P. Sreedharan	M	INC	24151
Bye Polls in 1970	Madayi	GEN	J.Manjuran	M	ASP	30898	K.Raghavan	M	IND	26896
8	Payyannur	GEN	A. V. Kunhambu	M	CPM	32499	V. P. Narayana Poduval	M	INC	24878
9	Taliparamba	GEN	C. P. Govindan Nambiar	M	INC	31435	K. P. Raghava Podvval	M	CPM	30526
10	Irikkur	GEN	A. Kunhikannan	M	CPM	28766	T. Lohithakshan	M	RSP	27098
11	Kuthuparamba	GEN	Pinarayi Vijayan	M	CPM	28281	Thayath Raghavan	M	PSP	27538
12	Tellicherry	GEN	N. E. Balaram	M	CPI	28171	T. Kunhanandan	M	IND	26711
13	Peringalam	GEN	Soopi K. M.	M	ISP	34003	V. Ashokan	M	INC	25559
14	North Wynad	(ST)	M. V. Rajan	M	INC	26301	M. Kariyan	M	IND	15888
15	Badagara	GEN	M. Krishnan	M	ISP	31716	P. Raghavan Nair	M	INC	29407
16	Nadapuram	GEN	M. Kumaran Master	M	CPI	34761	E. V. Kumaran	M	CPM	30559
17	Meppayur	GEN	A. V. Abdurahiman	M	MUL	30759	M. K. Kelu	M	CPM	28408
18	Quilandy	GEN	E. Narayanan Nair	M	INC	37023	P. K. Appajair	M	ISP	33386
19	Perambra	GEN	K.G. Adyodi	M	INC	35383	V. V. Dakshinamorthy	M	CPM	31304
20	Balusseri	GEN	A. C. Shanamkhadas	M	INC	30896	P. K. Sankarankutty	M	SOP	29699
21	Kunnamangalam	GEN	P. V. S. M. Pookoya Thangal	M	MUL	35599	Kutty Krishan Nairir	M	ISP	23945
22	Kalpetta	GEN	P. Cyriac John	M	INC	29950	K. K. Aboo	M	SOP	19509
23	South Wynad	(ST)	K. Raghavan Master	M	INC	28337	M. Ramunni	M	SOP	16123
24	Calicut- I	GEN	P. V. Sankana Narayanan	M	INC	30416	Thay T. Sankaran	M	IND	26619
25	Calicut- II	GEN	Kalpally Madhava Menon	M	IND	29946	P. M. Aboobackar	M	MUL	26803
26	Beypore	GEN	K. Chathunni Master	M	CPM	30260	P. K. Ummar Khan	M	MUL	27945
27	Tirurangadi	GEN	K. Avukadarkutty Naha	M	MUL	32608	Kunhalikutty Alias	M	IND	31893
28	Tanur	GEN	Sayed Ummer Bhafaki	M	MUL	35960	U.K. Damodaran	M	IND	13813
29	Tirur	GEN	K. M. Kutty	M	MUL	28634	R. Muhammed	M	IND	24842
30	Mankada	GEN	M. Moideen Kutty	M	MUL	30779	Paloli Mahammed Kutty	M	CPM	24438
31	Kondotty	GEN	C H Md Koya Haji	M	MUL	40208	Moosa Haji	M	IND	22612
32	Malappuram	GEN	U. A. Beeran	M	MUL	39682	V. T. N. Kutty Nair	M	IND	22379
33	Manjeri	(SC)	K. P. Raman	M	MUL	23882	O. Kowan	M	ISP	17190
34	Nilambur	GEN	M. P. Gangadharan	M	INC	26798	P. V. Kunhikannan	M	CPM	23987
Bye Polls in 1970	Nilambur	GEN	M.P.Gangadharan	M	IND	30802	V.P.Abocbakar	M	CPM	25228
35	Perinthalmanna	GEN	K. S. Thangal	M	MUL	28436	E. K. Imbichi Bava	M	CPM	23865
36	Ponnani	GEN	Hajee M. V. Hydros	M	IND	31329	V. P. Cherukoyathangal	M	MUL	27207
37	Thrithala	(SC)	V. Eacharan	M	IND	25822	E. T. Kunhan	M	CPM	24690
38	Kuttippuram	GEN	Chakkeri Ahammed Kutty	M	MUL	30081	M. Habeeburahiman	M	IND	23870
39	Pattambi	GEN	E. M. S. Namboodiripad	M	CPM	27851	E. R. Gopalon	M	CPI	24419
40	Ottapalam	GEN	P. P. Krishnan	M	CPM	22056	Leela Damodara Menon	M	INC	19817
41	Sreekrishnapuram	GEN	C. Govinda Panicker	M	CPM	21647	K. Sukumaran Unni	M	INC	19114
42	Mannarghat	GEN	John Manforan	M	CPM	23633	Krishnan	M	CPI	19802
43	Palghat	GEN	R. Krishnan	M	CPM	23113	A. Chandran Nair	M	IND	17653
44	Malampuzha	GEN	V. Krishnadas	M	CPM	38358	C. M. Undaram	M	IND	18505
45	Chittur	GEN	K. A. Sivaama Bharrathy	M	SOP	24579	Sunna Sahib	M	NCO	13152
46	Kollengode	GEN	C. Vasudeva Menon	M	CPM	29826	K. A. Chandran	M	NCO	16357
47	Alathur	GEN	R. Krishnan	M	CPM	34193	P. M. Adulrahiman	M	IND	17735
48	Kuzhalmannam	(SC)	P. Kunhan	M	CPM	31784	K. Chandrasekharasastry	M	RSP	16230
49	Chelakara	(SC)	K. K. Balakrishan	M	INC	25270	K. S. Sankaran	M	CPM	22964
50	Wadakkanchery	GEN	A. S. N. Nambisan	M	CPM	27066	N. K. Seshan	M	PSP	25067
51	Kunnamkulam	GEN	T. K. Krishnan	M	CPM	31767	K. P. Vishwanathan	M	INC	27439
52	Manalur	GEN	N. I. Devassykutty	M	INC	37463	A. V. Aryan	M	CPM	25992
53	Trichur	GEN	Joseph Mundassery	M	IND	25695	P. A. Antony	M	INC	23965
Bye Polls in 1972	Trichur	GEN	P.A.Antony	M	INC	30501	V.R.R.Krishan	M	IND	26637
54	Ollur	GEN	R. R. Francis	M	INC	31845	M. A. Karthikeyan	M	CPM	29406
55	Irinjalakuda	GEN	C. S. Gangadharan	M	KSP	25543	C. K. Rajan	M	CPI	17729
56	Kodakara	GEN	C. Achutha Menon	M	CPI	23926	N. V. Sreedharan	M	SOP	20775
57	Chalakkudy	GEN	P. P. George	M	INC	32223	T. L. Joseph	M	IND	22794
58	Mala	GEN	K. Karunakaran	M	INC	30364	Varghese Mechery	M	IND	19311
59	Guruvayoor	GEN	V. Vadakkan	M	IND	26036	B. V. Seethi Thangal	M	MUL	20987
60	Nattika	GEN	V. K. Gopinathan	M	SOP	28080	K. S. Nair	M	CPI	26352
61	Cranganore	GEN	E. Gopalakrishna Menon	M	CPI	24819	P. V. Abdul Khader	M	IND	24287
62	Ankamali	GEN	A. P. Kurian	M	CPM	26626	G. Areekal	M	INC	25320
63	Vadakkekara	GEN	Balauandan	M	CPM	32541	K. A. Balan	M	CPI	29750
64	Parur	GEN	K. T. George	M	INC	28104	P. Gangadharan	M	CPM	26155
65	Narakkal	GEN	M. K. Raghavan	M	INC	27973	A. S. Purushothaman	M	CPM	27237
66	Mattancherry	GEN	K. J. Hersehal	M	IND	38580	M. P. Mohamed Jaffarkhan	M	MUL	17460
67	Palluruthy	GEN	B. Wellingdan	M	IND	33449	M. A. Sarojini	M	PSP	24934
68	Thrippunithura	GEN	Paul P. Mani	M	INC	30466	T. K. Ramakrishnan	M	CPM	30106
69	Ernakulam	GEN	A. L. Jacob	M	INC	27159	M. M. Lawrence	M	CPM	22117
70	Alwaye	GEN	A. A. Kochunny	M	INC	30179	M. K. A. Hameed	M	IND	28055
71	Perumbavoor	GEN	P. I. Poulose	M	INC	28682	P. K Gopalan Nair	M	CPM	24241
72	Kunnathunad	(SC)	T. A. Paraman	M	RSP	29940	M. K. Krishnan	M	CPM	26063
73	Kothamangalam	GEN	M. I. Markose	M	IND	22930	T. M. Meethian	M	CPM	21603
74	Muvattupuzha	GEN	Pennamma Jacob	M	IND	20651	P. V. Abraham	M	CPI	18527
75	Thodupuzha	GEN	P. J. Joseph	M	KEC	19750	U. K. Chacko	M	IND	18115
76	Karimannoor	GEN	A. C. Chacko	M	KEC	17689	G. P. Krishnapillai	M	RSP	13077
77	Devicolam	(SC)	G. Varadan	M	CPM	14838	N. Ganapathy	M	INC	11949
78	Udumbanchola	GEN	Sebastian Thomas	M	KEC	24917	V. M. Vikraman	M	CPM	19296
79	Peermade	(SC)	K. I. Rajan	M	CPM	13896	Chollamuthu Thangamuthu	M	CPI	13013
80	Kanjirappally	GEN	Kurian K. V.	M	KEC	22307	Ramachandran M. G	M	CPM	20700
81	Vazhoor	GEN	K. Narayana Kurup	M	KEC	20353	M. O. Joseph	M	IND	12157
82	Changanacherry	GEN	K. L Chacko	M	KEC	22709	K. P. Rajagopalan Nair	M	IND	18892
83	Puthuppally	GEN	Oommen Chandy	M	IND	29784	E. M. George	M	CPM	22496
84	Kottayam	GEN	M. Thomas	M	CPM	26147	K. George Thomas	M	NCO	14190
85	Ettumanoor	GEN	P. B. R. Pillai	M	SOP	23171	M. M. Joseph	M	KEC	18130
86	Akalakunnam	GEN	J. A. Chacko	M	KEC	24500	A. M. Somanadhan	M	IND	14040
87	Poonjar	GEN	K. M. George	M	KEC	26181	V. T. Thomas	M	IND	14042
88	Palai	GEN	K. M. Mani	M	KEC	23350	M. M. Jacob	M	INC	22986
89	Kaduthuruthy	GEN	O. Lukose	M	KEC	22927	K. K. Joseph	M	CPM	20555
90	Vaikom	GEN	P. S. Srinivasan	M	CPI	25491	K. Viswanathan	M	IND	25028
91	Aroor	GEN	K. R. Gouri	M	CPM	34095	C. G. Sadasivan	M	CPI	28868
92	Sherthala	GEN	A. K. Antony	M	INC	28419	N. P. Thandar	M	CPM	28059
93	Mararikulam	GEN	S. Damodaran	M	CPM	37753	N. S. P. Panicker	M	RSP	30346
94	Alleppey	GEN	T. V. Thomas	M	CPI	27964	N. Swayamavaran	M	IND	18954
95	Ambalapuzha	GEN	V. S. Achuthanandan	M	CPM	28596	K. K. Kumara Pillai	M	RSP	25828
96	Kuttanad	GEN	Thalavady Oommen	M	SOP	27372	Thomas John	M	KEC	21866
97	Haripad	GEN	C. B. C. Warrier	M	CPM	30562	Thachady Prabhakaran	M	INC	23720
98	Kayamkulam	GEN	Thundathil Kunjukrishna Pillai	M	INC	32278	P. R. Vasu	M	CPM	28012
99	Thiruvalla	GEN	E. John Jacob	M	KEC	24938	Vengal PK Mathew	M	ISP	20426
100	Kallooppara	GEN	T. S. John	M	KEC	17894	N. T. George	M	CPM	15431
101	Aranmula	GEN	P. N. Chandrasenan	M	IND	21934	T. N. Upendra Natha Kurup	M	IND	15367
102	Chengannur	GEN	P. G. Purushothaman Pillai	M	CPM	21687	Saraswathi Rugmini	M	KEC	19443
103	Mavelikara	GEN	Gopinatha Pillai	M	ISP	24907	P. Krishna Pillai	M	PSP	22395
104	Pandalam	(SC)	Damodaran Kalassery	M	INC	35369	C. Velutha Kunju	M	CPM	28261
105	Ranni	GEN	Jacob Skariah	M	IND	16136	Sunny Panavely	M	IND	15559
106	Pathanamthitta	GEN	Kulappurakkal Karunakaran Nair	M	IND	25635	Vayala Idicula	M	KEC	24908
107	Konni	GEN	P. J. Thomas	M	INC	30027	R. C. Unnithan	M	CPM	23581
108	Pathanapuram	(SC)	P. K. Raghava	M	CPI	24654	P. K. Kunjachan	M	CPM	17002
109	Punalur	GEN	K. Krishna Pillai	M	CPI	25407	V. Bharathan	M	CPM	21981
110	Chadayamangalam	GEN	M. N. Gobindani Nair	M	CPI	31372	P. R. Baskaran Nair	M	SOP	19945
111	Kottarakkara	GEN	Kottara Gopalakrishnan	M	INC	32536	R. Balakrishnan Pillai	M	KEC	27859
Bye Polls in 1970	Kottarakkara	GEN	C. Achutha Menon	M	CPI	44472	P.S.Nair	M	IND	18409
112	Kunnathur	(SC)	Sathyapalan	M	RSP	29008	Onamplam Prabhakaran	M	IND	17528
113	Adoor	GEN	Thengamam Balakrishnan	M	CPI	23285	K G Damodharan Unnithan	M	CPM	20005
114	Krishnapuram	GEN	P. Unnikrishnan Pillai	M	CPI	33679	P. A. Harriz	M	ISP	24052
115	Karunagappally	GEN	Baby John	M	RSP	36681	Samba Sivan	M	IND	24105
116	Quilon	GEN	T. K. Divakaran	M	RSP	27220	P. K. Sukumaran	M	CPM	16119
117	Kundara	GEN	A. A. Rahim	M	INC	36043	Stanudevan	M	CPM	21827
118	Eravipuram	GEN	R. S. Unni	M	RSP	35631	Kaikara Shamsu Deen	M	SOP	17129
119	Chathannoor	GEN	P. Ravindran	M	CPI	28730	S. Thankappan Pillai	M	KEC	14782
120	Varkala	GEN	Majid T. A.	M	CPI	26444	Radhakrishnan V	M	CPM	20630
121	Attingal	GEN	Vakkom Purushothaman	M	INC	33637	V. Sreedharan	M	CPM	22106
122	Kilimanoor	GEN	P. K. Chanthan	M	CPI	29425	C. K. Balakrishnan	M	CPM	21274
123	Vamanapuram	GEN	M. Kunjukrishna Pillai	M	INC	23122	Vasudevan Pillai	M	CPM	21305
124	Ariyanad	GEN	Soma Sekharan Nair	M	SOP	18401	Aboobaker Kunju	M	RSP	12845
125	Nadumangad	GEN	K. G. Kunjukrishna Pillai	M	CPI	21548	V. Sahadevan	M	IND	17786
126	Kazhakuttam	GEN	P. Neelakantan	M	SOP	23425	A. Essuddin	M	MUL	23314
127	Trivandrum I	GEN	N. Gopala Pillai	M	PSP	23458	E. P. Eapen	M	SOP	16306
128	Trivandrum I I	GEN	K. Pankajakshan	M	RSP	33823	Perumthan Somron Nair	M	CPM	18104
129	Nemom	GEN	G. Kuttapan	M	PSP	29800	M. Sadasivan	M	CPM	17701
130	Kovalam	GEN	M. Kunj Krishna Nadar	M	IND	16747	P. Fakir Khan	M	CPM	14618
131	Vilappil	GEN	S. Varadarajan Nair	M	INC	27932	M. N. Balakrishnan	M	ISP	20919
132	Neyyattinkara	GEN	R. Para Meswaran Pillai	M	CPM	23406	R. Janardhanan Nair	M	CPI	16514
133	Parassala	GEN	M. Sathyanesan	M	CPM	20512	N. Sundram Nadar	M	INC	16231
