= R. Bindu =

Indian politician

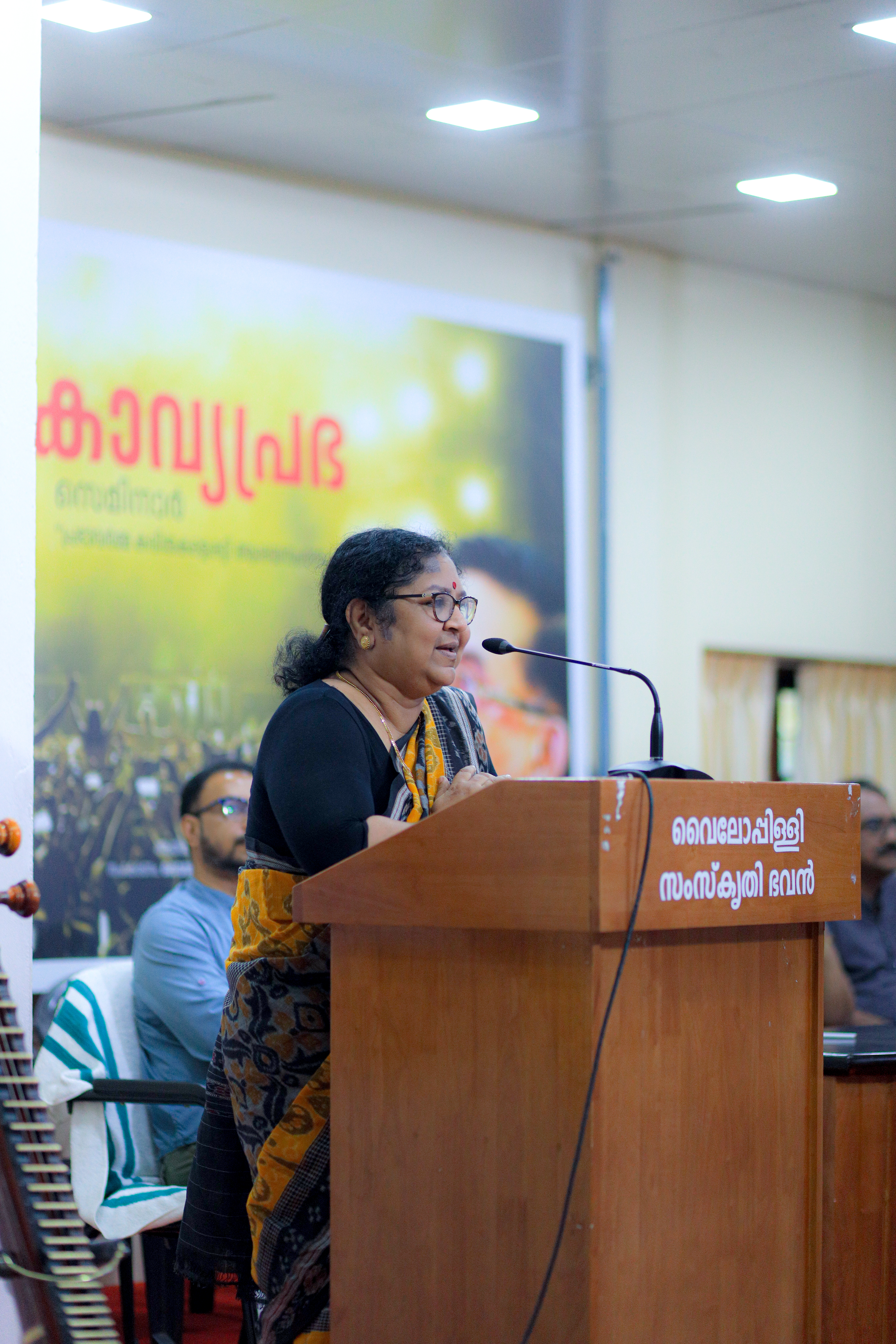

Minister of Higher Education and Social Justice
- In office 20 May 2021-17 May 2026
- Preceded by: K. T. Jaleel
- Succeeded by: Roji M. John

Member of the Kerala Legislative Assembly
- In office 2021–2026
- Preceded by: K. U. Arunan
- Succeeded by: Thomas Unniyadan
- Constituency: Irinjalakuda

Mayor of Thrissur
- In office 7 October 2005 – 6 October 2010
- Preceded by: Jose Kattukkaran
- Succeeded by: I. P. Paul

Personal details
- Born: May 31, 1967 (age 59) Irinjalakuda, Thrissur, Kerala, India
- Party: Communist Party of India (Marxist)
- Spouse: A. Vijayaraghavan
- Children: A. Harikrishnan
- Education: Jawaharlal Nehru University, New Delhi; University of Calicut; Sree Kerala Varma College, Thrissur; St. Joseph's College, Irinjalakuda

Radhakrishnan Bindu (born 31 May 1967), is an Indian politician of CPI(M), who served as Minister for Higher Education and Social Justice, Government of Kerala from 2021 to 2026.

== Early life and education ==
Bindu was born in 1967 as the daughter of N. Radhakrishnan and K. K. Shanthakumari. She completed her education in Irinjalakkuda Girls' High School, St. Joseph's College, Irinjalakuda, and JNU Delhi. She holds a MA in English Literature and an MPhil and PhD. Bindu entered social activities through student politics.

== Career ==
Bindu is a former Mayor of the Thrissur Municipal Corporation, Kerala. She is the first woman minister from Thrissur district. She is also the first woman MLA from Irinjalakuda constituency. Bindu was the Vice Principal and Head of English Department at Sree Kerala Varma College, Thrissur. She was the member of the senate and syndicate of the Calicut University. She is the central committee member of AIDWA and also has close association with All India Democratic Women's Association.

Bindu is married to A. Vijayaraghavan, former parliamentarian and Former Secretary of the CPI(M) Kerala State Committee.

== Controversies and criticism ==
=== Eyeglasses reimbursement controversy (2023) ===
In 2023, R. Bindu, Minister for Higher Education in Kerala, faced criticism after the state government sanctioned ₹30,500 from the public exchequer for the reimbursement of eyeglasses purchased by her.

The expenditure drew public and political attention, particularly in the context of the state’s financial constraints. Opposition leaders criticised the reimbursement as an unnecessary expense and questioned the timing of the sanction.

Bindu defended the reimbursement, stating that it was permitted under existing rules and that similar reimbursements had been availed by other legislators.

The issue led to protests by opposition groups and generated discussion on public expenditure and governance priorities.

=== Governor–government conflict in higher education ===
During her tenure, R. Bindu was involved in an ongoing institutional conflict between the state government and the Governor of Kerala, who serves as Chancellor of state universities. The dispute primarily concerned the appointment of vice-chancellors and the extent of government involvement in university administration.

The Governor criticised the minister’s role in vice-chancellor appointments, including allegations that she had exceeded her authority in recommending candidates.

The minister, in turn, criticised actions by the Governor, alleging interference in the higher education system and raising concerns about ideological influence in academic institutions. The issue led to legal and political disputes involving university governance.

=== University administration and intervention controversies ===
The Higher Education Department under R. Bindu also faced criticism over alleged administrative interventions in universities. In one instance, officials conducted an inspection at APJ Abdul Kalam Technological University following a complaint regarding denial of PhD admission, which led to allegations of overreach and procedural violations.

University authorities raised concerns regarding the legality of such interventions, while the government stated that the actions were taken in response to complaints and were part of administrative oversight.

=== Policy disagreements with central education bodies ===
R. Bindu was also involved in policy disagreements with central institutions such as the University Grants Commission (UGC). The Kerala government rejected a draft undergraduate curriculum framework proposed by the UGC, with the minister stating that it undermined university autonomy and imposed ideological frameworks.

The decision led to broader debates on federalism, academic autonomy, and the role of central agencies in higher education.

=== Political context ===
The controversies involving R. Bindu have taken place within the broader political landscape of Kerala, characterised by competition between the Communist Party of India (Marxist)-led Left Democratic Front and the Indian National Congress-led United Democratic Front, where education policy issues often become subjects of political debate.
