= Onkar Kanwar =

Indian businessman

- Born: March 1942 (age 84); Sialkot, British India (now in Pakistan)
- Education: California State University
- Occupation: Businessman
- Known for: Chairman and MD, Apollo Tyres
- Spouse: Taru Kanwar
- Children: 3
- Parent: Raunaq Singh

Onkar Kanwar (born March 1942) is an Indian businessman, chairman of Apollo Tyres. He is also the chairman of Artemis Global Life Sciences, PTL Enterprises and Premedium Pharmaceuticals Pvt Ltd.

== Early life ==
Onkar Kanwar is the eldest son of Raunaq Singh (1922-2002), the co-founder of Apollo Tyres, and his first wife.

== Career ==
After his undergraduate degree in business administration and industrial engineering, Onkar worked as a salesman in Riverside, California working on estimates for different government contracts for about six months. He then worked for Abbey Etna Machine Company in Perrysburg, Ohio on the shop floor. The president of Etna Company after discussions with the Kanwar family and looking at the perseverance of Onkar invested money to start a new pipe factory in India.

Kanwar has grown Apollo Tyres from a small single-plant Indian company into a multinational with seven plants worldwide, and annual revenues in excess of US$3 billion. In June 2013, it was reported that Apollo Tyres would buy US-based Cooper Tire & Rubber Company for about $2.5 billion in a deal that would make it the world's seventh-largest tyre maker, but the takeover collapsed after legal battles.

Kanwar also owns speciality hospitals under the Artemis brand in northern India.

Kanwar was the president of Federation of Indian Chambers of Commerce & Industry for 2004-05. He is the chairman of the BRICS Business Council, India which was established during the Fifth BRICS Summit held in March 2013 in Durban, South Africa.

Kanwar is the recipient of an Ernst and Young Entrepreneur of the Year Award for India, in the manufacturing category in 2012. In October 2018, Kanwar was awarded ‘Order of Merit’ of Hungary, in recognition of his work towards strengthening Hungarian-Indian economic relations through the company’s investment in Hungary, thereby helping create new jobs in Hungary In November 2018, Kanwar was conferred with Japanese honour 'Order of the Rising Sun', Gold and Silver Star. The honor, awarded by Prime Minister Shinzo Abe in the presence of Emperor Akihito, was in honor of Kanwar’s contributions towards strengthening the economic relations between Japan and India and for promoting Japanese companies’ entry into the Indian market.

== Personal life ==
Kanwar is married, has three children, and lives in Delhi. His eldest child is his daughter Shalini who lives in Singapore. His elder son Raaja Kanwar, Chairman and Managing Director of Apollo International Limited and Apollo Supply Chain, leads a global conglomerate with diverse businesses in EPC, logistics, automotive components, retail and lifestyle industry and his younger son Neeraj Kanwar is vice-chairman and managing director of Apollo Tyres.

== Honours ==
- Order of the Rising Sun, 2nd Class, Gold and Silver Star (2018)
