= K. U. Arunan =

Indian politician

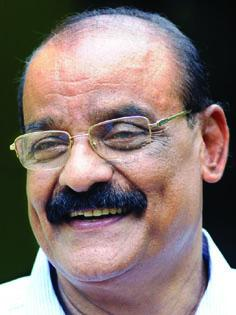

Member of Legislative Assembly
- In office 2016 – May 2021
- Preceded by: Thomas Unniyadan
- Succeeded by: R. Bindu
- Constituency: Irinjalakkuda

Personal details
- Born: 24 September 1947 (age 78)
- Party: Communist Party of India (Marxist)
- Spouse: Smt. Manjula
- Children: Two daughters

Prof. K. U. Arunan is an Indian politician who was a member in the 14th Kerala Assembly. representing Irinjalakuda Assembly constituency and belongs to the Communist Party of India (Marxist).

In 2017, the Thrissur district leadership of the Communist Party of India (Marxist) sought an explanation from him for inaugurating a program organized by the Rashtriya Swayamsevak Sangh.
