= Kizhuthani =

Village in Kerala, India

Kizhuthani is a village in Thrissur district of Kerala, India. It is a part of Karalam Panchayat ward number 7 and 8. Irinjalakuda is the nearest town.
