= Apollo Tyres =

Indian tyre manufacturing company

Apollo Tyres Limited

- An Apollo tyre on a Kia vehicle
- Type: Public
- Traded as: NSE: APOLLOTYRE; BSE: 500877
- ISIN: INE438A01022
- Industry: Tyres
- Founded: 1972; 54 years ago
- Headquarters: Gurugram, Haryana, India (Corporate); Kochi, Kerala, India (Registered)
- Key people: Onkar Kanwar (Chairman); Neeraj Kanwar (Vice Chairman & MD)
- Revenue: ▲₹26,211 crore (US$2.7 billion) (2025)
- Operating income: ▼₹1,714 crore (US$180 million) (2025)
- Net income: ▼₹1,121 crore (US$120 million) (2025)
- Total assets: ▲₹27,306 crore (US$2.8 billion) (2025)
- Total equity: ▲₹14,765 crore (US$1.5 billion) (2025)
- Number of employees: 17,517 (2025)
- Subsidiaries: Apollo Vredestein; Artemis Hospital
- Website: apollotyres.com

Apollo Tyres Limited is an Indian multinational tyre manufacturing company headquartered in Gurugram, Haryana. It was incorporated in 1972, and its first plant was commissioned in Perambra, Kerala. The company now has five manufacturing units in India, one in the Netherlands and one in Hungary. As of 2024, the company generates 87% of its revenues from India, 11% from Europe and 2% from other countries.

== History ==
Apollo Tyres Limited was incorporated on 28 September 1972 in India as a public limited company and obtained certificate of Commencement of Business on 24 October 1972. The company was promoted by Bharat Steel Tubes, Ltd., Raunaq International Pvt. Ltd., Raunaq & Co. Pvt. Ltd., Raunaq Singh, Mathew T. Marattukalam and Jacob Thomas. In 1975, the company made its Initial public offer of equity shares and its first manufacturing facility was commissioned in Perambra Plant, Thrissur, Kerala, India in 1977, followed by its 2nd plant at Limda, Gujarat, India in 1991. The company acquired Premier Tyres Limited in 1995, which became its 3rd plant at Kochi, Kerala, India. In 2008, it started a new plant at Chennai, Tamil Nadu, India. A year later in 2009, the company acquired the Netherlands-based tyre maker Vredestein Banden B.V. (VBBV) for an undisclosed sum

The company focused on the production of truck tyres in India and introduced its first truck tyre, Rajdhani in India. The company expanded its operation across India and in 1996, expanded operations outside India by acquiring Dunlop's Africa operations. In 2013, it disposed of the Dunlop brand in Africa along with most of the South African operation in a sale to Sumitomo Rubber Industries of Japan. The very same year, it started its Global R&D Centre, in Enschede, the Netherlands.

In 2015, Apollo Tyres bought Germany's Reifencom tyre distributor for €45.6 million. It shifted its corporate office for Europe region to Amsterdam from Enschede, the Netherlands and opened a Global R&D Centre, Asia in Chennai, India a few months later.

In 2016, the company signed an MoU with the Government of Andhra Pradesh to set up a new factory in the state. On 9 January 2018, the Chief Minister of Andhra Pradesh, N Chandrababu Naidu laid the foundation stone for Apollo Tyres' ₹1,800-crore tyre factory in Andhra Pradesh. The plant will come up over a 200-acre site in Chinnapanduru village near Sri City in Tirupati district and produce passenger car radial (PCR) tyres with an initial capacity of 55 lakh (5.5 million) tyres per year and also truck bus radial (TBR) tyres and will serve both domestic and export markets.

The company's second plant in Europe, was inaugurated by the Hungarian Prime Minister, Viktor Orban, in April 2017.

== European operations ==
Apollo Tyres currently sells Apollo and Vredestein (or Maloya) branded tyres in Europe. The company currently operates two tyre factories in Europe; in the Netherlands and in Hungary. The Enschede plant was acquired from Vredestein, the newly built facility southeasterly from Gyöngyöshalász was inaugurated for production on 7 April 2017.

== Anti competition practices ==
In April 2022, the Competition Commission of India raided the headquarters of Apollo Tyres along with other tyre companies like CEAT, MRF (Madras Rubber Factory) and Continental Tyre at multiple locations. Earlier in February the antitrust watch dog had released a statement about fining these tyre companies a total of ₹1,788 crores (of which Apollo Tyres fined ₹425.53 cr.) for sharing price sensitive information among themselves to manage their cartelization of tyre prices for supplies to the public transport corporation of Haryana state. Earlier the All India Tyre Dealers Federation had complained to the Ministry of Corporate Affairs about this cartelization of these companies to increase the tyre prices. The ministry had then referred the case to the CCI.

== Sponsorship ==
On 16 September 2025, Apollo Tyres was announced as the sponsor of the Indian national cricket team in a three-year agreement, covering 121 bilateral matches and 21 ICC fixtures, valued at ₹579 crore (US$60 million).
