= Thomas Unniyadan =

Indian politician (born 1958)

Adv. Thomas Unniyadan MLA
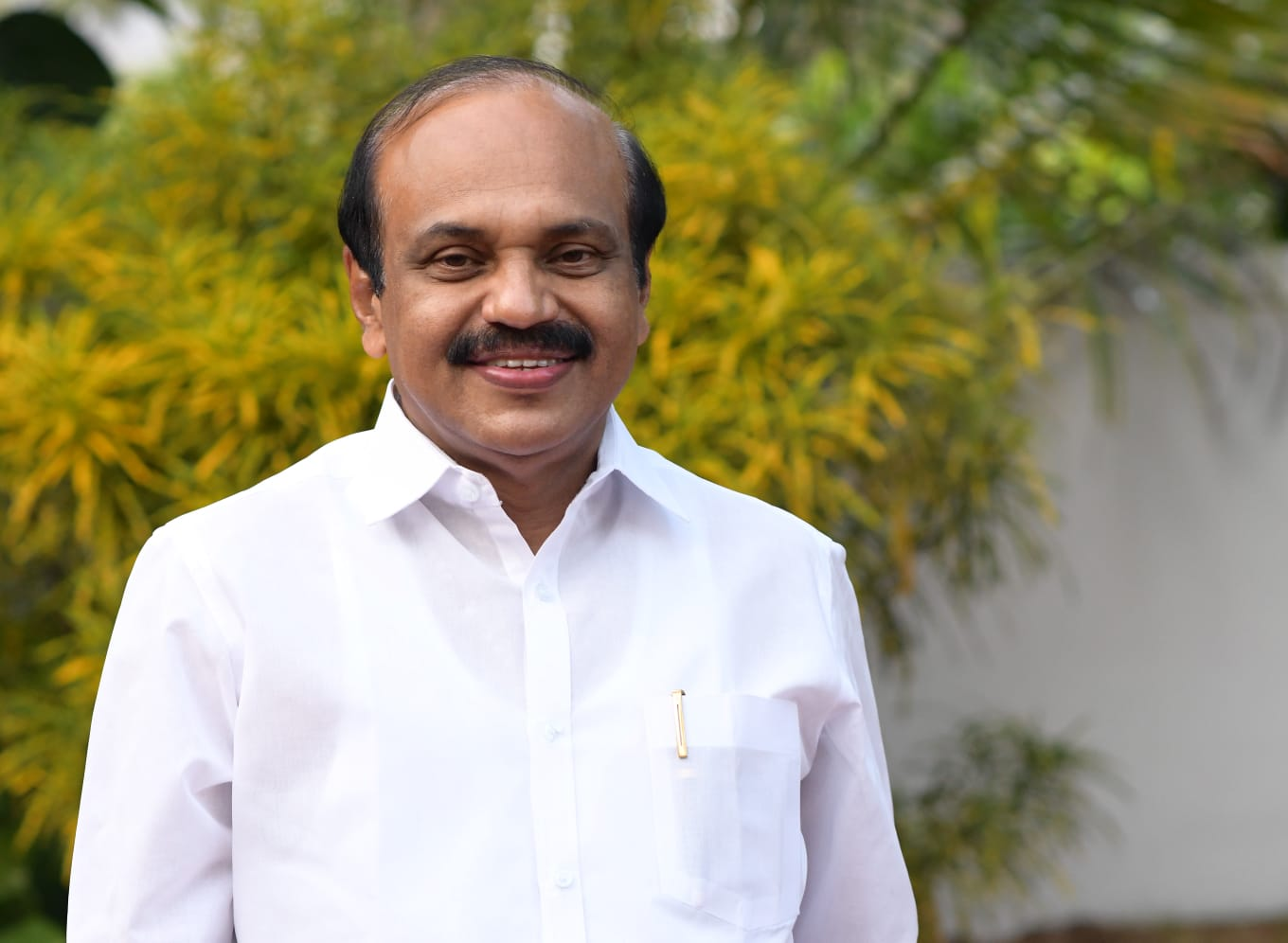

Member of the Kerala State Legislative Assembly
- Incumbent
- Assumed office May 4, 2026
- Preceded by: R. Bindu
- Constituency: Irinjalakuda

Member of the Kerala State Legislative Assembly
- In office 2001 – 2 June 2016
- Preceded by: Lonappan Nambadan
- Succeeded by: K. U. Arunan
- Constituency: Irinjalakuda

Chief Whip

Personal details
- Born: 19 June 1958 (age 68) Vaikom, Kottayam
- Party: Kerala Congress
- Other political affiliations: Kerala Congress (M); Kerala Congress (Joseph)
- Spouse: Smt.Sherly
- Relations: Sri.Mathew Joseph (father); Smt.Mary Joseph (mother); Smt.Sherly (spouse)
- Children: 2 daughters
- Parents: Sri.Mathew Joseph (father); Smt.Mary Joseph (mother)
- Education: B.A. (Devaswom Board College, Thalayolaparambu); LL.B. (Kerala Law Academy Law College, Thiruvananthapuram)

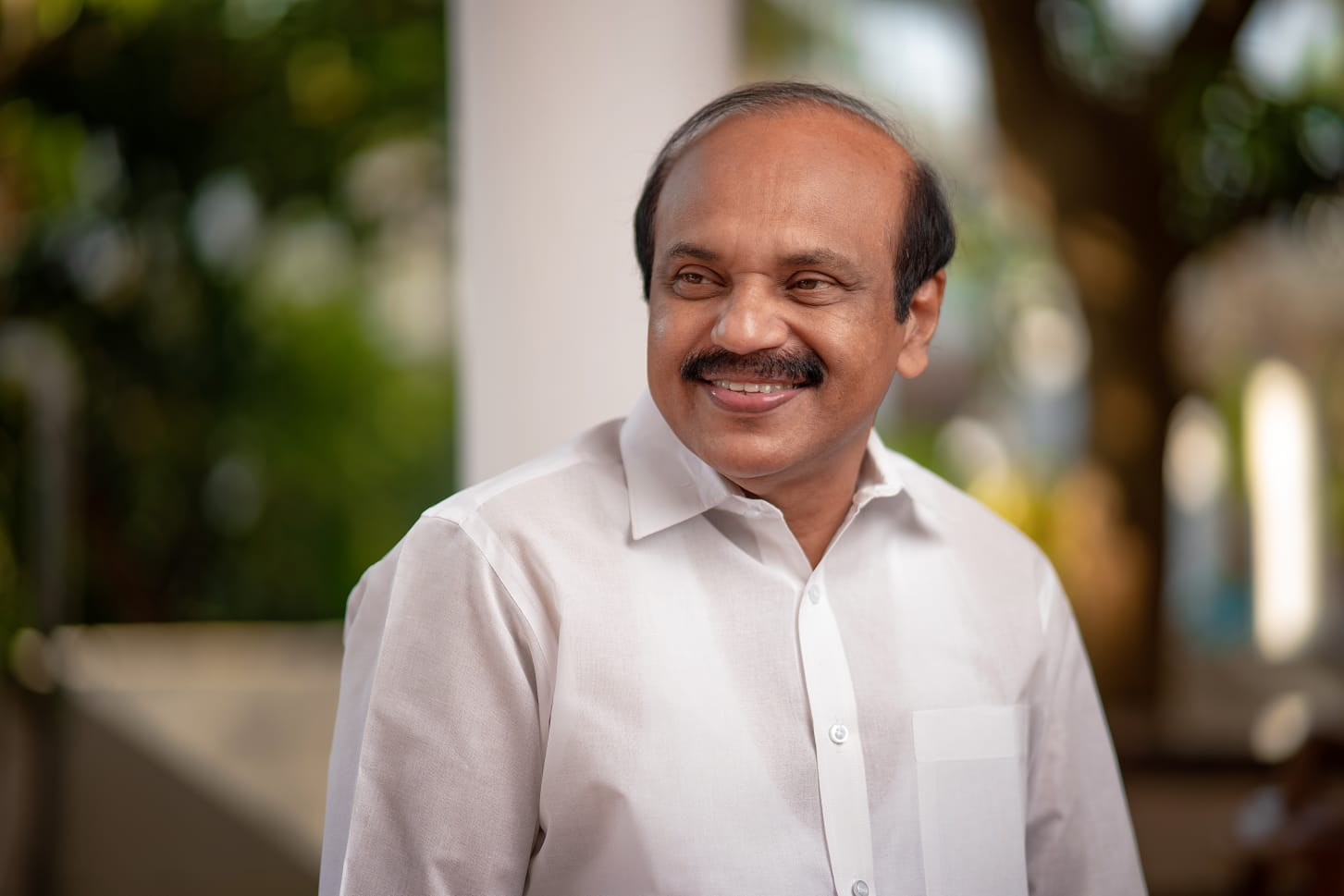
Thomas Unniyadan

Thomas Unniyadan is an Indian politician and Member of the Kerala State Legislative Assembly from Irinjalakuda. He previously served as a member of the Kerala Legislative Assembly from 2001 to 2016 and is a former Government Chief Whip of the Government of Kerala. He is currently the Deputy Chairman of the Kerala Congress.

He was born in Vaikom, the famous temple town in Kottayam district, as the son of Sri. Mathew Joseph and Smt. Mary Joseph. He is an advocate by profession. He was awarded the best MLA multiple times and has achieved several recognitions and awards in the national and international level. He was credited with achieving complete electrification of his constituency and was the first constituency in India to achieve this feat. He was also instrumental in familiarizing computers among school children. He is married to Smt. Sherly, and has two daughters. He is settled in Irinjalakuda.

== Performance in assembly elections ==
Party	1996	Votes
KC(M)	Adv.Thomas Unniyadan	43295
CPI(M)	Lonappan Nambadan	49421
BJP	Biju Menon	6890
BSP	K. K. Ramakrishnan	775
Lost to	Lonappan Nambadan	By 6126

Party	2001	Votes
KC(M)	Adv.Thomas Unniyadan	54242
CPI(M)	T. Sasidharan	53836
BJP	P. Mukundan Menon	5565
IND	Sasidharan	1867
OTH	P. N. Suran	1052
Won	Adv.Thomas Unniyadan	By 406

Party	2006	Votes
KC(M)	Adv.Thomas Unniyadan	58825
CPI(M)	C. K. Chandran (Chembara)	50830
BJP	P. G. Anil Kumar	3796
BSP	P. K. Subrahmanian	586
IND	C. K. Chandran Chenangat	637
OTH	P. N. Suran	564
IND	Thomas Oolakkadan	635
IND	A. A. Thomas	235
Won	Adv.Thomas Unniyadan	By 7995

Party	2011	Votes
KC(M)	Adv.Thomas Unniyadan	68445
CPI(M)	K.R. Vijaya	56041
BJP	K.C. Venugopal	6672
BSP	Subrahmanian	449
OTH	T.V. Sivadasan	772
Won	Adv.Thomas Unniyadan	By 12404

Party	2016	Votes
KC(M)	Adv.Thomas Unniyadan	57019
CPI(M)	Prof. K.U. Arunan	59730
Lost to	Prof. K.U. Arunan	By 2711

Party	2026	Votes
Kerala Congress	Adv.Thomas Unniyadan	66282
CPI(M)	R. Bindu	56070
Won	Adv.Thomas Unniyadan	By 10212

== Political career ==
Unniyadan started his political career as college student union chairman. He joined Kerala Congress and was the Member of Legislative Assembly of Irinjalakuda Constituency in Thrissur District of Kerala from 2001 to 2016. He was the former Legislative petitions committee chairman and also held the positions in various committees as Committee member in State Legislative Subject committee and as a committee member of the Legislative Subordinate Registration Committee. Presently, he is the member of the Kerala State Legislative Assembly after his victory in the 2026 assembly elections and also serves as the deputy chairman of the Kerala Congress party.
