= Perambra, Thrissur =

Perambra
- Town
- Interactive map of Perambra
- Coordinates: 10.30°N 76.33°E
- Country: India
- State: Kerala
- District: Thrissur

Population (2005)
  - Total: 8,000

Languages
  - Official: Malayalam, English
- Time zone: UTC+5:30 (IST)
- PIN: 680689
- Telephone code: 0480
- Vehicle registration: KL-8, KL-45, KL-64
- Nearest city: Chalakudy & Kodakara
- Literacy: 95%
- Lok Sabha constituency: Chalakudy
- Climate: max 34, min 25 (Köppen)

Perambra is a small town located in the Thrissur district of Kerala, South India. It is located on National Highway (NH) 544, 23 km south of the city of Thrissur and about 7 km north of Chalakudy.

Perambra is well known for St. Sebastian's feast and St. Antony's feast. The St. Sebastian's feast is celebrated on January 29 & 30 every year. It's a big feast where a lot of people come and celebrate. St. Antony's feast is celebrated during June every year.

== Government and industry ==
Perambra village map

Administratively, Perambra is part of the Kodakara panchayat and the Chalakudy taluk. Apollo Tyres has a factory in Perambra. It is an agricultural area, although Apollo Tyres is a major employer. Perambra has many rubber estates, nutmeg and rice farms, coconut plantations, cashew nut and pepper farms. Many residents work abroad in Dubai, Saudi Arabia, the UK, and the United States.

== Travel ==
The nearest railway stations are at Chalakudy and Irinjalakuda, both located 7 km from the town. Although Perambra is considered a single block with 1,600 families, NH-544 cuts it into two pieces and there is a need for an underpass at Perambra Junction.

== Religion and infrastructure ==
St. Antony's Church is a pilgrimage center in Perambra. The church's history in the town dates back to 1820, when a chapel was dedicated to St. Anthony of Padua as part of the Chalakudy parish for Sunday mass. In 1830 a church was built, and in 1832 it became an independent parish.

CYM (Catholic Youth Movement) is a youth wing of the Perambra parish. The KCYM (Kerala CYM) has about 100 active members and celebrated its Silver Jubilee in 2010. CYM is involved in blood donation, eye donation, a public library and other social-welfare activities. Perambra was declared a complete blood literacy village on 29 December 2005, when all 8,000 residents had been tested for their blood groups. Perambra was the third village to achieve blood literacy in Kerala, thanks to the CYM initiative.

St. Antony's Church altar

St. Antony's Church

Puthukkavu Temple, one of the oldest Bagavathy temples, is located in Perambra. Thaalapoli maholsavam is celebrated every year on the tenth day of Makaram, featuring nine elephants.

The Government Ayurveda Hospital Perambra, established in the 1940s, moved to Perambra in 1960. This hospital is one of the three government ayurveda hospitals in Kerala where Panchakarma treatment is available.

Perambra is the birthplace of Member of Parliament Lonappan Nambadan, a former teacher and leading figure in the Communist Party who was MP from Mukundapuram from 2004 to 2009.

== Education ==
=== Schools ===
- St. Antonys UP School, Perambra
- St. LIOBA ACADEMY School, Perambra
- Saraswathy Vidyanikethan Senior Secondary School, Perambra
- Heal autism center [ special education school in Kerala]

== See also ==
- Perambra, Kozhikode
- Apollo Tyres
