= C. K. Rajan =

Indian politician

C. K. Rajan (May 1933 – 11 November 2000) was an Indian politician and leader of Communist Party of India. He represented Irinjalakuda constituency in the 3rd Kerala Legislative Assembly.
