= Karalam =

- village
- Location in Kerala, India Karalam (India)
- Coordinates: 10°23′0″N 76°11′0″E
- Country: India
- State: Kerala
- District: Thrissur

Government
  - Body: Karalam Panchayat

Area
  - Total: 17.79 km^{2} (6.87 sq mi)

Population (2011)
  - Total: 16,594
  - Density: 1,032/km^{2} (2,670/sq mi)

Languages
  - Official: Malayalam, English
- Time zone: UTC+5:30 (IST)
- PIN: 680711
- Telephone code: 0480
- Vehicle registration: KL-45
- Nearest city: Irinjalakuda
- Lok Sabha constituency: Thrissur
- Civic agency: Karalam Panchayat

Karalam is a village in Thrissur district in Kerala state of India. It is located 8 km from Irinjalakuda and 18 km from Thrissur.

== Economy ==
Agriculture is the primary industry, but many households have at least one member working abroad, often in the Gulf.

== Transport ==
Bus service connects the village with nearby cities like Thrissur and Irinjalakuda. Buses to Karalam starts from Irinjalakuda Bus Station. Only private buses service to this area. Bus time to Karalam from Irinjalakuda via Kizhuthani are (AM) 6.00, 6.50, 7.50, 8.30, 9.05, 10.00, 10.40, 11.20, 12.05(PM), 12.20, 1.05, 1.45, 2.45, 3.25, 4.00, 5.00, 5.35, 6.15, 6.30, 7.30.

== Colleges and schools ==
- Karalam Lower Primary School
- Rajarshy M L P S, Kizhuthani
- Vellani L P S
- Karalam Vocational Higher Secondary School
- Tharananellur Arts and Science College,
- St. Dominic school Vellani
- Vimala central school Thanissery

== Landmarks ==
=== Kumaranchira temple ===
Karalam is known for its Kumaranchira temple. Only Hindus may enter the temple, but members of other religions also believe in Kumaranchira Bhagavathy (Deity) up to a certain extent and send their offerings to the temple through their Hindu friends or neighbours. The deity is believed to be the sister of the Kodungallur bhagavathy.

=== Karuvannur Puzha ===
This river marks the northern boundary of Karalam Panchayat. The river is the main source of water for agriculture in the village.

=== Holy Trinity Church ===
The only church in Thrissur District in the name of Holy Trinity.

=== Karalam Mosque ===
Karalam Muslim juma masjid

== Festivals ==
- Kumaranchira temple Bharani utsavam (festival) in March which lasts for 2 days.
- Pindi Perunnal in January, second week, every year which lasts for three days.
- Karalam Chandanakudam, March 14, every year.
