= Artemis Hospital =

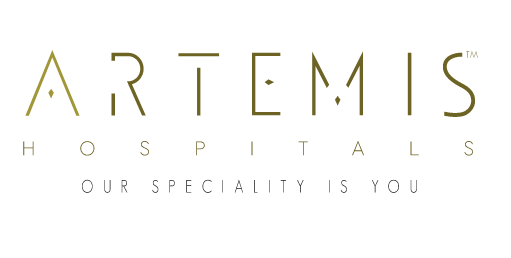

Geography
- Location: Gurgaon, India

Organisation
- Care system: Private

Services
- Beds: 600

History
- Founded: 2007

Links
- Website: http://www.artemishospitals.com
- Lists: Hospitals in India

Artemis Hospital is a multi-specialty tertiary care hospital in Gurgaon, India. Its parent company is the publicly-listed Artemis Medicare Services Limited.

The hospital was founded in 2007 by the promoters of the Apollo Tyres Group. It acquired the NABH accreditation in 2017 and was the first hospital in Gurgaon to be accredited by Joint Commission International (JCI) in 2013.

It is a 600-bed hospital, which has been involved in rare medical procedures like cerebral palsy, emergency cases and paediatric heart care.
