= Muriyad =

- village
- Location in Kerala, India Muriyad (India)
- Coordinates: 10°22′0″N 76°16′0″E
- Country: India
- State: Kerala
- District: Thrissur

Government
  - Type: Panchayati raj (India)
  - Body: Gram panchayat

Population (2011)
  - Total: 7,662

Languages
  - Official: Malayalam, English
- Time zone: UTC+5:30 (IST)
- PIN: 680683
- Vehicle registration: KL-45

Muriyad is a village in Mukundapuram taluk Thrissur district in the state of Kerala, India.

== History ==
It is one of the villages formed out of the old Thazhekkad proverti. Anandapuram village comes under muriyad gramapanchayat. Parekkattukara and Vezhakkattukara are ul_desoms of Muriyad village. Kunnathara is the most historic place which consists kunnathrukkovu Siva temple and Sastha temple. Puvasserikavu Bhagavathi temple, Vattaparambu Siva vishnu temple, Kandankulangara Durga temple are also known. Global Head quarters of Church of Light Emperor Emmanuel Zion (C.L.E.E.Z) an independent Christian church is situated on Zion Campus, Muriyad.

== Demographics ==
As of 2011 India census, Muriyad had a population of 7662 with 3620 males and 4042 females.
