= Apollo Vredestein =

Dutch tyre manufacturer

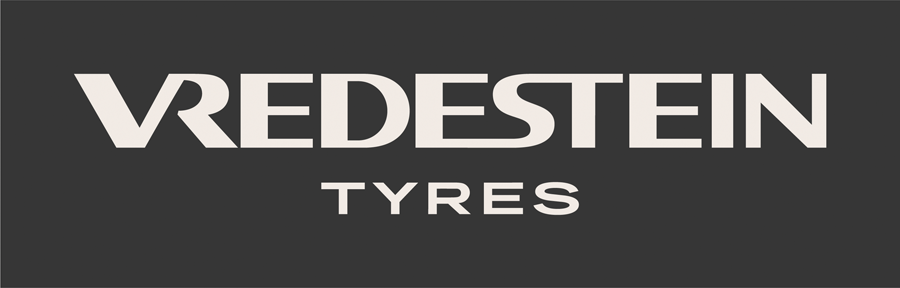
- Type: Subsidiary
- Industry: Tire
- Founded: 1909 in Delft, Netherlands
- Founder: Emile Louis Constant Schiff
- Headquarters: Amsterdam, Netherlands
- Parent: Apollo Tyres
- Website: www.vredestein.com

Apollo Vredestein B.V. is a Netherlands-based tire manufacturer. Since 2009, it has been owned by the Indian tyre maker Apollo Tyres. Apollo Vredestein has its head office in Amsterdam, Netherlands, and its production facility in Enschede. It designs, manufactures, and sells tires under the Apollo and Vredestein brand names through offices in Europe and North America.

Vredestein products include car tires, tires for agricultural and industrial applications, and bicycle tires. A significant number of its car tires are designed by Italian design house, Giugiaro Design. The brand is over 100 years old.

== History ==
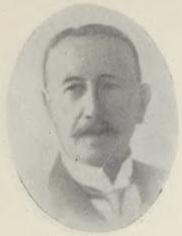
Emile Louis Constant Schiff

Emile Louis Constant Schiff became the owner of the Nederlandse Guttapercha Maatschappij in Delft, the forerunner of Apollo Vredestein, on 6 November 1908.

=== Vredestein, 1909–2009 ===
In 1909, the company moved to Loosduinen and changed its name to N.V. Rubberfabriek Vredestein. The name Vredestein comes from the name of the farm Schiff bought in Loosduinen in 1909, where he first started making rubber. The company initially specialised in all kinds of rubber products, including shoe heels, tennis balls, floor coverings, boots, and indoor football balls.

On 13 September 1934 most of the factory in Loosduinen was lost in a fire. Reconstruction started immediately, and the bicycle tire factory in Doetinchem was established in the same year. In 1946, the NV Nederlandsch-Amerikaansche Autobanden-fabriek Vredestein was founded in Enschede, with American company B. F. Goodrich owning just over 20% of the shares. A year later, Schiff laid the cornerstone of the plant in Enschede.

The growth of the company accelerated in 1962 when it merged with N.V. Rubberfabrieken Hevea in Raalte. Under the influence of globalisation in the 1970s, the Vredestein brand increasingly came to focus on car, agricultural, industrial, and two-wheeler tires. The oil crisis prompted many mergers in the tire industry during these years. In 1971, the company became wholly owned by B.F. Goodrich. Soon after, Vredestein's products found their way to 125 countries. In 1976, the Dutch state took over 49% of the shares in Vredestein, 2% was obtained by the Stichting tot Voortzetting van Vredestein (Foundation for the Continuation of Vredestein) while the remaining 49% initially remained in the possession of B. F. Goodrich. The shares were later taken over by the Foundation for a symbolic sum.

In the early 1990s, the company was acquired from the state by three Dutch investors. A collaboration was established with Italian designer Giorgetto Giugiaro in the late 1990s.

=== Apollo Vredestein, since 2009 ===
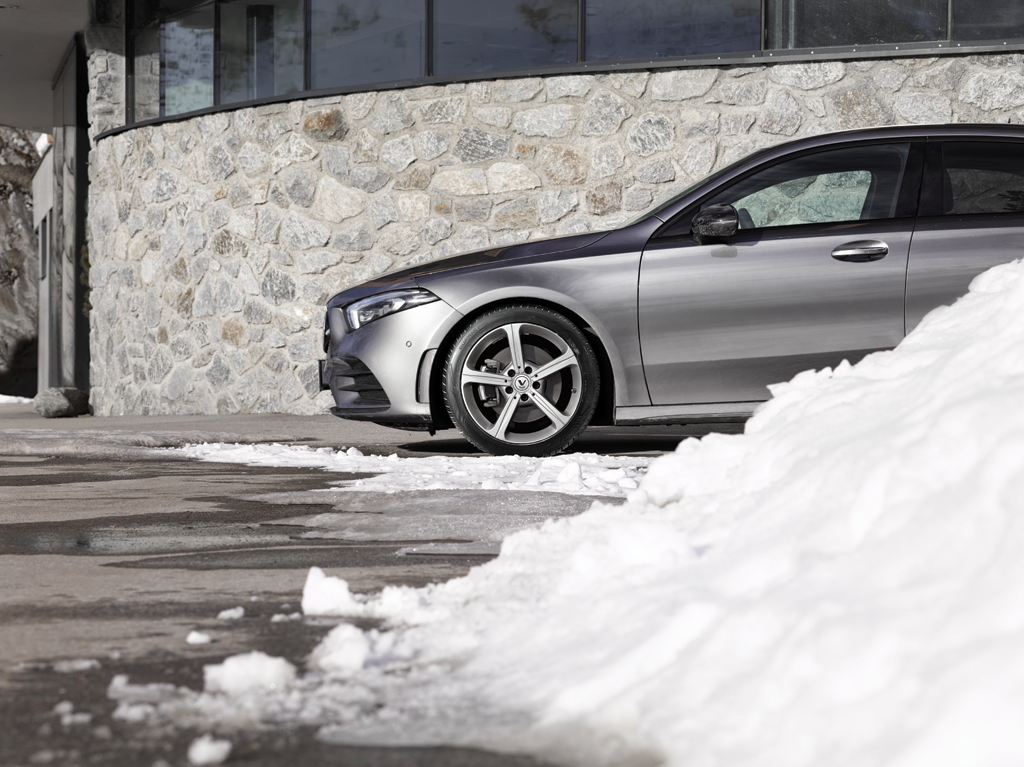
Quatrac Pro tyre by Vredestein

In 2009, Vredestein was acquired by India's Apollo Tyres, Ltd., and the company name was changed to Apollo Vredestein B.V. In January 2013, Apollo Tyres Ltd announced the opening of its global R&D center in Enschede, developing and testing car and van tires for the company. On 12 June 2013 Apollo Tyres Ltd announced the acquisition of Cooper Tire & Rubber Company in a US$2.5 billion deal. This would have turned Apollo Tyre into the world's seventh-largest tyre company, with combined global revenue of an estimated US$6.6 billion, according to Tire Review data, but on 30 December 2013, the Cooper acquisition was called off.

In May 2015, Apollo Tyres announced the relocation of its European head office from Enschede, to Amsterdam. The move happened in the following months. On 5 March 2020 the company announced that 750 jobs were to become redundant within 2 years. The intention is that the production of regular car tyres will be halted within that period.

== Structure ==
=== Offices ===
Apollo Vredestein B.V. is represented by:

- Netherlands: Apollo Vredestein B.V., Amsterdam
- Netherlands: Apollo Vredestein Nederland B.V., Enschede
- Germany: Apollo Vredestein GmbH, Vallendar
- Belgium: N.V. Apollo Vredestein BeLux S.A., Bruxelles
- France: Apollo Vredestein France S.A. Paris
- Austria: Apollo Vredestein Ges. m.b.H., Wenen
- Switzerland: Apollo Vredestein Schweiz AG, Baden
- Italy: Apollo Vredestein Italia S.R.L., Rimini
- United Kingdom: Apollo Vredestein (UK) Ltd, Kettering
- Spain: Apollo Vredestein Iberica S.A. Cityparc. Edificio Bruselas. Barcelona
- Sweden: Apollo Vredestein Däck AB, Hisings Backa (SW), Apollo Vredestein Norge A/S, Hisings Backa (NW)
- United States: Apollo Vredestein Tire Inc., Atlanta, GA
- Hungary: Apollo Vredestein Kft. Budapest
- Poland: Apollo Vredestein Polska Sp. z o.o. Warszawa
- Other countries: Apollo Vredestein Export, Enschede

=== Management ===
- Onkar S. Kanwar, chairman, Apollo Tyres Ltd
- Neeraj Kanwar, vice chairman and managing director, Apollo Tyres Ltd
- Benoit Rivallant, CEO, Apollo Vredestein B.V.
