= K. P. Noorudeen =

Indian politician from Kerala

K.P Noorudeen
- നൂറുദ്ദീന്‍

Personal details
- Born: 30 July 1939
- Died: 29 May 2016 (aged 76) Kozhikode
- Spouse: Asma
- Children: 4

K. P. Noorudeen (30 July 1939 – 29 May 2016) was an Indian Minister of Kerala State and a member of Indian National Congress.

== Biography ==
He started his political career through the Indian Youth Congress and raised to high positions of the party and was elected successfully to the Kerala Legislative Assembly from Peravoor Constituency in 1977, 80, 82, 87, and 91 General Elections. He served as the Minister with portfolios of Forest, Sports, Animal Husbandry in K.Karunakaran's Cabinet.

Noorudheen was undergoing treatment after he suffered a fall. Later, he was shifted to ICU following a cerebral hemorrhage and his condition took a turn for the worse. On Sunday 29 May 2016 he died at the age of 76.
