= K. J. George (Kerala politician) =

Indian politician (1934–2020)

Kunjappu Joseph George (1934 – 20 March 2020) was an Indian politician. He joined the Indian National Congress in 1955, and remained active in Indian National Congress (Organisation) until its merger into the Janata Party. George was elected to the Kerala Legislative Assembly for the first time in 1977 under the Janata Party banner. During his first term as a legislator, George represented Thrissur. He contested the Chalakudy seat in the 1982 and 1987 legislative assembly elections, and won both. George retired from politics in 2011, and died on 20 March 2020, aged 85.
