= C. S. Gangadharan =

Indian politician

C. S. Ganghadharan
- Born: 7 October 1927
- Died: 8 April 2007 (aged 79)
- Other names: Indian
- Occupations: Activist, politician

C.S. Gangadharan (7 October 1927 - 8 April 2007) was an Indian freedom fighter, a Keralan member of the legislative assembly (MLA) and state president of the Kerala Freedom Fighters Association. He was a prominent leader of the Kerala Socialist Party (KSP).

== Early days ==
During his university days, Gangadharan participated in the Indian independence movement. He was an activist of the Praja Mandalam and also of the erstwhile Vidyarthi Congress. He was a leader of the student movement. On one occasion, Gangadharan was not given permission to appear for intermediate examinations because he wore khadi, viewed as an anti-British statement.

== Political activity ==
He participated in the Quit India movement. After leaving college in 1947 Gangadharan formed the Kerala Socialist Party (KSP) under the leadership of Mathai Manjooran, whom he considered as his mentor and guide. Gangadharan led an agitation to Viyyur jail, when Manjooran was held. Assaulted by police and jailed himself, he was released from prison a day before India became independent.

C.S Gangadharan, known as CS to his friends, was a staunch activist for the KSP in the post-independence era. He served as secretary of the KSP as well as the publisher of Socialist, its weekly organ. He contested elections in 1970 with the support of the Communist Party of India (Marxist) and was elected to the Kerala Legislative Assembly representing the Irinjalakuda constituency.

== Personal life ==
In 1952, he married Vijayalakshmi, granddaughter of Chief Secretary of Cochin State Komattil Achutha Menon. Considering the caste-communal divide prevalent in society in those days, Gangadharan saw their inter-caste marriage as a revolutionary move. They have two sons and four daughters.

== Positions held ==
- Publisher :

- Health (Magazine)
- Socialist, the weekly organ of KSP.

- Secretary and president, Trichur Motor Thozhilai Co-operative Society
- Secretary and president, Kerala State Freedom Fighters Association
