= Communist Party of India (Marxist) – Kerala =

Communist Party of India (Marxist), Kerala
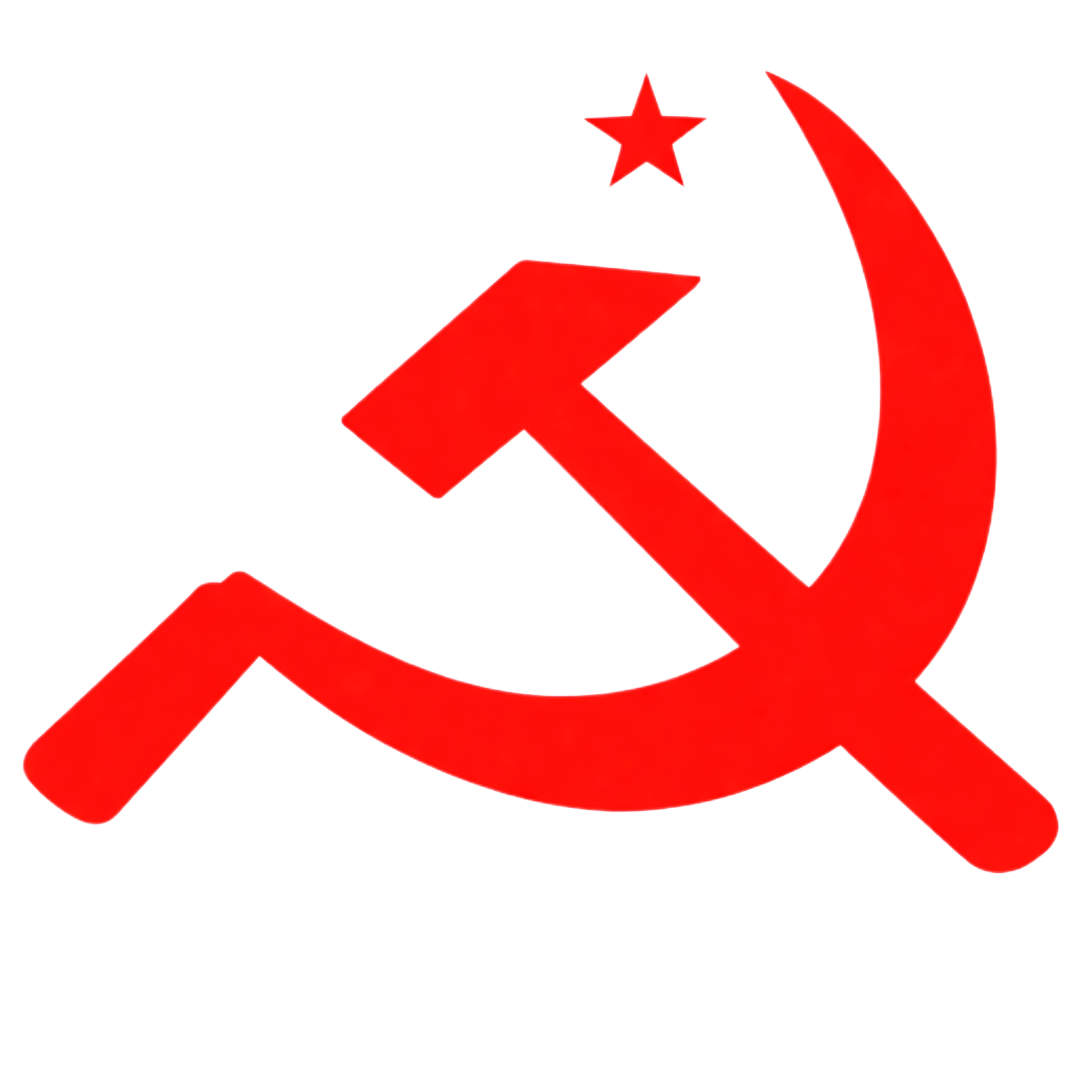
- Secretary: M. V. Govindan
- Headquarters: A. K. G. Centre, Thiruvananthapuram
- Newspaper: Deshabhimani
- Student wing: Students Federation (SFI Kerala)
- Youth wing: Democratic Youth Federation (DYFI Kerala)
- Women's wing: Democratic Women's Association (AIDWA Kerala)
- Labour wing: Centre of Indian Trade Unions (CITU Kerala)
- Membership: ▲527,174 (2022)
- Ideology: Communism; Marxism-Leninism; Socialism
- Political position: Left-wing
- Alliance: Left Democratic Front (Kerala)
- Seats in Rajya Sabha: 3 / 9 (Kerala)
- Seats in Lok Sabha: 1 / 20 (Kerala)
- Seats in Kerala Legislative Assembly: 26 / 140

Election symbol
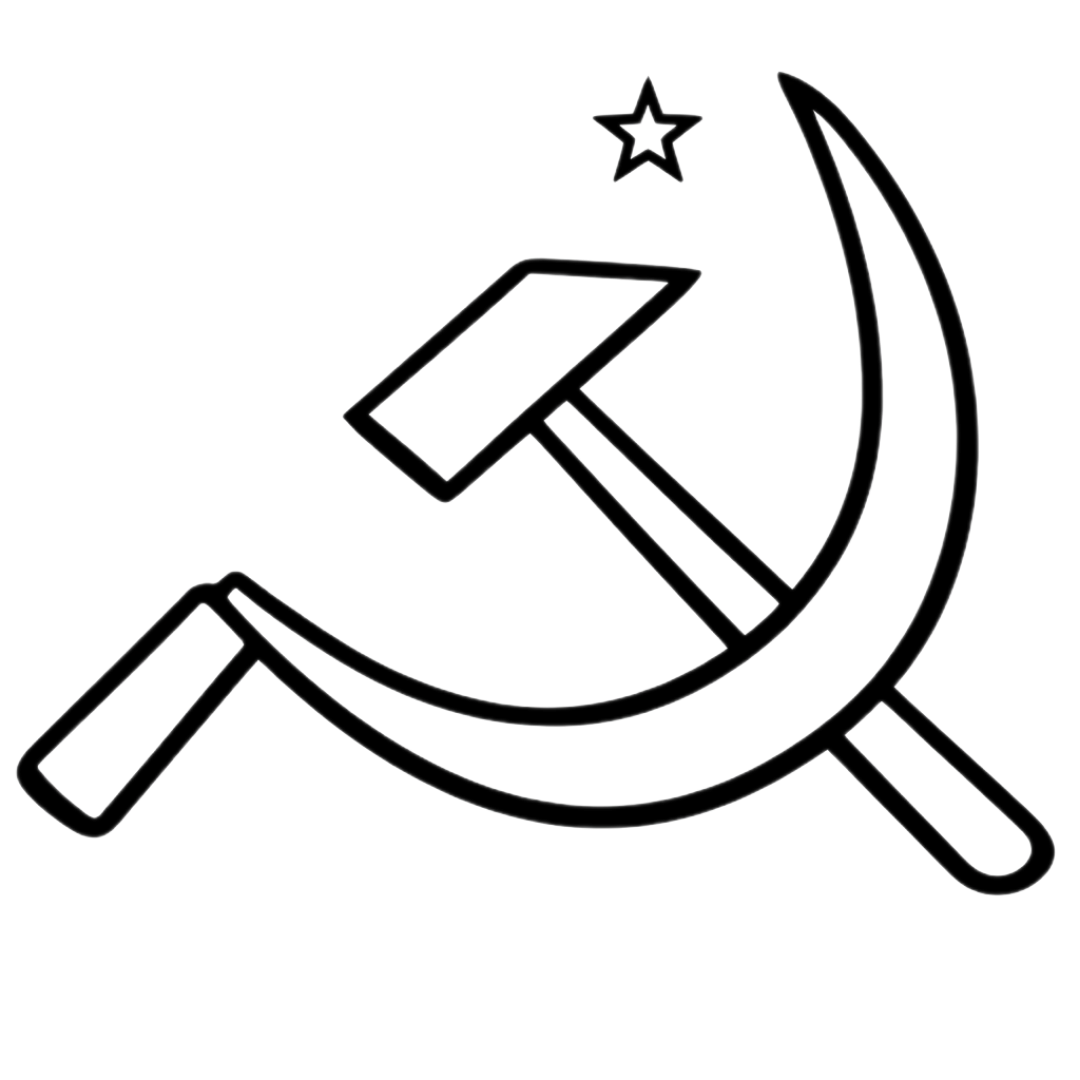

Party flag

Website
- cpimkerala.org

The Communist Party of India (Marxist), Kerala or CPI(M) Kerala is the Kerala state wing of CPI(M). It is responsible for organizing and coordinating the party's activities and campaigns within the state, as well as selecting candidates for local, state, and national elections. Currently, it is the opposition party in the Kerala Legislative Assembly and has significant representation of the state in the Rajya Sabha. The CPI(M) currently leads the LDF alliance.

== History ==
=== Background ===
In July 1937, a clandestine meeting was held at Calicut. Five persons were present at the meeting, P. Krishna Pillai, K. Damodaran, E.M.S. Namboodiripad, N. C. Sekhar and S.V. Ghate. The first four were members of the Congress Socialist Party (CSP) in Kerala. In that meeting, they founded the first cell of the CPI in Kerala. A wider conference could be conducted at Parappram, Pinarayi in December 1939 where the entire Kerala unit of the Congress Socialist Party got converted into a unit of the CPI. Thus, the proper functioning of the Communist Party of India in Kerala as a mass party started on 31 December 1939 with the Pinarayi Conference.

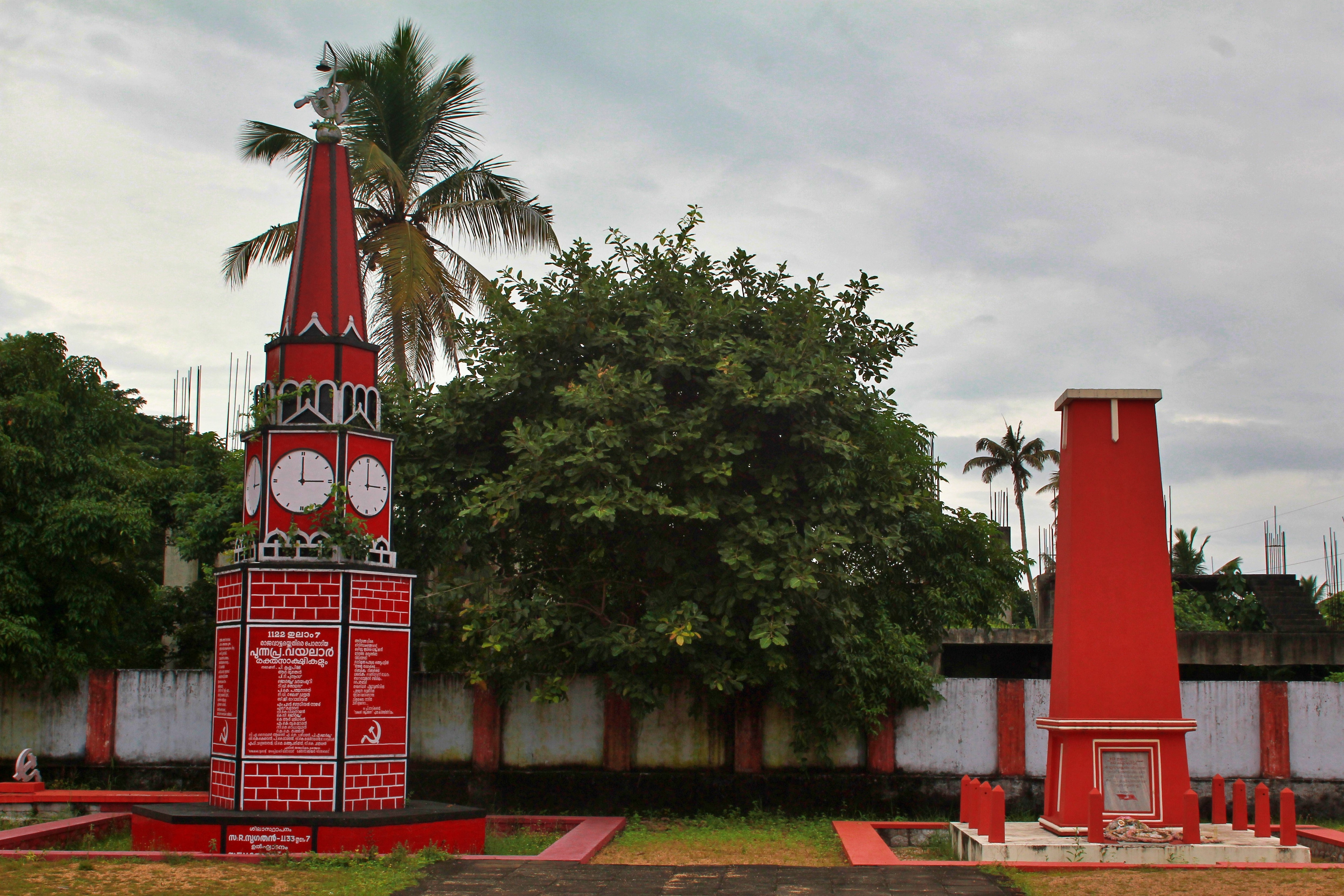
Punnapra-Vayalar uprising martyrs memorial at Vayalar

In 1946, Punnapra-Vayalar uprising was a mass communist movement against C. P. Ramaswami Iyer, the Diwan (Head) of Travancore in Alappuzha. The revolt was due to over 21,000 peasants died in Cherthala taluk alone during the Famine (1939–43). This led to a war between the Travancore police and people. Over 400 people were killed. After the killings, many people around the areas turned into communists.

In 1957 Kerala Assembly election the Communist Party of India (CPI) was elected to rule the state government of Kerala under E. M. S. Namboodiripad only to have the government dismissed and President's Rule declared in 1959 following the Vimochana Samaram. In 1964, in conjunction with the widening rift between China and the Soviet Union, a large leftist faction of the CPI leadership, based predominantly in Kerala and West Bengal, split from the party to form the Communist Party of India (Marxist), or CPI (M). In Kerala, the CPI (M) in coalition with other parties wrested control from the Congress and its allies (frequently including the CPI) in 1967, in 1980, and in 1987. Support for the CPI (M) in Kerala in general elections has ranged from 19 percent to 26 percent, but the party has never won more than nine of Kerala's twenty seats in Parliament.

=== Formation of CPI(M) in Kerala ===
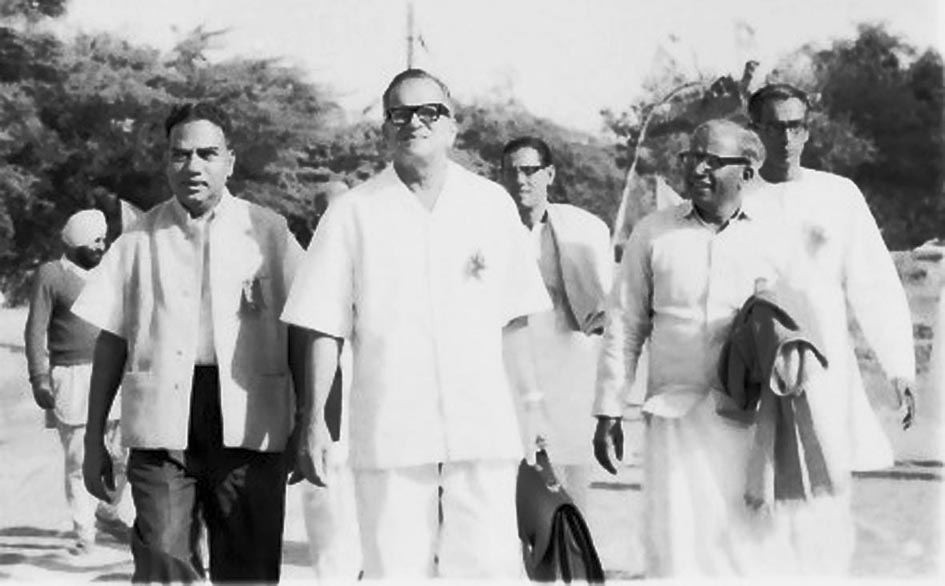
A. K. Gopalan (left) and E.M.S. Namboodiripad (right) with other CPI(M) leaders in Kolkata, 1966.

After the CPI split in 1964, prominent communist leaders in Kerala E.M.S. Namboodiripad, A. K. Gopalan and K. R. Gouri Amma stood with the Communist Party of India (Marxist). One year after the split, in the 1965 elections CPI(M) which was a splinter faction of CPI, emerged as the largest party in the assembly with 40 seats, while CPI could win only 3 seats. However no single party could form a ministry commanding majority and hence this election is considered abortive. President's rule was invoked for the fourth time.

In the 1967 Kerala assembly election both communist parties - CPI (M) and CPI - along with smaller parties including SSP and Muslim League contested this election as a United Front. A total of seven parties contested in the front, and the front was known as Saptakakshi Munnani. The CPI(M) led front won the election with a record 113 seats out of 133 seats and formed the government under E.M.S. Namboodiripad. After 2 years of the government, due to continuous problems between CPI and CPI(M) many ministers from the smaller parties resigned eventually, and many parties subsequently left the front owing to the loss of majority the Second Namboodiripad ministry was dissolved in 1969.

=== Emergency rule in Kerala ===
During the emergency rule, when communists in Kerala were organising the political activities from different hide-outs, many CPI(M) members and leaders including former chief minister of Kerala Pinarayi Vijayan was imprisoned for one and a half years. He was arrested and tortured by police. After his release, Pinarayi Vijayan reached the Kerala Legislative Assembly and made an impassionate speech against senior Congress leader K. Karunakaran holding up the blood-stained shirt he wore when in police custody, causing serious embarrassment to the then C. Achutha Menon government. Hundreds of Communists, whether from the CPI(M), other Marxist parties, or the Naxalites, were arrested during the Emergency. Some were tortured or, as in the case of the Kerala student P. Rajan, killed.

=== Formation of Left Democratic Front alliance ===
In the late 1970s and early 1980s, two main pre-poll political alliances were formed: the Left Democratic Front (LDF), led by the Communist Party of India (Marxist) and Communist Party of India and the United Democratic Front (UDF), led by the Indian National Congress.

=== Nayanar Era (1980 - 2001) ===
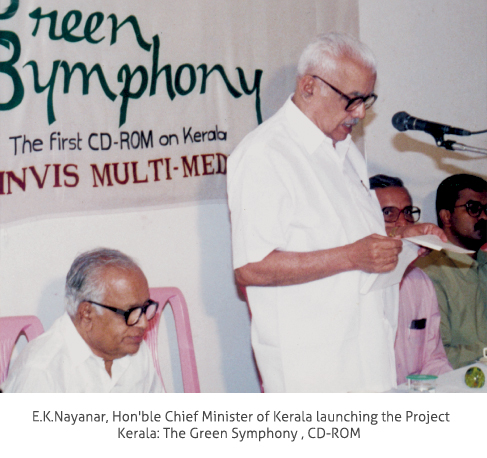
E. K. Nayanar in 1998.

Since the formation of the alliance in 1980, E. K. Nayanar has led the party and alliance for two decades and has also become the longest-served Chief Minister of Kerala. The CPI(M) led alliance has won every alternate election in 1980 election, 1987 election and 1996 election since the formation led by Nayanar. In this period Kerala saw several progressive reforms, especially in the Land Reforms and Labour Welfare sectors. The Kerala Coir workers Welfare Fund Act, 1987, The Kerala Khadi Workers’ Welfare Fund Act, 1989, The Kerala Abkari Workers Welfare Fund Act, 1989, The Kerala Construction workers’ Welfare Fund Act, 1989 and the Kerala Ration Dealer's Welfare Fund Act 1998.

== Timeline ==
- 1925 - Workers and Peasants Party formed which later helped to form Communist Party of India.
- 1925 - Communist Party of India founded in Kanpur on 26 December 1925.
- 1931 - Communist League formed for propaganda for organising a trade union in Trivandrum, Kerala, in 1931
- 1934 - Formation of Congress Socialist Party (CSP) in Kerala, as part of the Popular Front strategy of the ComIntern.
- 1935 - All India member of Communist Party of India, P. Sundarayya met members of CSP Kerala unit leaders P. Krishna Pillai and E.M.S. Namboodiripad in Madras.
- 1937 - A meeting was held in Calicut between P. Krishna Pillai, E.M.S. Namboodiripad, A. K. Gopalan, K. Damodaran, N. C. Sekhar and S.V. Ghate whom were members of Congress Socialist Party (CSP)
- 1939-40 - Split in Congress. Communist Party of India walked away with the entire Kerala Congress unit.
- 1940 - Formation of Communist Party of India in Kerala
- 1946 - Punnapra-Vayalar Revolt, was a mass communist movement against C. P. Ramaswami Iyer, the Diwan (Head) of Travancore
- 1947 - India gains independence from British Raj.
- 1952 - In the 1952 Travancore-Cochin Legislative Assembly election, Communist Party of India was banned to contest election.
- 1956 - Kerala state was formed comprising South Canara (Kasaragod region), Malabar, Cochin, and Travancore.
- 1957 - First Kerala Legislative assembly election was held in Kerala, the election led to the formation of first democratically elected communist government in India and first state to elect a Non-Congress party in the country. E.M.S. Namboodiripad sworn in as first chief minister of Kerala.
- 1959 - Dismissal of government following Liberation Struggle.
- 1963 - Split in leadership of Communist Party of India (CPI).
- 1964 - Formation of Communist Party of India (Marxist) (CPI(M)).
- 1967 - CPI(M) led United Front Alliance won the Forth Kerala Legislative assembly election with over 113 of 133 seats. The alliance included CPI and Muslim League.
- 1980 - Formation of CPI(M) led Left Democratic Front (LDF) alliance.

=== Recent State Conferences and major events ===
- 1985 Ernakulam conference - alternative document and ouster of M. V. Raghavan
- 1988 Alappuzha conference - V. S. Achuthanandan re-elected as state secretary
- 1991 Kozhikode conference - V. S. Achuthanandan loses to E. K. Nayanar by 2 votes
- 1995 Kollam conference - downslide to VS faction
- 1998 Palakkad conference - comeback of VS and ouster of CITU lobby including M. M. Lawrence, V. B. Cheriyan, K. N. Raveendranath, Appukkutan Vallikunnu
- 2002 Kannur conference - start of the VS vs PV feud that shall continue until VS's retirement from active politics after 2015
- 2005 Malappuram conference
- 2008 Kottayam conference - paramountcy of PV faction
- 2012 Thiruvananthapuram conference
- 2015 Alappuzha conference - VS walks out

== Structure and composition ==
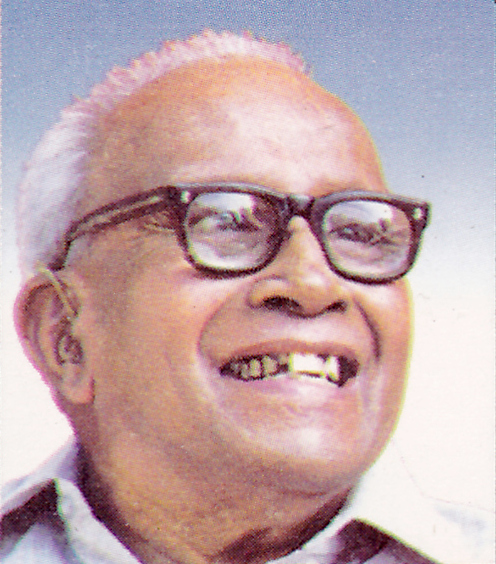
E. M. S. Namboodiripad
1st chief minister of Kerala and 1st from CPI(M)

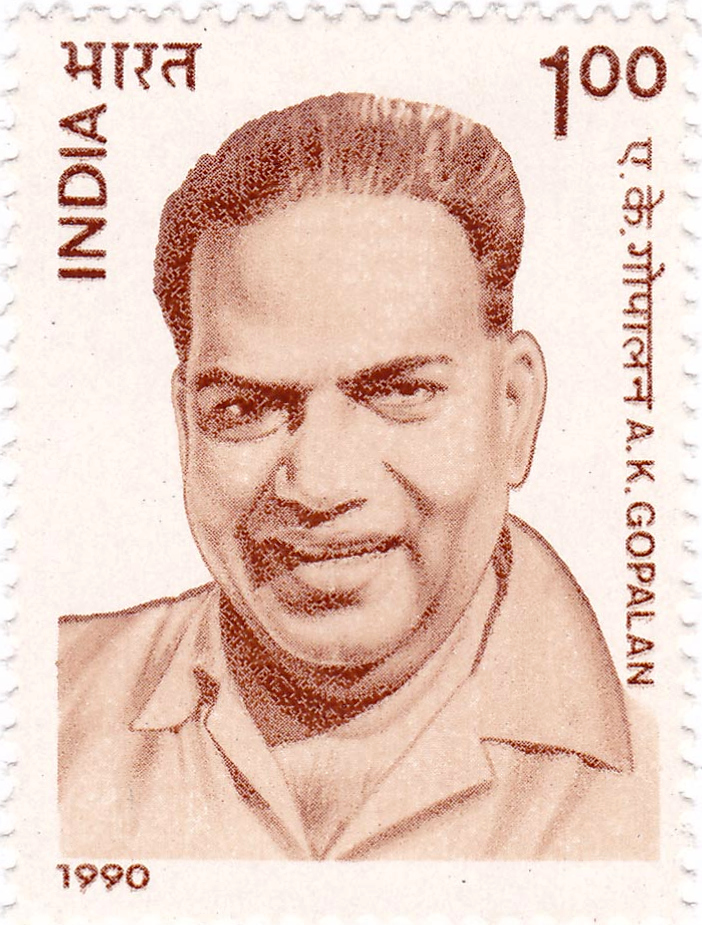
A. K. Gopalan
Founding member of Communist Party of India (Marxist) from Kerala

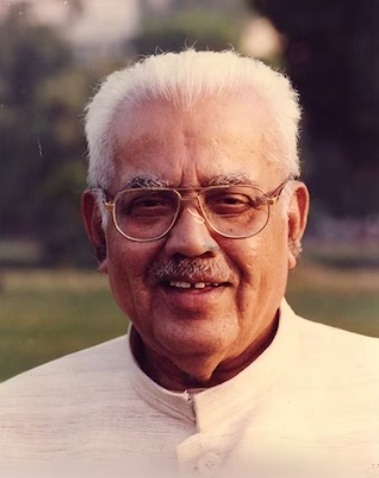
E. K. Nayanar
Longest serving Chief minister of Kerala

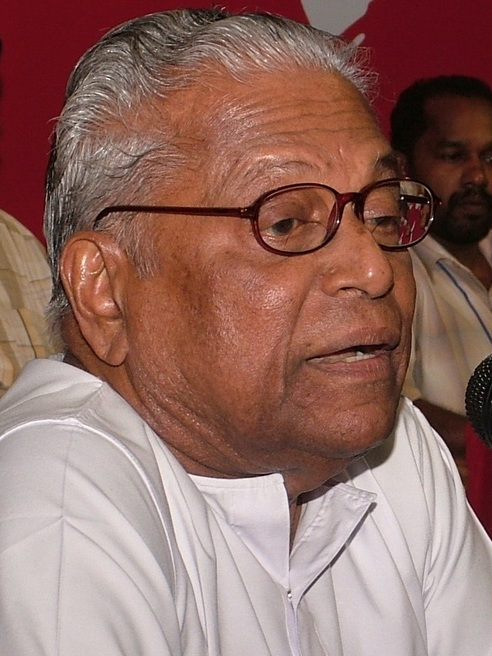
V. S. Achuthanandan
10th chief minister of Kerala and has also served as the longest served Leader of the Opposition for 15 years.

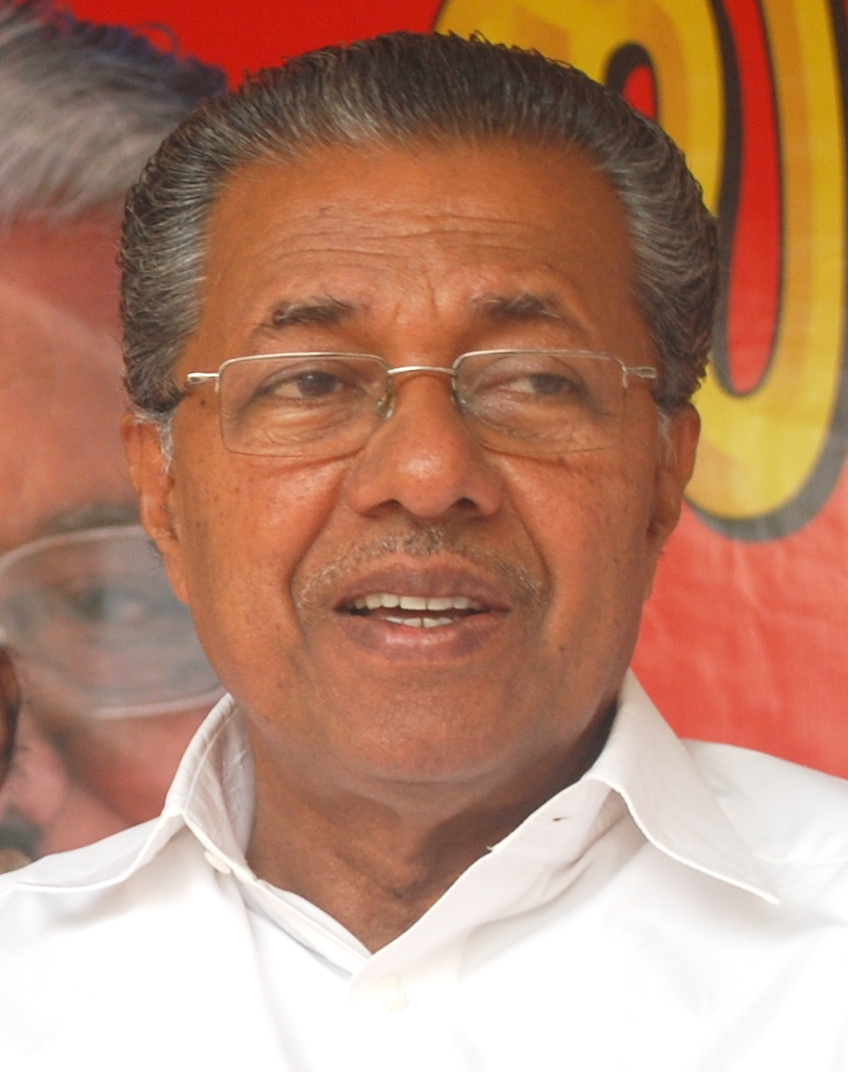
Pinarayi Vijayan
Longest serving state secretary and former Chief minister of Kerala

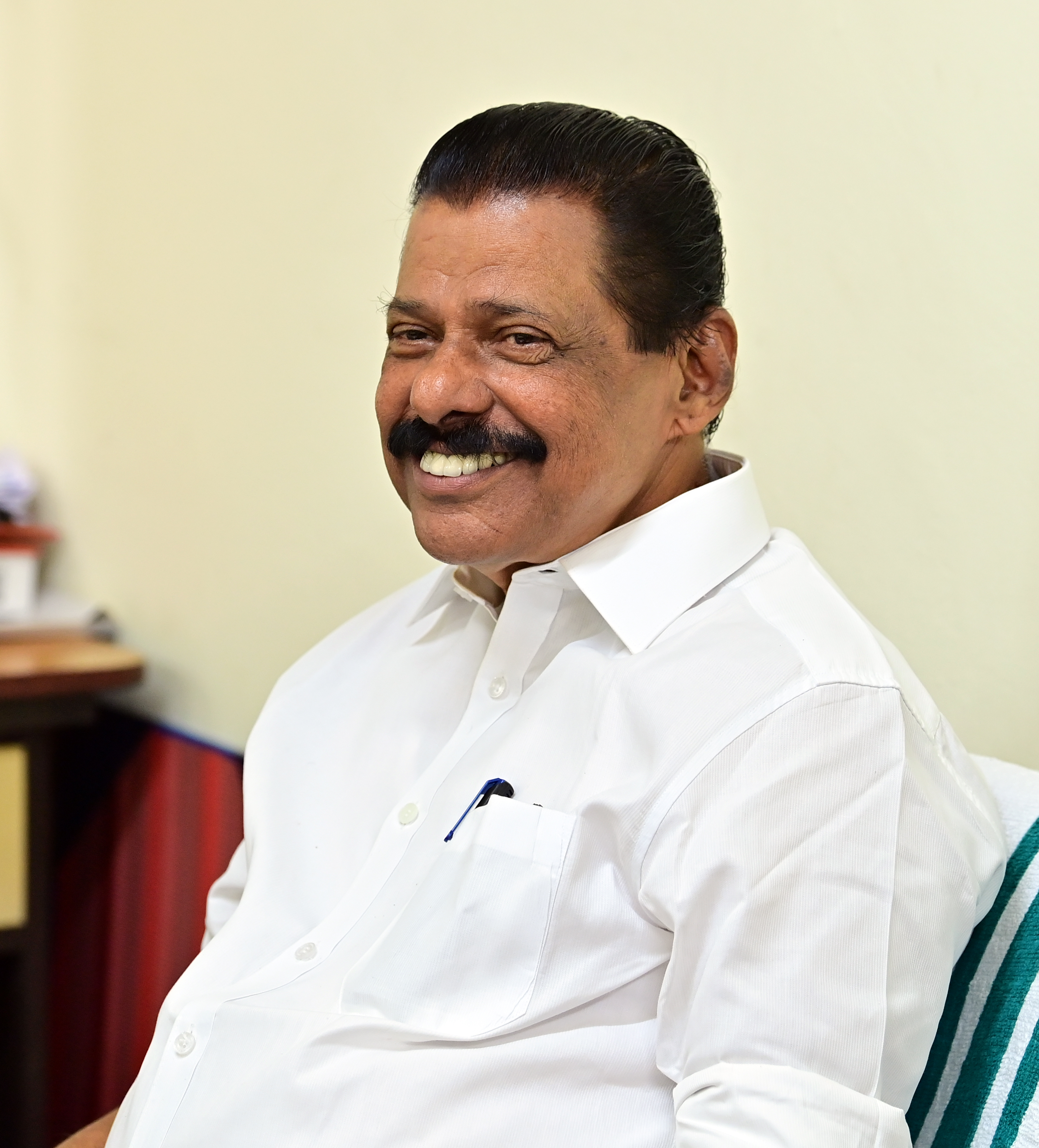
M. V. Govindan
Current State Secretary of CPI(M) in Kerala

=== List of state secretaries of CPI(M) Kerala ===
No.	Portrait	Secretary (Birth–Death)	Term	Total Years as secretary
1		C. H. Kanaran (1909–1972)	1964–1972	8 Years
2		E. K. Nayanar (1919–2004)	1972–1980	8 Years
3		V. S. Achuthanandan (1923–2025)	1980–1992	12 Years
4		E. K. Nayanar (1919–2004)	1992–1996	4 Years
5		Chadayan Govindan (1929–1998)	1996-1998	2 Years
6		Pinarayi Vijayan (1945–)	25 September 1998 – 23 February 2015	17 Years
7		Kodiyeri Balakrishnan (1953–2022)	23 February 2015 – 28 August 2022	7 Years
8		M. V. Govindan (1953–)	31 August 2022–present	Incumbent

=== List of Polit Bureau members from CPI(M) Kerala ===
No.	Portrait	Name	Period
1		E. M. S. Namboodiripad	1964 - 1998
2		A. K. Gopalan	1964 - 1977
3		E. Balanandan	1978 - 2005
4		V. S. Achuthanandan	1986 - 2009
5		E. K. Nayanar	1992 - 2004
6		S. Ramachandran Pillai	1992 - 2022
7		Pinarayi Vijayan	1998–present
8		Kodiyeri Balakrishnan	2008 - 2022
9		M. A. Baby	2012–present
10		M. V. Govindan	2022–present
11		A. Vijayaraghavan	2022–present

=== Current State Secretariat Leaders ===
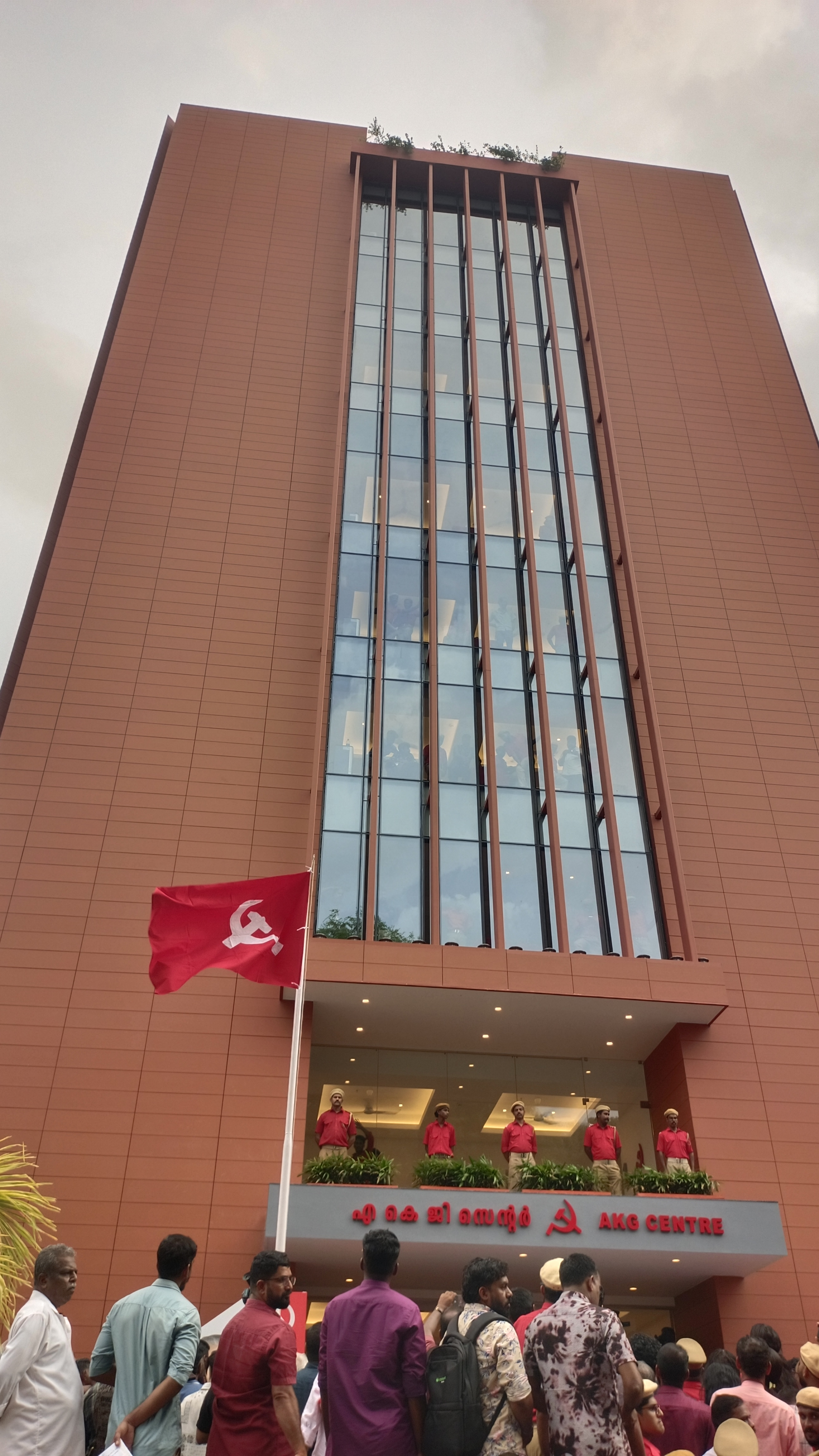
Headquarters of CPI(M)-Kerala, New AKG Centre building

No.	Leader's name	Born (Age)
1	Pinarayi Vijayan	24 May 1945 (age 81)
2	E. P. Jayarajan	28 May 1950 (age 76)
3	P. Jayarajan	27 November 1952 (age 73)
4	M. V. Govindan	23 April 1953 (age 73)
5	V. N. Vasavan	3 March 1954 (age 72)
6	V. Sivankutty	10 November 1954 (age 72)
7	K. K. Shailaja	20 November 1956 (age 70)
8	M. V. Jayarajan	24 May 1960 (age 66)
9	K. N. Balagopal	28 July 1963 (age 63)
10	Saji Cherian	28 May 1965 (age 61)
11	P. Rajeeve	13 May 1968 (age 58)
12	M.B. Rajesh	12 March 1971 (age 55)
13	P. K. Biju	3 April 1974 (age 52)
14	P. A. Mohammed Riyas	18 May 1976 (age 50)
15	C. N. Mohanan	
16	M. Swaraj	27 May 1979 (age 47)

=== Principal mass organisations ===
No.	Organisation Name	Association for	President
1	Democratic Youth Federation of India (DYFI)	Youth	V. Vaseef
2	Students' Federation of India (SFI)	Students	M Shivaprasad
3	Centre of Indian Trade Unions (CITU)	Trade union	Elamaram Kareem
4	All India Democratic Women's Association (AIDWA)	Women	P. K. Sreemathy
5	Balasangham	Children	Pravisha Pramod
6	Bank Employees Federation of India (BEFI)	Bank	C. J. Nandakumar
7	Adivasi Kshema Samithi (AKS)	Tribal	K. C. Kunhiraman
8	All India Agricultural Workers Union	Agricultural Workers	A. Vijayaraghavan
9	All India Kisan Sabha	Farmers	Valsan Panoli
10	Coffee Farmers’ Federation of India	Coffee Farmers	M. M. Mani
11	Purogama Kalasahitya Sangham	Writers and Artists	Shaji N. Karun
12	Kerala NGO Union (NGOU)	Non Gazetted Officers	M. V. Sashidharan
12	Kerala Gazetted Officers' Association (KGOA)	Gazetted Officers	Dr. M. A. Nazer
13	Association of Kerala Govt. College Teachers (AKGCT)	Govt. College Teachers	Prof. (Dr.) Manoj N.
14	All Kerala Private College Teachers' Association (AKPCT)	Private College Teachers' Association	Nisanth A
15	Kerala School Teachers Association (KSTA)	School Teachers	

=== District Secretaries ===
No.	District	District Secretary
1	Thiruvananthapuram	V. Joy
2	Kollam	S.Sudevan
3	Alappuzha	R. Naser
4	Pathanamthitta	Raju Abraham
5	Kottayam	A. V. Rasal
6	Idukki	C.V. Varghese
7	Ernakulam	S. Satheesh
8	Thrissur	M. M. Varghese
9	Palakkad	E.N. Suresh Babu
10	Malappuram	V.P. Anil
11	Kozhikode	M. Mehabub
12	Wayanad	Rafeeq
13	Kannur	M. V. Jayarajan
14	Kasaragod	M. Rajagopalan

== List of Chief Ministers from CPI(M) ==
No.	Portrait	Name Ministry (Year)	Length of term	
No.	Portrait	Name Ministry (Year)	Longest continuous term	Total years of premiership
1		E. M. S. Namboodiripad; 1st Namboodiripad (1957–1959); 2nd Namboodiripad (1967–1969)	2 years, 240 days	4 years 357 days
2		E. K. Nayanar; 1st Nayanar (1980–1981); 2nd Nayanar (1987–1991); 3rd Nayanar (1996–2001)	5 years, 27 days	11 years, 10 days
3		V. S. Achuthanandan; Achuthanandan (2006–2011)	4 years, 364 days	4 years, 364 days
4		Pinarayi Vijayan; 1st Pinarayi (2016–2021); 2nd Pinarayi (2021–2026)	9 years, 358 days	9 years, 358 days

== Kerala Assembly election results ==
Kerala Assembly Election Results
Year	Party leader	Overall votes	% of overall votes	Total seats	seats won/ seats contensted	Change in seats	Outcome
As Communist Party of India
1957	E. M. S. Namboodiripad	2,059,547	35.28%	126	60 / 101	▲ new	Government
1960	E. M. S. Namboodiripad	3,171,732	39.14%	126	29 / 108	▼20	Opposition
As Communist Party of India (Marxist)
1965	E. M. S. Namboodiripad	1,257,869	19.87%	133	40 / 73	▲ new	No Result
1967	E. M. S. Namboodiripad	1,476,456	23.51%	133	52 / 59	▲12	Government
1970	E. M. S. Namboodiripad	N/A	N/A	133	29 / 70	▼23	Opposition
1977	E. M. S. Namboodiripad	1,946,051	22.2 %	140	17 / 68	▼12	Opposition
1980	E. K. Nayanar	1,846,312	19.4%	140	35 / 50	▲18	Government
1982	E. K. Nayanar	1,798,198	18.8%	140	28 / 51	▼7	Opposition
1987	E. K. Nayanar	2,912,999	22.8 %	140	38 / 70	▲10	Government
1991	E. K. Nayanar	3,129,523	22.1 %	140	28 / 65	▼10	Opposition
1996	V. S. Achuthanandan	3,078,723	21.6 %	140	40 / 62	▲12	Government
2001	V. S. Achuthanandan	3,361,827	21.4 %	140	24 / 65	▼16	Opposition
2006	V. S. Achuthanandan	4,732,381	30.4 %	140	61 / 85	▲37	Government
2011	V. S. Achuthanandan	4,921,354	28.2 %	140	44 / 84	▼17	Opposition
2016	Pinarayi Vijayan	5,365,472	26.7 %	140	58 / 84	▲14	Government
2021	Pinarayi Vijayan	5,288,502	25.5 %	140	62 / 75	▲4	Government
2026	Pinarayi Vijayan	4,700,662	21.8 %	140	26 / 77	▼36	Opposition

Communist Party of India (Marxist) seat count in Kerala Legislative Assembly

== List of CPIM Members of 16th Kerala Legislative Assembly (2026) ==
District (Total Seats)	Constituency	Name
Kasaragod (5)	No representation	
Kannur (10)	Kalliasseri	M. Vijin
Kannur (10)	Azhikode	K. V. Sumesh
Kannur (10)	Dharmadom	Pinarayi Vijayan
Kannur (10)	Thalassery	Karayi Rajan
Kannur (10)	Mattanur	V. K. Sanoj
Wayanad (3)	No representation	
Kozhikode (13)	Beypore	P. A. Mohammed Riyas
Palakkad (12)	Shornur	P. Mammikutty
Palakkad (12)	Ottapalam	K. Premkumar
Palakkad (12)	Malampuzha	A. Prabhakaran
Palakkad (12)	Tarur	P. P. Sumod
Palakkad (12)	Nenmara	K. Preman
Palakkad (12)	Alathur	T. M. Sasi
Malappuram (16)	No representation	
Thrissur (13)	Chelakkara	U. R. Pradeep
Thrissur (13)	Kunnamkulam	A. C. Moideen
Thrissur (13)	Guruvayur	N. K. Akbar
Thrissur (13)	Manalur	C. Raveendranath
Thrissur (13)	Wadakkanchery	Xavier Chittilappilly
Thrissur (13)	Puthukkad	K. K. Ramachandran
Ernakulam (14)	No representation	
Idukki (5)	No representation	
Kottayam (9)	No representation	
Alappuzha (9)	Mavelikara	M. S. Arun Kumar
Alappuzha (9)	Chengannur	Saji Cherian
Pathanamthitta (5)	Konni	K. U. Jenish Kumar
Kollam (11)	Kottarakkara	K. N. Balagopal
Thiruvananthapuram (14)	Varkala	V. Joy
Thiruvananthapuram (14)	Attingal	O. S. Ambika
Thiruvananthapuram (14)	Aruvikkara	G. Steephen
Thiruvananthapuram (14)	Parassala	C. K. Hareendran

== Loksabha election results of CPI (M) in Kerala ==
Performance of Communist Party of India (Marxist), Kerala in Loksabha elections
Year	Legislature	Party State Secretary	Total constituencies	Seats won / contested	Change in seats	Total votes	Per. of votes	Change in vote %	Ref.
1967	4th Lok Sabha	C. H. Kanaran	19	9 / 9	New	1,540,027	24.6 %	New	
1971	5th Lok Sabha	C. H. Kanaran	19	2 / 11	▼7	1,711,442	26.2 %	▲1.60%	
1977	6th Lok Sabha	E. K. Nayanar	20	0 / 9	▼2	1,800,193	20.3 %	▼5.90%	
1980	7th Lok Sabha	E. K. Nayanar	20	7 / 8	▲7	1,754,387	21.5 %	▲1.20%	
1984	8th Lok Sabha	V. S. Achuthanandan	20	1 / 10	▼6	2,425,965	22.3 %	▲0.80%	
1989	9th Lok Sabha	V. S. Achuthanandan	20	2 / 10	▲1	3,411,227	22.9 %	▲0.70%	
1991	10th Lok Sabha	V. S. Achuthanandan	20	3 / 9	▲1	2,952,043	20.7 %	▼2.20%	
1996	11th Lok Sabha	Chadayan Govindan	20	5 / 9	▲2	3,044,369	21.2 %	▲0.50%	
1998	12th Lok Sabha	Pinarayi Vijayan	20	6 / 9	▲1	3,121,636	21.0 %	▼0.20%	
1999	13th Lok Sabha	Pinarayi Vijayan	20	8 / 12	▲2	4,290,986	27.9 %	▲6.90%	
2004	14th Lok Sabha	Pinarayi Vijayan	20	12 / 13	▲4	4,754,567	31.5 %	▲3.60%	
2009	15th Lok Sabha	Pinarayi Vijayan	20	4 / 14	▼8	4,887,333	30.5 %	▼1.00%	
2014	16th Lok Sabha	Pinarayi Vijayan	20	5 / 10	▲1	3,880,655	21.8 %	▼8.70%	
2019	17th Lok Sabha	Kodiyeri Balakrishnan	20	1 / 14	▼4	5,266,510	26.0 %	▲4.20%	
2024	18th Lok Sabha	M. V. Govindan	20	1 / 15	Steady	5,161,034	26.0 %	Steady	

=== Rajya Sabha ===
#	Name	Party	Term start	Term End
1	A. A. Rahim	CPI(M)	03-Apr-2022	03-Apr-2028
2	V. Sivadasan	CPI(M)	24-Apr-2021	23-Apr-2027
3	John Brittas	CPI(M)	24-Apr-2021	23-Apr-2027

=== Lok Sabha ===
#	Constituency	Name	Party
1	Alathur	K.Radhakrishnan	CPI(M)

== See also ==
- Politics in Kerala
- Left Democratic Front
- Communism in Kerala
- Communist Party of India (Marxist), Tripura
- Communist Party of India (Marxist), West Bengal
- Kerala Pradesh Congress Committee
- Communist Party of India (Marxist), Tamil Nadu
- Communist Party of India - Kerala
