= United Front (1967–1969, Kerala) =

Political alliance in Kerala, India

- 1967–1969
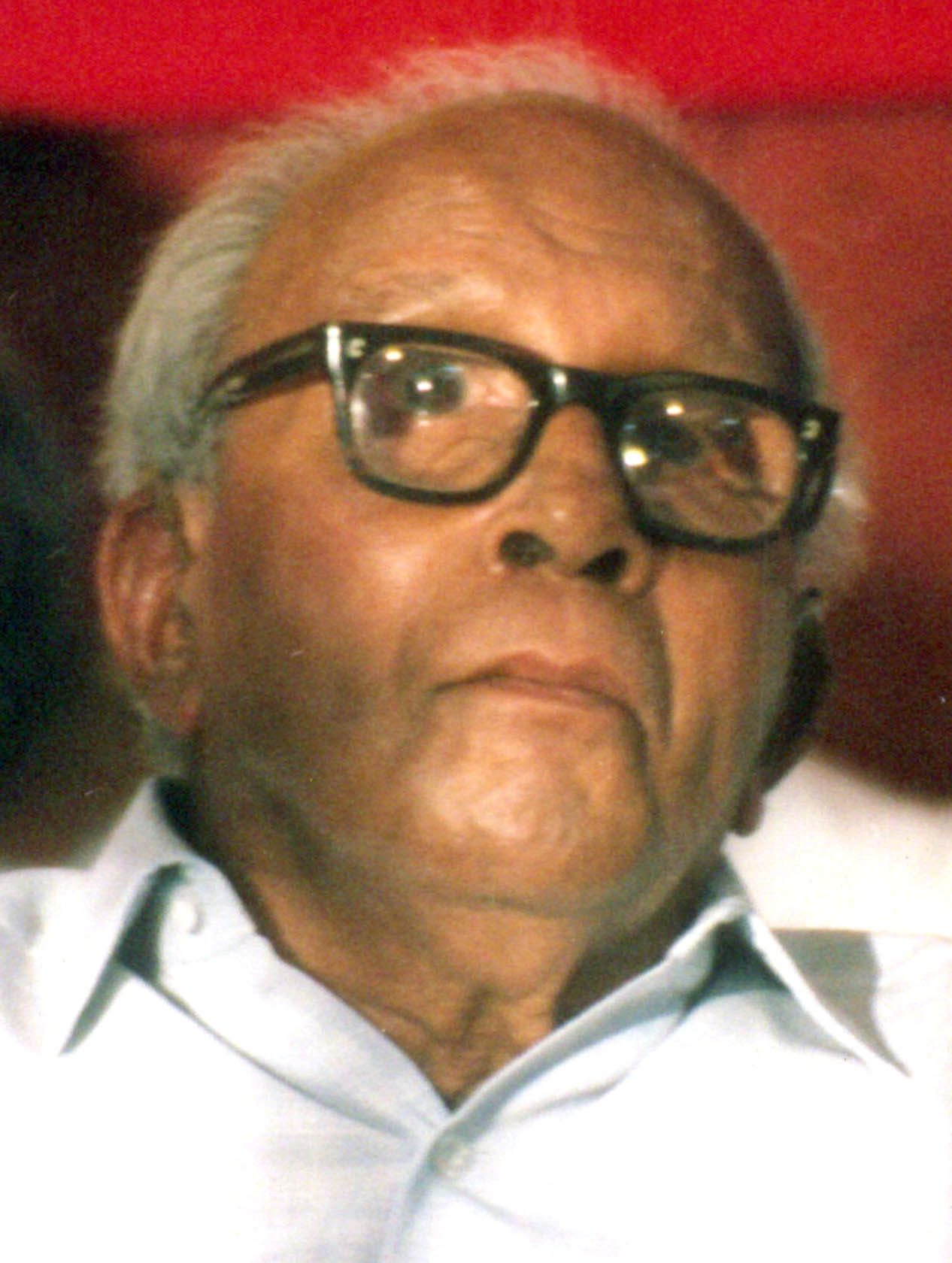
- E. M. S. Namboodiripad
- Date formed: 6 March 1967
- Date dissolved: 24 October 1969

People and organisations
- Governor: Bhagwan Sahay; V. Viswanathan
- Chief Minister: E. M. S. Namboodiripad
- Member parties: CPI-M; CPI; SSP; Muslim League; RSP; KTP; KSP
- Status in legislature: Majority (coalition) 117 / 133

History
- Election: Assembly Election, 1967
- Predecessor: R. Sankar ministry
- Successor: C. Achutha Menon ministry

United Front or the Seven Party Alliance (Malayalam: Saptha Kakshi Munnani) was an alliance of seven political parties in Kerala state, India, which won the 1967 Kerala Legislative Assembly election and formed the Second E. M. S. Namboodiripad ministry. It was led by the Communist Party of India Marxist (CPIM) and the members of the coalition were:

	1967		
	Seats won	Seats contested	%
Communist Party of India Marxist (CPIM)	52	59	23.51
Communist Party of India (CPI)	19	22	08.57
Samyukta Socialist Party (SSP)	19	21	08.40
Muslim League (MUL)	14	15	06.75
Revolutionary Socialist Party (RSP)	INDEPENDENTS		
Karshaka Thozhilali Party (KTP)	INDEPENDENTS		
Kerala Socialist Party (KSP)	INDEPENDENTS		

The coalition had a comfortable majority of 117 members out of 133 (including 4 independents). E. M. S. Namboodiripad (CPIM) was sworn in as the Chief Minister for the second time on 6 March 1967. But before completing 30 months, internal dissensions surfaced and the government fell 32 months after assuming power, on 24 October 1969.

== See also ==
- United Front (1970–1979, Kerala)
- Communist Party of India (Marxist), Kerala
