= Joseph Vadakkan =

Indian political activist

Fr. Joseph Vadakkan
- Born: 1 October 1919; Thrissur, British India
- Died: 28 December 2002 (aged 83); Thrissur, India
- Occupations: Catholic Priest, writer, Christian political activist
- Relatives: Tom Vadakkan
- Writing career
- Language: Malayalam

Fr. Joseph Vadakkan (1 October 1919 – 28 December 2002) was a Christian activist priest of Kerala in India, and the founder of the political party known as Karshaka Thozhilali Party (KTP). Vadakkan organised many agitations and took part in protest marches, satyagrahas, and rallies. He was also arrested and jailed. He was reprimanded by his own Church.

== Early life ==
Fr. Vadakkan was born at Thoyakkavu as the son of Kunjila and Ittikkuru of the Vadakkan house. Father Vadakkan worked as a school teacher before joining the seminary at age 26. While working as a young teacher, Joseph took part in the protest by organizing teachers. He was ordained a priest 11 years later. While still a seminarian, however, he launched a front in 1951 to fight the Communist Party of India that was then making inroads in Kerala.

== Later activities ==
The weekly Thozhilali (labourer) that he started later grew into a daily newspaper. When the Vimochana Samaram, an agitation against the first Communist ministry broke out in 1958, Vadakkan played a leading role. Father Vadakkan was one of the general secretaries who coordinated that struggle. He initiated a movement called Anti Communist Front (ACF). However, he allied with communists like the A. K. Gopalan in some other agitations. Later, he organised struggles for the cause of settler farmers in Kerala and founded the KTP with B. Wellington as president. He had also started other publications such as "Malayorasabdam" (voice from hills), "The Kerala Tempest" – to highlight the plight of farmers and workers.

Vadakkan's unconventional ways soon brought him into conflict with the Church. The Church disliked his alliance with the communists. In 1971, Father Vadakkan defied his bishop and conducted a public Holy Mass in Thekkinkadu Maidan, in Thrissur, which led to controversy. He was suspended from conducting mass for 8 years, but remained a priest. But three years later, the diocese revoked the suspension.

Fr. Vadakkan wrote about 50 books and brought out poetry collections and plays. He has also written his famous autobiography "Ente Kuthippum Kithappum".

== Death ==
Father Joseph Vadakkan died on 28 December 2002 after suffering an illness related to his advanced age. He was 83. A large number of farmers and Church leaders, led by Varkey Cardinal Vithayathil, and Archbishop Jacob Thoomkuzhy of Trichur, attended Father Vadakkan's funeral service on 30 December 2002.
