= Second Namboodiripad ministry =

1967–69 government of Kerala, India

Second E M S ministry
- 4th Cabinet of Kerala
- 1967–1969
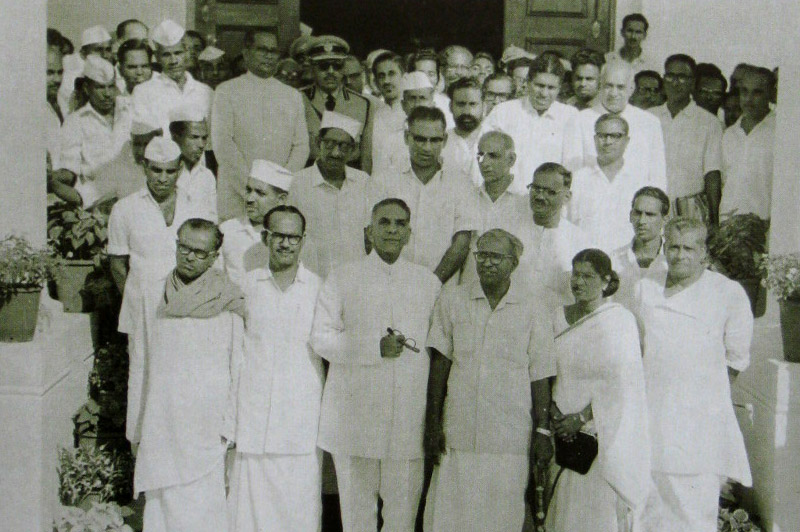
- E.M.S. with his colleagues and Governor Bhagwan Sahay
- Date formed: 6 March 1967
- Date dissolved: 1 November 1969

People and organisations
- Head of government: E. M. S. Namboodiripad
- Member party: Saptakakshi Munnani
- Status in legislature: Coalition Majority
- Opposition party: Indian National Congress
- Opposition leader: K. Karunakaran

History
- Election: 1967
- Predecessor: Sankar ministry
- Successor: First Achutha Menon Ministry

The Council of Ministers (1967–69) of Legislative Assembly, Kerala state (better known as E. M. S. Namboodiripad ministry – second term) was the Council of Ministers, the executive wing of state government, in the Indian state of Kerala. The ministry was led (Chief Minister) by Communist Party of India (Marxist) leader E. M. S. Namboodiripad from 6 March 1967 to 1 November 1969 and had thirteen ministries.

== Council of Ministers ==
#	Name	Portfolio	Notes
1.	E. M. S. Namboodiripad	Chief Minister (Also in charge of Home Department)	
2.	K. R. Gowri Amma	Minister for Revenue, Food and Civil Supplies	
3.	E. K. Imbichibava	Minister for Transport & Communication	
4.	M.K. Krishnan	Minister for Forest and Harijan welfare	
5.	P. R. Kurup	Minister for Irrigation and Co-operation	Resigned w.e.f 21 October 1969
6.	P. K. Kunju	Minister for Finance	Resigned w.e.f. 13 May 1969
7.	C. H. Mohammed Koya	Minister for Education	Resigned w.e.f. 21 October 1969
8.	M. P. M. Ahammed Kurikkal	Minister for Panchayath and community development	Expired on 24 October 1968
(8)	K. Avukaderkutty Naha	Minister for Panchayath and community development	Assumed office on 9 November 1968 and Resigned w. e. f. 21 October 1969
9.	M. N. Govindan Nair	Minister for Agriculture and Electricity	Resigned w.e.f. 21 October 1969
10.	T. V. Thomas	Minister for Industries	Resigned w.e.f. 21 October 1969
11.	B. Wellington	Minister for Health	Resigned w.e.f. 21 October 1969
12.	T. K. Divakaran	Minister for Public Works	Resigned w.e.f. 21 October 1969
13.	Mathai Manjooran	Minister for labour	

== See also ==
- Saptakakshi Munnani
