= Karshaka Thozhilali Party =

Indian political party

Karshaka Thozhilali Party (KTP) was a political party in Kerala formed by Fr. Joseph Vadakkan and B. Wellington.

KTP was part of the government in Kerala from 1967 to 1969 in which E. M. S. Namboodiripad was the chief minister and B. Wellington was the health minister. When the state went to the polls at the time of general elections in March 1967, a new polarization of political forces had emerged in the meantime, leading to new electoral alliances. Politically the most potent combination was the new united front of the Communist Party of India (Marxist), the Communist Party of India, the Muslim League, the Revolutionary Socialist Party (India), the Karshaka Thozhilali Party and the Kerala Socialist Party. This seven-party combine was voted to power leading to the formation of a ministry headed by Shri.E. M. S. Namboodiripad.
