= Bank Employees Federation of India =

Bank trade union

BEFI
- Bank Employees Federation of India
- BEFI
- Founded: 1982
- Headquarters: Naresh Paul Centre, 53 Radha Bazar Lane, Kolkata 700001, India
- Location: India
- Members: 125000
- Key people: S.S.Anil, President; Debasish Basu Chowdhury, General Secretary
- Affiliations: BANK EMPLOYEES FEDERATION OF INDIA
- Website: befi.in

Bank Employees Federation of India (BEFI) is a bank trade union consisting of employees of commercial banks, Reserve Bank of India, NABARD, regional rural banks and co-operative banks. The federation espouses the causes concerning service conditions of bank employees, development of the banking industry, defense of public sector banking in India and exemplary service to customers, including the marginal and neglected. It is focused for the betterment of the working class and for India's economic and political independence.

== Affiliations and groups ==
BEFI is not affiliated with any Central Trade Union of the country, but it has fraternal relations with Centre of India Trade Unions (CITU). BEFI has strong presence in India in the States of Assam, Bihar, Himachal Pradesh, Jharkhand, Kerala, Orissa, Tripura, West Bengal, Punjab, Tamil Nadu, Andhra Pradesh, Telangana, Karnataka etc. Among the Nationalised Bank employees, BEFI is the third largest organisation. All India Bank Employees Association and National Confederation of Bank Employees occupy the first two positions. But in Regional Rural Banks BEFI affiliates represent the majority workforce.

Indian Bank Employees Association, an affiliate of Bank Employees Federation of India is running a school (Indian Bank Employees Association Tamil Nadu High School) at Kurichi village near Pattukottai in Thanjavur District, Tamil Nadu. This school was established in the year 2002 and in just 8 years of its existence, the school has won many accolades including the honour of a science project done by the students being selected for the prestigious National Children's Science Congress.

== Foundation of Bank Employees Federation of India ==
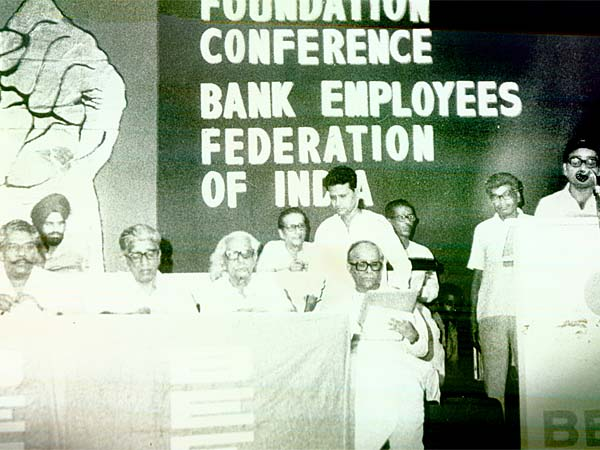
First conference of the Bank Employees Federation of India

The Foundation Conference of Bank Employees Federation of India was held in Calcutta on 13 to 16 October 1982. It was attended by delegates and observers from 9 State-level organizations and 4 All India Bankwise Unions. The inaugural session was held on 13 October at Subodh Mallick Square preceded by processions from BBD Bagh and various other zones. Inauguration of the Conference was done by veteran Trade Union leader B.T. Ranadive, President of Centre of Indian Trade Unions. Delegates session was inaugurated on 14 October 1982 by Jyoti Basu, Vice-President, CITU, and Chief Minister of West Bengal.

== Central Committee Members ==
PRESIDENT

S.S. Anil, Aiswarya, Muppathadam Post, Aluva, Kerala-683110.

VICE-PRESIDENTS

1. R. Ajayakumar, 40-25-40, Ramakrishna Apart. Chennakesava Rao Street, Patamatalawka, Vijayawada - 520010.

2. Joydeb Dasgupta, C/o. UCO Bank Emp. Association, UCO Bank, 10 Brabourne Road, Kolkata - 700001.

3. C. Rajeevan, 'PREM', Chadipurath, Chevayur P.O., Kozhikode, Kerala - 673017.

4. Ranjan Raj, Flat No.D2, Gopal Block Dewkidham Apartments Anandpuri (Besides RadhakrishnaUtsav Hall), West Boring Canal Road, Patna - 800001.

5. Sunil Raj P.S., Anugraha, Souterpet, 5th Cross, Mangalore - 575002.

6. Pradeep Kumar Sharma, Milan Nagar bye lane 1, House No.1, Lalmati-Bhetapara Road, Near LalmatiDurgaMandir, P.O. Basistha, Guwahati - 781029.

7. Saji O Varghese, Edathil House, Post.Kallekulangara, Dist.Palakkad, Kerala - 678009.

GENERAL SECRETARY

Debasish Basu Chaudhury, 70, Karbala Tank Road, Near Maniktala Bazar, Kolkata - 700006.

SECRETARIES

1. S. Harirao, M-595, 2nd Phase, Tamilnadu Housing Board, Royakottah Road, Krishnagiri, Tamilnadu - 635002.

2. Manodip Ghosh, Emami City, Flat No.B3-1303, 2 no. Jessore Road, Kolkata, West Bengal - 700028.

JOINT SECRETARIES

1. Bhanwar Lal Kharwasra, C/O Kishan Singh Dhaka Trust Bhawan, Opp. Court, Sikar, Rajasthan - 332001

2. Narendra Naik,

3. Vinitha P.H., C/O, Dr.M.K.Narayanan, Staff Quarters, University Veterinary Hospital, Kokalai, Thrissur, Kerala - 680007.

4. Bipul Banerjee, Arabinda Arena, Block F, Flat No.9, Rahara, Kolkata, West Bengal -700118.

5. M.V. Harish Babu, B-19, RBI Staff Quarters, Musheerabad, RTC X Roads, Hyderabad, Telangana - 500020.

6. Swapnil Suresh Kondilkar, Shree Samarth Krupa Niwas, Near Khamkar and Shankar RautChawl, KatrapGaon, Badlapur East, Maharashtra - 421503.

7. Y.Aswath, No.1-23 Kallar Street, Adhichamangalam Post, Valagaimantk, Thiruvarur Dist., Tamil Nadu - 612804.

TREASURER

Sandip Pal, 61/01, Sneha Apartment, 1 No. Govt Colony, P.O.Makhla, P.S.Uttarpara, Dist. Hoogly-712245

ANDHRA PRADESH

1. Suryadevara Ranga Rao, Syndicate Bank, Buckhimghampet Branch, Vijayawada – 520 002 (A.P.)

2. P.V.Rahul Tej, C/o. Andhra Pragathi Grameen Bank, Yerramukkapali Branch, Housing Board Colony, Kadapa, Andhra Pradesh - 516004.

BIHAR

1. Ranjan Kumar Raj, C/o. Indian Bank, Patna Main, Biscomaun Bhawan, Gandhi Maidan, Patna - 800001.

2. Umesh Kr. Verma, C/o. Punjab National Bank, Prtg. & Stationery Counter, Anishabad, Patna, Bihar - 800002.

3. Ajay Chatterjee, "BRATALAYA", Rajendra Path, Near CDA Bldg., Opp. Hotel Maharaja Inn, Patna - 800001.

4. Sanjay Kumar, C/o. Allahabad Bank, Patna Main Branch, Kotwali (Opp. Budh Marg), Patna - 800001.

MAHARASHTRA

1. Milind S. Dharmadhikari, C/o. Canara Bank, Parel Branch, Gokhale Society Lane, Parel, Mumbai - 400012.

CHHATTISGARH

1. Dipak Kr. Sarkar, C/o. Punjab National Bank, Station Road Branch, Hotel Trimurti Complex, Raipur, Chhattisgarh - 492009.

DELHI

1. Sunil Mehendiratta, C/o. Punjab & Sind Bank, Zonal Inspectorate, 2nd Floor, 17/169 Subhash Nagar, New Delhi - 110064.

EASTERN MAHARASHTRA

1. V. V. Asai, 108 Adarsh Apartment, B/4 Labour Court, Civil Lines, Nagpur - 440001.

HIMACHAL PRADESH

1. Ravi Kiran Ahuja, C/o. UCO Bank, Parwanoo, Distt. Solan, Himachal Pradesh - 173220.

JHARKHAND

Munindra Lal Singh, C/o. Union Bank of India, Ranchi Main Branch, Kutchery Road, Saheed Chowk, Jharkhand - 834001.

Saket Kumar Sinha, Kusum Vihar Hirak, Ring Road, PO : BCCL Township, PS: Saraidhela, Dhanbad, Jharkhand - 826005.

KARNATAKA

K. Nagaraja Shanbhogue, C/o. Canara Bank, Retail Asset, Hub, Raman Shri Arcade, 3rd Floor, M. G. Road, Bangalore - 560001.

R. Ghanamalli, Syndicate Bank, Belagal Branch, Door No.2, Medar Ketayyanagar, Near KMF, Bellary - 583104.

KERALA

Shaju Antony, C/o. The Federal Bank Ltd., Nedumbassery Branch, PO : Vapalassery, Ernakulam, Kerala - 683572.

V. B. Padmakumar, Head Office, Kerala Bank, COBANK Towers, Thiruvananthapuram, Alappuzha, Kerala - 695001.

Saj O. Varghese, C/o. State Bank of India, Puthur Branch, Distt. Palakkad, Kerala - 678001.

T. Narendran, C/o. The Federal Bank Ltd., Mission Quarters, S. T. Nagar, Trichur, Kerala - 680001.

MANIPUR

Mutum Anand Meeti, C/o. UCO Bank, Mantripukhri, Mantripukhri Branch, Uripok, Bachaspati Leikai, Imphal West, Manipur - 795001.

NORTH EASTERN REGION

Parimal Sen, "Santam", Lachit Nagar Bye Lane-6, House No. 6, Guwahati -781001.

Biswajit Ghatak, C/o. Central Bank of India, Fancy Bazar Branch, Guwahati - 781001

ASSAM

Benudhar Sarma, C/o. United Bank of India, Nagatila Point Branch, Dewan Mansion, Silchar, Assam - 788006.

ODISHA

Ashok Kumar Mohanty, C/o. Indian Bank, Zonal Office, B-2, First Floor, East Sahidnagar, Bhubaneswar, Odisha - 751007

Pravash Ch. Sandha, C/o. Bank of Baroda, Cuttack Road Branch, 227, Sarala Nagar, Laxmisagar, Bhubaneswar - 751006.

Sushil Giri, C/o. United Bank of India, Hotel Kalinga Ashoka Premises, Bhubaneswar.

PUNJAB

Mukhtar Singh, H. No.2669, Near R.K.Model School, Palah Sahib Road, Anjala Road, Amritsar, Punjab - 143008.

RAJASTHAN

Banwari Lal Nehra, C/o. Baroda Rajasthan Kshetriya Gramin Bank, Fatehpur Road, Sikar, Rajasthan - 332001,

Bhanwar Lal Karwasra, C/o. Baroda Rajasthan Kshetriya Gramin Bank, Palthana Branch, Sikar, Rajasthan.

TAMILNADU

T. Thamilarasu, Flat No. A204, Ramaniyam, Chaitanya Apartment, 100, Madhya Church Road, Nerkunam, Chennai-600107.

N. Subramanian, 23, Viswashara 2nd Street, Church Road, Saibaba Colony, Coimbatore, Tamil Nadu - 641038.

S. Harirao, C/o. Indian Bank, Hosur Branch, R V N Plaza, Denkanikotta Road, Tamil Nadu - 635109.

S. A. Rajendran, C/o. Canara Bank, Alagapuram Branch, Sri Saradha Vidyalaya, HSS Complex, Fairlands, Salem, Tamil Nadu - 636016.

TELANGANA

G. Uma Shankar, C/o. Union Bank of India, Ramkote Branch, Hyderabad, Telangana - 500001.

Tirumareddi . Satish, C/o. Telangana Grameena Bank, Service Branch (Head Office), H. No. 2-1-520, Vijayasri Sai celestia, Street no 9, Nallakunta, Hyderabad - 500044.

TRIPURA

Siba Prasad Chakraborty, C/o. UCO Bank, Main Branch, Central Road, Agartala - 799001.

UCBEA

Amar Nath Verma, 266A/18 Bihasti Pura, Aryanagar, Rohtak, Haryana - 124001.

WEST BENGAL

Ashoke Das, C/o. Allahabad Bank, Kolkata Main Branch, 14 India Exchange Place, Kolkata - 700001.

Biplab Acharya, C/o. Union Bank of India, Overseas Branch, 9 India Exchange Place, Kolkata - 700001.

Partha Majumdar, C/o. Bank of Baroda, Brabourne Road Branch,4 Brabourne Road, Kolkata - 700001.

Barun Kumar Chakrabarti, C/o. United Bank of India, Netaji Market Branch, P.O. & Distt. - Malda, West Bengal - 732101.

Anupam Mitra, 577/B Sauli Bot Tala 2nd Lane, P.O. Chandan Nagar, Distt. Hooghly, West Bengal - 712136.

Nupur Ray, C/o. NABARD, 6 Royd Street, Kolkata - 700016.
