= Kerala Gazetted Officers' Association =

Service organization in Kerala, India

KGOA
- Kerala Gazetted Officers' Association
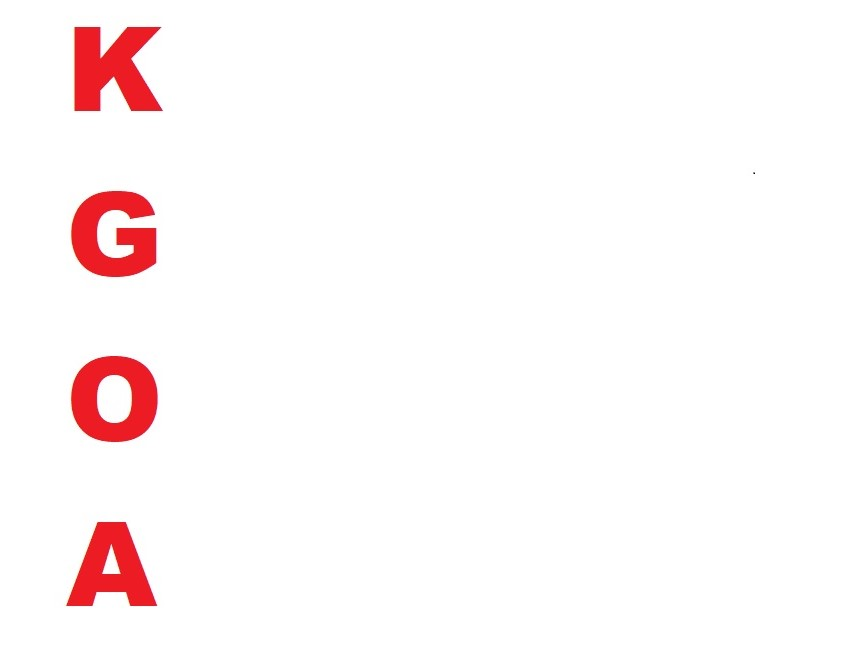
- The Kerala Gazetted Officers' Association flag
- Founded: 1966
- Headquarters: Thiruvananthapuram, Kerala 8.497682°N 76.951837°E
- Location: India
- Members: 22,000 (approx.)
- Key people: Dr. M A Nazar (President); Dr. S R Mohanachandran (General Secretary)
- Website: kgoa.in

Kerala Gazetted Officers' Association (KGOA) is a service organization in the state of Kerala, India, that represents the Gazetted Officers of the state civil service. Founded in 1966, the organization consists of professionals like Engineers, Physicians, Veterinary Surgeons, Agricultural Officers, Scientific & Technical officers, Administrators, and Ministerial officers. Approximately 22,000 out of the 35,000 Gazetted Officers in service in the state are members of KGOA.

== Headquarters and organizational structure ==
It is headquartered at the KGOA State Committee Office near the Kerala Secretariat, Palayam, Thiruvananthapuram. The state committee, composed of elected members, acts as the apex decision-making and organizational body. There are district committees and offices in each district that carry out functions at the district-level.

== Office bearers ==
The state-level office bearers of The Kerala Gazetted Officers' Association (as of 2021) are listed below.

KGOA State-Level Office Bearers
Name	Position
Dr. M A Nazar	President
Dr. S R Mohanachandran	General Secretary
P V Jinraj	Treasurer
Dr. E T Bindhu	Vice President
T N Mini	Vice President
P P Sudhakaran	Vice President
Dr. Shaji K K	Secretary
A Bindhu	Secretary
M Shajhan	Secretary
