= 1967 Kerala Legislative Assembly election =

1967 Kerala election: United Front victory

- 21 February 1967

All 133 seats in the Kerala Legislative Assembly 67 seats needed for a majority
- Turnout: 75.67% (▲0.55%)
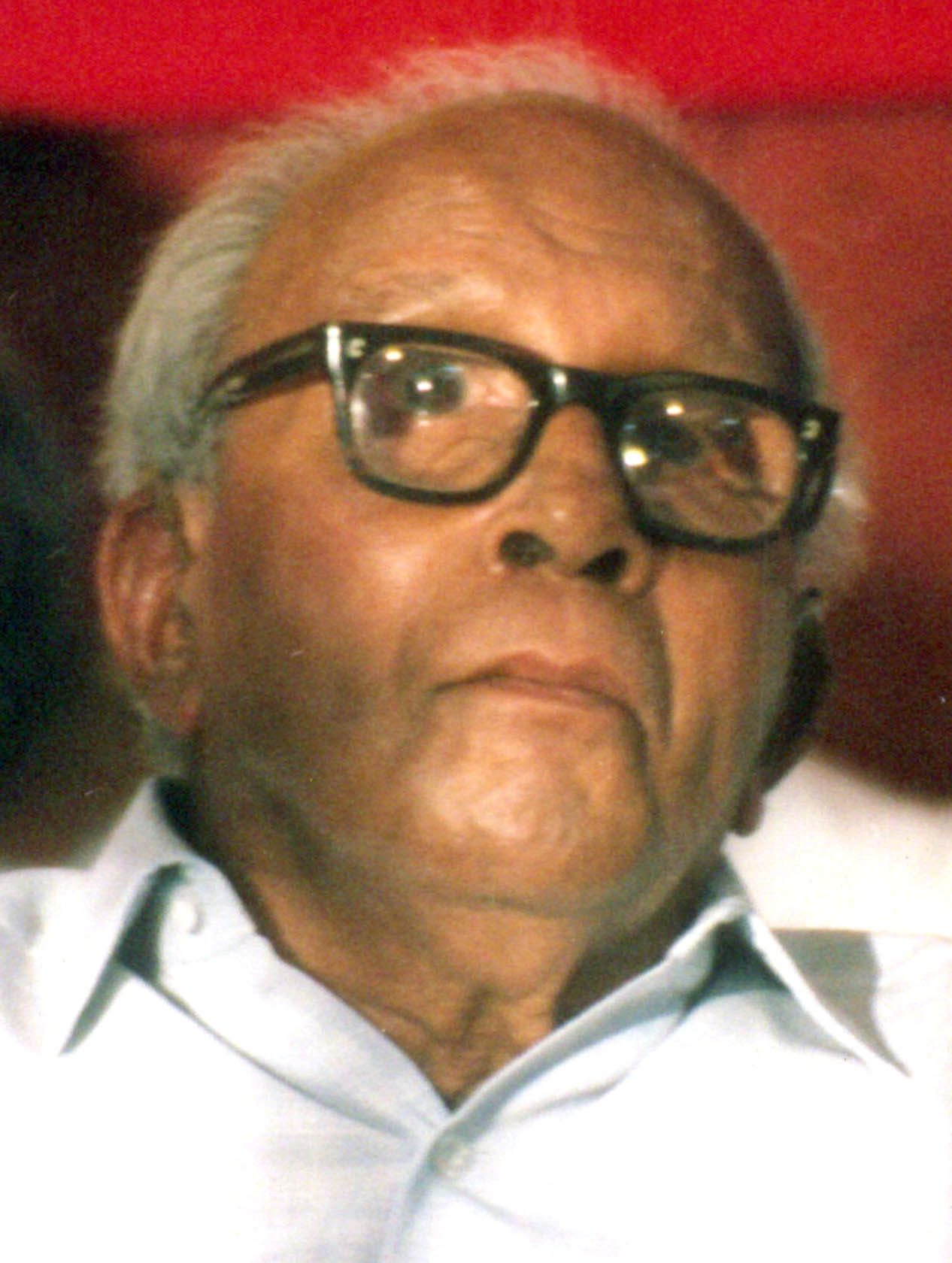

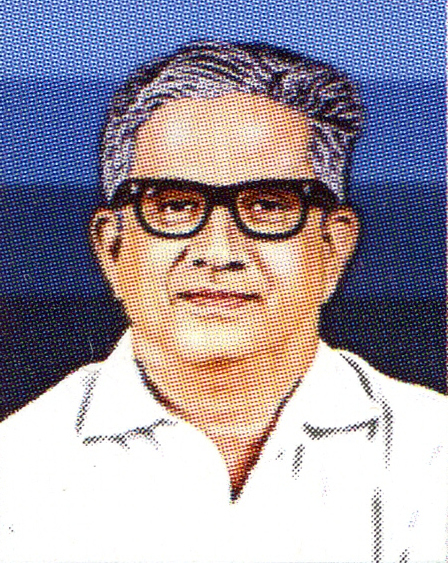

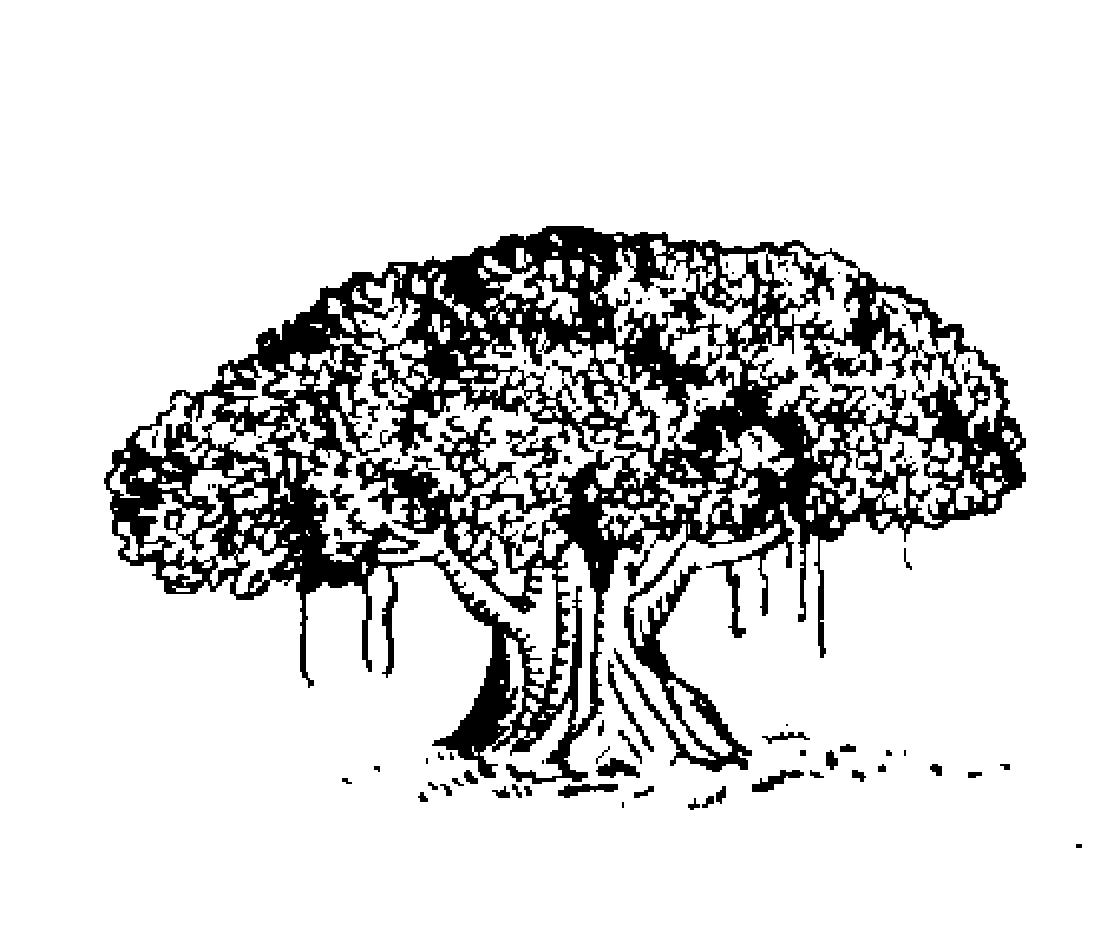

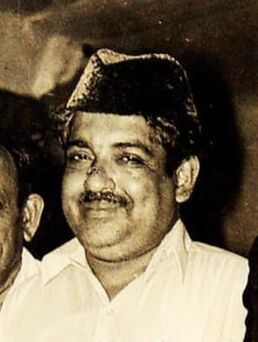

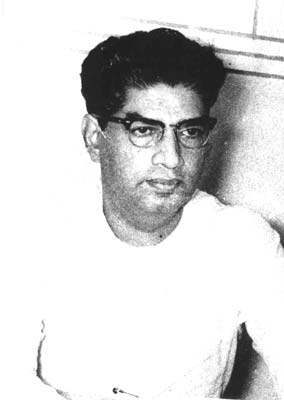

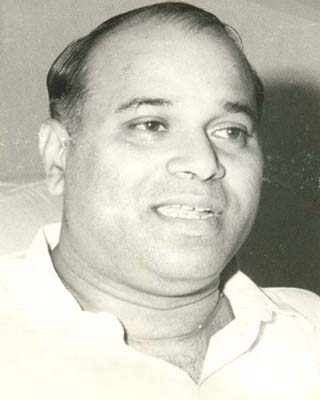
	First party	Second party	Third party
Leader	E. M. S. Namboodiripad	C. Achutha Menon	N. K. Balakrishnan
Party	CPI(M)	CPI	SSP
Alliance	Saptakakshi Munnani	Saptakakshi Munnani	Saptakakshi Munnani
Leader's seat	Pattambi	Did not contest	Hosdrug
Last election	40	3	13
Seats won	52	19	19
Seat change	▲12	▲16	▲6
Percentage	23.51%	8.57%	8.4%
	Fourth party	Fifth party	Sixth party
Leader	C. H. Mohammed Koya	R. Sankar	K. M. George
Party	IUML	INC	KEC
Alliance	Saptakakshi Munnani
Leader's seat	Mankada	Did not contest	Poonjar
Last election	6	36	6
Seats won	14	9	5
Seat change	▲8	▼27	▼1
Percentage	6.75%	35.43%	7.57%
Chief Minister before election
Vacant
President's Rule
Elected Chief Minister
E. M. S. Namboodiripad
CPI(M)

The Kerala Legislative Assembly election of 1967 was held to constitute the third assembly in Kerala.

This election, was held in the backdrop of the 1965 election which resulted in a hung assembly and subsequent President's rule. As a result of that, the Communist Party of India (Marxist) formed a seven-member coalition known as the Saptakakshi Munnani. The Indian National Congress and the Kerala Congress contested separately.

The election resulted in a landslide victory for the Saptakakshi Munnani which won a whopping 113 out 133 seats, the highest won by a coalition till date. The Indian National Congress suffered a massive debacle, being reduced to a mere 9 seats- the worst performance of the party in the state till date.

Veteran Communist Leader E. M. S. Namboodiripad was sworn in as the Chief Minister on 6 March 1967.

Congress Leader and Mala legislator K. Karunakaran took over as the new Leader of the Opposition.

Future Chief Minister V. S. Achuthanandan was first elected to the assembly in 1967.

== Background ==
In the 1965 elections, no party was able to form a government in Kerala. No viable coalition took shape, and Kerala went back to President Rule for another 2 years.

Kerala again went back to the polls in 1967. Both communist parties - CPI (M) and CPI - along with smaller parties including SSP and Muslim League contested this election as a United Front. A total of seven parties contested in the front, and the front was known as Saptakakshi Munnani. Congress and Kerala Congress contested separately. The total polling percentage was 75

== Constituencies ==
There were 133 constituencies in total, out of which 120 were General Category, 11 Scheduled Castes, and 2 Scheduled Tribe seats.

== Political parties ==
The national parties contested were the Communist Party of India, Communist Party of India (Marxist), Indian National Congress, Praja Socialist Party, Sanghata Socialist Party, and Swatantra Party along with the state parties Indian Union Muslim League and Kerala Congress.

== Results ==
Summary of results of the 1967 Kerala Legislative Assembly election
Political Party	Flag	Seats Contested	Won	Net Change in seats	% of Seats	Votes	Vote %	Change in vote %
Communist Party of India (Marxist)		59	52	▲12	39.10	1,476,456	23.51	▲3.64
Communist Party of India		22	19	▲16	14.29	538,004	8.57	▲0.27
Samyukta Socialist Party		21	19	▲6	14.29	527,662	8.4	▲0.27
Indian Union Muslim League		15	14	▲8	10.53	424,159	6.75	▲2.92
Indian National Congress	INC Flag Official	133	9	▼27	6.77	2,789,556	35.43	▲1.88
Kerala Congress		61	5	▼1	3.76	475,172	7.57	▼5.01
Praja Socialist Party		7	0	NA	0	13,991	0.22	NA
Swatantra Party		6	0	NA	14.29	13,105	0.21	NA
Bharatiya Jana Sangh		22	0	NA	0	55,584	0.88	NA
Independent		75	15	▲3	11.28	531,783	8.47	▼5.27
		Total Seats	133	Voters	8,613,658	Turnout	6,518,272 (75.67%)	

=== By constituency ===
Constituency		Poll%	Winner				Runner Up				Margin	%
#	Name	Poll%	Candidate	Party	Votes	%	Candidate	Party	Votes	%	Margin	%
1	Manjeshwar	73.04%	K. M. Bhandary	IND	23,471	54.41	M. R. Rai	CPI(M)	18,690	43.32	4,781	11.09
2	Kasargod	78.21%	U. P. Kunikullaya	IND	20,635	44.95	H. A. Schemnad	IUML	20,540	44.75	95	0.20
3	Hosdrug	72.50%	N. K. Balakrishnan	SSP	25,717	55.72	M. N. Nambiar	INC	16,056	34.79	9,661	20.93
4	Nileswar	71.78%	V. V. Kunhambu	CPI(M)	34,496	70.64	T. P. G. Namboodiri	INC	12,909	26.43	21,587	44.21
5	Edakkad	82.42%	C. Kannan	CPI(M)	32,563	58.99	P. P. Lakshmanan	INC	22,125	40.08	10,438	18.91
6	Cannanore	83.74%	E. Ahamed	IUML	35,261	56.64	N. K. Kumaran	INC	26,997	43.36	8,264	13.28
7	Madayi	78.58%	M. Manjuran	IND	32,974	67.72	P. Krishnan	INC	13,862	28.47	19,112	39.25
8	Payyannur	74.23%	A. V. Kunhabgu	CPI(M)	29,835	63.47	V. T. N. Poduval	INC	14,774	31.43	15,061	32.04
9	Taliparamba	77.83%	K. P. R. Poduval	CPI(M)	31,508	56.41	N. C. Varghese	INC	22,233	39.80	9,275	16.61
10	Irikkur	77.46%	E. P. K. Nambiar	CPI(M)	31,590	65.45	K. R. Karunakaran	INC	16,679	34.55	14,911	30.90
11	Kuthuparamba	78.19%	K. K. Abee	SSP	28,449	58.07	M. K. Krishnan	INC	17,797	36.32	10,652	21.75
12	Tellicherry	80.91%	K. P. R. Gopalan	CPI(M)	34,612	61.39	P. Nanoo	INC	21,772	38.61	12,840	22.78
13	Peringalam	78.19%	P. R. Kurup	SSP	38,701	74.81	N. M. Nambiar	INC	13,034	25.19	25,667	49.62
14	North Wynad (ST)	59.62%	K. K. Annan	CPI(M)	19,983	57.17	C. M. Kulian	INC	14,970	42.83	5,013	14.34
15	Badagara	79.57%	M. Krishnan	SSP	37,488	74.29	M. Venugopal	INC	12,977	25.71	24,511	48.58
16	Nadapuram	78.23%	E. V. Kumaran	CPI(M)	31,395	64.17	P. Balakrishnan	INC	14,936	30.53	16,459	33.64
17	Meppayur	79.55%	M. K. Kelu	CPI(M)	33,365	68.09	C. K. Kurup	INC	15,639	31.91	17,726	36.18
18	Quilandy	82.27%	P. K. Kidave	SSP	32,390	55.89	K. Gopalan	INC	23,375	40.33	9,015	15.56
19	Permbra	79.83%	V. V. D. Moorthy	CPI(M)	30,307	58.65	K. T. K. Nair	INC	18,784	36.35	11,523	22.30
20	Balusseri	83.24%	A. K. Appu	SSP	29,069	53.75	O. K. Govindan	INC	22,491	41.59	6,578	12.16
21	Kunnamangalam	73.79%	V. K. Nair	SSP	28,773	62.18	K. P. Padmanabhan	INC	13,171	28.46	15,602	33.72
22	Kalpetta	62.99%	B. Wellingdon	IND	23,510	62.89	A. V. R. G. Menon	INC	11,960	31.99	11,550	30.90
23	South Wynad (ST)	57.10%	M. Ramunni	SSP	20,220	58.05	M. C. Maru	INC	14,610	41.95	5,610	16.10
24	Calicut I	84.66%	P. C. R. Nair	CPI(M)	32,794	52.41	M. Kamalam	INC	27,710	44.28	5,084	8.13
25	Calicut Ii	78.36%	P. M. Abubacker	IUML	32,415	56.58	V. Zubair	INC	21,859	38.15	10,556	18.43
26	Beypore	77.96%	K. C. Master	CPI(M)	33,479	63.77	I. P. Krishnan	INC	14,947	28.47	18,532	35.30
27	Tirurangadi	76.00%	A. K. N. Laji	IUML	29,267	57.47	T. P. K. Kutty	INC	19,599	38.48	9,668	18.99
28	Tanur	64.71%	M. M. K. Haji	IUML	29,219	66.47	T. A. Kutty	INC	10,491	23.87	18,728	42.60
29	Tirur	74.39%	K. M. K. Haji	IUML	28,558	60.65	R. Muhamed	INC	18,527	39.35	10,031	21.30
30	Kuttippuram	63.77%	C. M. Kutty	IUML	28,245	72.03	P. R. Menon	INC	10,968	27.97	17,277	44.06
31	Kondotty	72.44%	S. U. Bafakih	IUML	33,166	66.11	M. P. Gangadharan	INC	13,874	27.65	19,292	38.46
32	Malappuram	69.01%	M. P. M. A. Kurikkel	IUML	32,813	73.07	A. C. Shanmughadas	INC	12,094	26.93	20,719	46.14
33	Manjeri (SC)	62.72%	M. Chadayan	IUML	23,752	63.66	S. Mariappan	INC	12,636	33.86	11,116	29.80
34	Nilambur	68.11%	K. Kunhali	CPI(M)	25,215	62.04	A. Mohamed	INC	15,426	37.96	9,789	24.08
35	Ponnani	74.41%	V. P. C. Thangal	IUML	30,251	61.63	K. G. K. Menon	INC	16,430	33.47	13,821	28.16
36	Trithala (SC)	63.19%	E. T. Kunhan	CPI(M)	24,119	59.28	K. Kunhambu	INC	14,485	35.60	9,634	23.68
37	Pattambi	66.91%	E. M. S. Namboodiripad	CPI(M)	23,955	59.85	K. G. Menon	INC	11,838	29.58	12,117	30.27
38	Ottapalam	58.11%	P. P. Krishnan	CPI(M)	21,086	61.64	M. N. Kurup	INC	13,123	38.36	7,963	23.28
39	Sreekrishnapuram	53.15%	C. G. Panicker	CPI(M)	18,762	66.36	K. R. Nair	INC	9,510	33.64	9,252	32.72
40	Mankada	63.46%	H. C. H. M. Koya	IUML	29,503	79.82	V. S. A. C. K. Thangal	INC	4,986	13.49	24,517	66.33
41	Perintalmanna	53.00%	P. M. Kutty	CPI(M)	24,285	76.37	P. M. Sadio	INC	7,513	23.63	16,772	52.74
42	Mannarghat	51.25%	E. K. I. Bava	CPI(M)	20,504	65.24	N. Balasubramanyan	INC	8,608	27.39	11,896	37.85
43	Palghat	68.75%	R. Krishnan	CPI(M)	24,627	54.13	K. Sankaranayayan	INC	14,996	32.96	9,631	21.17
44	Malampuzha	62.76%	M. P. Kunhiraman	CPI(M)	27,454	70.32	A. Narayanan	INC	11,585	29.68	15,869	40.64
45	Chittur	66.85%	K. A. S. Bharathy	SSP	23,985	58.27	A. S. Sahib	INC	17,174	41.73	6,811	16.54
46	Kollengode	61.64%	C. V. Menon	CPI(M)	19,779	51.93	Gangadharan	INC	14,370	37.73	5,409	14.20
47	Alathur	63.47%	R. Krishnan	CPI(M)	25,467	65.14	Sarada	INC	13,630	34.86	11,837	30.28
48	Kuzhalmannam (SC)	53.99%	O. Koran	SSP	19,138	57.75	E. Kontha	INC	11,452	34.55	7,686	23.20
49	Chelakara (SC)	71.10%	P. Kunhan	CPI(M)	21,175	50.54	K. K. Balakrishnan	INC	19,123	45.65	2,052	4.89
50	Wadakkancherry	77.38%	N. K. Seshan	SSP	23,857	49.61	K. S. N. Namboodiri	INC	22,173	46.11	1,684	3.50
51	Kunnamkulam	80.67%	A. S. N. Nambissan	CPI(M)	27,014	50.57	A. K. Kunhunny	INC	24,930	46.67	2,084	3.90
52	Manalur	83.94%	N. I. Devassykutty	INC	26,523	49.15	V. Mecheri	IND	26,374	48.88	149	0.27
53	Trichur	80.36%	K. S. Nair	CPI(M)	26,149	48.72	T. P. Seetharaman	INC	25,547	47.60	602	1.12
54	Ollur	81.04%	A. V. Aryan	CPI(M)	24,569	49.12	P. P. Francis	INC	24,421	48.83	148	0.29
55	Irinjalakuda	81.00%	C. K. Rajan	CPI	27,151	53.59	R. Pozhekadavil	INC	23,515	46.41	3,636	7.18
56	Kodakara	80.09%	P. S. Namboodiri	CPI	24,265	52.52	P. R. Krishnan	INC	15,680	33.94	8,585	18.58
57	Chalakudi	79.82%	P. P. Geroge	INC	26,568	50.74	P. K. Chathan	CPI	23,107	44.13	3,461	6.61
58	Mala	80.29%	K. Karunakaran	INC	23,563	50.39	K. A. Thomas	CPI	23,199	49.61	364	0.78
59	Guruvayur	78.93%	B. V. S. Thangal	IUML	20,986	46.86	A. A. Kochunny	INC	20,523	45.83	463	1.03
60	Nattika	84.05%	T. K. Krishnan	CPI(M)	27,635	52.87	K. K. Viswanathan	INC	24,634	47.13	3,001	5.74
61	Cranganore	84.78%	P. K. Gopalakrishnan	CPI	26,536	51.54	M. Sagir	INC	23,221	45.10	3,315	6.44
62	Ankamali	83.19%	A. P. Kurian	CPI(M)	21,427	42.15	A. C. George	INC	15,237	29.98	6,190	12.17
63	Vadakkekara	82.17%	E. Balanandan	CPI(M)	28,234	50.57	K. R. Vijayan	INC	27,601	49.43	633	1.14
64	Parur	80.03%	K. T. George	INC	17,418	38.22	V. Painadan	IND	13,719	30.11	3,699	8.11
65	Narakal	86.10%	A. S. Purushothaman	CPI(M)	24,616	49.38	K. C. Abraham	INC	23,474	47.09	1,142	2.29
66	Mattancherry	75.93%	M. P. M. Jafferkhan	IUML	28,175	52.51	P. T. Jacob	INC	21,763	40.56	6,412	11.95
67	Paliuruthy	82.63%	P. Gangadharan	CPI(M)	24,779	49.08	A. L. Jacob	INC	23,395	46.34	1,384	2.74
68	Thrippunithura	85.43%	T. K. Ramakrishnan	CPI(M)	27,435	48.87	P. P. Mani	INC	25,976	46.27	1,459	2.60
69	Ernakulam	77.05%	A. Parambithara	INC	23,270	45.65	K. A. Rajan	CPI	22,973	45.07	297	0.58
70	Alwaye	83.60%	M. K. A. Hameed	IND	29,978	56.06	V. P. Marakkar	INC	20,360	38.08	9,618	17.98
71	Perumbavoor	80.23%	P. G. Pillai	CPI(M)	23,161	49.15	K. G. R. Kartha	INC	17,996	38.19	5,165	10.96
72	Kunnathunad (SC)	79.49%	M. K. Krishnan	CPI(M)	28,083	54.38	K. K. Madhavan	INC	21,203	41.06	6,880	13.32
73	Kothamangalam	85.79%	T. M. Meethiyan	CPI(M)	21,210	41.40	M. I. Markose	KEC	14,822	28.93	6,388	12.47
74	Muvattupuzha	80.26%	P. V. Abraham	CPI	21,333	42.88	K. C. Paily	INC	15,400	30.95	5,933	11.93
75	Thodupuzha	80.64%	K. C. Zachariah	IND	18,780	43.99	E. M. Joseph	KEC	17,286	40.49	1,494	3.50
76	Karimannoor	73.61%	M. M. Thomas	IND	19,070	48.15	A. C. Chacko	KEC	12,870	32.49	6,200	15.66
77	Devicolam (SC)	61.62%	N. Ganapathy	INC	15,895	44.66	G. Varathan	CPI(M)	15,607	43.85	288	0.81
78	Udumbanchola	65.41%	K. T. Jacob	CPI	28,085	52.73	Mathachan	KEC	19,021	35.71	9,064	17.02
79	Peermade (SC)	59.98%	K. I. Rajan	CPI(M)	18,934	52.07	Ramiah	INC	12,199	33.55	6,735	18.52
80	Kanjirapally	72.66%	M. Kamal	CPI(M)	22,681	51.41	C. J. Antony	KEC	14,335	32.49	8,346	18.92
81	Vazhoor	76.90%	K. P. Pillai	CPI	19,789	48.40	K. N. Kurup	KEC	14,760	36.10	5,029	12.30
82	Changanacherry	81.49%	K. G. N. Nambudiripad	CPI	21,278	42.97	K. J. Chacko	KEC	15,353	31.01	5,925	11.96
83	Puthupally	79.80%	E. M. George	CPI(M)	22,589	48.50	P. C. Cheriyan	INC	17,037	36.58	5,552	11.92
84	Kottayam	81.30%	M. K. George	CPI(M)	25,298	51.37	M. P. G. Nair	INC	16,188	32.87	9,110	18.50
85	Ettumanoor	82.32%	P. P. Wilson	SSP	20,248	40.82	M. M. Joseph	KEC	16,213	32.68	4,035	8.14
86	Akalakunnam	76.62%	J. A. Chacko	KEC	18,049	43.24	M. G. K. Nair	CPI(M)	15,770	37.78	2,279	5.46
87	Poonjar	74.43%	K. M. George	KEC	19,944	47.55	K. K. Menon	CPI(M)	16,386	39.06	3,558	8.49
88	Palai	82.39%	K. M. Mani	KEC	19,118	38.99	V. T. Thomas	IND	16,407	33.46	2,711	5.53
89	Kaduthuruthy	81.02%	J. Chazhikattu	KEC	18,719	39.60	K. K. Joseph	CPI(M)	16,581	35.07	2,138	4.53
90	Vaikom	84.06%	P. S. Srinivasan	CPI	28,502	54.84	P. Parameswaran	INC	19,043	36.64	9,459	18.20
91	Aroor	84.56%	K. R. G. Thomas	CPI(M)	28,274	54.29	K. Bhasi	INC	21,097	40.51	7,177	13.78
92	Sherthala	83.52%	N. P. Thandar	CPI(M)	23,350	49.52	K. R. Damodaran	INC	15,491	32.85	7,859	16.67
93	Mararikulam	80.09%	S. Damodaran	CPI(M)	30,277	56.50	D. Krishnan	INC	18,246	34.05	12,031	22.45
94	Alleppey	78.62%	T. V. Thomas	CPI	28,880	57.66	G. C. Iyer	INC	15,554	31.06	13,326	26.60
95	Ambalapuzha	80.24%	V. S. Achyuthanandan	CPI(M)	26,627	52.93	A. Achyuthan	INC	17,112	34.01	9,515	18.92
96	Kuttanad	79.15%	K. K. K. Pillai	IND	23,797	48.63	T. John	KEC	16,633	33.99	7,164	14.64
97	Haripad	81.41%	C. B. C. Warrier	CPI(M)	28,199	49.77	K. P. R. Nair	INC	27,079	47.80	1,120	1.97
98	Kayamkulam	81.14%	P. K. Kungu	SSP	27,227	52.26	T. Prabhakaran	INC	23,446	45.01	3,781	7.25
99	Thiruvalla	78.70%	E. J. Jacob	KEC	18,970	37.35	P. K. Mathew	SSP	16,992	33.46	1,978	3.89
100	Kallooppara	77.51%	G. Thomas	INC	17,267	39.03	N. T. George	CPI(M)	13,668	30.89	3,599	8.14
101	Aranmula	77.66%	P. N. Chandrasenan	SSP	19,665	41.37	K. V. Nair	INC	16,743	35.22	2,922	6.15
102	Chengannur	79.67%	P. G. P. Pillai	CPI(M)	17,524	34.76	N. S. K. Pillai	INC	16,004	31.75	1,520	3.01
103	Mavelikara	77.84%	G. G. Pillai	SSP	26,669	51.21	K. K. C. Pillai	INC	23,226	44.60	3,443	6.61
104	Pandalam (SC)	79.68%	P. K. Kunjachan	CPI(M)	27,740	52.27	T. K. Kali	INC	22,825	43.01	4,915	9.26
105	Ranni	71.73%	M. K. Divakaran	CPI	18,628	43.60	N. J. Mathews	INC	12,795	29.95	5,833	13.65
106	Pathanamthitta	81.04%	K. K. Nair	IND	26,351	49.19	V. Idicula	KEC	16,208	30.25	10,143	18.94
107	Konni	81.98%	P. P. R. M. Pillai	CPI	24,775	51.32	P. J. Thomas	INC	21,733	45.02	3,042	6.30
108	Pathanapuram (SC)	73.11%	P. K. Raghwan	CPI	23,401	56.42	P. K. Ramachandradas	INC	11,520	27.77	11,881	28.65
109	Punaloor	80.24%	M. N. G. Nair	CPI	23,931	52.61	P. C. Baby	INC	18,794	41.31	5,137	11.30
110	Chadayamangalam	80.66%	D. D. Potti	SSP	29,980	61.43	B. Pillai	INC	18,122	37.13	11,858	24.30
111	Kottarakara	87.02%	E. C. Nair	CPI	24,672	42.54	R. B. Pillai	KEC	23,112	39.85	1,560	2.69
112	Kunnathur (SC)	76.67%	K. C. S. Sastry	IND	26,510	55.11	T. Kesavan	INC	13,559	28.19	12,951	26.92
113	Adoor	83.68%	Ramalingom	CPI	25,804	50.44	P. Raghavan	IND	12,970	25.35	12,834	25.09
114	Krishnapuram	85.17%	P. U. Pillai	CPI	29,134	58.77	M. K. Hemachandran	INC	18,810	37.94	10,324	20.83
115	Karunagapally	80.42%	B. John	IND	32,227	58.50	K. V. S. Pannikar	INC	20,184	36.64	12,043	21.86
116	Quilon	77.90%	T. K. Divakaran	IND	29,075	56.87	H. Austin	INC	19,324	37.80	9,751	19.07
117	Kundara	81.28%	P. K. Sukumaran	CPI(M)	28,882	50.65	V. S. Pillai	INC	23,288	40.84	5,594	9.81
118	Eravipuram	79.19%	R. S. Unni	IND	31,083	63.41	K. K. Krishnan	INC	17,935	36.59	13,148	26.82
119	Chathannoor	81.58%	P. Ravindran	CPI	27,181	55.00	S. T. Pillai	KEC	15,972	32.32	11,209	22.68
120	Varkala	77.35%	A. Majid	CPI	24,796	58.10	S. Hameed	INC	17,885	41.90	6,911	16.20
121	Attingal	76.90%	K. P. K. Das	CPI(M)	26,871	55.18	B. Purushothaman	INC	21,826	44.82	5,045	10.36
122	Kilimanoor (SC)	75.30%	C. K. Balakrishnan	CPI(M)	25,932	57.18	K. P. Madhavan	INC	19,422	42.82	6,510	14.36
123	Vamanapuram	77.66%	N. V. Pillai	CPI(M)	24,270	59.82	M. K. Pillai	INC	16,305	40.18	7,965	19.64
124	Aryanad	71.30%	M. Majeed	SSP	18,350	51.87	V. Sankaran	INC	14,749	41.69	3,601	10.18
125	Nedumangad	74.70%	K. G. K. Pallai	CPI	20,584	52.46	S. V. Nair	INC	14,931	38.05	5,653	14.41
126	Kazhakuttam	75.38%	M. H. Sahib	IUML	22,008	45.36	N. L. Vaidyan	INC	20,694	42.65	1,314	2.71
127	Trivandrum I	62.53%	B. M. Nair	SSP	22,152	50.53	M. N. G. Nair	INC	19,931	45.46	2,221	5.07
128	Trivandrum II	67.49%	K. C. Vamadevan	IND	27,806	53.69	W. Sebastian	INC	21,744	41.98	6,062	11.71
129	Nemom	72.00%	M. Sadasivan	CPI(M)	22,800	52.02	P. N. Nair	INC	19,764	45.09	3,036	6.93
130	Kovalam	75.34%	J. C. Moraes	IND	18,588	48.75	M. K. Nadar	INC	18,191	47.71	397	1.04
131	Vilappil	74.09%	C. S. N. Nair	SSP	25,104	53.22	M. B. Nair	INC	21,128	44.79	3,976	8.43
132	Neyyatinkara	75.77%	R. G. Nair	INC	24,038	51.28	M. Sathianesan	CPI(M)	22,839	48.72	1,199	2.56
133	Parassala	69.48%	N. Gamaliel	INC	23,299	57.68	V. Titus	IND	17,095	42.32	6,204	15.36

== Government formation ==
The United Front performed spectacularly swept most of the seats. Congress and Kerala Congress were decimated with 9 and 5 seats respectively. E M S became the Chief Minister for the second time. Second E. M. S. Namboodiripad Ministry had 14 members. For the first time in Kerala's history, the cabinet also included members from Muslim League. K. Karunakaran became the opposition leader in the assembly.

== Fall of EMS Government ==
CPI (M) and CPI continued to have suspicions with each other. Due to the alleged high-handedness of CPI (M) in governance, most smaller parties were unsatisfied. This period also was marked by a series of student strikes and police firings. CPI, SSP & Muslim League eventually became a group within the front and worked together. Many ministers from the smaller parties resigned eventually, and many parties subsequently left the front. On 24 October 1969, EMS submitted resignation owing to the loss of majority in the assembly.

== Achutha Menon Ministry ==
Within a week of the resignation of E M S Namboothiripad, M N Govindan Nair of CPI informed the Governor that their party was ready to form an alternate government. CPI formed a government with outside support from Congress. C. Achutha Menon became the Chief Minister of Kerala on 1969, 1 November. The First Achutha Menon Ministry had 8 members.

== See also ==
- 1965 Kerala Legislative Assembly election
- 1970 Kerala Legislative Assembly election
