= B. Wellington =

Indian politician

B. Wellington was a Health Minister of Kerala State.

== Political career ==
Wellington came to active politics through the Student movement. Later he became a follower of Fr. Joseph Vadakkan and became the President of Karshaka Thozhilali Party. He was Health Minister in the Government led by the Communist Party of India (Marxist) veteran E.M.S. Namboodiripad from 1967 to 1969. In 1965 and 1967 he was elected to the Kerala Legislative Assembly from Kalpetta Constituency and in 1970 he was elected from Palluruthy Constituency.
