= Elections in Kerala =

Kerala

Elections in Kerala are regularly held to appoint representatives at various levels, both within the state of Kerala and in India as a whole. These elections encompass national elections, state elections as well as regional elections for municipal bodies and panchayats.

The Kerala Assembly has the authority to enact laws concerning the conduct of local body elections independently. However, any modifications made by the state legislature to the procedures of state-level elections require approval from the Parliament of India. In addition, the state legislature may be dismissed by the Parliament according to Article 356 of the Indian Constitution and President's rule may be imposed.

The Election Commission of India (ECI) prepares the electoral rolls for elections to the Parliament of India (Lok Sabha) and the Kerala Legislative Assembly, and conducts these elections.

Kerala State Election Commission (SEC) prepares the electoral rolls of Panchayats, Municipalities and Municipal Corporations and conduct their elections. The State Election Commissioner is also the Chairman of the Delimitation Commission.

== Types of elections ==
Elections in Kerala include elections for:

- Members of Parliament in the Rajya Sabha (Upper House)
  - Elected indirectly by the elected members of the Kerala Legislative Assembly.
- Members of Parliament in the Lok Sabha (Lower House)
  - Elected directly by the people. Election is based on the first-past-the-post system.
- Members of the Kerala Legislative Assembly (State Assembly)
  - Elected directly by the people who are registered voters in the respective constituency.
- Members of local governance bodies (municipal bodies and panchayats)
  - Elected directly by the people who are registered voters in the respective ward/division.
- A by-election is held when the seat-holder of a particular constituency dies, resigns, or is disqualified.

== Lok Sabha elections ==
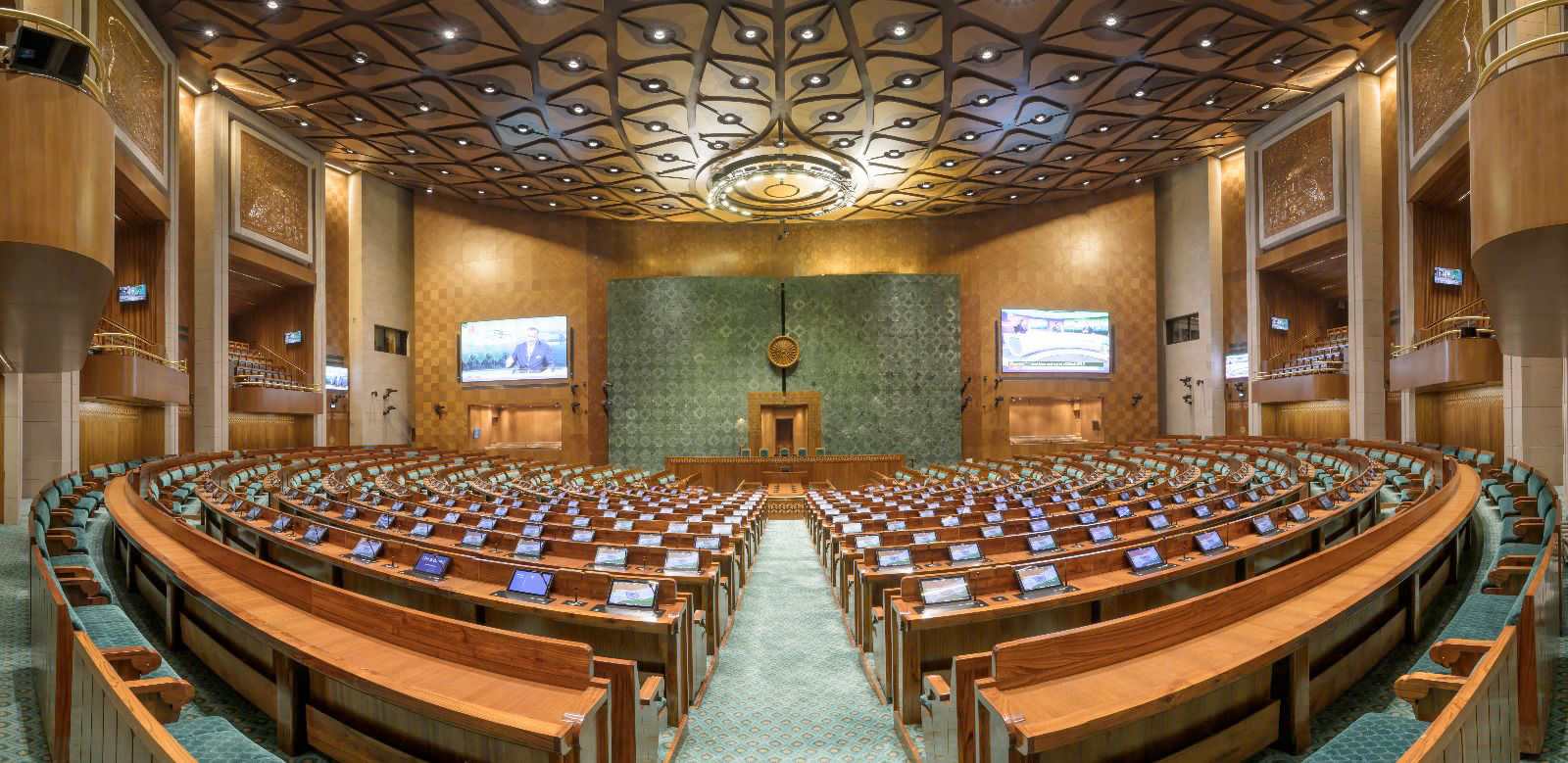
Lok Sabha (Lower House of the Indian Parliament)

Members of parliament in the Lok Sabha (Lower House) from Kerala are directly elected by being voted upon by all adult citizens of the state from a set of candidates who stand in their respective constituencies. Every adult citizen of Kerala can vote only in their constituency. Candidates who win the Lok Sabha elections are called "Members of Parliament" and hold their seats for five years or until the body is dissolved by the president of India on the advice of the council of ministers. The house meets in the Lok Sabha Chamber of the Sansad Bhavan in New Delhi on matters relating to the creation of new laws or removing or improving the existing laws that affect all citizens of India. Elections take place once every five years to elect 20 members from Kerala. The leader of the majority party or alliance in the country takes oath as prime minister of India. Indian General Elections in Kerala has been mainly contested between two political parties since the formation of the state. The Indian National Congress which currently leads United Democratic Front (UDF) alliance and the Communist Party of India (Marxist) which currently leads Left Democratic Front (LDF) alliance. The Indian National Congress has been in lead, 11 out of 16 election from 1957 in Kerala.
The elections for both Lok Sabha and Rajya Sabha are conducted by the Election Commission of India (ECI).

Lok Sabha election results
15th Lok Sabha (2009)	16th Lok Sabha (2014)	17th Lok Sabha (2019)	18th Lok Sabha (2024)

=== Party Wise Results ===
Lok Sabha	Election Year	1st Party	2nd Party	3rd Party	4th Party	Others	Total Seats
2nd Lok Sabha	1957	CPI 9	INC 6	PSP 1		Ind 2	18
3rd Lok Sabha	1962	CPI 6	INC 5	IUML 2	RSP 1	Ind 3	17
4th Lok Sabha	1967	CPI(M) 9	CPI 3	SSP 3	IUML 2	INC 1, Ind 1	19
5th Lok Sabha	1971	INC(R) 6	CPI 3	KC 3	CPI(M) 2	RSP 2, IUML 2, Ind 1	19
6th Lok Sabha	1977	INC 9	CPI 4	IUML 2	KC 2	IC (S) 1, RSP 1	19
7th Lok Sabha	1980	CPI(M) 6	INC (I) 4	INC (U) 3	CPI 2	IUML 2, KC 2, Ind 1	20
8th Lok Sabha	1984	INC 13	KC (J) 2	IUML 2	CPI(M) 1	IC (S) 1, JP 1,	20
9th Lok Sabha	1989	INC 14	CPI(M) 2	IUML 2	KC (M) 1	IC (S) 1	20
10th Lok Sabha	1991	INC 13	CPI(M) 3	IUML 2	KC (M) 1	IC (S) 1	20
11th Lok Sabha	1996	INC 7	CPI(M) 5	CPI 2	IUML 2	JD 1, KC (M) 1, RSP 1, Ind 1	20
12th Lok Sabha	1998	INC 8	CPI(M) 4	CPI 2	IUML 2	KC (M) 1, RSP 1, Ind 2	20
13th Lok Sabha	1999	INC 8	CPI(M) 4	IUML 2	KC(M) 1	KC 1	20
14th Lok Sabha	2004	CPI(M) 12	CPI 3	IUML 1	KC(J) 1	IFDP 1, JD(S) 1, Ind 1	20
15th Lok Sabha	2009	INC 13	CPI(M) 4	IUML 2	KC(M) 1	–	20
16th Lok Sabha	2014	INC 8	CPI(M) 7	IUML 2	CPI 1	KC (M) 1, RSP 1	20
17th Lok Sabha	2019	INC 15	IUML 2	CPI(M) 1	RSP 1	KC(M) 1	20
18th Lok Sabha	2024	INC 14	IUML 2	CPI(M) 1	BJP 1	RSP 1, KC 1	20

=== Alliance Wise Results ===
Year	Lok Sabha Election	1st Alliance	Seats won	2nd Alliance	Seats won	Other parties	Seats won
1957	2nd	CPI	9	INC	6	PSP/Independents	1 / 2
1962	3rd	INC/PSP/IUML	8	CPI	6	RSP/ Independents	1 / 3
1967	4th	United Front	17	INC	1	Independents	1
1971	5th	United Front	16	CPI(M)	2	Independents	1
1977	6th	United Front	20	CPI(M)	0		0
1980	7th	LDF	12	UDF	8		0
1984	8th	UDF	18	LDF	2		0
1989	9th	UDF	17	LDF	3		0
1991	10th	UDF	15	LDF	5		0
1996	11th	UDF	10	LDF	10		0
1998	12th	UDF	11	LDF	9		0
1999	13th	UDF	11	LDF	9		0
2004	14th	LDF	18	UDF	1	NDA	1
2009	15th	UDF	16	LDF	4		0
2014	16th	UDF	12	LDF	8		0
2019	17th	UDF	19	LDF	1		0
2024	18th	UDF	18	LDF	1	BJP	1

== State Legislative Assembly elections ==
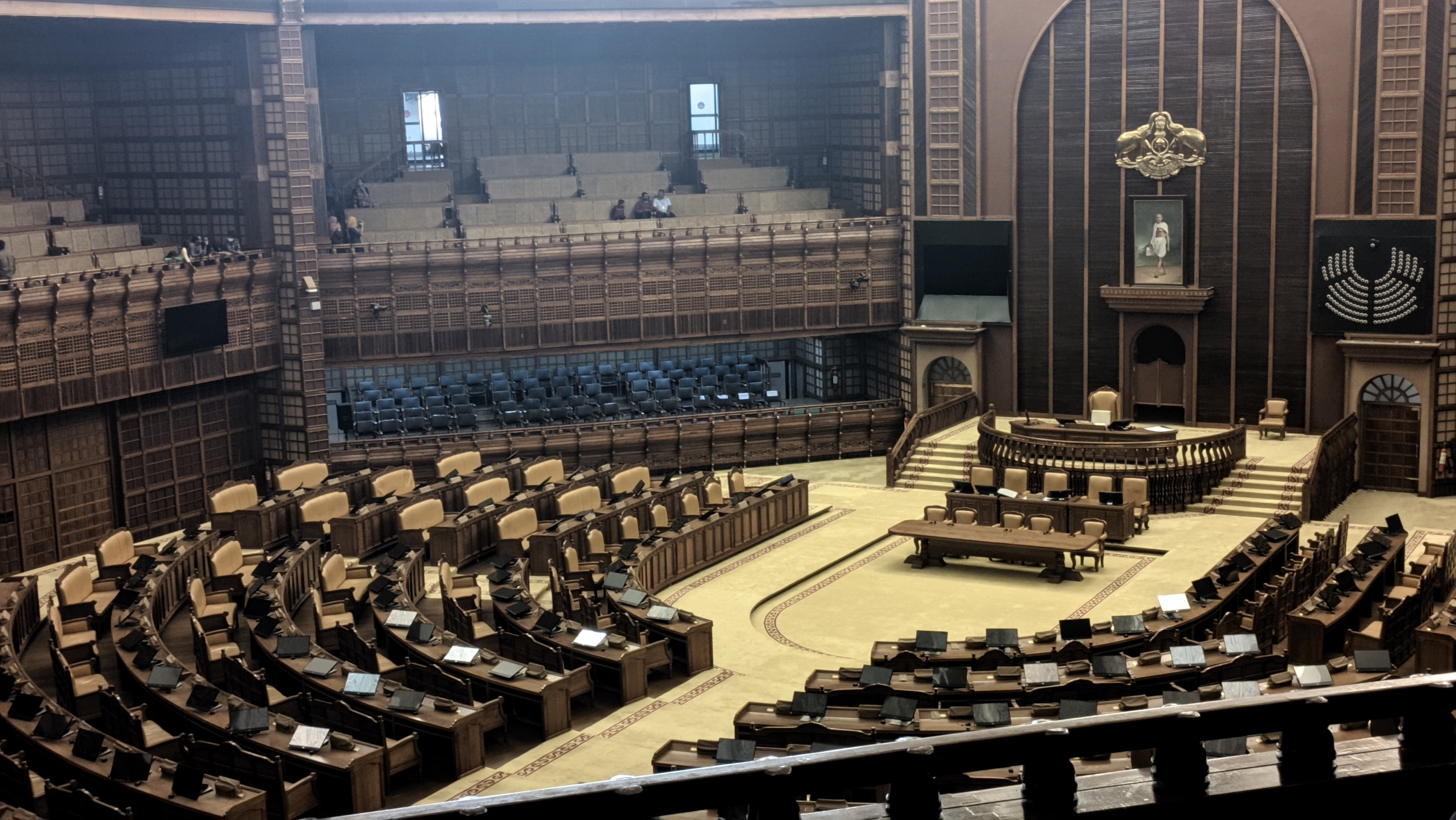
Kerala Legislative Assembly (State assembly)

Members of the Kerala Legislative Assembly are directly elected by being voted upon by all adult citizens of the state from a set of candidates who stand in their respective constituencies. Every adult citizen of Kerala can vote only in their constituency. Candidates who win the legislative assembly elections are called "Members of the Legislative Assembly" and hold their seats for five years or until the body is dissolved by the governor of Kerala on the advice of the council of ministers. The house meets in the Assembly Chamber of the Chief Secretariat in Thiruvananthapuram on matters relating to the creation of new laws or removing or improving the existing laws that affect all citizens of Kerala. Elections take place once every five years to elect 140 members to the legislative assembly. The leader of the majority party or alliance takes oath as chief minister of Kerala.

Year	Election	Chief Minister	Ruling Party
1957	1st Assembly	E. M. S. Namboodiripad	Communist Party of India
1962	2nd Assembly	Pattom A. Thanu Pillai	Praja Socialist Party
1965	No Majority		No party won a majority
1967	3rd Assembly	E. M. S. Namboodiripad	Communist Party of India
1971	4th Assembly	C. Achutha Menon	Communist Party of India
1977	5th Assembly	K. Karunakaran	Indian National Congress
1980	6th Assembly	E. K. Nayanar	Communist Party of India
1982	7th Assembly	K. Karunakaran	Indian National Congress
1987	8th Assembly	E. K. Nayanar	Communist Party of India
1991	9th Assembly	K. Karunakaran	Indian National Congress
1996	10th Assembly	E. K. Nayanar	Communist Party of India
2001	11th Assembly	A. K. Antony	Indian National Congress
2006	12th Assembly	V. S. Achuthanandan	Communist Party of India
2011	13th Assembly	Oommen Chandy	Indian National Congress
2016	14th Assembly	Pinarayi Vijayan	Communist Party of India
2021	15th Assembly	Pinarayi Vijayan	Communist Party of India
2026	16th Assembly	V. D. Satheesan	Indian National Congress

=== Party wise election results ===
Legislative Assembly election results
13th Assembly (2011)	14th Assembly (2016)	15th Assembly (2021)	16th Assembly (2026)

State-level elections are held to fill the Kerala Legislative Assembly. The latest Assembly elections were held on 6 April 2021.

Election Year	1st Party		2nd Party		3rd Party		4th Party		Others	Total Seats
Election Year	Party	Seats	Party	Seats	Party	Seats	Party	Seats	Others	Total Seats
1957	Communist Party of India	60	Indian National Congress	43	Praja Socialist Party	9			14	126
1960	Indian National Congress	63	Communist Party of India	29	Praja Socialist Party	20	Indian Union Muslim League	11	3	126
1965	Communist Party of India (Marxist)	40	Indian National Congress	36	Kerala Congress	23	Samyukta Socialist Party	13	21	133
1967	Communist Party of India (Marxist)	52	Communist Party of India	19	Samyukta Socialist Party	19	Indian Union Muslim League	14	29	133
1970	Indian National Congress	30	Communist Party of India (Marxist)	29	Communist Party of India	16	Kerala Congress	12	46	133
1977	Indian National Congress	38	Communist Party of India	23	Kerala Congress	20	Communist Party of India (Marxist)	17	42	140
1980	Communist Party of India (Marxist)	35	Indian National Congress (U)	21	Communist Party of India	17	Indian National Congress (I)	17	50	140
1982	Communist Party of India (Marxist)	28	Indian National Congress (I)	20	Congress (A)	15	Indian Union Muslim League	14	63	140
1987	Communist Party of India (Marxist)	38	Indian National Congress	33	Communist Party of India	16	Indian Union Muslim League	15	38	140
1991	Indian National Congress	55	Communist Party of India (Marxist)	28	Indian Union Muslim League	19	Communist Party of India	12	26	140
1996	Communist Party of India (Marxist)	40	Indian National Congress	37	Communist Party of India	18	Indian Union Muslim League	13	32	140
2001	Indian National Congress	63	Communist Party of India (Marxist)	24	Indian Union Muslim League	16	Kerala Congress (M)	9	28	140
2006	Communist Party of India (Marxist)	61	Indian National Congress	24	Communist Party of India	17	Indian Union Muslim League	7	31	140
2011	Communist Party of India (Marxist)	44	Indian National Congress	39	Indian Union Muslim League	20	Communist Party of India	13	24	140
2016	Communist Party of India (Marxist)	58	Indian National Congress	22	Communist Party of India	19	Indian Union Muslim League	18	23	140
2021	Communist Party of India (Marxist)	62	Indian National Congress	21	Communist Party of India	17	Indian Union Muslim League	15	25	140
2026	Indian National Congress	63	Communist Party of India (Marxist)	26	Indian Union Muslim League	22	Communist Party of India	8	21	140

=== Alliance wise results ===
Winning Party / Coalition	Seats won	Opposition party/ Coalition	Seats won	Other party/ Coalition	Seats won	Others	Chief Minister (Party)	
1957 Kerala Legislative Assembly election
Communist Party of India (CPI)	60	Indian National Congress (INC)	43	—		9	E. M. S. Namboodiripad (CPI)	
Independent	5	Praja Socialist Party (PSP)	9	—		9	E. M. S. Namboodiripad (CPI)	
1960 Kerala Legislative Assembly election
Praja Socialist Party (PSP)	20	Communist Party of India (CPI)	29	—		3	Pattom Thanu Pillai (PSP)	
Indian National Congress (INC)	63	Communist Party of India (CPI)	29	—		3	Pattom Thanu Pillai (PSP)	
Indian Union Muslim League (IUML)	12	Communist Party of India (CPI)	29	—		3	Pattom Thanu Pillai (PSP)	
1965 Kerala Legislative Assembly election
President's Rule; No single party could form a ministry commanding majority and hence this election is considered abortive.
1967 Kerala Legislative Assembly election
Communist Party of India (Marxist) (CPI(M))	52	Indian National Congress (INC)	9	—		15	E. M. S. Namboodiripad (CPI(M))	
Communist Party of India (CPI)	19	Indian National Congress (INC)	9	—		15	E. M. S. Namboodiripad (CPI(M))	
Samyukta Socialist Party (SSP)	19	Kerala Congress (KC)	5	—		15	E. M. S. Namboodiripad (CPI(M))	
Indian Union Muslim League (IUML)	14	Kerala Congress (KC)	5	—		15	E. M. S. Namboodiripad (CPI(M))	
1970 Kerala Legislative Assembly election
Communist Party of India (CPI)	16	Communist Party of India (Marxist) (CPI(M))	29	—		19	C. Achutha Menon (CPI)	
Indian National Congress (INC)	30	Communist Party of India (Marxist) (CPI(M))	29	—		19	C. Achutha Menon (CPI)	
Kerala Congress (KC)	12	Communist Party of India (Marxist) (CPI(M))	29	—		19	C. Achutha Menon (CPI)	
Indian Union Muslim League (IUML)	11	Communist Party of India (Marxist) (CPI(M))	29	—		19	C. Achutha Menon (CPI)	
Revolutionary Socialist Party (RSP)	6	Communist Party of India (Marxist) (CPI(M))	29	—		19	C. Achutha Menon (CPI)	
Praja Socialist Party (PSP)	3	Communist Party of India (Marxist) (CPI(M))	29	—		19	C. Achutha Menon (CPI)	
Socialist Party (SP)	1	Communist Party of India (Marxist) (CPI(M))	29	—		19	C. Achutha Menon (CPI)	
1977 Kerala Legislative Assembly election
Indian National Congress (INC)	38	Communist Party of India (Marxist) (CPI(M))	17	—		0	K. Karunakaran (INC)	
Communist Party of India (CPI)	23	Communist Party of India (Marxist) (CPI(M))	17	—		0	K. Karunakaran (INC)	
Kerala Congress (KC)	20	Bharatiya Lok Dal (BLD)	6	—		0	K. Karunakaran (INC)	
Indian Union Muslim League (IUML)	13	All India Muslim League (AIML)	3	—		0	K. Karunakaran (INC)	
Revolutionary Socialist Party (RSP)	9	Kerala Congress (B) (KC(B))	6	—		0	K. Karunakaran (INC)	
Independents	8	Independents	1	—		0	K. Karunakaran (INC)	
1980 Kerala Legislative Assembly election
Left Democratic Front	93	United Democratic Front	46	—		0	E. K. Nayanar; CPI(M)	
Communist Party of India (Marxist) (CPI(M))	35	Indian National Congress (INC)	17	—		0	E. K. Nayanar; CPI(M)	
Communist Party of India (CPI)	17	Indian Union Muslim League (IUML)	14	—		0	E. K. Nayanar; CPI(M)	
Indian National Congress (U) (INC(U))	21	Kerala Congress (Jacob) (KC(J))	6	—		0	E. K. Nayanar; CPI(M)	
Kerala Congress (B) (KC(B))	1	Janata Party (JP)	5	—		0	E. K. Nayanar; CPI(M)	
Kerala Congress (M) (KC(M))	8	Praja Socialist Party (PSP)	1	—		0	E. K. Nayanar; CPI(M)	
Revolutionary Socialist Party (RSP)	6	Independents	4	—		0	E. K. Nayanar; CPI(M)	
All India Muslim League (AIML)	5	Independents	4	—		0	E. K. Nayanar; CPI(M)	
1982 Kerala Legislative Assembly election
United Democratic Front	77	Left Democratic Front	63	—		0	K. Karunakaran; INC	
1987 Kerala Legislative Assembly election
Left Democratic Front	78	United Democratic Front	61	—		1	E. K. Nayanar; CPI(M)	
								1991 Kerala Legislative Assembly election
United Democratic Front	90	Left Democratic Front	48	—		2	K. Karunakaran; INC	
1996 Kerala Legislative Assembly election
Left Democratic Front	80	United Democratic Front	59	—		1	E. K. Nayanar; CPI(M)	
2001 Kerala Legislative Assembly election
United Democratic Front	99	Left Democratic Front	40	—		1	A. K. Antony; INC	
2006 Kerala Legislative Assembly election
Left Democratic Front	98	United Democratic Front	42	—		0	V. S. Achuthanandan; CPI(M)	
2011 Kerala Legislative Assembly election
United Democratic Front	72	Left Democratic Front	68	—		1	Oommen Chandy; INC	
Indian National Congress	38	Communist Party of India (Marxist)	45	—		1	Oommen Chandy; INC	
Indian Union Muslim League	20	Communist Party of India	13	—		1	Oommen Chandy; INC	
Kerala Congress (M)	9	Janata Dal (Secular)	4	—		1	Oommen Chandy; INC	
Socialist Janata (Democratic)	2	Independents	2	—		1	Oommen Chandy; INC	
Kerala Congress (B)	1	Nationalist Congress Party	2	—		1	Oommen Chandy; INC	
Kerala Congress (Jacob)	1	Revolutionary Marxist Party of India	2	—		1	Oommen Chandy; INC	
2016 Kerala Legislative Assembly election
Left Democratic Front	91	United Democratic Front	47	National Democratic Alliance	1	1	Pinarayi Vijayan; CPI(M)	
Communist Party of India (Marxist)	58	Indian National Congress	22	Bharatiya Janata Party	1	1	Pinarayi Vijayan; CPI(M)	
Communist Party of India	19	Indian Union Muslim League	18			1	Pinarayi Vijayan; CPI(M)	
Janata Dal (Secular)	3	Kerala Congress (M)	6			1	Pinarayi Vijayan; CPI(M)	
Nationalist Congress Party	2	Kerala Congress (Jacob)	1			1	Pinarayi Vijayan; CPI(M)	
Independents	5					1	Pinarayi Vijayan; CPI(M)	
Congress (Secular)	1					1	Pinarayi Vijayan; CPI(M)	
Kerala Congress (B)	1					1	Pinarayi Vijayan; CPI(M)	
National Secular Conference	1					1	Pinarayi Vijayan; CPI(M)	
Communist Marxist Party	1					1	Pinarayi Vijayan; CPI(M)	
2026 Kerala Legislative Assembly election
United Democratic Front	102	Left Democratic Front	35	National Democratic Alliance	3	0	V.D. Satheesan; INC	
Indian National Congress	63	Communist Party of India (Marxist)	26	Bharatiya Janata Party	3	0	V.D. Satheesan; INC	
Indian Union Muslim League	22	Communist Party of India	8			0	V.D. Satheesan; INC	
Kerala Congress	7	Rashtriya Janata Dal	1			0	V.D. Satheesan; INC	
Revolutionary Socialist Party	3					0	V.D. Satheesan; INC	
Kerala Congress (Jacob)	1					0	V.D. Satheesan; INC	
Revolutionary Marxist Party of India	1					0	V.D. Satheesan; INC	
Communist Marxist Party	1					0	V.D. Satheesan; INC	
IND	4					0	V.D. Satheesan; INC	

=== List of political alliances of Kerala in power (1980–present) ===
No.	Flag	Political alliance	Total days in governance
1		Left Democratic Front (LDF)	9661 days
2		United Democratic Front (UDF)	7,295 days

== Local Body elections ==
The elections for local self-government institutions, such as panchayats and municipalities, are conducted by the Kerala State Election Commission, which is an independent constitutional authority.

Panchayat Elections is a term widely used in Kerala, India, for the polls that are held to select the Local Self-government Representatives. There are three branches of local self-government institutions in Kerala, officially known as Panchayati Raj Institutions, responsible for rural governance. They are Grama Panchayat which can be translated as Village Government, Block Panchayat and District Panchayat. A Grama Panchayat is almost an equivalent to City administration and, Block Panchayat is for a rural block (which includes several gram panchayats) District Panchayat to a County (excluding statutory cities and towns).

There are two more wings namely Municipality which is the urban local government that exists only in major towns and Municipal Corporations that come only in six major cities. Consequent to the 73rd Amendment to the Constitution of India, the local self-government institutions (LSGIs) are to function as the third tier of government.

At present, there are 1200 local governments in Kerala, which includes 941 Grama Panchayats, 152 Block Panchayats, 14 District Panchayats, 87 Municipalities and 6 Municipal Corporations.

The last Election to the Local Self-government Institutions in Kerala (Panchayat Elections) was held in 2025 december. The results were announced on 13 december 2025. Next local body elections are scheduled to be held in 2030.

Year	Municipal Corporation Results				Total
Year	LDF	UDF	NDA	OTH	Total
2025	1	4	1	0	6
2020	5	1	0	0	6
2015	4	2	0	0	6
2010	3	2	0	0	5

Year	Municipalities Results				Total
Year	LDF	UDF	NDA	OTH	Total
2025	28	54	2	0	87
2020	43	41	2	0	87
2015	44	41	1	0	87
2010	20	39	0	0	59

Year	District Panchayat Results				Total
Year	LDF	UDF	NDA	OTH	Total
2025	7	7	0	0	14
2020	11	3	0	0	14
2015	7	7	0	0	14
2010	6	8	0	0	14

Year	Block Panchayat Results				Total
Year	LDF	UDF	NDA	OTH	Total
2025	63	79	0	6	152
2020	108	38	0	0	152
2015	90	61	0	1	152

Year	Gram Panchayat Results				Total
Year	LDF	UDF	NDA	OTH	Total
2025	340	505	26	6	941
2020	514	321	19	23	941
2015	549	365	14	13	941

== See also ==
- Politics of Kerala
- Political parties in Kerala
- Left Democratic Front
- United Democratic Front (Kerala)
