= 2025 Kerala local elections =

Local government elections in Kerala, India

- 9–11 December 2025

1199 of 1200 local bodies in Kerala (Note: Mattanur municipality elections are held in a different cycle, hence elections to this municipality are not held in 2025.)
- Turnout: 73.69% (▼2.51%)
Alliance	UDF	LDF	NDA
Percentage	38.81%	33.45%	14.71%
Swing	(▲2.8%)	(▼4.5%)	(▼0.29%)
Grama Panchayat	505	340	26
Block Panchayat	79	63	00
District Panchayat	07	07	00
Municipality	54	28	02
Corporation	04	01	01
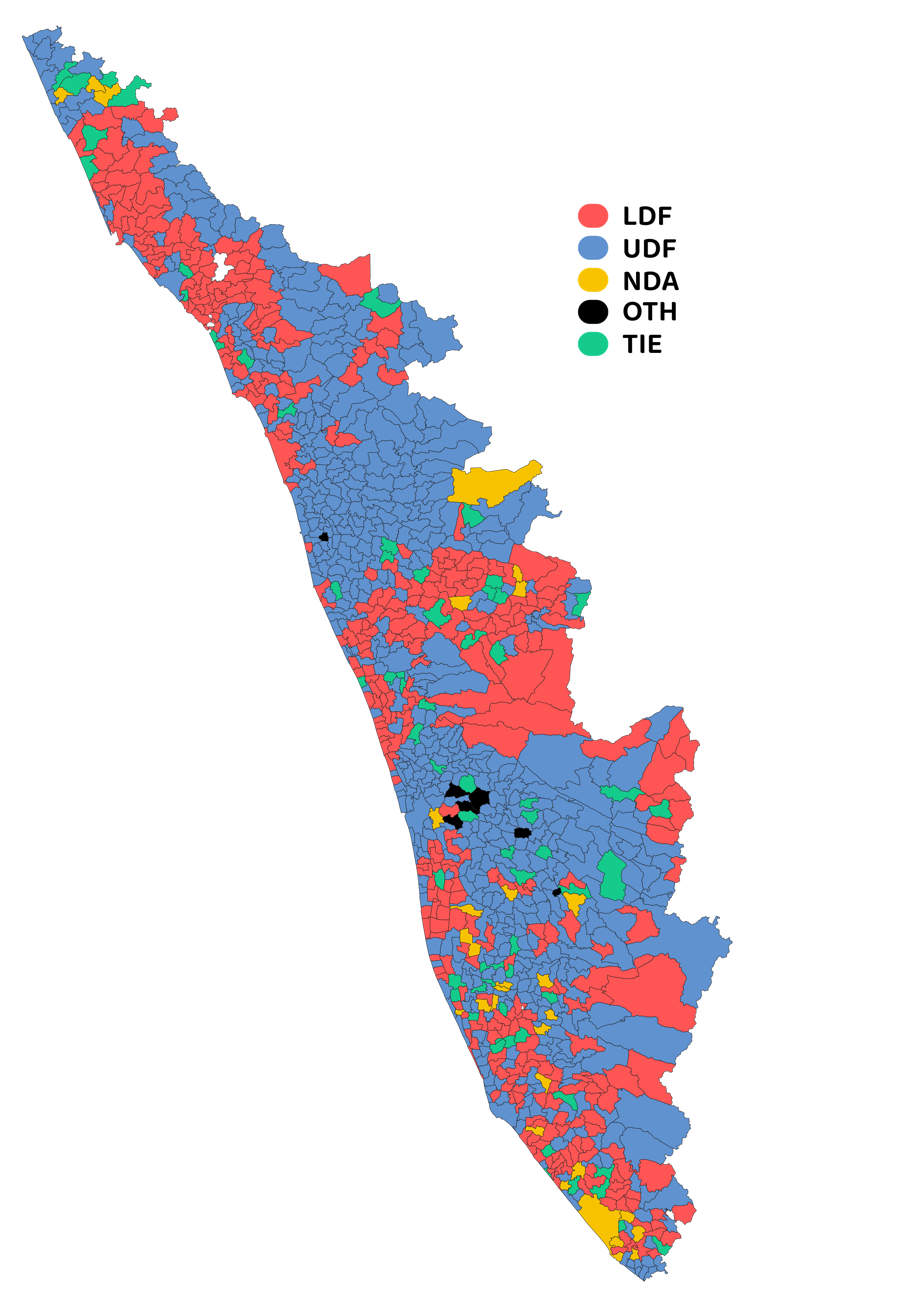
- 2025 Kerala local elections results

Elections to local governments (Panchayats, Municipalities and Corporations) in Kerala were held on 9 December 2025 and 11 December 2025 in 2 phases. Results were announced on 13 December 2025 through the Kerala State Election Commission's official results portal after conclusion of counting.

The State Election Commission, Kerala had completed preparatory processes, including finalising electoral rolls, delimitation of wards, and scheduling. According to the final voter's list published by the Kerala State Election Commission, the State had a total of 2,84,30,761 registered voters.

== Background ==
Local body elections in Kerala are held every five years to elect members to grama, block, and district panchayats, as well as municipalities and municipal corporations. The 2020 Kerala local elections were held in December 2020, resulting in a decisive victory for the LDF.

== Ward delimitation 2025 ==
In preparation for the 2025 Kerala local body elections, the state undertook a ward delimitation exercise based on the 2011 Census. As a result, the total number of wards across local self-government institutions increased from 21,900 to 23,612, adding 1,712 new. The exercise was carried out by a Delimitation Commission, Kerala headed by State Election Commissioner A. Shajahan and covered all districts of the state. Public hearings were held before issuing the final notifications between May and July 2025.

The number of wards in the state’s 87 municipalities increased from 3,113 to 3,241, while the six municipal corporations saw an increase from 414 to 421 wards. In the 941 grama panchayats, the total number of wards rose from 15,962 to 17,337. The 152 block panchayats recorded an increase from 2,080 to 2,267 wards, and the 14 district panchayats now have 346 wards, up from the previous 331.

== Schedule ==
The State Election Commission held the polling in 2 phases in December 2025. The first phase was held on December 9 for the districts of Thiruvananthapuram, Kollam, Pathanamthitta, Kottayam, Idukki, Alappuzha and Ernakulam; The second phase was then held on December 11 for the districts of Thrissur, Malappuram, Wayanad, Palakkad, Kannur, Kasaragod, and Kozhikode. District administrations released preliminary notifications regarding reservation draws, ward delimitations, and procurement for polling materials.

== Voter rolls ==
The SEC has undertaken summary revision of electoral rolls with house-to-house enumeration and verification of entries. Political parties have raised concerns regarding alleged duplication of entries and have submitted complaints to district collectors and the SEC.

In July 2025, voter list was published listing 2,66,78,256 registered voters—of whom 1,40,45,837 were women, 1,26,32,186 men and 233 transgender voters. After summary revision and disposal of claims and objections, the final voters’ list was published in September 2025, showing a total of 2,83,12,472 voters—an increase of 16.34 lakh over the draft list. The SEC allowed new voter applications and corrections until 12 August 2025, following which the rolls were frozen for the conduct of elections. The complete electoral roll can be accessed on the SEC’s official voter-search portal.

== Parties and coalitions ==
The main political alliances contesting the elections were expected to be:

- The Left Democratic Front (LDF), led by the Communist Party of India (Marxist) (CPI(M)) and including the Communist Party of India (CPI), Kerala Congress (M), JD(S) (Thomas Faction), NCP (SP), Congress (Secular), and several smaller left-aligned groups.
- The United Democratic Front (UDF), led by the INC and including the IUML, Kerala Congress factions such as KC(Jacob), RSP, and CMP(J).
- The National Democratic Alliance (NDA), led by the BJP and including the BDJS, Kerala Kamaraj Congress and allied regional partners.

In addition, several minor and independent parties also fielded candidates in various wards, including the SDPI, Welfare Party of India, Aam Aadmi Party, and Twenty20, a civic platform based in Kizhakkambalam. Independents and local issue-based collectives were also expected to contest extensively across the state.

== Conduct ==
The Kerala State Election Commission had released administrative circulars related to polling arrangements, counting centres, and electronic publication of trends and results through the TREND 2025 portal.

== Results ==
Results were published by the SEC on its official portal after counting. This is a summary of the outcome.

=== Vote share ===
The following table summarizes the party-wise vote share and total votes polled across the four primary tiers of local self-government in Kerala. The 2025 elections saw a significant shift, with the United Democratic Front (UDF) emerging as the largest alliance in terms of total vote percentage across all segments.

=== Consolidated Vote Share by Local Body Tier (2025) ===
Alliance	Corporations	Municipalities	Grama Panchayats	District Panchayats	Total Vote Share (Statewide)
UDF	35.51%	39.07%	39.15%	42.01%	38.81%
LDF	33.63%	29.63%	34.51%	38.66%	33.45%
NDA	22.60%	14.29%	13.73%	15.66%	14.71%
Others	8.25%	17.01%	12.61%	3.67%	13.03%

Vote share
1. UDF (38.8%)
2. LDF (33.5%)
3. NDA (14.7%)
4. Others (13.0%)

=== Local body wise ===
==== Seat share ====
Seat Share in Grama Panchayats (By alliance)
1. UDF (63.7%)
2. LDF (27.1%)
3. NDA (2.76%)
4. Others (7.45%)
Seat Share in Block Panchayats (By alliance)
1. UDF (52.0%)
2. LDF (41.4%)
3. Others (6.59%)
Seat Share in District Panchayats (By alliance)
1. UDF (50.0%)
2. LDF (50.0%)
Seat Share in Municipalities (By alliance)
1. UDF (62.8%)
2. LDF (32.5%)
3. NDA (2.32%)
4. Others (2.37%)
Seat Share in Corporations (By alliance)
1. UDF (66.7%)
2. LDF (16.7%)
3. NDA (16.7%)

==== Vote share ====
Vote Share in Grama Panchayats (By alliance)
1. UDF (39.1%)
2. LDF (34.5%)
3. NDA (13.7%)
4. Others (12.6%)
Vote Share in District Panchayats (By alliance)
1. UDF (42.0%)
2. LDF (38.7%)
3. NDA (15.7%)
4. Others (3.67%)
Vote Share in Municipalities (By alliance)
1. UDF (39.1%)
2. LDF (29.6%)
3. NDA (14.3%)
4. Others (17.0%)
Vote Share in Municipality Corporation (By alliance)
1. UDF (35.3%)
2. LDF (33.6%)
3. NDA (22.6%)
4. Others (8.25%)
Vote Share in elections (By alliance)
1. UDF (38.8%)
2. LDF (33.5%)
3. NDA (14.7%)
4. Others (13.0%)

=== Summary ===
2025 Kerala local body elections
Local self-government body	Local Bodies in lead					Total
Local self-government body	UDF	LDF	NDA	Others	Tie	Total
Grama Panchayats	505 (▲184)	340 (▼174)	26 (▲7)	6	64	941
Block Panchayats	79 (▲41)	63 (▼45)	0	0	10	152
District Panchayats	7 (▲4)	7 (▼4)	0	0	0	14
Municipalities	54 (▲13)	28 (▼15)	2	1 (▲1)	1	86
Corporations	4 (▲3)	1 (▼4)	1 (▲1)	0	0	6

=== Ward-wise ===
Local self-government body	Wards in lead				Total
Local self-government body	UDF	LDF	NDA	Others	Total
Grama Panchayats	8,021 (▲2,128)	6,568 (▼694)	1,447 (▲265)	1,299 (▼321)	17,337
Block Panchayats	1241 (▲514)	923 (▼343)	54 (▲17)	49	2267
District Panchayats	195 (▲85)	149 (▼63)	1 (▼1)	1 (▼5)	346
Municipalities	1,458 (▲286)	1,100 (▼67)	324 (▲4)	323 (▼93)	3,205
Corporations	187 (▲67)	125 (▼82)	93 (▲33)	15 (▼12)	346

=== Municipal Corporations ===
Municipal Corporations
Corporation	Wards won				Total	Alliance in majority (2020)	Alliance in majority (2025)	Result/Aftermath
Corporation	UDF	LDF	NDA	Others	Total	Alliance in majority (2020)	Alliance in majority (2025)	Result/Aftermath
Kannur	36 (▲2)	15 (▼4)	4 (▲3)	1	56	UDF	UDF	UDF Government
Kochi	47 (▲16)	20 (▼14)	6 (▲1)	3 (▼1)	76	LDF	UDF	UDF Government
Kollam	27 (▲18)	16 (▼23)	12 (▲6)	1	56	LDF	UDF	UDF Government
Kozhikode	28 (▲11)	35 (▼16)	13 (▲6)	3 (▲3)	76	LDF	LDF	LDF Government
Thiruvananthapuram	20 (▲10)	29 (▼24)	50 (▲15)	2 (▼1)	101 (Note: Elections to ward 66-Vizhinjam were postponed due to the death of a candidate.)	LDF	NDA	NDA Government
Thrissur	33 (▲9)	11 (▼13)	8 (▲2)	4 (▲3)	56	Hung/LDF (Note: LDF later won mayorship over the corporation with support from independent members)	UDF	UDF Government

Seats Won by Other Parties

The Aam Aadmi Party has opened its account in Kerala by winning 3 seats in the Kerala local body elections, all secured by women candidates.

In Aikaranadu Grama Panchayat, Twenty20 won all 16 wards while in Kizhakkambalam Grama Panchayat, it won 14 of 21 wards and retained that panchayat. In Thiruvaniyoor, it secured 9 of 18 wards. Though Twenty20 lost control of some of its previously held panchayats such as Mazhuvannoor and Kunnathunad, they have won seats in a few other panchayat wards (e.g., Poothrikka, Vengola, Manakkad). It also one 3 divisions in Vazhakulam Block Panchayat.

Seats won by Alliances across wards

=== United Democratic Front (UDF) ===
1. Indian National Congress: 7826
2. Indian Union Muslim League: 2850
3. Kerala Congress: 332
4. Revolutionary Socialist Party: 57
5. Kerala Congress (Jacob): 34
6. Revolutionary Marxist Party of India: 29
7. Communist Marxist Party Central Council (CP John faction): 10
8. Kerala Democratic Party: 8
9. Bharatiya National Janata Dal: 3
10. All India Forward Bloc: 1

=== Left Democratic Front (LDF) ===
1. Communist Party of India (Marxist): 7475
2. Communist Party of India: 1019
3. Kerala Congress (M): 246
4. Rashtriya Janata Dal: 63
5. Janata Dal (Secular): 44
6. Nationalist Congress Party - Sharadchandra Pawar: 25
7. Kerala Congress (B): 15
8. Indian National League: 10
9. National Secular Conference: 9
10. Congress (Secular): 8
11. Janadhipathya Kerala Congress: 6

=== National Democratic Alliance (NDA) ===
1. Bharatiya Janata Party: 1914
2. Twenty 20 Party: 78
3. Bharath Dharma Jana Sena: 5
4. Lok Janshakthi Party: 1

=== Others ===
1. Social Democratic Party of India: 97
2. Welfare Party of India: 31
3. Peoples Democratic Party: 5
4. Aam Aadmi Party: 3
5. Bahujan Samaj Party: 3
6. Samajwadi Party: 1
7. Independents: 1403

=== District wise results ===
The following are the district-wise local body election results based on majority:

District	Alliance	Gram Panchayats	Block Panchayats	District Panchayats	Municipalities	Corporations
Thiruvananthapuram	Total	38	8	1	2	1
Thiruvananthapuram	LDF	21	4	1	2	0
Thiruvananthapuram	UDF	16	4	0	0	0
Thiruvananthapuram	NDA	1	0	0	0	1
Kollam	Total	35	9	1	4	0
Kollam	LDF	18	6	1	3	0
Kollam	UDF	17	3	0	1	0
Kollam	NDA	0	0	0	0	0
Pathanamthitta	Total	28	7	1	2	0
Pathanamthitta	LDF	6	0	0	0	0
Pathanamthitta	UDF	21	7	1	2	0
Pathanamthitta	NDA	1	0	0	0	0
Alappuzha	Total	32	10	1	3	0
Alappuzha	LDF	21	6	1	1	0
Alappuzha	UDF	11	4	0	2	0
Alappuzha	NDA	0	0	0	0	0
Kottayam	Total	36	1	2	0	
Kottayam	LDF	10	2	0	0	0
Kottayam	UDF	26	9	1	2	0
Kottayam	NDA	0	0	0	0	0
Idukki	Total	42	8	1	1	0
Idukki	LDF	10	1	0	0	0
Idukki	UDF	32	7	1	1	0
Idukki	NDA	0	0	0	0	0
Ernakulam	Total	62	13	1	8	1
Ernakulam	LDF	3	1	0	0	0
Ernakulam	UDF	57	12	1	8	1
Ernakulam	NDA	0	0	0	0	0
Ernakulam	Others	2	0	0	0	0
Thrissur	Total	55	11	1	5	1
Thrissur	LDF	30	8	1	3	0
Thrissur	UDF	24	3	0	2	1
Thrissur	NDA	1	0	0	0	0
Palakkad	Total	59	12	1	3	0
Palakkad	LDF	37	9	1	0	0
Palakkad	UDF	20	3	0	3	0
Palakkad	NDA	2	0	0	0	0
Malappuram	Total	82	14	1	11	0
Malappuram	LDF	2	0	0	1	0
Malappuram	UDF	79	14	1	10	0
Malappuram	NDA	0	0	0	0	0
Malappuram	Others	1	0	0	0	0
Kozhikode	Total	52	8	0	5	0
Kozhikode	LDF	21	6	0	1	0
Kozhikode	UDF	31	2	0	4	0
Kozhikode	NDA	0	0	0	0	0
Wayanad	Total	17	4	1	2	0
Wayanad	LDF	3	0	0	1	0
Wayanad	UDF	14	4	1	2	0
Wayanad	NDA	0	0	0	0	0
Kannur	Total	67	9	1	6	1
Kannur	LDF	47	8	1	4	0
Kannur	UDF	20	1	0	2	1
Kannur	NDA	0	0	0	0	0
Kasaragod	Total	25	6	0	2	0
Kasaragod	LDF	10	4	0	1	0
Kasaragod	UDF	14	2	0	1	0
Kasaragod	NDA	1	0	0	0	0

== Post Election shifts ==
In Udma Grama Panchayat in Kasaragod, LDF won the presidency throw a draw of lots, despite the UDF winning 12 of 23 seats, because an invalid ballot vote from UDF camp, which resulted in a tie. In July 2026, UDF regained the presidency through a no-confidence motion. Similar situation happened in Muppainad Grama Panchayat in Wayanad, where LDF won back the presidency through a no-confidence motion. In the Erumeli Grama Panchayat in Kottayam, the LDF won the presidency despite winning 14 of 24 seats as the seat was reserved for Scheduled Caste candidate and UDF had none.

In Moonnilavu Grama Panchayat in Kottayam, UDF gain presidency through a no-confidence motion in which Kerala Congress (Joseph) member cross voted.

In 2 panchayats, NDA presidency was removed via cross party support from UDF and LDF: Narananganam Grama Panchayat in Pathanamthitta where LDF took presidency in August 2026 and Paralam Grama Panchayat in Thrissur where UDF won presidency in September 2026.

== By-polls ==
By-elections were held to 38 wards and divisions across Kerala on 28 September 2026, with results declared on 29 September. The United Democratic Front (UDF) won 19 seats, while the Left Democratic Front (LDF) secured 18 seats. The National Democratic Alliance (NDA), which included Twenty 20 Party, retained their one seat meanwhile Bharatiya Janata Party (BJP) failed to win any seats. The by-elections recorded a voter turnout of 58.81%.

=== Results ===
Alliance	Seats contested	Seats won	Net change
UDF	38	19	▼3
LDF	38	18	▲3
NDA	38	1	Steady

== See also ==
- Elections in Kerala
- Local government in Kerala
- Elections in Kerala
- 2024 Indian general election in Kerala
- 2026 Kerala Legislative Assembly election
