= Politics of Kerala =

Political system of Kerala

Political System of Kerala
- Coat of arms of Kerala
- Polity type: State parliamentary representative democracy
- Constitution: Constitution of India
- Formation: 1950; 76 years ago

Legislative branch
- Name: Kerala Legislative Assembly
- Type: Unicameral
- Meeting place: Niyamasabha Mandiram, Thiruvananthapuram
- Presiding officer: Thiruvanchoor Radhakrishnan, Speaker of the Kerala Legislative Assembly
- Upper house
- Name: None
- Lower house
- Name: Kerala Legislative Assembly
- Presiding officer: Thiruvanchoor Radhakrishnan, Speaker

Executive branch
- Head of state
- Title: Governor
- Currently: Rajendra Vishwanath Arlekar
- Appointer: President of India (on the recommendation of Union Government of India)
- Head of government
- Title: Chief Minister
- Currently: V.D. Satheesan
- Appointer: Governor
- Cabinet
- Name: Kerala Council of Ministers
- Current cabinet: Satheesan ministry
- Leader: Chief Minister
- Appointer: Governor
- Headquarters: Kerala Government Secretariat, Thiruvananthapuram
- Ministries: 50 departments

Judicial branch
- Name: Judiciary of India
- Kerala High Court
- Chief judge: Nitin Madhukar Jamdar
- Seat: Kochi

Kerala is an Indian state, where federal legislative power is vested in the unicameral Kerala Legislative Assembly. The multilateral system has, since 1956, been dominated by the several pre-poll and post-poll alliances.

The judiciary of Kerala is independent of the executive and the legislature, while it is common for leading members of the executive (Kerala Council of Ministers) to be members of the legislature as well. The political system is laid out in the Constitution of India (1950).

Legislative Assembly has a membership of 140, where all 140 are elected. Kerala has 20 seats in the Lok Sabha (Indian Lower House) and nine seats in the Rajya Sabha (the Council of States). Elections are also held to choose representatives to the civic bodies at various levels within Kerala.

== Political parties ==
=== Alliances ===
Sl No	Alliance Name	Flag	Current Status
1	United Democratic Front (UDF)		Government
2	Left Democratic Front (LDF)		Opposition
3	National Democratic Alliance ( NDA )		None

=== National parties ===
Sl No	Party name	Symbol	Alliance	Current Status
1	Indian National Congress		UDF	Government
2	Communist Party of India (Marxist)	CPIM election symbol	LDF	Opposition
3	Bharatiya Janata Party	BJP election symbol	NDA	None

=== Recognised State Parties ===
Sr No	Party name	Symbol	Alliance
1	Communist Party of India (CPI)	CPIM election symbol	Left Democratic Front
2	Kerala Congress (M)		Left Democratic Front
3	Indian Socialist Janata Dal		Left Democratic Front
4	Nationalist Congress Party (Sharadchandra Pawar)		Left Democratic Front
5	Indian Union Muslim League	IUML election symbol	United Democratic Front
6	Revolutionary Socialist Party	RSP election symbol	United Democratic Front
7	Kerala Congress		United Democratic Front

== Electoral history ==
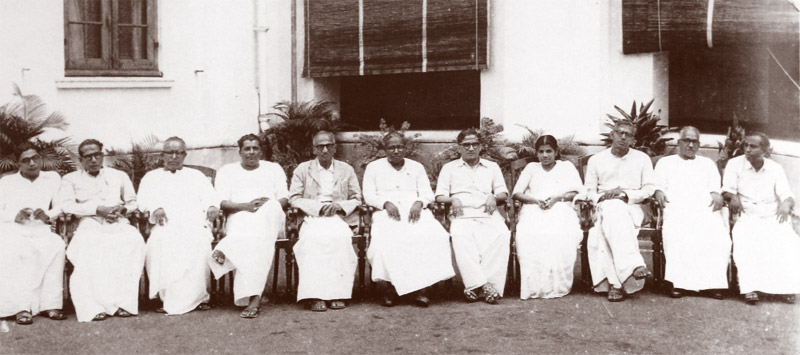
1st cabinet ministry of Kerala led by E. M. S. Namboodiripad (1957)

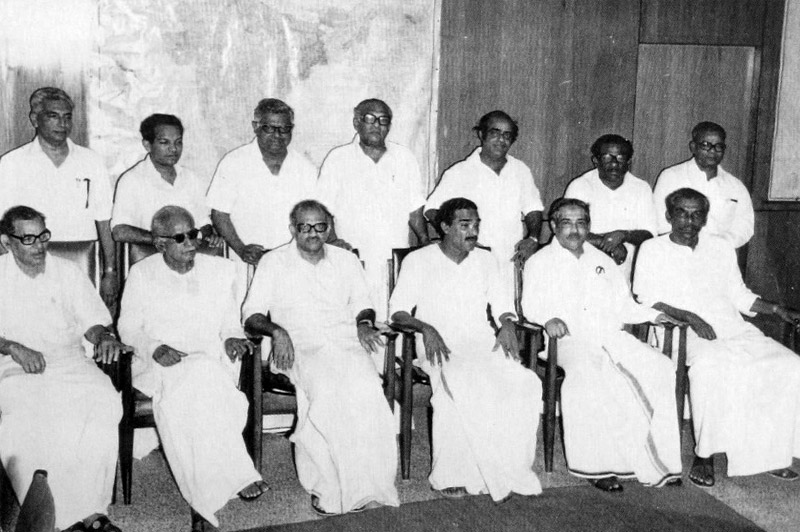
Kerala Council of Ministers under P. K. Vasudevan Nair (1978)

Results for the Kerala Legislative Assembly (from 1957) have been:

(Source)

Mandate	Seats secured		Ruling Coalition(s)
Mandate	CPI+	INC+	Ruling Coalition(s)
1957	65	43	CPI+
1960	29	95	INC+

Mandate	Seats secured		Ruling Coalition(s)
Mandate	CPI(M)	INC+	Ruling Coalition(s)
1965	40	36	No Government Formed
1967	117	9	CPI(M)+

Mandate	Seats secured			Ruling Coalition(s)
Mandate	CPI(M)+	CPI	INC	Ruling Coalition(s)
1970	29	16	30	CPI+INC
1977	29	23	38	CPI+INC

Mandate	Seats secured			Ruling Coalition	Majority
Mandate	LDF	UDF	Others	Ruling Coalition	Majority
1980	93	46	1	LDF	47
1982	63	77	0	UDF	14
1987	78	61	1	LDF	17
1991	48	90	2	UDF	40
1996	80	59	1	LDF	21
2001	40	99	1	UDF	59
2006	98	42	0	LDF	56
2011	68	72	0	UDF	04
2016	91	47	2	LDF	44
2021	99	41	0	LDF	58
2026	35	102	3	UDF	87

=== Current administrative structure by alliance ===
Current administrative structure by alliance in Kerala
National Constituencies	Total	LDF	UDF	Others
Lok Sabha constituencies	20	1	18	1
State Constituencies	Total	LDF	UDF	Others
Legislative assembly constituencies	140	35	102	3
Local self-government body	Total	LDF	UDF	Others
Municipal Corporations	6	1	4	1
District Panchayats	14	7	7	0
Municipalities	87	30	55	2
Block Panchayats	152	71	81	0
Grama Panchayats	941	367	550	24

== Popular vote ==
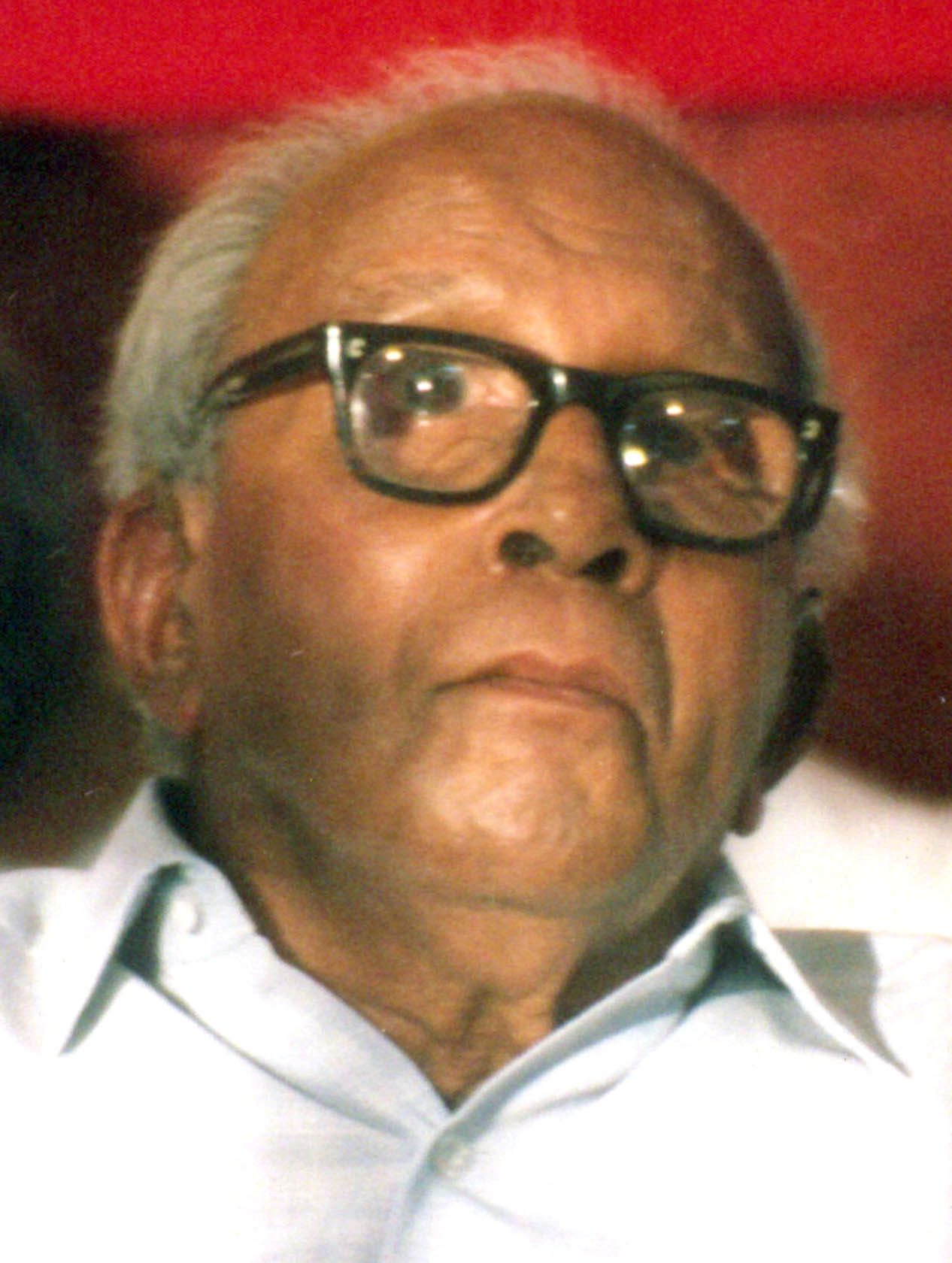
E. M. S. Namboodiripad, CPI (first Chief Minister of Kerala, 1957– 59)

1957 Assembly elections		2026 Assembly elections	
Parties	Popular vote %	Parties	Popular vote %
Indian National Congress (INC)	37.84	Indian National Congress (INC)	28.79
Communist Party of India (CPI)	35.28	Communist Party of India Marxist (CPIM)	21.77
Praja Socialist Party (PSP)	10.76	Bharatiya Janata Party (BJP)	14.20
Revolutionary Socialist Party (RSP)	3.22	Indian Union Muslim League (IUML)	11.01
		Communist Party of India (CPI)	6.6
		Kerala Congress (Mani) (KCM)	2.6
		Kerala Congress (KEC)	2.7

== Ideologies ==
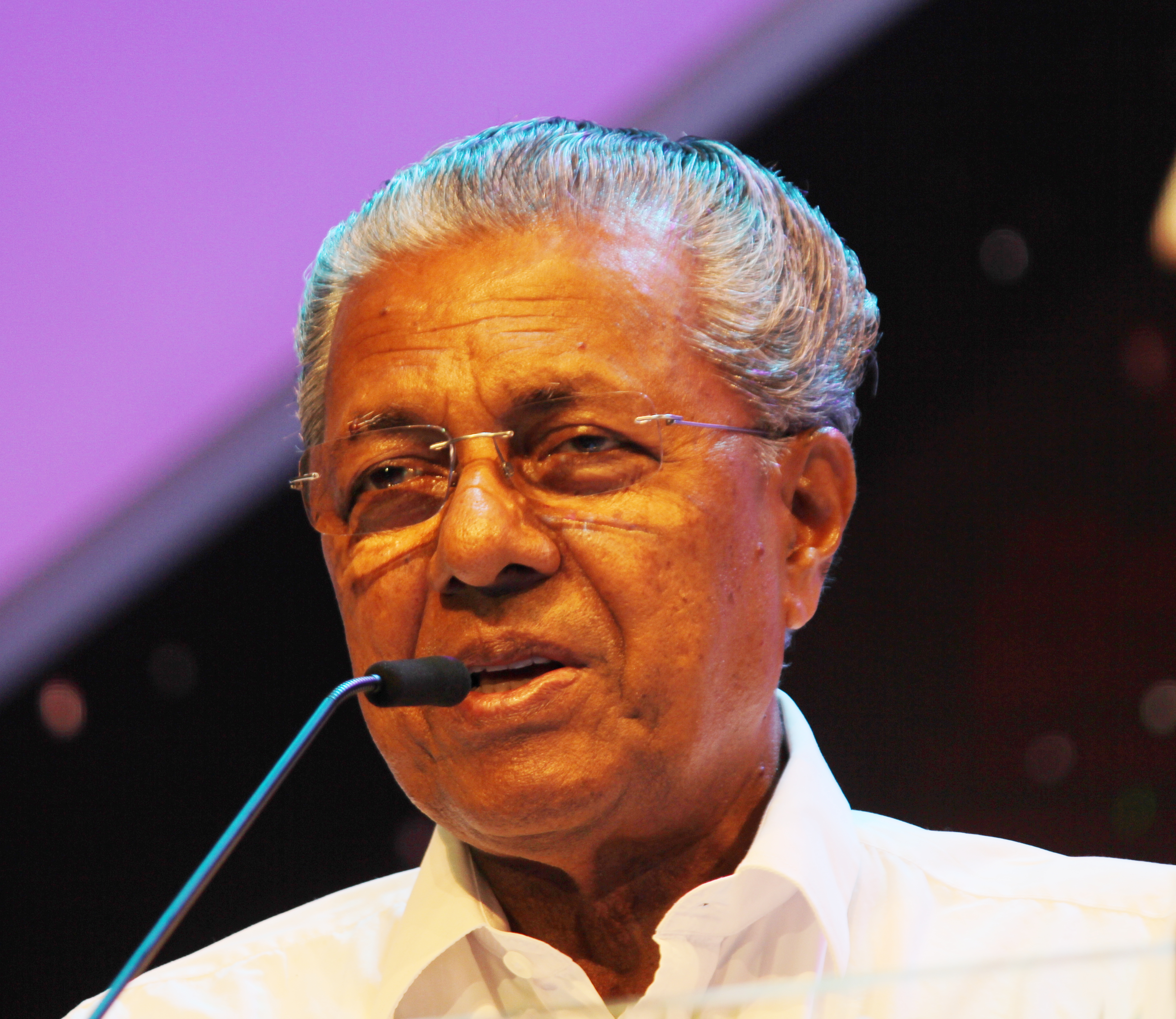
Pinarayi Vijayan, Longest serving continuous Chief minister of Kerala

=== Left-wing/centre-left politics ===
The general socio-political thought and behavior of the Keralite population inclines strongly toward left-wing and center-left groups, as such, communist (Communist Party of India, Communist Party of India (Marxist)) parties have made strong inroads across the state for decades. In fact, Kerala is the first autonomous polity in Asia and only second in the world to have democratically elected a fully communist-led (Communist Party of India) government into power, with the first-ever being San Marino, a microstate enclaved by Italy.

Northern Kerala, particularly the districts of Kannur, Kozhikode, and Palakkad, along with southern districts like Kollam and Alappuzha, have traditionally served as strongholds of the Left Democratic Front (LDF). However, Kerala's electorate regularly alternates between coalitions, and in the 2026 Kerala Legislative Assembly election, the center-right United Democratic Front (UDF) swept into power with 102 of 140 seats, reducing the LDF to 35 seats and making significant gains across traditional left bastions.

Some parties like Communist Marxist Party, Janathipathiya Samrakshana Samithy and the Revolutionary Marxist Party of India also represent left-wing politics in the state.

=== Congress politics ===
The Indian National Congress leads the United Democratic Front pre-poll alliance in Kerala. The alliance was created by the Congress (then known as Congress-Indira) party leader K. Karunakaran in 1978. Since the 1980s, it has sustained itself as the front to take on the Communist Party of India Marxist-led Left Democratic Front.

The alliance first came into power in Kerala in 1981 under K. Karunakaran. It led the Kerala government in 1981–82 (Karunakaran), 1982–87 (Karunakaran), 1991–96 (Karunakaran and A. K. Antony), 2001–06 (Antony and Oommen Chandy) and 2011–16 (Chandy).

The party has strong bases in Ernakulam and Kottayam regions of central Kerala.

The Nationalist Congress Party- Sharadchandra Pawar and Congress (S) are other parties which holds the Congress politics. Both of them were split from Indian National Congress, and now form allies of LDF. The Kerala Congress factions also have their origin in a split which occurred in Indian National Congress in the year 1964. DIC(K) was another party formed by raising Congress politics in Kerala, but was later dissolved.

==== Political underrepresentation of Ezhava community ====
Despite constituting around 24% of Kerala's population, the Ezhava community has been described as under-represented in both the LDF and the UDF. In the preceding LDF ministry (2021–2026), Ezhavas held 5 ministerial positions, while the Nair community, comprising about 12% of the state's population, held 7 ministerial posts. Following the 2026 Assembly election, overall Ezhava representation in the 16th Kerala Legislative Assembly dropped to 17 MLAs across all fronts (down from 27 in the LDF alone in 2021), largely due to the LDF's seat tally falling from 99 to 35.

Within the UDF, representation concerns have persisted both organisationally and in governance. Following the Congress leadership revamp ahead of the 2026 polls, Adoor Prakash (as UDF convenor) remained the only OBC leader in the party's top state leadership, while none of the three working presidents of the KPCC—Shafi Parambil, A. P. Anil Kumar, and P. C. Vishnunadh—and only 4 of the 14 District Congress Committee (DCC) presidents belonged to the Ezhava community. Among the state's 14 Congress MPs, 2 belong to the community. In the 2026 Assembly election, where the Congress won 63 seats, 9 of its elected MLAs were from the Ezhava community (up from 1 out of 22 MLAs in 2021), and 3 Ezhava members were inducted into the 21-member Satheesan ministry formed in May 2026.

=== Communal politics ===
Indian Union Muslim League is a major member of the United Democratic Front. Indian Union Muslim League first gained a ministry in Kerala Government as part of a Communist Party of India Marxist-led alliance in the late 1960s. The party later switched fronts and formed an alliance with the Congress. It later became a chief constituent in a succession of Indian National Congress-lead ministries.

The party has strong bases in Malappuram District in central Kerala. The party is also strong in the northern belts of Kasaragod district and the southern parts of Kozhikode district in Northern Kerala.

Kerala Congress, which has several factions in United Democratic Front and Left Democratic Front, has strong influence in central Kerala. The various Kerala Congress factions are primarily patronized by the Syrian Christian community, mostly in areas like Kottayam, Idukki, Pathanamthitta and Muvattupuzha.

=== Right-wing politics ===
Right-wing politics in Kerala is represented by the Bharatiya Janata Party. The BJP got their first seat in the Kerala Legislative Assembly in 2016. The BJP failed to win a seat in the 2021 elections, but won 1 seat in the 2024 Indian general election in Kerala and 3 seats in the 2026 Legislative Assembly elections.

== Coalition politics ==
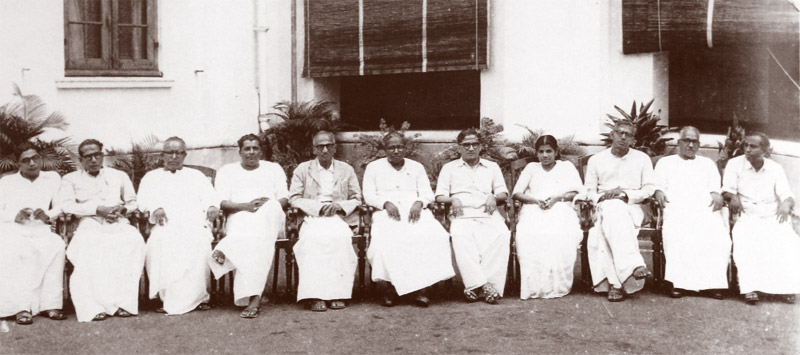
First Council of Ministers, EMS Namboothiripad Ministry

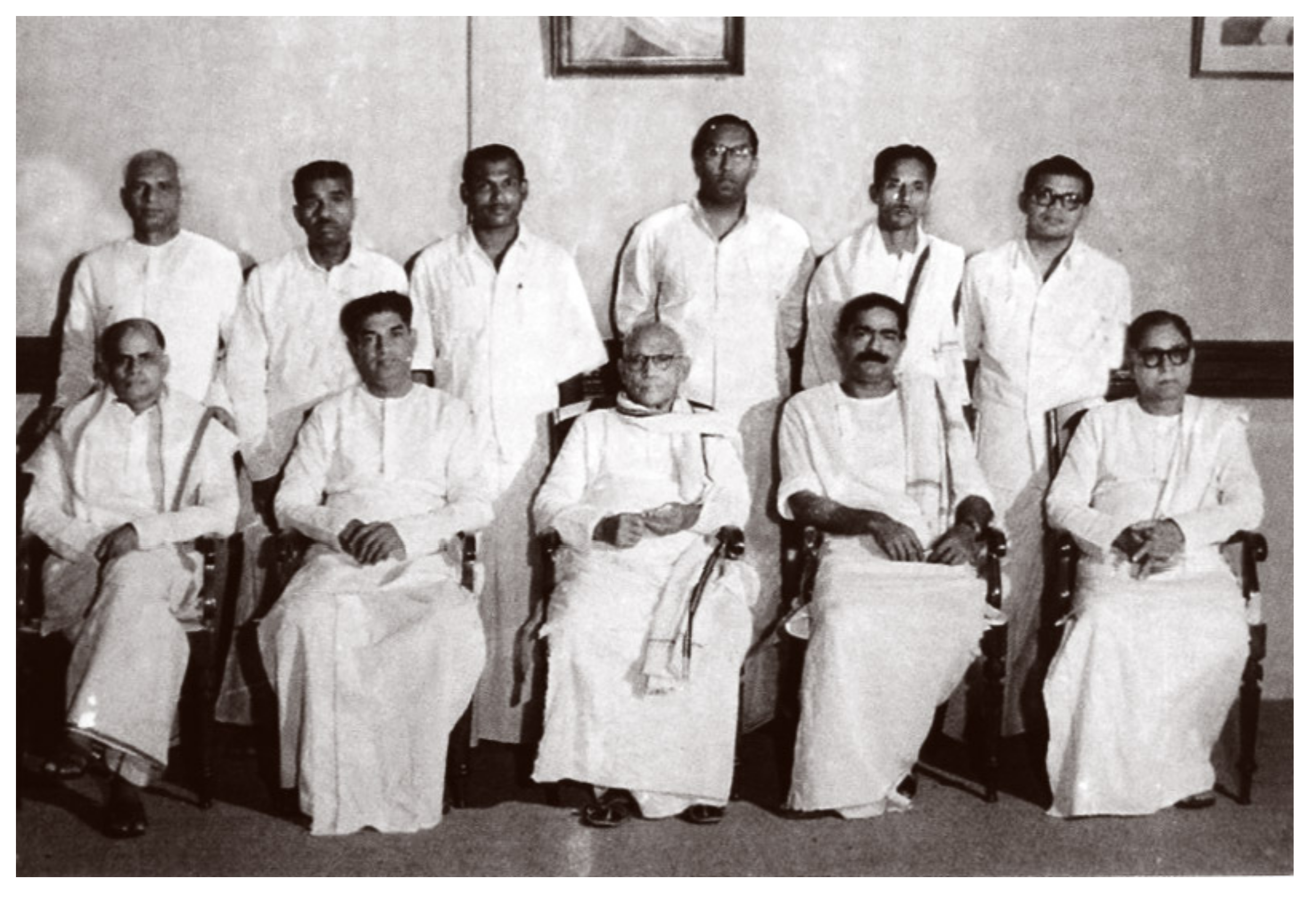
Second Council of Ministers

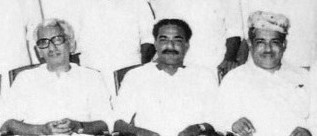
A. K. Antony, K. Karunakaran, K. M. Mani and C. H. Muhammed Koya

The current politics in Kerala is largely dominated by two pre-poll alliances

- Indian National Congress-led United Democratic Front (UDF) and
- Communist Party of India (Marxist)-led Left Democratic Front (LDF)
- Bharatiya Janata Party- led (NDA)

The two alliances (LDF and UDF) have been alternatively voted to power in Kerala since 1980 barring 2021 (from the First E. K. Nayanar ministry and until First Pinarayi Vijayan ministry).

The pre-poll political alliances of Kerala have stabilized strongly in such a manner that, with rare exceptions, most of the coalition partners stick their loyalty to the respective alliances (Left Democratic Front or United Democratic Front). As a result of this, ever since 1979, the power has been clearly alternating between the two alliances without any exceptions, until this spell was broken in the 2021 Kerala Legislative Assembly election.

However, till then the political scenario in Kerala (1957–1980) was characterized by continually shifting alliances, party mergers and splits, factionalism within the coalitions and within political parties, and the formation of a numerous splinter groups. In the late 1970s and early 1980s, two main pre-poll political alliances were formed: the Left Democratic Front, led by the Communist Party of India (Marxist) and Communist Party of India and the United Democratic Front, led by the Indian National Congress.

Since the early 1980s these two pre-poll political alliances have alternated in government with neither able to gain re-election for a second term. Clashes between supporters of the two coalitions have occurred periodically. Both have accused the other of corruption, promoting or condoning political violence, and "the general breakdown of law and order" during their periods in government.

Mandate	Ministry No.	Ruling Coalition Name
2026	24	UDF
2021	23	LDF
2016	22	LDF
2011	21	UDF
2006	20	LDF
2001	19	UDF
2001	18	UDF
1996	17	LDF
1991	16	UDF
1991	15	UDF
1987	14	LDF
1982	13	UDF
1980	12	UDF
1980	11	LDF
1977	10	—
1977	9	—
1977	8	—
1977	7	—
1970	6	—
1967	5	—
1967	4	—
1965		No ministry formed
1960	3	—
1960	2	—
1957	1	—

== Student politics ==
Student politics in Kerala is highly active and influential, unlike in many other Indian states where it has declined. Most student organizations are linked to major political parties and there are student political alliances as well, such as the United Democratic Students Front (UDSF), which includes KSU and MSF.

Below is the list of active students parties in Kerala:

Student Political Parties in Kerala
Name of the Student Organization	Year of Establishment	Political Affiliation
Students' Federation of India (SFI)	1970	Communist Party of India (Marxist) – CPI(M)
Kerala Students Union (KSU)	1957	Indian National Congress – INC
Akhil Bharatiya Vidyarthi Parishad (ABVP)	1949 (Nationally)	Rashtriya Swayamsevak Sangh – RSS / Bharatiya Janata Party – BJP
All India Students Federation (AISF)	1936 (Nationally)	Communist Party of India – CPI
Muslim Students Federation (MSF)	1937	Indian Union Muslim League – IUML
Fraternity Movement	2011	Welfare Party of India /

== 2026 Assembly elections ==
LDF	Seats	UDF	Seats	NDA	Seats
CPI(M)	26	INC	63	BJP	3
CPI	8	IUML	22	BDJS	0
RJD	1	KEC	7	Twenty20	0
KC(M)	0	UDF Independent	4	NDA Independent	0
NCP(SP)	0	RSP	3		
ISJD	0	KC(J)	1		
C(S)	0	RMPI	1		
KC(B)	0	CMP	1		
INL	0				
RSP(L)	0				
LDF Independent	0				
LDF	35	UDF	102	NDA	3

Parties	Popular vote		Seats	
Parties	Votes	%	Candidates	Won
Indian National Congress (INC)	6,217,918	28.96	92	63
Communist Party of India (Marxist) (CPI(M))	4,700,662	21.89	77	26
Bharatiya Janata Party (BJP)	2,466,178	11.49	98	3
Indian Union Muslim League (IUML)	2,378,053	11.08	26	22
Communist Party of India (CPI)	1,434,524	6.68	24	8
Kerala Congress (M) (KC(M))	561,157	2.61	12	0
Kerala Congress (KEC)	525,323	2.45	8	7
Revolutionary Socialist Party (RSP)	261,551	1.22	4	3

== See also ==
- Political parties in Kerala
- Communist Party of India (Marxist) – Kerala
- Communism in India
