= Thiruvananthapuram District Panchayat =

Local government institution in Thiruvananthapuram

Thiruvananthapuram District Panchayat Thiruvananthapuram Jilla Panchayat
- District: Thiruvananthapuram
- Seat: Pattom, Thiruvananthapuram, 695004
- Wards/Divisions: 28

Government
  - Body: District Panchayat Council
  - President: V. Priyadarshini (CPI(M))
  - Vice President: B.P. Murali (CPI(M))
- Website: thiruvananthapuramdp.lsgkerala.gov.in/en/

Thiruvananthapuram District Panchayat, also known as Thiruvananthapuram District Council, is the apex rural local government body in Thiruvananthapuram district, Kerala, and the highest tier of the state's three-tier Panchayati Raj system. The Thiruvananthapuram District Panchayat has jurisdiction over Thiruvananthapuram district, except for its municipal and city corporation areas. It is headquartered in Thiruvananthapuram and is divided into territorial divisions, each represented by an elected member. The Kerala State Election Commission is responsible for conducting these elections.

== Governance ==
The district panchayat is headed by a president and vice president, who are elected from among its members. It has five standing committees, each headed by a chairperson elected from among its members. The committees are responsible for matters relating to Finance, Development, Health and Education, Welfare, and Public Works. The district panchayat secretary, appointed by the state government, is responsible for its administration, serves as its chief executive officer, and implements the decisions of the district panchayat.

== Block councils in jurisdiction ==
Thiruvananthapuram District Panchayat comprises 11 block panchayats: Athiyannur, Kilimanoor, Nedumangad, Nemom, Parassala, Perumkadavila, Vamanapuram, Varkala, Vellanad, Venganoor and Chirayinkeezhu.

== Present Council ==
The incumbent president is V. Priyadarshini, while the vice president is B.P. Murali. Both are members of the Communist Party of India (Marxist) (CPI(M)).

== Division/Wards ==
| No. | Division |
|---|---|
| 1 | Ilakamon |
| 2 | Kilimanoor |
| 3 | Kallara |
| 4 | Venjaramoodu |
| 5 | Anad |
| 6 | Palode |
| 7 | Aryanad |
| 8 | Vellanad |
| 9 | Poovachal |
| 10 | Ottasekharamangalam |
| 11 | Vellarada |
| 12 | Kunnathukal |
| 13 | Parassala |
| 14 | Mariyapuram |
| 15 | Kanjiramkulam |
| 16 | Kottukal |
| 17 | Venganoor |
| 18 | Pallichal |
| 19 | Malayinkeezhu |
| 20 | Karakulam |
| 21 | Pothencode |
| 22 | Kaniyapuram |
| 23 | Murukkumpuzha |
| 24 | Kizhuvilam |
| 25 | Chirayinkeezhu |
| 26 | Manambur |
| 27 | Kallambalam |

== See also ==
- Local government in Kerala
