= Kollam District Panchayat =

Local government institution in Kollam

Kollam District Panchayat Kollam Jilla Panchayat
- District: Kollam
- Seat: Kollam
- Wards/Divisions: 27

Government
  - Body: District Panchayat Council
  - President: Dr. R. Latha Devi (CPI)
  - Vice President: S. R. Arun Babu (CPI(M))

Area
  - Total: 2,491 km^{2} (962 sq mi)

Population (2011)
  - Total: 2,635,375
  - Density: 1,058/km^{2} (2,740/sq mi)
- Website: kollamdp.lsgkerala.gov.in

Kollam District Panchayat, also known as Kollam District Council, is the apex rural local government body in Kollam district, Kerala, and the highest tier of the state's three-tier Panchayati Raj system. The Kollam District Panchayat has jurisdiction over the rural areas of Kollam district, excluding the areas administered by the Kollam Municipal Corporation and the district's municipalities. It is headquartered in Kollam and consists of elected representatives from its territorial divisions. The Kerala State Election Commission is responsible for conducting these elections.

== Governance ==
The district panchayat is headed by a president and vice president, who are elected from among its members. It has five standing committees, each headed by a chairperson elected from among its members. The committees are responsible for matters relating to Finance, Development, Health and Education, Welfare, and Public Works. The district panchayat secretary, appointed by the state government, is responsible for its administration, serves as its chief executive officer, and implements the decisions of the district panchayat.

== Block councils in jurisdiction ==
Kollam District Panchayat comprises 11 block panchayats: Oachira, Sasthamcotta, Vettikavala, Pathanapuram, Anchal, Kottarakkara, Chittumala, Chavara, Mukhathala, Ithikkara and Chadayamangalam.

== Present Council ==
The incumbent president is Dr. R. Latha Devi, a member of the Communist Party of India (CPI), while the vice president is S. R. Arun Babu, a member of the Communist Party of India (Marxist) (CPI(M)). They assumed office in December 2025 following the local body elections.

== Division/Wards ==
The Kollam District Panchayat's territorial divisions are listed in the official delimitation notification. The final division names should be transcribed from the official map before adding the complete table.

No.	Division
See the official final delimitation map for the complete division list.

== See also ==
- Local government in Kerala
- Kollam district
