= Information Kerala Mission =

Indian e-governance institution

Agency overview
- Formed: 1999
- Type: E-governance institution
- Jurisdiction: Government of Kerala
- Headquarters: Thiruvananthapuram, Kerala, India
- Agency executive: Santhosh Babu IAS (Retd.), Chief Mission Director & Executive Director
- Parent department: Local Self Government Department (LSGD)
- Website: www.ikm.gov.in

Information Kerala Mission (IKM), is an Autonomous Institution under the Local self government Department of the Government of Kerala, for the computerisation and networking of local governments in Kerala, a state in India. This organisation has been in existence for more than two decades since August 1999.

== Basic objective ==
The basic objective of IKM is to provide vibrant Information technology e-governance to the local governments in Kerala.IKM attempts to strengthen local self-governance or third tier governance and development through ICT (Information and Communications Technology) applications. It envisages computerising and networking the 1223 local self-government institutions (LSGIs) in Kerala. It is the largest and most comprehensive local government computerisation project in India. It addresses the entire gamut of issues concerning local governance, decentralised planning, and local economic development.

Executive Director Of IKM- Seeram Sambasiva Rao IAS

== Phased implementation ==
IKM envisages a phased transformation of the existing systems to electronic systems. It has developed methodologies that suit this purpose. IKM has adopted a human-centred approach to e-governance. This approach is characterised by the holistic and proactive evaluation of existing systems and legacy systems, attempts to simplify and transform existing systems and effecting integration of systems. Systematic attempts at process reforms are also part of it. These would enable faster and objective decision-making, more citizen-friendly interfaces and better accountability.

IKM Methodology places the employees and functionaries at the central stage of this transformation and focuses on their empowerment and capacity building as the mechanism for improving performance. The software applications are developed through active user participation. Emphasis is placed on demystification of technologies and establishing adequate technical support systems. Training and hand holding are given high priority. IKM has taken out extensive pilot deployment of its application suites.

== Application Software ==
- Sulekha : Plan Monitoring for decentralised planning at local level
- Sevana : Civil Registration - Births, Deaths and Marriages Registration
- Sanchitha : Repository of acts and rules relating to local bodies
- Soochika : Work flow application. Status Monitoring over web, and eSMS integration
- Sanchaya : The Revenue & Licence System
- Saankhya : Double entry accrual based accounting for all local governments
- Sthapana : Payroll, PF accounting (Municipal and Panchayat employees PF accounts)
- Samvedhitha : LSGD web portal for all local governments and the Department
- Sachithra : Map suite (GIS) and asset register for local governments
- Sevana Pension : Disbursement of social welfare pensions, with electronic money order (eMO) integration
- Sakarma : Handling of council/committee agenda, minutes, etc.
- Sugama : Cost Estimation tool for public works
- Sanketham : Ensures transparency in granting Building Permits (KMBR)
- Subhadra : Financial Management System
- Samoohya : Citizen database
- Saphalya : Human resource package

== Online Services ==
- Birth & Death Registration
- Marriage Registration & efiling
- Plan Monitoring
- LSGD Portal
- Property Tax & epayment
- Social Security Pension
- GIS Maps
- Double Entry Accounting
- File Tracking
- Building Permit
- Municipality Employees PF
- Panchayat Employees PF
- Legal Advisor

== Awards ==
- Sulekha (Plan Formulation and Monitoring System for Decentralised Planning of Local Governments) won the gold medal in National Awards or e-governance 2009–10 by Government of India for under the category "Excellence in Government Process Re-engineering". Sevana (Civil Registration System and Hospital Kiosks) won Brownze medal under the category "Outstanding performance in Citizen-Centric Service Delivery"
- CSI Nihilent e-governance Awards 2008-09 for Sulekha Plan Monitoring System for Decentralised Planning, Kerala

== See also ==
- Local Governance in Kerala
- Kerala State IT Mission
- Local eGovernment
- My Gov
