= 2015 Kerala local elections =

Indian municipal elections

2015 Kerala Local Elections
- 2, 5 November 2015

1199 of 1200 local bodies in Kerala (Note: Mattanur municipality elections are held in a different cycle, hence elections to this municipality were not held in 2015.)
- Turnout: 77.7% (▲%)
Alliance	LDF	UDF	NDA
Percentage	37.4%	37.2%	13.3%
Grama Panchayat	549	365	14
Block Panchayat	90	61	0
District Panchayat	7	7	0
Municipality	44	41	1
Corporation	4	2	0

Elections to local bodies (Panchayats, Municipalities and Corporations) in Kerala were held in two phrases, on 2 and 5 November 2015. The Left Democratic Front (LDF) won more than half of all gram panchayats and municipalities, and both they and the United Democratic Front (UDF) won majorities in seven out of fourteen district panchayats each. The LDF also won mayorship in four corporations and the UDF in two.

== Background ==
Kerala Panchayat Raj Act, 1994 made provisions for the creation of local bodies at the village, block and district levels. The Kerala Municipalities Act, 1994 made provisions for the creation of municipalities and corporations.

In total, Kerala has 1200 local self-governing bodies – 941 gram panchayats, 14 district panchayats, 152 block panchayats, 87 municipalities, 77 taluks, and 6 corporations.

== Parties and coalitions ==
There are three major political coalitions in Kerala. The Left Democratic Front (LDF) is the coalition of left wing and far-left parties, led by the Communist Party of India (Marxist) (CPI(M)). The United Democratic Front (UDF) is the coalition of centrist and centre-left parties led by the Indian National Congress. The National Democratic Alliance is led by the right-wing Bharatiya Janata Party.

== Campaign ==
Chief Minister Oommen Chandy said the election results would be a verdict on his government. Former Chief Minister A. K. Antony cited that the local body elections were the semifinals to the forthcoming 2016 elections. Allegations of the finance minister of the state K. M. Mani accepting bribes from bar owners was made a focal point of the campaign by opposition parties.

The Bharatiya Janata Party (BJP) forged an alliance with SNDP in a bid to win the Ezhava community votes. UDF had rebel candidates in various panchayats and municipalities. Twenty20, an organisation backed by Kitex Group contested in Kizhakkambalam grama panchayat.

Vote Share by alliance
1. LDF (37.4%)
2. UDF (37.3%)
3. NDA (13.3%)
4. Other (12.0%)

== Result ==
Districts	Voter Turnout	
District wise map of Kerala	District	Percentage
	Kasaragod	77.6
	Kannur	78.9
	Wayanad	81.5
	Kozhikode	80.1
	Malappuram	79.7
	Palakkad	78.9
	Thrissur	76.5
	Ernakulam	78.5
	Idukki	79.7
	Kottayam	78.3
	Alappuzha	79.7
	Pathanamthitta	72.5
	Kollam	74.9
	Thriuvananthapuram	71.9
Kerala		77.8

=== Local Body Wise Results ===
2015 Kerala local body elections
Local self-government body	Local Bodies won				Total
Local self-government body	LDF	UDF	NDA	Others	Total
Gram Panchayats	549	365	14	13	941
Block Panchayats	90	61	0	1	152
District Panchayats	7	7	0	0	14
Municipalities	44	41	1	0	87
Corporations	4	2	0	0	6

=== Ward-Wise Results ===
2015 Kerala local body elections
Local self-government body	Wards won				Total
Local self-government body	LDF	UDF	NDA	Others	Total
Gram Panchayats	7,623	6,324	933	1,078	15,962
Block Panchayats	1,088	917	21	53	2,076
District Panchayats	170	145	3	4	331
Municipalities	1,263	1,318	236	259	3,122
Corporations	196	143	51	24	414

Municipal Corporations
District	Corporation	Wards won				Total	Alliance in majority
District	Corporation	LDF	UDF	NDA	Others	Total	Alliance in majority
Thiruvananthapuram	Thiruvananthapuram	43	21	35	1	100	N/A (LDF won mayorship later)
Kozhikode	Kozhikode	50	18	7	0	75	LDF
Ernakulam	Kochi	23	38	2	11	74	UDF
Kollam	Kollam	36	16	2	1	55	LDF
Thrissur	Thrissur	23	21	6	5	55	N/A (LDF won mayorship later)
Kannur	Kannur	26	27	0	2	55	N/A (UDF won mayorship later)

== Aftermath ==
Kerala Pradesh Congress Committee (KPCC) president V. M. Sudheeran said that the results show that the UDF base had not been affected much. BJP state president V. Muraleedharan stated that it was impossible to fight an election in Kerala without taking their alliance into account.

Twenty20 won 17 of 19 seats in Kizhakkambalam gram panchayat, thereby becoming the first corporate-ruled local body in Kerala.

An Indian National Congress candidate for Mananthavady municipality, who was the Congress District Committee secretary, committed suicide after coming in third place.

== See also ==
- Elections in Kerala
- 2020 Kerala local body elections
- 2011 Kerala Legislative Assembly election
- 2016 Kerala Legislative Assembly election
