= 1957 Indian general election in Kerala =

- 28 February 1957

18 of the 489 seats in the Lok Sabha
- Turnout: 66.05
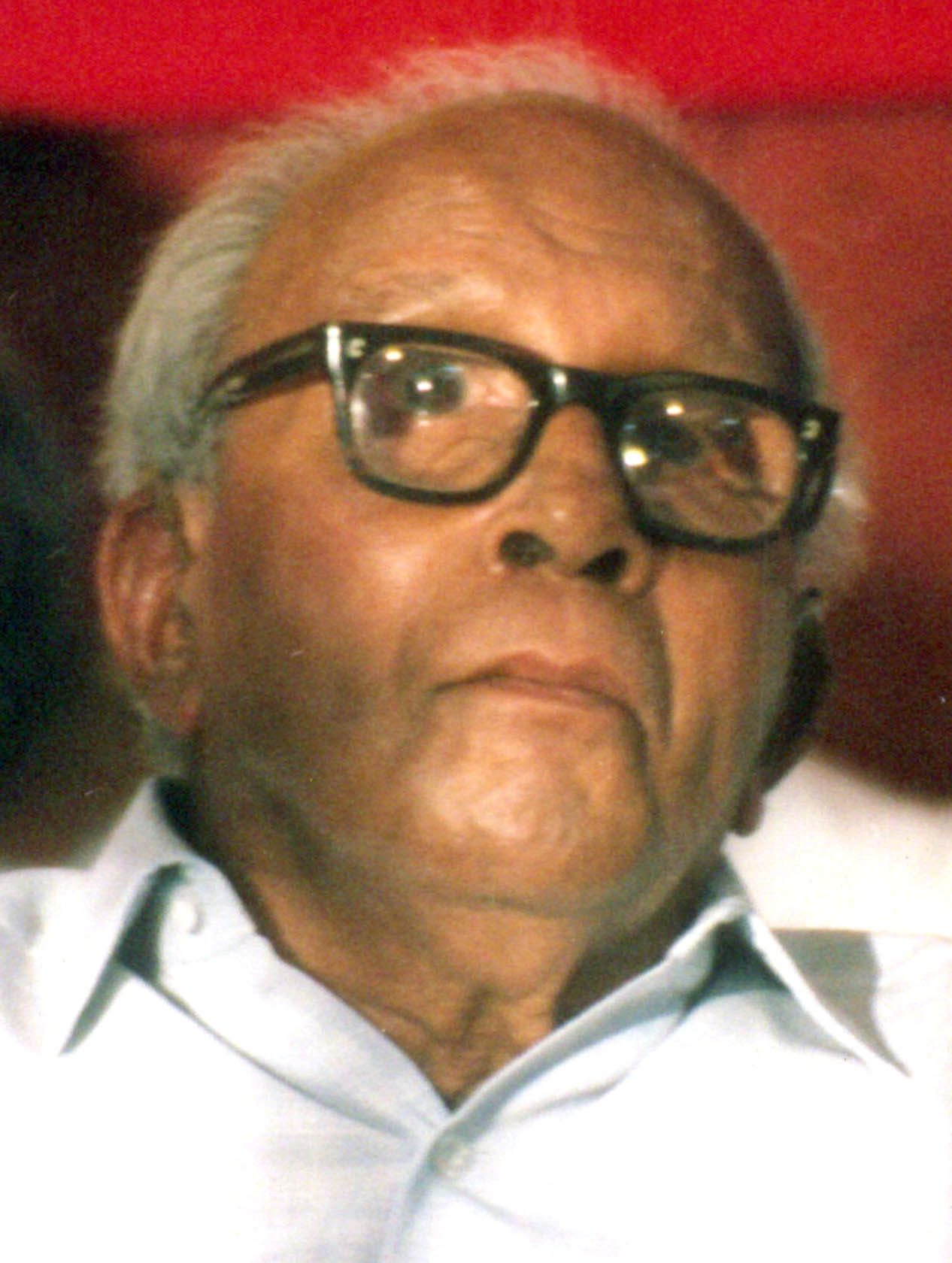

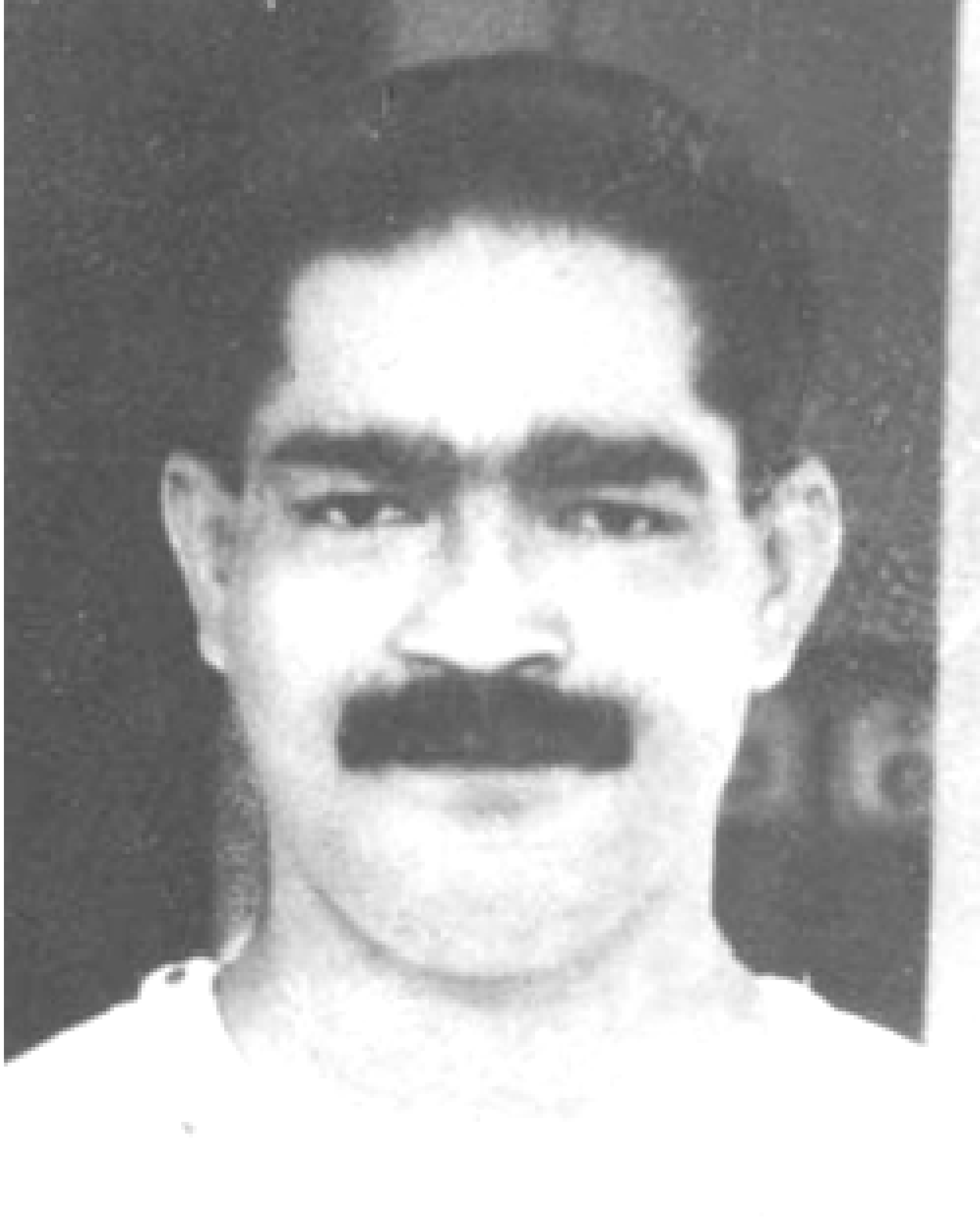
	First party	Second party
Leader	E. M. S. Namboodiripad	P. T. Chacko
Party	CPI	INC
Seats won	9	6
Popular vote	22,67,888	21,02,883
Percentage	37.48	34.76
Prime Minister before election
Jawaharlal Nehru
INC
Prime Minister after election
Jawaharlal Nehru
INC

1957 Indian general election in Kerala was held for 18 seats in the state. The result was a victory for Communist Party of India winning 9 out of 18 seats. The major opposition for CPI, the Indian National Congress, won 6 seats.

== Results ==
=== By Party ===
Party	Votes	%	Seats
Communist Party of India	2,267,888	37.48	9
Indian National Congress	2,102,883	34.76	6
Praja Socialist Party	438,459	7.25	1
Revolutionary Socialist Party	308,742	5.10	0
Independents	932,274	15.41	2
Total	6,050,246	100.00	18
Source: ECI

=== By constituency ===
#	Constituency	Turnout	Winner	Party	Runner-up	Party
1	Trivandrum	2,88,976	Easwara Iyer	Independent	Thanu Pillai A	PSP
2	Chirayinkil	2,68,222	Kumaran	CPI	Madhavan	INC
3	Quilon	12,03,754	Parameswaran Nair V	CPI	Ramachandra Das (S. C. )	INC
3	Quilon	12,03,754	Kodiyan (S. C. )	CPI	Chandrasekharan (S. C. )	RSP
4	Ambalapuzha	3,24,471	Punnoose, P. T.	CPI	Mohammed Sheriff K. P.	INC
5	Thiruvalla	3,00,891	Vasudevan Nair P. K.	CPI	George, P. S.	INC
6	Kottayam	2,87,074	Mathew Maniyangadan	INC	Thomas	CPI
7	Muvattupuzha	2,42,844	George Thomas	INC	Jacob K. T.	CPI
8	Ernakulam	2,94,600	Thomas (Alungal)	INC	Abdul Kadar	Independent
9	Mukundapuram	3,05,569	Narayanankutty Menon	CPI	Madhavan E. K.	INC
10	Trichur	2,80,441	Krishnan	CPI	Balakrishna Marar	INC
11	Palghat	9,10,729	Kunhan P. (SC)	CPI	Damodaran K.	CPI
11	Palghat	9,10,729	Eacharan V. Iyyani (SC)	INC	Vasu Menon, P.	INC
13 (Note: This is not a mistake in numbering, it is the order of it given in ECI result)	Kozhikode	2,68,664	Kuttikrishnan Nair	INC	Seethi Sahib Kottapurath	Independent
14	Manjeri	2,29,402	Pocker Kuttivatha	Independent	Kunhikoya Palat	INC
15	Badagara	2,95,682	Menon K. B.	PSP	Gopalan Karipur	INC
16	Tellicherry	2,96,394	M. K. Jinachandran	INC	Pottekkattu S. K	Independent
17	Kasergod	2,52,533	Gopalan Ayillath Kuttieri	CPI	Achutha Shenoy B.	Independent

== Bibliography ==
- Volume I, 1957 Indian general election, 2nd Lok Sabha
