= Kerala State Election Commission =

Body charged with assuring fair elections in Kerala

Agency overview
- Formed: 3 December 1993
- Jurisdiction: Kerala
- Headquarters: Vikas Bhavan P.O, Thiruvananthapuram - 695 033
- Agency executives: N Seshadrinathan, State Election Commissioner.; A. Kowsigan, Chief Electoral Officer (CEO)
- Website: www.sec.kerala.gov.in

The Kerala State Election Commission is an autonomous constitutional body constituted in the Indian state of Kerala for supervising and conducting elections to the local self-government institutions, ensuring that the electoral process is free, fair, and unbiased. Constitution of India with provisions as per Article 243K and 243 ZA and Article 324 ensures creation and safeguarding of the powers of State Election Commissions. The Kerala State Election Commission is responsible for conducting elections for Urban Local Bodies like Municipalities and Municipal Corporations, as well as Rural Local Bodies like Panchayats (which include Gram Panchayats, Block Panchayats, and District Panchayats), and any others specified by the Election Commission of India. Kerala State Election Commissioner is appointed by the Governor of Kerala.

== History and administration ==
Kerala State Election Commission was formed in accordance with powers of Election Commission of India, which was constituted in year 1950 to supervise state level elections. State election commissioner is appointed by Governor. To ensure the autonomy of the position, the Kerala state election commissioner cannot be removed from office except on the grounds and manner specified for judge of High Court.

Kerala State Election Commission operates from Vikas Bhavan premises, located near Kerala State Assembly premises.

== Powers and responsibilities ==
Kerala States Election Commissioner is responsible for the following:

- Releasing election schedule.
- Issue notification containing guidelines for conducting elections for Municipal Corporations in State.
- Conducting elections for Municipal Corporations in State.
- Issue notification containing guidelines for conducting elections for conducting elections for Municipalities in State.
- Conducting elections for Municipalities in State.
- Laying guidelines for persons eligible to contest in elections for Municipal Corporations in State.
- Conducting elections for Municipalities in State.
- Model code of conduct are following in elections for local bodies.
- Updating Electoral rolls with new additions.
- Updating Electoral rolls with removals, if any.
- Declaration of results of elections held for Municipal Corporations in State.
- Declaration of results of elections held for Municipalities in State.
- Ordering repoll if needed.
- Making arrangements for Statewide polls.
- Monitoring poll expenditure for Panchayat and Municipalities polls.
- Laying guidelines for issue of opinion polls.
- Decision on conducting elections.
- Declaring results of local body polls.
- Municipal and Panchayat constituencies delimitation exercise.
- Countermanding elections in case of malpractices.

== Composition ==
Kerala State Election Commission is headed by the State Election Commissioner and as many members as specified in State Act. State Election Commissioners are independent persons not holding position or office in any Central or State Government organisations The State Election Commissioner is appointed by the Governor of Kerala. The Secretary is the chief administrative officer of the State Election Commission. The Secretary heads the Commission’s secretariat and is responsible for implementing the directions of the State Election Commissioner.

Election Commissioner's period of service will be 5 years or attaining an age of 65 years whichever is earlier.

== Election machinery ==
At the district level, the District Collector is designated as the District Election Officer (DEO) for conducting elections to local self-government institutions (LSGIs). The Deputy Collector (Election) functions as the Assistant District Election Officer (ADEO), assisting the DEO in all election-related responsibilities. The District Collector also acts as the Returning Officer for District Panchayat elections.

Officers from the Revenue Department, Local Self Government Department and other officials from various government departments will assist the State Election Commission for the conduction of the Election. The commission authorize such officers to various duties.

== Constitutional requirements ==
Kerala State Election Commission was formed after amendment of Constitution with 73rd and 74th declaration. State Election Commissions were formed as per Article 243K of the Constitution, similar to setting up of Election commission of India as per Article 324.

== See also ==
- Election Commission of India.
