= Aikkaranad =

- Gram panchayat
- Location in Kerala, India Aikkaranad (India)
- Coordinates: 10.0002200°N 76.4549790°E
- Country: India
- State: Kerala
- District: Ernakulam

Population (2011)
  - Total: 20,316

Languages
  - Official: Malayalam, English
- Time zone: UTC+5:30 (IST)

Aikaranad Grama panchayat is a Gram panchayat in Ernakulam district in the Indian state of Kerala. Aikaranad Grama panchayat is situated in Vadavucode Block panchayat. Aikaranad Grama panchayat falls in Kunnathunad Tehsil.

== Demographics ==
As of 2011 India census, Aikaranad North had a population of 20,316; 10,081 males and 10,235 females.
