= Local government in Kerala =

Indian state government

Gram Panchayats in Kerala

Kerala is a state on the southwestern coast of India. It is known for its high literacy rate, low infant mortality rate, and long life expectancy.

Following the 73rd and 74th amendment (both in 1992) of the Constitution of India which entrusted states with establishing Panchayati Raj institutions and Urban Local Bodies for devolution of powers, the Kerala government enacted the Kerala Panchayat Raj Act and the Kerala Municipality Act in 1994. These Acts established a three-tier system of local government in Kerala, consisting of gram panchayats (village councils), block panchayats, and district panchayats for rural governance, and a single-tier system consisting of municipal corporations and municipalities for urban governance. The acts also gave these local governments a wide range of powers and responsibilities, including providing basic civic amenities, promoting economic development, and providing social welfare services.

== Overview ==
Developmental administration is the main objective of local bodies in Kerala. These are constituted as urban and rural local bodies and are responsible for implementing centrally sponsored, state-funded, and externally aided schemes for the provision of basic amenities and other services to the public. Elections are held every five years to elect representatives to the councils of the respective urban and rural local bodies.

The Local Self Government Department of the Government of Kerala is the administrative authority for local bodies in the state and is headed by a Minister who is an elected member of the Kerala Legislative Assembly.

The Kerala State Election Commission is an independent constitutional body responsible for preparing electoral rolls and conducting elections to local bodies in the state. The Kerala State Finance Commission recommends the distribution of financial resources between the state government and local bodies, ensuring fiscal devolution as mandated by the Constitution.

== Types of Local Governments ==
=== Urban Local Bodies (ULBs) ===
Urban local bodies in Kerala, such as corporations and municipalities, are incorporated entities responsible for the governance and administration of towns and cities within the state. These are classified based on the size of the population and economic activities of the urban settlement.

- Municipal Corporation, also called the "Corporation" or "Nagara Sabha", of cities with more than 1 lakh population.
- Municipality, also called the "Nagara Sabha" of cities with more than 25,000 and less than 1 lakh population.

=== Rural Local Bodies ===
The Panchayati Raj system is a three-tier system of local self-government in rural areas of Kerala that includes Gram Panchayats, Block Panchayats, and District Panchayats. The term "Panchayati Raj" translates to "Rule of Panchayats" or "Rule of Local Self-Government."

- District Panchayat, is the highest tier of Panchayati Raj Institutions (PRIs) in Kerala's rural governance system. It is the district level and represents entire rural areas of the district. It looks after the developmental administration of the rural area of the district.
- Block Panchayat, It is the intermediate level and represents a group of gram panchayats in a block.
- Grama Panchayat, It is the lowest level of the institution and represents a village or a group of villages. it is the local government for a village.

== Grama Sabha / Ward Sabha ==
Grama Sabha
Kerala has created a three-tier in the form of Grama Sabhas equated with the electoral constituency of a Village Panchayat All the electors of the Ward are members of the Grama Sabha. It is an attempt to create a new set up for direct democracy – involving the people of the ward. The Grama Sabhas have been given clear rights and responsibilities with absolute powers for identification of beneficiaries, strong advisory powers for prioritizing developmental needs and wide powers of social audit.
Ward Sabha
A Ward Sabha is constituted for every municipal ward in municipalities with a population below one lakh, comprising all persons listed in that ward’s electoral roll. It is convened by the ward councillor and meets at least once in three months, with the option to call a special meeting if enough residents request it. A minimum number of people must be present for the meeting to proceed, and if a meeting is postponed for lack of attendance, the next one can be held with a smaller fixed number. In these meetings, the councillor shares details of the ward’s development works, plans, and annual accounts.

== Functions of local governments ==
The 11th Schedule of the Constitution of India lists out developmental areas where local governments should have a role in planning for economic development and social justice and in the implementation of such plans. Unlike many other States, The state of Kerala defined the functional areas of the different tiers of local governments precisely. In infrastructure and management of public institutions, the functional differentiation is sharp and clear, but in productive sectors the functions could not be earmarked clearly for each tier. There is a clear recognition that there is a role-range for local governments as Agent, Adviser, Manager, Partner and Actor – with the objective being to reduce the agency role and expand the autonomous – actor role. The Kerala Act classifies functions as mandatory functions, general functions and sector-wise functions. in its schedules.

According to a study Dr Martin Patrick (Chief Economist) CPPR, "Gram panchayats are performing better when compared to their performance three decades earlier but they are still not meeting expected standards in generating own funds with which they can plan their own special projects and steps need to be taken to generate own assets by collecting more non-tax revenue, particularly collecting potential building and professional tax"

== Revenue and funding ==
One of the key features of Kerala’s decentralisation is the formula-based, non-discretionary, and equitable devolution of untied funds to local governments. These are devolved through three main streams: the General Purpose Fund (4% of the State’s Own Tax Revenue), the Maintenance Fund (6.5% of SOTR, split into road and non-road categories), and the Development Fund, which is a share of the State Plan outlay (28.09% in 2024–25). In 2023–24, 27% of the State Plan (₹8,258 crore) was allocated to local governments.

Grama Panchayats and Urban Local Bodies (Corporations and Municipalities) also receive funds under Centrally Sponsored Schemes, such as MGNREGS, Jawaharlal Nehru National Urban Renewal Mission, Smart Cities Mission and have powers to generate own-source revenue, mainly through taxes and user fees. Tax powers are not devolved to Block or District Panchayats, though they may have minor non-tax revenue sources. Devolution is guided by the State Finance Commission (SFC), while Central Finance Commission grants follow norms set by the Union Government. Allocations to each local body are published annually in the State Budget.

=== State government funds ===
- Development grant
- General purpose grant
- Maintenance grant (roads)
- Maintenance grant (non road)

=== Own source revenue ===
Gram Panchayats, Municipalities, and Municipal Corporations are empowered to levy and collect these revenues.

- Property tax
- Profession tax
- License and permit fees
- Rent from civic buildings and markets
- User charges for services such as water supply, waste management, and sanitation, etc.

Block Panchayats and District Panchayats do not have taxation powers but may earn minor income from assets or service fees.

== Committee System ==
All Village and Block Panchayats have three Standing Committees and the District Panchayat have five Standing Committees. The Standing Committees are constituted in such a way that every Member of the Panchayat gets a chance to function in one Standing Committee or the other. Each Standing Committee is assigned certain subjects and these Committees are expected to go into the subject areas both at the planning and implementation stage in great detail. For the purpose of co-ordination, a steering committee is constituted consisting of the President and Vice President of the Panchayat and the Chairpersons of Standing Committees. In addition, there are Functional Committees for different subjects which can include experts and practitioners and the Panchayats are free to constitute Sub Committees to assist the Standing Committee or Functional Committee. There is also provision for constitution of Joint Committees with neighbouring Local Governments.

== The Role of State Government ==
The amended Kerala Panchayat Raj & Municipality Acts drastically reduces the powers of direct governmental control over Panchayat Raj Institutions. While Government can issue general guidelines regarding national and State policies it cannot meddle in day-to-day affairs or individual decisions. The Government can cancel resolutions of the Panchayat only through a process and in consultation with the Ombudsman or Appellate Tribunal according to the subject matter of the resolution. Similarly a Panchayat can be dissolved directly by government, only if it fails to pass the budget or if majority of its members have resigned. In all other cases a due process has to be followed and the Ombudsman has to be consulted before dissolution takes place. This is a unique feature which does not exist even in Center-State relations. In Kerala, Local Self-Government Institutions have been meaningfully empowered through massive transfer of resources as well as administrative powers.

=== Local Self Government Department (LSGD) ===
The state government plays an important role in supporting and overseeing the functioning of local self-government institutions, which include Grama Panchayats, Block Panchayats, District Panchayats, Corporations and Municipalities. The Local Self-Government Department (LSGD) is the government department responsible for the administration and oversight of the local self-government institutions in the state. It is responsible for implementing government policies and programs related to local governance, decentralization, rural development and urban development. Some of the key field departments under the Local Self-Government Department in Kerala include:

- Principal Directorate of Local Self Government Department,
- Directorate of Panchayats, responsible for implementing policies, programs, and schemes related to Grama Panchayats, Block Panchayats, and District Panchayats. It provides administrative support, technical guidance, and training to the elected representatives and officials of the Panchayati Raj institutions.
- Directorate of Urban Affairs, focuses on urban local bodies, including Municipalities and Corporations. It formulates policies and programs for urban development, infrastructure planning, and service delivery.
- Department of Rural Development
- Town and Country planning Department
- LSGD Engineering wing
- Kerala Institute of Local Administration (KILA), autonomous institution dedicated to research, training, and capacity building of elected representatives and officials of local self-government institutions.
- Suchitwa Mission, specialised agency for waste management and sanitation.
- Kudumbasree
- Information Kerala Mission

== Independent Oversight Institutions ==
To reduce governmental control and foster growth of self-government as envisaged in the Constitution, the Act provides for creation of independent institutions to deal with various aspects of local government functioning. They are listed below:-

- The State Election Commission. The Election Commission has been given powers which go beyond those required for the conduct of elections. It is empowered to involve in delimitation of Wards as a member of the Delimitation Committee. Delimitation of wards was formerly done through the executive. The Commission has been given powers to disqualify defectors.
- Delimitation Commission, Kerala: The Delimitation Commission is set up to divide every Panchayat, Municipality and Municipal Corporations in Kerala into wards and determine their boundaries, in accordance with the Kerala Panchayati Raj Act and the Kerala Municipalities Act. It is chaired by the State Election Commissioner and includes four senior government officers, each holding a rank not below Secretary to Government.
- The State Finance Commission. This has been given the mandate as required by the Constitution. The first SFC was constituted in 1994 and the second SFC in 1999.
- Ombudsman for Local Governments. This is a high power institution which has been given vast powers to check malfeasance in local governments in the discharge of developmental functions. The Ombudsman is a State-level authority that investigates corruption, maladministration, and irregularities in the functioning of Local Self Government Institutions. The Ombudsman is a former High Court Judge, and the Ombudsman serves a three-year term from the date of assuming office.
- Tribunal for Local Governments. These are to be constituted at the Regional/District level to take care of appeals by citizens against decisions of the local government taken in the exercise of their regulatory role like issue of licence, grant of permit, etc. The Local Bodies Tribunal hears and decides appeals and revisions against decisions of local bodies. It is headed by a judicial officer in the rank of District Judge.
- State Development Council. This is headed by the Chief Minister and consists of the entire Cabinet, Leader of opposition, Vice-Chairman of the State Planning Board, the Chief Secretary, all the District Panchayat Presidents who are also Chairperson of District Planning Committee and representatives of other tiers of local governments. This institution is expected to take the lead in policy formulation and in sorting out operation issues.

== District Wise Data ==
Kerala has 941 Village Panchayats (Grama panchayats), 152 Block Panchayats and 14 District Panchayats; in the urban areas, it has 87 Municipalities and 6 Corporations, a total of 1200 Local Self Government Institutions. The list of number of local government institutions from the period 1995-2015 is given below:

Local body type	1995	2000	2005	2010	2015
Grama Panchayat	990	991	999	978	941
Block Panchayat	152	152	152	152	152
District Panchayat	14	14	14	14	14
Municipality	55	53	53	60	87
Municipal Corporation	3	5	5	5	6

The President of the Panchayat Raj Institutions(PRIs) has been declared as the executive authority. The senior most officials of various departments brought under the control of the Panchayat Raj Institutions have been declared as ex-officio Secretaries for that subject. The Panchayats have full administrative control including powers of disciplinary action over its own staff as well as staff transferred to it. To encourage a healthy relationship between officials and elected Members, the Act prescribes a code of conduct that lays down principles of polite behavior, respect for elected authorities, and protection of the freedom of the civil servant to render advice freely and fearlessly. All these features are there in the Kerala Municipality Act as well.

The Kerala Panchayat Raj Act and Kerala Municipalities Act 1994 were thoroughly restructured in 1999 and several innovative features laying strong legal foundation for evolving genuine institutions of Local Self Government were built in. The list of various local self governments in the state of Kerala are given below:

District	Urban (ULBs)		Rural (PRIs)		
District	Municipal Corporations	Municipalities	District Panchayats	Block Panchayats	Grama Panchayats
Thiruvananthapuram	1	4	1	12	78
Kollam	1	4	1	11	68
Pathanamthitta	-	4	1	8	53
Alappuzha	-	6	1	12	72
Kottayam	-	6	1	11	71
Idukki	-	2	1	8	52
Ernakulam	1	13	1	14	82
Thrissur	1	7	1	16	86
Palakkad	-	7	1	13	88
Malappuram	-	12	1	15	94
Kozhikode	1	7	1	12	70
Wayanad	-	3	1	4	23
Kannur	1	9	1	11	71
Kasaragod	-	3	1	6	38
Total	6	87	14	152	941

== Institutions under local governments ==
A major part of Kerala’s decentralisation was giving many State government-run service institutions to local governments to manage. These included health institutions, schools, anganwadis, agricultural and veterinary offices, farms, hatcheries, fisheries office and hostels.

The State Government introduced a framework of dual control under which the parent state government departments retained ownership and administrative control, while local governments were entrusted with their utilisation and management, particularly in implementing sector-related programmes.

Institutions transferred to Local Self-Government Institutions (LSGIs) in Kerala
Institution / Office	Level of Local Body	Remarks
Institutions transferred to Grama Panchayats
Krishi Bhavan	Grama Panchayat	Agriculture extension services
Government Veterinary Hospital	Grama Panchayat	Animal husbandry services
Primary Health Centres (PHC)(Allopathy)	Grama Panchayat	Primary public health care
Primary Health Centre (Ayurveda)	Grama Panchayat	AYUSH healthcare service
Primary Health Centre (Homoeopathy)	Grama Panchayat	AYUSH healthcare service
Anganwadies and Day Care Centres	Grama Panchayat	ICDS services
Balwadis	Grama Panchayat	Pre-school education
Government Primary Schools (both upper and lower)	Grama Panchayat	Elementary education
Office of the Assistant Engineer	Grama Panchayat	One AE office for two GPs
Tribal Extension Office	Grama Panchayat	Tribal development services
Tribal Nursery Schools	Grama Panchayat	Tribal education
Village Extension Office	Grama Panchayat	Rural development support
Fisheries Sub Centres	Grama Panchayat	Fisheries support services
Institutions transferred to Block Panchayats
Assistant Executive Engineer (AEE) Office	Block Panchayat	Technical and engineering works
Assistant Director of Agriculture Office	Block Panchayat	Agricultural development support
Child Development Office	Block Panchayat	ICDS administration
Government Taluk Hospital	Block Panchayat	If located in block panchayat area.
Community Health Centre (CHCs)	Block Panchayat	Secondary level health services
Dairy Extension Office	Block Panchayat	Dairy development
Scheduled Caste Development Office	Block Panchayat	SC welfare programmes
Industrial Extension Office	Block Panchayat	Industrial promotion
Block Development Office	Block Panchayat	Block-level administration
Veterinary Poly Clinic	Block Panchayat	Advanced veterinary care
Institutions transferred to District Panchayats
Government Higher Secondary Schools	District Panchayat	Secondary education institutions in rural areas of the district
District Hospitals	District Panchayat	Major healthcare institutions
District Agro Farms	District Panchayat	Agricultural development
State Seed Farms	District Panchayat	Seed production facilities
Coconut Nursery	District Panchayat	Plantation development
Government Commercial Institutions	District Panchayat	Commercial training centres
Government Institute of Fashion Designing	District Panchayat	Skill development training
Industrial Training Institutes	District Panchayat	Vocational education
District Ayurvedic Hospital	District Panchayat	AYUSH tertiary care
District Homoeo Hospital	District Panchayat	AYUSH tertiary care
District Geriatric Centre	District Panchayat	Elderly care services
Institutions transferred to Municipalities / Municipal Corporations
Krishi Bhavan and allied offices	Municipality / Corporation	Agricultural development
Government Higher Secondary Schools	Municipality / Corporation	Higher secondary education
Government Vocational Higher Secondary Schools	Municipality / Corporation	Vocational education
Government High Schools	Municipality / Corporation	
Government Primary Schools	Municipality / Corporation	Primary education
Government Ayurveda Hospitals	Municipality / Corporation	
Government Homeo Dispenseries	Municipality / Corporation	
Government General Hospitals	Municipality / Corporation	
Taluk Headquarters Hospitals (where applicable)	Municipality / Corporation	If within municipal limits.
Urban Public Health Centres (UPHCs)	Municipality / Corporation	
Government Vetenery Poly Clinics	Municipality / Corporation	Animal husbandry development
Fisheries Sub Centres	Municipality / Corporation	
Fisheries Field Offices	Municipality / Corporation	
Anganawadis / Balawadis /	Municipality / Corporation	ICDS
Dairy Extension Offices	Municipality / Corporation	
Local hatcheries	Municipality / Corporation	
Prematric Hostels for SC & ST Students	Municipality / Corporation	

== Local body elections results ==
- **Bold** indicates most wins

2025 Kerala local elections
Local self-government body	Local Bodies in lead					Total
Local self-government body	LDF	UDF	NDA	Others	Tie	Total
**Grama Panchayats**	341	**504**	26	6	64	941
**Block Panchayats**	63	**79**	0	0	10	152
**District Panchayats**	**7**	**7**	0	0	0	14
**Municipalities**	28	**55**	2	1	1	86
**Corporations**	1	**4**	1	0	0	6

2020 Kerala local elections
Local self-government body	Local Bodies won				Total
Local self-government body	LDF	UDF	Others	Tie	Total
**Gram Panchayats**	**514**	321	42	64	941
**Block Panchayats**	**108**	38	0	6	152
**District Panchayats**	**11**	3	0	0 (Note: The ties were later resolved, LDF now control 11 and UDF controls 3 district panchayats. Refer Aftermath section)	14
**Municipalities**	**43**	41	2	0 (Note: The ties were later resolved and LDF now control 43 municipalities and UDF controls 41. Refer Aftermath section)	86
**Corporations**	**5**	1	0	0	6

2015 Kerala local elections
Local self-government body	Local Bodies won				Total
Local self-government body	LDF	UDF	NDA	Others	Total
Gram Panchayats	**549**	365	14	13	941
Block Panchayats	**90**	61	0	1	152
District Panchayats	7	7	0	0	14
Municipalities	**44**	41	1	0	87
Corporations	**4**	2	0	0	6

== Extent of Decentralization ==
The extent of decentralization and its nature can be gauged from the following facts:

- In the health sector all institutions other than medical colleges and big regional speciality hospitals have been placed under the control of the local governments. Kerala's public health care system has undergone tremendous decentralisation. Institutions for providing public health care, such as primary health centres (PHCs), community health centres (CHCs), taluk hospitals (THs), and district hospitals (DHs), have been given to local governments. District hospitals are run by district panchayats, taluk hospitals by block panchayats, taluk headquarters hospitals (THQHs) by municipalities, and primary health centres (PHCs) by panchayats. Community health centres (CHCs) are controlled by block panchayats. Urban primary health centres are managed by the respective urban local bodies. Management of community health centres and taluk hospitals within the municipal area in all systems of medicine is the responsibility of the respective municipality.
- In the Education sector, in rural areas the upper primary schools, high schools and higher secondary schools have been transferred to the District Panchayats and the primary schools have been transferred to Gram Panchayats; in urban areas, all government schools have been transferred to the urban local governments. As part of this initiative, urban local bodies, such as Corporations and municipalities, have been entrusted with the management and administration of all schools within their respective limits. This includes lower primary schools, upper primary schools, high schools, and higher secondary schools. Under this model, the urban local bodies take direct responsibility for the administration, infrastructure development, and overall management of all schools in their jurisdiction. Local governments have control over the overall functioning of schools, including infrastructure development and day-to-day operations. However, the recruitment, appointment, and payment of teachers and staffs remain under the jurisdiction of the general education department of the state government.
- The entire responsibility of poverty alleviation has gone to the local governments; all the centrally sponsored anti-poverty programmes are planned and implemented through them.
- As regards Social welfare, barring statutory functions relating to juvenile justice, the entire functions have gone to local governments. The ICDS is fully implemented by Village Panchayats and Urban Local Governments. Care of the disabled, to a substantial degree has become a local government responsibility.
- In the Agriculture and allied sectors, the de facto and de jure local government functions are Agricultural extension including farmer oriented support for increasing production and productivity, Watershed management and minor irrigation, Dairy development, Animal Husbandry including veterinary care & Inland fisheries.
- Barring highways and major district roads, connectivity has become local government responsibility.
- The whole of sanitation and most of rural water supply have moved over to local governments.
- Promotion of tiny, cottage and small industries is mostly with the local governments.
- All the welfare pensions are administered by the local governments.

== Present scenario ==
In short, most of the responsibilities relating to human and social development have been passed down to local governments. Welfare and poverty reduction are now largely dependent on local governments who also have considerable area of responsibility in the primary sector.

Local infrastructure creation is also largely in the domain of Panchayats and Nagarapalikas. Critical institutions of public service like hospitals, schools, anganwadis, veterinary institutions, Krishi Bhawans, hostels for Scheduled Castes and Care institutions for different disadvantaged groups have been transferred to local governments on as is where is condition. The responsibility of local governments which are typical of a non-plan nature in respect of these institutions include -

1. routine and heavy maintenance of infrastructure
2. upkeep and maintenance of equipment
3. replenishment of consumables
4. administrative charges relating to telephone, water, electricity, fuel etc.
5. noon-meal cost in schools.

== Proposed reforms ==
The Second Administrative Reforms Commission, set up on 31 August 2005 to prepare a detailed blue print for revamping the public administration system, suggested measures to achieve a proactive, responsive, accountable, sustainable and efficient administration at all levels of the country in the country, including the local government system, submitted its sixth report exclusively on local governance under the title Local Governance: An Inspiring Journey into the future . A brief summary of the report is there in the article

== Kerala Grama Panchayat Association ==
Kerala has a Grama Panchayath Association, formed under the Kerala Government Order No 85191/pt.sppl.1/66 & R D D on 29 December 1966 as an association of Grama Panchayaths. All Grama Panchayaths are affiliated to the Grama Panchayath Association. The Kerala Grama Panchayath Association has responsibility in strengthening decentralization process and local governance in Kerala. For the purpose, the association organizes necessary research activities, Studies, action Researches, some study models and conduct discussions, seminars, training etc., on issues confronting panchayaths in the state.

== E-Governance ==
=== E-District ===
Kerala E-District project intends to provide Government services to citizens through Common Service Centers (CSC) which are accessible. Services from different departments are brought under one umbrella at any CSC. Some of the services are also made available through an online portal. It utilizes backend computerization to e-enable the delivery of services and ensures transparency and uniform application of rules. The project involves integrated and seamless delivery of services to the public by automation, integration and incorporating Business Process Re-Engineering (BPR) where ever required. In a nutshell E-District is a tailor-made program for minimizing effort and time.

=== E-Gram ===
Honourable Chief Minister of Kerala Shri. Oommen Chandy has declared Pampakuda panchayat, Ernakulam as the first digital panchayat in Kerala on 28 June 2014. Pampakuda panchayat has achieved this feat by digitalizing over 18,000 citizens' survey data with the help of E-Gram, a software built by a private IT company operating in Technolodge Piravom.

E-Gram is a cloud based platform built exclusively for Gram Panchayats and is a data analytic tool which stores and analyses all information regarding people in a panchayat. E-Gram generates real-time analytics on population, literacy rate, male-female ratio, poverty threshold, internet penetration, access to electricity, access to clean water, healthcare etc. E-Gram's objective is to make panchayats more efficient, transparent and symbols of modernity by leveraging ICT at the cutting edge level to ensure transparency and accountability in their functioning through disclosure of information, social audit, efficient delivery of services and improving internal processes and management of panchayats. E-Gram has built-in SMS functionality which helps interact with people faster. This helps panchayats to roll out benefits, announcements, or even acknowledgement receipts for certificates in Malayalam. This automated SMS service can also send reminder SMSs to citizens who are due to pay their taxes.

== See also ==
- Administrative reforms in Kerala
- Gram panchayat
- District Planning in Kerala
- Municipalities of Kerala
- NREGS (Kerala)
- Peoples Planning in Kerala
- Local government in Maharashtra
