= List of urban local bodies in Kerala =

Kerala has an urbanisation rate of 47.42%, as compared to the national rate of 31.16%, making it the 2nd most urbanised major state in India. Within Kerala, the rate of urbanisation varied from 3.9% in Wayanad district to 68.1% in Ernakulam district. Municipalities are the urban local governments that deal with civic functions and local development functions in the municipal area. The state of Kerala has 87 municipalities and six municipal corporations. With 13 municipalities, the Ernakulam district has the most municipalities in the state.

At the state government level, the Local Self Government Department (LSGD) is responsible for policy formulation and administration. The Department of Urban Affairs, functioning under the LSGD, oversees the administration of Municipalities and Municipal Corporations (collectively referred to as Urban Local Bodies) in Kerala. The Department of Urban Affairs with the Director (Urban) as the head functions as the controlling authority of entire Urban Local Bodies in their working.

Municipalities in Kerala

== History ==
The urban councils of Kerala date back to the 17th century when the Dutch Malabar established the municipality of Fort Kochi. In 1664, the municipality of Fort Kochi was established by Dutch Malabar, making it the first municipality in Indian subcontinent, which got dissolved when the Dutch authority got weaker in 18th century. However, the first modern kind of municipalities were formed in the state in 1866 in Malabar District. In 1866, Fort Kochi municipality was reestablished. Kannur, Thalassery, Kozhikode, Palakkad, and Fort Kochi, which were parts of Malabar District until 1956, were made the first modern municipalities of Kerala on 1 November 1866, according to the Madras Act 10 of 1865 (Amendment of the Improvements in Towns act 1850) of the British Indian Empire.

== Enactment of the 74th Constitutional Amendment Act, 1992 ==
The 74th Constitutional Amendment Act, 1992 provided for a national framework for municipal governance in the country, and Kerala has been following that pattern since 1994. Consequent to this amendment, several changes have occurred in the functions, powers, and responsibilities of the municipalities, and the states had to make necessary amendments to the legislation on the local governments in the respective states. The Kerala Municipalities Act of 1994, enacted as per the constitutional amendment, governs the pattern, functions and services of the municipalities in Kerala. The act, which was integrated for the municipalities and corporations in the state, laid out the constitution of the town panchayats, municipal councils, and municipal corporations.

Prior to this, the urban areas of Kerala were governed by the following acts, which were repealed when the Kerala Municipality Act, 1994 was introduced:

- Kerala Municipalities Act, 1960
- Kerala Municipal Corporations Act, 1961
- Guruvayur Township Act, 1960

Hence, instead of having separate acts for municipal corporations and other types of municipal bodies, from 1994 Kerala has the same act to govern all its municipal bodies. Since then, the structure of municipal bodies has essentially remained the same, even though the urban areas have multiplied. The 74th amendment to the Constitution of India resulted in increased roles for the municipalities in every state in India, where they have been perceived to be great contributors to the social and economic development of the country, as they are the level of government that is closest to the citizens.

== Structure ==
The Kerala Municipality Act 1994 envisage creation of three kinds of urban local governments

- Town panchayats for transitional areas.
- Municipalities for less urbanised areas and
- Municipal corporations for more urbanised areas.

Kerala has not created any town panchayats so far.

== Functions ==
The functions of the municipalities are enlisted as schedule appended to Kerala Municipality Act. The functions can be divided into civic functions and development functions in areas of agriculture, industry, health, education etc.

Their mandatory responsibilities include urban planning and building control; protection and maintenance of public places, roads and water bodies; solid and liquid waste management; sanitation, street lighting and public infrastructure facilities; public health and food safety regulation; prevention and control of communicable diseases; registration of births and deaths; environmental protection; and implementation of State and national programmes.

In addition to these essential civic duties, municipalities also undertake general functions such as community mobilisation, awareness activities, disaster relief support and promotion of social welfare initiatives.

They are further entrusted with sectoral development responsibilities in areas such as housing, water supply, education, public health, social welfare, poverty alleviation, Scheduled Caste and Scheduled Tribe development, small-scale industries, agriculture, fisheries, sports, culture and disaster management.

== Functionaries ==
The municipality is administered by an elected municipal council headed by the Municipal Chairperson and functions through six Standing Committees—Finance, Development, Welfare, Public Works, Education, and Health. Each of these committees is chaired by an elected member. Elected councillors and officers are the other functionaries. Two types of officers now exist – officers belonging to the municipality as full-time officers and officers transferred to the municipality from the state government.

The Municipal Chairperson leads the municipality, while the Municipal Secretary serves as the chief administrative officer.

=== Elected functionaries ===
- Chairperson
  - Head of the Municipality.
  - Elected from among the councilors
  - Presides over Municipal Council meetings.
  - Leads policy formulation and implementation.
- Vice-Chairperson
  - Assists the Chairperson.
  - Acts on behalf of the Chairperson in their absence.
  - Elected from among the councilors
- Standing Committee Chairpersons
  - Chaired by elected councillors, with each Chairperson elected from among the members of the municipal council.
  - Lead specific committees like:
    - Finance
    - Public Works
    - Development
    - Welfare
    - Health and Education
- Municipal Councillors
  - Elected from each municipal ward.
  - Form the Municipal Council.
  - Participate in decision-making and budget approval.

=== Appointed Functionaries ===
- Municipal Secretary
  - Chief executive officer of the Municipality.
  - Appointed by the State Government
  - Implements council decisions.
  - Belongs to the Municipal Common Service.
- Engineers (Civil, Electrical, etc.)
  - Plan and execute infrastructure projects.
- Health Officer / Sanitary Inspector
  - Supervise sanitation and public health.
- Revenue Officer
  - Manage municipal taxes and revenue.
- Accounts Officer / Accountant
  - Maintain financial records and prepare budgets.
- Clerical and Support Staff
  - Includes clerks, assistants, overseers, and other staff.

== Ward committees ==
The Kerala Municipality Act, 1994 mandates the establishment of ward committees in each ward of the municipality. In case the municipality has less than one lakh population, then every person from the ward on the electoral roll becomes a member of the committee. In case the population of the municipality is more than one lakh, then the following become the members of the ward committee:

- the councillor of the ward;
- fifteen persons to be elected in the manner prescribed, from among the members of the resident's association of that ward, which are registered in the municipality;
- twenty members to be elected in the manner prescribed from among the members of the registered neighbourhood groups of that ward which are registered in the municipality;
- one person each nominated by every political party having representation in the municipality;
- the heads of all recognised educational institutions functioning in that ward;
- twenty persons nominated jointly by the chairperson and councillor of the ward

In both cases, the local councillor is the chairperson of the Ward committee. The Kerala Municipality (Constitution of ward Committee and Procedure for Meeting) Rules, 1995 provides further rules for the setting up and functioning of these committees. Ward committees have been set up in Kerala and are regularly cited as a good example of functioning micro level urban governance in India. Ward committees played an important role in combating the spread of COVID-19 in Kerala.

== List of Municipalities in Kerala ==
Municipalities in Kerala
Sl.No.	Municipality	Year of formation	Wards (2025)	Population (2011)	Area (km^{2})	Density (km^{2)}	Grade	District
1	Neyyattinkara	NA	46	70,840	28.78	2,461	Grade 1	Thiruvananthapuram
2	Nedumangad	NA	42	60,161	32.53	1,849	Grade 1	Thiruvananthapuram
3	Attingal	NA	32	37,382	16.87	2,216	Grade 2	Thiruvananthapuram
4	Varkala	NA	34	40,048	15.42	2,597	Grade 2	Thiruvananthapuram
5	Punalur	NA	36	46,659	34.45	1,354	Grade 2	Kollam
6	Karunagappally	2010	37	49,604	18.65	2,660	Grade 2	Kollam
7	Paravur	NA	32	37,245	16.19	2,300	Grade 2	Kollam
8	Kottarakkara	2015	30	29,788	17.39	1,713	Grade 2	Kollam
9	Thiruvalla	1919	39	52,883	27.15	1,948	Grade 1	Pathanamthitta
10	Pathanamthitta	1978	33	37,545	23.50	1,598	Grade 2	Pathanamthitta
11	Adoor	1990	29	29,165	20.42	1,428	Grade 2	Pathanamthitta
12	Pandalam	2015	34	42,793	28.42	1,506	Grade 2	Pathanamthitta
13	Alappuzha	NA	53	174,164	46.20	3,770	Grade 1	Alappuzha
14	Kayamkulam	1921	45	68,634	21.79	3,150	Grade 1	Alappuzha
15	Cherthala	NA	36	45,827	16.19	2,831	Grade 1	Alappuzha
16	Mavelikkara	1919	28	26,421	12.65	2,089	Grade 2	Alappuzha
17	Chengannur	1980	27	23,466	14.60	1,607	Grade 2	Alappuzha
18	Haripad	2015	30	30,977	19.24	1,610	Grade 3	Alappuzha
19	Kottayam	1894	53	136,812	55.40	2,469	Grade 1	Kottayam
20	Changanassery	1920	37	47,685	13.50	3,532	Grade 1	Kottayam
21	Pala	1947	26	22,056	16.06	1,373	Grade 1	Kottayam
22	Vaikom	1919	27	23,245	8.73	2,663	Grade 2	Kottayam
23	Ettumanoor	2015	36	51,129	27.80	1,829	Grade 3	Kottayam
24	Erattupetta	2015	29	34,814	18.29	1,903	Grade 3	Kottayam
25	Thodupuzha	NA	38	52,025	35.43	1,468	Grade 1	Idukki
26	Kattappana	2015	35	42,646	52.77	808	Grade 3	Idukki
27	Thrippunithura	NA	53	92,522	29.17	3,172	Grade 1	Ernakulam
28	Thrikkakara	2010	48	65,984	28.10	2,348	Grade 1	Ernakulam
29	Kalamassery	NA	46	71,038	27.00	2,631	Grade 1	Ernakulam
30	Perumbavoor	NA	29	28,105	13.61	2,065	Grade 1	Ernakulam
31	Aluva	NA	26	22,428	7.14	3,141	Grade 1	Ernakulam
32	Muvattupuzha	NA	30	30,397	13.18	2,306	Grade 2	Ernakulam
33	Kothamangalam	NA	33	38,837	40.04	970	Grade 2	Ernakulam
34	North Paravur	NA	30	31,493	9.02	3,492	Grade 2	Ernakulam
35	Angamaly	NA	31	33,465	20.45	1,633	Grade 2	Ernakulam
36	Maradu	2010	35	44,704	12.35	3,620	Grade 2	Ernakulam
37	Eloor	2010	32	25,297	11.21	2,257	Grade 2	Ernakulam
38	Piravom	2015	28	27,229	29.36	927	Grade 3	Ernakulam
39	Koothattukulam	2015	26	17,523	23.18	756	Grade 3	Ernakulam
40	Irinjalakuda	1936	43	62,521	33.57	1,862	Grade 1	Thrissur
41	Kunnamkulam	NA	39	54,071	34.18	1,582	Grade 1	Thrissur
42	Chalakudy	NA	37	49,525	25.23	1,963	Grade 2	Thrissur
43	Kodungallur	NA	46	70,868	29.24	2,424	Grade 2	Thrissur
44	Guruvayur	NA	46	67,006	29.66	2,259	Grade 2	Thrissur
45	Chavakkad	NA	33	39,095	12.41	3,150	Grade 2	Thrissur
46	Wadakkancherry	2015	42	61,341	51.56	1,190	Grade 3	Thrissur
47	Palakkad	1866	53	131,019	26.60	4,926	Grade 1	Palakkad
48	Chittur-Thathamangalam	NA	30	32,298	14.71	2,196	Grade 2	Palakkad
49	Ottappalam	NA	39	53,792	32.68	1,646	Grade 2	Palakkad
50	Shornur	NA	35	43,528	32.34	1,346	Grade 2	Palakkad
51	Mannarkkad	2015	30	34,839	33.01	1,055	Grade 3	Palakkad
52	Pattambi	2015	29	28,632	15.84	1,808	Grade 3	Palakkad
53	Cherupulassery	2015	33	41,267	32.00	1,290	Grade 3	Palakkad
54	Malappuram	1970	45	68,127	33.61	2,027	Grade 1	Malappuram
55	Manjeri	1978	53	97,102	53.06	1,830	Grade 1	Malappuram
56	Ponnani	1977	53	90,491	24.82	3,646	Grade 1	Malappuram
57	Tirur	1971	40	56,058	16.55	3,387	Grade 1	Malappuram
58	Perinthalmanna	1990	37	49,723	34.41	1,445	Grade 2	Malappuram
59	Kottakkal	2010	35	44,382	20.45	2,170	Grade 2	Malappuram
60	Nilambur	2010	36	46,366	30.79	1,506	Grade 2	Malappuram
61	Kondotty	2015	41	59,256	30.93	1,916	Grade 3	Malappuram
62	Valanchery	2015	34	40,318	21.90	1,841	Grade 3	Malappuram
63	Tanur	2015	45	69,534	19.49	3,568	Grade 3	Malappuram
64	Parappanangadi	2015	46	71,239	22.25	3,202	Grade 3	Malappuram
65	Tirurangadi	2015	40	56,632	17.73	3,194	Grade 3	Malappuram
66	Vatakara	1901	48	75,295	21.32	3,532	Grade 1	Kozhikode
67	Koyilandy	1934	46	71,873	29.05	2,474	Grade 1	Kozhikode
68	Koduvally	2015	37	48,687	23.85	2,041	Grade 2	Kozhikode
69	Ramanattukara	2015	32	35,937	11.70	3,072	Grade 3	Kozhikode
70	Feroke	2015	39	54,074	15.54	3,480	Grade 3	Kozhikode
71	Payyoli	2015	37	49,470	22.34	2,214	Grade 3	Kozhikode
72	Mukkam	2015	34	40,670	31.20	1,304	Grade 3	Kozhikode
73	Kalpetta	NA	30	31,580	40.74	775	Grade 2	Wayanad
74	Mananthavady	2015	37	47,974	80.10	599	Grade 3	Wayanad
75	Sultan Bathery	2015	36	45,417	102.24	444	Grade 3	Wayanad
76	Thalassery	1866	53	92,558	23.96	3,863	Grade 1	Kannur
77	Taliparamba	1990	35	44,247	18.96	2,334	Grade 1	Kannur
78	Payyanur	1990	46	72,111	54.63	1,320	Grade 1	Kannur
79	Mattanur	1992	36	47,078	54.32	867	Grade 2	Kannur
80	Kuthuparamba	1990	29	29,619	16.76	1,767	Grade 2	Kannur
81	Anthoor	2015	29	28,218	24.12	1,170	Grade 3	Kannur
82	Iritty	2015	34	40,369	45.84	881	Grade 3	Kannur
83	Panoor	2015	41	55,216	28.53	1,935	Grade 3	Kannur
84	Sreekandapuram	2015	31	33,489	68.72	487	Grade 3	Kannur
85	Kasaragod	1966	39	54,172	16.69	3,246	Grade 1	Kasaragod
86	Kanhangad	1984	47	73,536	39.54	1,860	Grade 1	Kasaragod
87	Nileshwaram	2010	34	39,752	26.23	1,515	Grade 2	Kasaragod

== See also ==
- List of municipal corporations in Kerala
- Local Governance in Kerala
- Local Self Government Department (LSGD), GoK
- Municipal Governance in India
- Non-Municipal Census Towns in Kerala
