= Local Self Government Department (Kerala) =

Department responsible for local administration and decentralised governance in Kerala

Local Self Government Department, Government of Kerala

Agency overview
- Jurisdiction: Kerala, India
- Headquarters: Government Secretariat, Thiruvananthapuram
- Annual budget: ₹11,192.8337 crore (US$1.2 billion) (2026–27, revised)
- Minister responsible: K.M. Shaji, Minister for Local Self Governments
- Agency executives: Tinku Biswal IAS, Principal Secretary to Government; Shanavas.S IAS, Special Secretary; Divya S. Iyer IAS, Principal Director of LSGD; Suraj Shaji IAS, Director (Urban); Apurva Tripathi IAS, Director (Rural); Sandeep K G, Chief Engineer; Shiji E Chandran, Chief Town Planner
- Child agencies: Clean Kerala Company; Kudumbashree; Kerala Institute of Local Administration (KILA); Information Kerala Mission
- Website: lsgd.kerala.gov.in

The Local Self Government Department (LSGD) is one of the administrative departments under the Government of Kerala. It is responsible for decentralised governance, civic administration, and the functioning of local governments in Kerala, including Municipal Corporations, Municipalities, and the three-tier Panchayat system.

== Leadership ==
LSGD Secretariat

The department is headed by a Cabinet Minister of the Government of Kerala. The incumbent Minister is K. M. Shaji.

Administratively, the department is headed by the Principal Secretary to Government (LSGD), supported by Special Secretaries, Additional Secretaries, Joint Secretaries, Deputy Secretaries and Under Secretaries along with officers and staff posted in the Secretariat. The functions of departments is organised into various sections, under a section officer (SO), and assisted by assistant section officers, assistants and other clerical staffs.
The LSGD Secretariat formulates policies and advises the Government. It also coordinates and exercises administrative control over Line Departments, Statutory Institutions, and other agencies.

Principal Directorate

Principal Directorate is the apex directorate of the Kerala Local Self Government Department, responsible for coordinating and administering the unified Local Self Government services across the state.

The Principal Directorate, established in 2018, is headed by the Principal Director, a senior IAS officer, and is assisted by the Director (Urban) and Director (Rural), both IAS cadre officers. The Country and Town Planning Department, LSGD Engineering Wing, and Performance Audit Wing function under the Principal Directorate and are headed by the Chief Town Planner, Chief Engineer, and State Performance Audit Officer, respectively.

=== Senior Officials ===
- Tinku Biswal IAS – Principal Secretary (Local Self Government)
- T.V. Anupama IAS - Special Secretary to Government
- Adeela Abdulla IAS - Special Secretary to Government
- Geromic George IAS – Principal Director, Local Self Government Department
- Smt. Apurva Tripathi IAS – Director (Rural)
- Suraj Shaji IAS – Director (Urban)

== Functions ==
- Administration and oversight of Municipal Corporations, Municipalities, and Panchayats.
- Urban governance, sanitation, and waste management through local bodies.
- Implementation of decentralised planning through Panchayat Raj and Municipality Acts.
- Implementation of poverty alleviation and community development programmes through Kudumbashree.
- Granting building permits, trade licences and delivery of local services.
- Implementation of e-governance through Information Kerala Mission (IKM).

== Line Departments / Directorates ==
The following is the major functional and administrative wings;

- Principal Directorate LSGD
  - Directorate of Panchayats
  - Directorate of Urban Affairs
  - Commissionerate of Rural Development (Rural Development Department)
  - LSGD Engineering Wing
  - Department of Town and Country Planning
  - LSGD Performance Audit Wing

== Aligned Institutions ==
The following missions, corporations and bodies function under the department:

- Local Government Commission
- Kudumbashree
- Information Kerala Mission (IKM)
- Suchitwa Mission
- LIFE Mission
- Kerala Institute of Local Administration (KILA)
- Kerala State Planning Board
- MGNREGS Mission
- Kerala Solid Waste Management Project (KSWMP)
- Smart Cities Mission
- AMRUT Mission
- IMPACT Kerala
- Clean Kerala Company Limited (CKCL)
- KURDFC
- Capital Region Development Program (CRDP)
- Kerala Rural Employment and Welfare Society

== Statutory Institutions ==
The following institutions function independently in the discharge of their duties, while their administrative control rests with the department.

- Kerala State Election Commission
- State Finance Commission
- Delimitation Commission
- Ombudsman for Local Governments
- Tribunal for Local Self-Governments
- Kerala Real-estate Regulatory Authority
- Thiruvananthapuram Development Authority (TRIDA)
- Greater Cochin Development Authority (GCDA)

== E-Governance ==
- K-Smart: Kerala Solutions for Managing Administrative Reformation and Transformation (K-Smart) is an integrated e-Governance platform of the Local Self Government Department (LSGD), developed by the Information Kerala Mission (IKM) to provide local government services through a unified digital system. It integrates services such as civil registration, property tax, building permits, licences, finance, grievance redressal and file management.
- Sulekha: Sulekha is the plan formulation and monitoring software for the LSGD, developed by Information Kerala Mission.
- Sakarma: For managing meetings, agendas and minutes of local government bodies in Kerala.
- Know Your Land: Know Your Land is a GIS-based service providing land information and development regulations.
- Haritha Mithram: Haritha Mithram is a digital waste-management monitoring software for local governments.

== See also ==
- Local government in Kerala
- Government of Kerala
