= List of municipal corporations in Keralam =

Kerala state is divided into 6 municipal corporations and 87 municipalities for urban governence. Compared to municipalities, municipal corporations have greater administrative authority and financial powers.

At the state government level, the Local Self Government Department (LSGD) is responsible for policy formulation and administration. The Department of Urban Affairs, functioning under the LSGD, oversees the administration of Municipal Corporations in Kerala. The Department of Urban Affairs with the Director (Urban) as the head functions as the controlling authority of entire Urban Local Bodies in their working.

Municipal corporations in Kerala

== History ==
The urban councils of Kerala date back to the 17th century when the Dutch Malabar established the municipality of Fort Kochi. In 1664, the municipality of Fort Kochi was established by Dutch Malabar, making it the first municipality in Indian subcontinent, which got dissolved when the Dutch authority got weaker in 18th century. However, the first modern kind of municipalities were formed in the state in 1866 in Malabar District. In 1866, Fort Kochi municipality was reestablished. Kannur, Thalassery, Kozhikode, Palakkad, and Fort Kochi, which were parts of Malabar District until 1956, were made the first modern municipalities of Kerala on 1 November 1866, according to the Madras Act 10 of 1865 (Amendment of the Improvements in Towns act 1850) of the British Indian Empire. The Thiruvananthapuram Municipality came into existence in 1920. After two decades, during the reign of Sree Chithira Thirunal, Thiruvananthapuram Municipality was converted into Corporation on 30 October 1940, making it the oldest Municipal Corporation of Kerala. The first Municipal Corporation formed after the independence of India as well as the second-oldest Municipal Corporation of the state is Kozhikode Municipal Corporation established in the year 1962.

== Functions ==
The functions of the municipalities are enlisted as schedule appended to Kerala Municipality Act. The functions can be divided into civic functions and development functions in areas of agriculture, industry, health, education etc.

Their mandatory responsibilities include urban planning and building control; protection and maintenance of public places, roads and water bodies; solid and liquid waste management; sanitation, street lighting and public infrastructure facilities; public health and food safety regulation; prevention and control of communicable diseases; registration of births and deaths; environmental protection; and implementation of State and national programmes.

In addition to these essential civic duties, municipalities also undertake general functions such as community mobilisation, awareness activities, disaster relief support and promotion of social welfare initiatives.

They are further entrusted with sectoral development responsibilities in areas such as housing, water supply, education, public health, social welfare, poverty alleviation, Scheduled Caste and Scheduled Tribe development, small-scale industries, agriculture, fisheries, sports, culture and disaster management.

== Municipal Corporations ==
Municipal Corporations in Kerala
No.	City	Year of formation	Wards	Population (2011)	Density/km^{2}	Area (km^{2})	District	Images
1	Thiruvananthapuram	1940	101	955,494	4,447	214.86	Thiruvananthapuram	
2	Kozhikode	1962	76	609,214	5,149	118.312	Kozhikode	
3	Kochi	1967	76	677,381	7,139	94.88	Ernakulam	
4	Kollam	2000	56	388,288	5,316	73.03	Kollam	
5	Thrissur	2000	56	315,596	3,111	101.42	Thrissur	
6	Kannur	2015	56	232,486	2,967	78.35	Kannur	

== See also ==
- Taluks of Kerala
- Municipalities of Kerala

== Sources ==
- Government of Kerala
- List Of Corporations And Municipalities of Kerala – www.c4civil.com
- Kerala at a glance
- Local Self Government Department, Government of Kerala
