= 1999 Indian general election in Kerala =

1999 Indian general election
- September–October 1999

20 seats
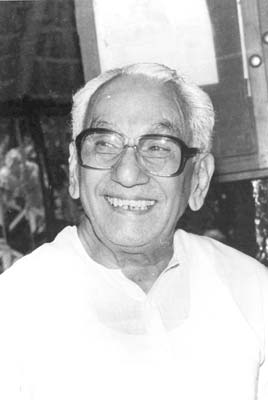

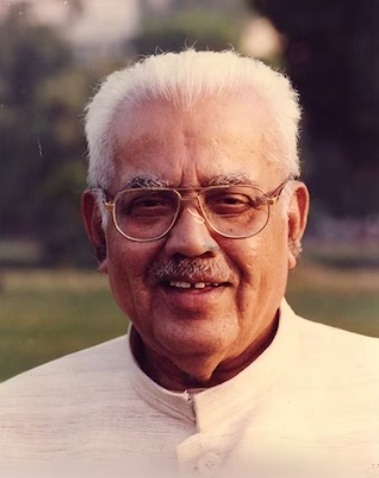
	First party	Second party
Leader	K. Karunakaran	E.K. Nayanar
Party	INC	CPI(M)
Alliance	UDF	LDF
Leader's seat	Mukundapuram	-
Last election	11	9
Seats won	11	9
Seat change	-	-
Percentage	46.9%	43.7%
Prime Minister before election
A. B. Vajpayee
BJP
Prime Minister after election
A. B. Vajpayee
BJP

The 1999 Indian general election was held to elect 20 members to the thirteenth Lok Sabha from Kerala. Indian National Congress-led United Democratic Front (UDF) won 11 seats, while the Left Democratic Front (LDF), led by Communist Party of India (Marxist) (CPI(M)) won the remaining 9 seats. Both coalitions won the same number of seats as in the previous election, held in the previous year. Turnout for the election was measured at 70.19% of the eligible population.

== Election schedule ==
The polling schedule for the 1999 General Elections was announced by the Chief Election Commissioner on 11 July 1999.

Poll event	Phase
Poll event	II (A)
Notification date	12 August 1999
Last date for filing nomination	19 August 1999
Scrutiny of nomination	20 August 1999
Last Date for withdrawal of nomination	23 August 1999
Date of poll	11 September 1999
Date of counting of votes/Result	6 October 1999

== Alliances and parties ==
UDF is a Kerala legislative alliance formed by INC veteran K. Karunakaran. LDF comprises primarily of CPI(M) and the CPI, forming the Left Front in the national level. National Democratic Alliance (NDA), led by Bharatiya Janata Party (BJP) contested in 19 seats.

=== United Democratic Front ===
No.	Party	Election Symbol	Seats contested
1.	Indian National Congress		17
2.	Indian Union Muslim League		2
3.	Kerala Congress (M)		1

=== Left Democratic Front ===
No.	Party	Election Symbol	Seats contested
1.	Communist Party of India (Marxist)	Key	12
2.	Communist Party of India	Star	4
3.	Kerala Congress		1
4.	Janata Dal (Secular) (Note: This Symbol was used by JD(S) until 2001)		1
5.	Independents		2

=== National Democratic Alliance ===
No.	Party	Election Symbol	Seats contested
1.	Bharatiya Janata Party		14
2.	Janata Dal (United)		5

== List of Candidates ==
Constituency		UDF		LDF		NDA	
#	Name	Party	Candidate	Party	Candidate	Party	Candidate
1	Kasaragod	INC	Khader Mangad	CPM	T. Govindan	BJP	P. K. Krishna Das
2	Cannanore	INC	M. Ramachandran	CPM	A. P. Abdullakutty	JD(U)	N. Hariharan
3	Badagara	INC	P. M. Suresh Babu	CPM	A. K. Premajam	BJP	O. K. Vasumaster
4	Calicut	INC	K. Muraleedharan	JD(S)	C. M. Ibrahim	BJP	P. C. Mohanan Master
5	Manjeri	IUML	E. Ahamed	CPM	I. T. Najeeb	JD(U)	K. Mohiyudheen
6	Ponnani	IUML	G. M. Banatwala	CPI	P. P. Suneer	BJP	K. Narayanan Master
7	Palghat	INC	M. T. Padma	CPM	N. N. Krishnadas	BJP	C. Uday Bhaskar
8	Ottapalam (SC)	INC	Pandalam Sudhakaran	CPM	S. Ajaya Kumar	BJP	P. M. Velayudhan
9	Trichur	INC	A. C. Jose	CPI	V. V. Raghavan	JD(U)	A. S. Radhakrishnan
10	Mukundapuram	INC	K. Karunakaran	CPM	E. M. Sreedharan		
11	Ernakulam	INC	George Eden	IND	Mani Vithayathil	BJP	T. D. Rajalakshmi
12	Muvattupuzha	KC(M)	P. C. Thomas	CPM	P. M. Ismail	BJP	V. V. Augustine
13	Kottayam	INC	P. C. Chacko	CPM	K. Suresh Kurup	BJP	K. R. Surendran
14	Idukki	INC	P. J. Kurien	KEC	K. Francis George	JD(U)	Tomy Cheruvally
15	Alleppey	INC	V. M. Sudheeran	CPM	Murali	BJP	T. Parameswaran Nair
16	Mavelikara	INC	Ramesh Chennithala	IND	Ninan Koshy	BJP	K. Raman Pillai
17	Adoor (SC)	INC	Kodikunnil Suresh	CPI	C. Surendran	BJP	K. Raveendranath
18	Quilon	INC	M. P. Gangadharan	CPM	P. Rajendran	JD(U)	Jayalekshmi
19	Chirayinkil	INC	M. I. Shanavas	CPM	Varkala Radhakrishnan	BJP	Padmakumar
20	Trivandrum	INC	V. S. Sivakumar	CPI	Kaniya Ramachandran	BJP	O. Rajagopal

== List of elected MPs ==
No.	Constituency	Name of Elected M.P.	Party affiliation
1	Kasaragod	T. Govindan	CPI(M)
2	Kannur	A. P. Abdullakutty	CPI(M)
3	Vatakara	A. K. Premajam	CPI(M)
4	Kozhikode	K. Muraleedharan	INC
5	Manjeri	E. Ahamed	IUML
6	Ponnani	G. M. Banatwala	IUML
7	Palakkad	N. N. Krishnadas	CPI(M)
8	Ottapalam	S. Ajaya Kumar	CPI(M)
9	Thrissur	A. C. Jose	INC
10	Mukundapuram	K. Karunakaran	INC
11	Ernakulam	George Eden	INC
12	Muvattupuzha	P. C. Thomas	KC(M)
13	Kottayam	K. Suresh Kurup	CPI(M)
14	Idukki	K. Francis George	KEC
15	Alappuzha	V. M. Sudheeran	INC
16	Mavelikkara	Ramesh Chennithala	INC
17	Adoor	Kodikunnil Suresh	INC
18	Kollam	P. Rajendran	CPI(M)
19	Chirayankil	Varkala Radhakrishnan	CPI(M)
20	Thiruvananthapuram	V. S. Sivakumar	INC

== Results ==
=== Performance of political parties ===
Vote Share by alliance
1. UDF (46.9%)
2. LDF (43.7%)
3. NDA (7.90%)
4. Other (1.50%)

No.	Party	Political Front	Seats	Votes	%Votes	±pp
1	Indian National Congress	UDF	8	60,51,905	39.40	▲0.73
2	Communist Party of India (Marxist)	LDF	4	42,90,986	27.90	▲6.90
3	Indian Union Muslim League	UDF	2	8,10,135	5.30	▲0.29
4	Kerala Congress (M)	UDF	1	3,57,402	2.30	▼0.10
5	Kerala Congress	LDF	1	3,65,313	2.40	▲0.20
6	Communist Party of India	LDF	0	11,64,157	7.60	▼0.72
7	Bharatiya Janata Party	NDA	0	10,08,047	6.60	▼1.42
8	Janata Dal (Secular)	LDF	0	3,33,023	2.20	new
9	Janata Dal (United)	NDA	0	2,06,950	1.30	new
10	Socialist Republican Party	none	0	30,779	0.2	new
11	Bahujan Samaj Party	none	0	14,331	0.1	Steady
12	Rashtriya Janata Dal	none	0	5,655	0.0	new
13	Shiv Sena	none	0	4,700	0.0	▼0.02
14	Ajeeya Bharat Party	none	0	2,556	0.0	new

=== By constituency ===
No.	Constituency	UDF candidate	Votes	%	Party	LDF candidate	Votes	%	Party	NDA candidate	Votes	%	Party	Winning alliance	Margin
1	Kasaragod	Khader Mangad	3,91,986	42.1%	INC	T. Govindan	4,23,564	45.5%	CPI(M)	P. K. Krishna Das	1,01,934	10.9%	BJP	LDF	31,578
2	Kannur	Mullappally Ramachandran	4,18,143	47.2%	INC	A. P. Abdullakutty	4,28,390	48.3%	CPI(M)	N. Hariharan	26,069	2.9%	JD(U)	LDF	10,247
3	Vatakara	P. M. Suresh Babu	3,78,511	43.9%	INC	A. K. Premajam	4,04,355	46.9%	CPI(M)	O. K. Vasu	62,593	7.3%	BJP	LDF	25,844
4	Kozhikode	K. Muraleedharan	3,83,425	46.4%	INC	C. M. Ibrahim	3,33,023	40.3%	JD(S)	P. C. Mohanan	83,862	10.1%	BJP	UDF	50,402
5	Manjeri	E. Ahammed	4,37,563	53.6%	IUML	I. T. Najeeb	3,14,152	38.5%	CPI(M)	Kalathingal Mohiyudheen	58,451	7.2%	JD(U)	UDF	1,23,411
6	Ponnani	G. M. Banatwalla	3,54,051	53.6%	IUML	P. P. Suneer	2,51,293	35.0%	CPI	K. Narayanan	66,427	9.6%	BJP	UDF	1,29,478
7	Palakkad	M. T. Padma	3,41,769	41.9%	INC	N. N. Krishnadas	3,72,536	45.7%	CPI(M)	C. Udai Bhasker	87,948	10.8%	BJP	LDF	30,767
8	Ottapalam	Pandalam Sudhakaran	3,46,043	44.1%	INC	S. Ajaya Kumar	3,59,758	45.9%	CPI(M)	P. M. Velayudhan	70,851	9.0%	BJP	LDF	13,715
9	Thrissur	A. C. Jose	3,43,793	40%	INC	V. V. Raghavan	3,32,161	46.7%	CPI	A. S. Radhakrishnan	44,354	6.0%	BJP	UDF	11,632
10	Mukundapuram	K. Karunakaran	3,97,156	50.1%	INC	E. M. Sreedharan	3,44,693	43.5%	CPI(M)	M. S. Muraleedharan	30,779	3.9%	SRP	UDF	52,463
11	Ernakulam	George Eden	3,94,058	38.4%	INC	Mani Vithayathil	2,82,753	49%	IND	T. D. Rajalakshmi	77,640	10.0%	BJP	UDF	1,11,305
12	Muvattupuzha	P. C. Thomas	3,57,402	51.6%	KC(M)	P. M. Ismail	2,80,463	40.5%	CPI(M)	V. V. Augustine	47,875	6.9%	BJP	UDF	76,939
13	Kottayam	P. C. Chacko	3,33,697	45.5%	INC	K. Suresh Kurup	3,44,296	46.9%	CPI(M)	K. R. Surendran	41,531	5.7%	BJP	LDF	10,599
14	Idukki	P. J. Kurian	3,56,015	45.7%	INC	K. Francis George	3,65,313	46.9%	KEC	Tomy Cheruvally	35,497	4.6%	JD(U)	LDF	9,298
15	Alappuzha	V. M. Sudheeran	3,92,700	49.5%	INC	Murali	3,57,606	45.1%	CPI(M)	Thiruvarppu Parameswaran Nair	27,682	3.5%	BJP	UDF	35,094
16	Mavelikkara	Ramesh Chennithala	3,10,455	46.5%	INC	Ninan Koshy	2,77,012	41.5%	IND	K. Raman Pillai	73,668	11.0%	BJP	UDF	33,443
17	Adoor	Kodikunnil Suresh	3,37,003	47.9%	INC	Chengara Surendran	3,14,997	44.8%	CPI	K. Raveendranath	43,926	6.2%	BJP	UDF	22,006
18	Kollam	M. P. Gangadharan	3,32,585	44.9%	INC	P. Rajendran	3,51,869	47.5%	CPI(M)	Jayalekshmi	42,579	5.7%	BJP	LDF	19,284
19	Chirayinkil	M. I. Shanavas	3,06,176	44.3%	INC	Varkala Radhakrishnan	3,09,304	44.8%	CPI(M)	Padmakumar	63,889	9.2%	BJP	LDF	3,128
20	Trivandrum	V. S. Sivakumar	2,88,390	38.1%	INC	Kaniyapuram Ramachandran	2,73,905	36.2%	CPI	O. Rajagopal	1,58,221	20.9%	BJP	UDF	14,485

== Post-election Union Council of Ministers from Kerala ==
#	Name	Constituency	Designation	Department	From	To	Party
1	P. C. Thomas	Muvattupuzha	MoS	Law and Justice	24 May 2003	22 May 2004	KC(M)

== Assembly segments wise lead of Parties ==
Party		Assembly segments
UDF	INC	71
UDF	IUML	13
UDF	KC(M)	7
UDF	Total	91
LDF	CPI(M)	35
LDF	CPI	8
LDF	JD(S)	1
LDF	KC	5
LDF	Independent	0
LDF	Total	49
Total		140

S.No	Name	Constituency	Winning Alliance	Runner-up Alliance	Leading Party	Margin
1	Manjeshwar	Kasaragod	UDF	NDA	INC	13942
2	Kasaragod	Kasaragod	UDF	NDA	INC	25859
3	Udma	Kasaragod	LDF	UDF	CPI(M)	191
4	Hosdurg	Kasaragod	LDF	UDF	CPI(M)	3555
5	Trikaripur	Kasaragod	LDF	UDF	CPI(M)	17241
6	Irikkur	Kannur	UDF	LDF	INC	11114
7	Payyannur	Kasaragod	LDF	UDF	CPI(M)	35188
8	Taliparamba	Kasaragod	LDF	UDF	CPI(M)	23321
9	Azhikode	Kannur	LDF	UDF	CPI(M)	17614
10	Kannur	Kannur	UDF	LDF	INC	15110
11	Edakkad	Kannur	LDF	UDF	CPI(M)	4584
12	Thalassery	Vadakara	LDF	UDF	CPI(M)	11532
13	Peringalam	Vadakara	LDF	UDF	CPI(M)	6987
14	Kuthuparamba	Kannur	LDF	UDF	CPI(M)	23634
15	Peravoor	Kannur	UDF	LDF	INC	2700
16	Mananthavady	Kannur	UDF	LDF	INC	6821
17	Badagara	Vadakara	LDF	UDF	CPI(M)	4328
18	Nadapuram	Vadakara	LDF	UDF	CPI(M)	8258
19	Meppayur	Vadakara	LDF	UDF	CPI(M)	1601
20	Quilandy	Vadakara	UDF	LDF	INC	7949
21	Perambra	Vadakara	LDF	UDF	CPI(M)	306
22	Balusseri	Calicut	LDF	UDF	JD(S)	7905
23	Koduvally	Calicut	UDF	LDF	INC	8837
24	Kozhikode I	Calicut	UDF	LDF	INC	8152
25	Kozhikode II	Calicut	UDF	LDF	INC	7186
26	Beypore	Manjeri	UDF	LDF	IUML	659
27	Kunnamangalam	Manjeri	UDF	LDF	IUML	4970
28	Thiruvambady	Calicut	UDF	LDF	INC	12096
29	Kalpetta	Calicut	UDF	LDF	INC	8862
30	Sultan'S Battery	Calicut	UDF	LDF	INC	13173
31	Wandoor	Manjeri	LDF	UDF	IUML	17080
32	Nilambur	Manjeri	LDF	UDF	IUML	14789
33	Manjeri	Manjeri	UDF	LDF	IUML	28607
34	Malappuram	Manjeri	UDF	LDF	IUML	28835
35	Kondotty	Manjeri	UDF	LDF	IUML	29187
36	Tirurangadi	Ponnani	UDF	LDF	IUML	26590
37	Tanur	Ponnani	UDF	LDF	IUML	33596
38	Tirur	Ponnani	UDF	LDF	IUML	11057
39	Ponnani	Ponnani	LDF	UDF	CPI	110
40	Kuttippuram	Ponnani	UDF	LDF	IUML	26077
41	Mankada	Ponnani	UDF	LDF	IUML	19733
42	Perinthalmanna	Ponnani	UDF	LDF	IUML	12752
43	Thrithala	Ottapalam	UDF	LDF	INC	1019
44	Pattambi	Ottapalam	UDF	LDF	INC	223
45	Ottapalam	Ottapalam	LDF	UDF	CPI(M)	11418
46	Sreekrishnapuram	Palghat	LDF	UDF	CPI(M)	6366
47	Mannarkkad	Palghat	UDF	LDF	INC	13940
48	Malampuzha	Palghat	LDF	UDF	CPI(M)	17161
49	Palghat	Palghat	UDF	LDF	INC	2940
50	Chittur	Palghat	LDF	UDF	CPI(M)	1992
51	Kollengode	Palghat	LDF	UDF	CPI(M)	8808
52	Coyalmannam	Ottapalam	LDF	UDF	CPI(M)	14159
53	Alathur	Palghat	LDF	UDF	CPI(M)	12595
54	Chelakara	Ottapalam	UDF	LDF	INC	2246
55	Wadakkanchery	Ottapalam	UDF	LDF	INC	7339
56	Kunnamkulam	Ottapalam	LDF	UDF	CPI(M)	1458
57	Cherpu	Trichur	LDF	UDF	CPI	5555
58	Trichur	Trichur	UDF	LDF	INC	3542
59	Ollur	Trichur	UDF	LDF	INC	4300
60	Kodakara	Trichur	UDF	LDF	INC	256
61	Chalakudi	Mukundapuram	UDF	LDF	INC	11722
62	Mala	Mukundapuram	UDF	LDF	INC	11313
63	Irinjalakuda	Mukundapuram	UDF	LDF	INC	93
64	Manalur	Trichur	UDF	LDF	INC	1929
65	Guruvayoor	Trichur	UDF	LDF	INC	8281
66	Nattika	Trichur	LDF	UDF	CPI	665
67	Kodungallur	Mukundapuram	LDF	UDF	CPI(M)	2720
68	Ankamali	Mukundapuram	UDF	LDF	INC	16913
69	Vadakkekara	Mukundapuram	UDF	LDF	INC	4009
70	Parur	Ernakulam	UDF	LDF	INC	5319
71	Narakkal	Ernakulam	UDF	LDF	INC	8771
72	Ernakulam	Ernakulam	UDF	LDF	INC	22075
73	Mattancherry	Ernakulam	UDF	LDF	INC	16930
74	Palluruthy	Ernakulam	UDF	LDF	INC	18376
75	Trippunithura	Ernakulam	UDF	LDF	INC	13819
76	Alwaye	Ernakulam	UDF	LDF	INC	26157
77	Perumbavoor	Mukundapuram	UDF	LDF	INC	11329
78	Kunnathunad	Muvattupuzha	UDF	LDF	KEC(M)	12788
79	Piravom	Muvattupuzha	UDF	LDF	KEC(M)	8202
80	Muvattupuzha	Muvattupuzha	UDF	LDF	KEC(M)	1656
81	Kothamangalam	Muvattupuzha	UDF	LDF	KEC(M)	11929
82	Thodupuzha	Idukki	LDF	UDF	KEC	3365
83	Devicolam	Idukki	LDF	UDF	KEC	3050
84	Idukki	Idukki	UDF	LDF	INC	418
85	Udumbanchola	Idukki	LDF	UDF	KEC	7094
86	Peermade	Idukki	LDF	UDF	KEC	229
87	Kanjirappally	Muvattupuzha	UDF	LDF	KEC(M)	11381
88	Vazhoor	Kottayam	LDF	UDF	CPI(M)	606
89	Changanacherry	Kottayam	UDF	LDF	INC	5803
90	Kottayam	Kottayam	LDF	UDF	CPI(M)	9901
91	Ettumanoor	Kottayam	LDF	UDF	CPI(M)	632
92	Puthuppally	Kottayam	LDF	UDF	CPI(M)	400
93	Poonjar	Muvattupuzha	UDF	LDF	KEC(M)	8962
94	Palai	Muvattupuzha	UDF	LDF	KEC(M)	22180
95	Kaduthuruthy	Kottayam	UDF	LDF	INC	7562
96	Vaikom	Kottayam	LDF	UDF	CPI(M)	11113
97	Aroor	Alleppey	UDF	LDF	INC	9428
98	Sherthalai	Alleppey	UDF	LDF	INC	3223
99	Mararikulam	Alleppey	UDF	LDF	INC	2084
100	Alleppey	Alleppey	UDF	LDF	INC	14044
101	Ambalapuzha	Alleppey	UDF	LDF	INC	3865
102	Kuttanad	Alleppey	UDF	LDF	INC	599
103	Haripad	Alleppey	UDF	LDF	INC	1141
104	Kayamkulam	Mavelikara	UDF	LDF	INC	5249
105	Thiruvalla	Mavelikara	UDF	LDF	INC	7720
106	Kallooppara	Mavelikara	UDF	LDF	INC	5990
107	Aranmula	Mavelikara	UDF	LDF	INC	4681
108	Chengannur	Mavelikara	UDF	LDF	INC	4400
109	Mavelikara	Mavelikara	UDF	LDF	INC	3639
110	Pandalam	Mavelikara	UDF	LDF	INC	1727
111	Ranni	Idukki	LDF	UDF	KEC	1742
112	Pathanamthitta	Idukki	UDF	LDF	INC	6338
113	Konni	Adoor	LDF	UDF	CPI	1473
114	Pathanapuram	Adoor	UDF	LDF	INC	8323
115	Punalur	Adoor	UDF	LDF	INC	7768
116	Chadayamangalam	Adoor	LDF	UDF	CPI	3608
117	Kottarakkara	Adoor	UDF	LDF	INC	8785
118	Neduvathur	Adoor	LDF	UDF	CPI	5063
119	Adoor	Adoor	UDF	LDF	INC	7621
120	Kunnathur	Quilon	LDF	UDF	CPI(M)	3778
121	Karunagappally	Quilon	LDF	UDF	CPI(M)	4147
122	Chavara	Quilon	LDF	UDF	CPI(M)	3936
123	Kundara	Quilon	LDF	UDF	CPI(M)	2686
124	Kollam	Quilon	UDF	LDF	INC	4040
125	Eravipuram	Quilon	LDF	UDF	CPI(M)	6045
126	Chathanoor	Quilon	LDF	UDF	CPI(M)	9182
127	Varkala	Chirayinkil	LDF	UDF	CPI(M)	5760
128	Attingal	Chirayinkil	LDF	UDF	CPI(M)	2611
129	Kilimanoor	Chirayinkil	LDF	UDF	CPI(M)	4998
130	Vamanapuram	Chirayinkil	UDF	LDF	INC	2241
131	Ariyanad	Chirayinkil	UDF	LDF	INC	5633
132	Nedumangad	Chirayinkil	UDF	LDF	INC	1990
133	Kazhakuttam	Chirayinkil	UDF	LDF	INC	1114
134	Trivandrum North	Trivandrum	UDF	LDF	INC	1429
135	Trivandrum West	Trivandrum	UDF	LDF	INC	5951
136	Trivandrum East	Trivandrum	UDF	NDA	INC	1616
137	Nemom	Trivandrum	LDF	UDF	CPI	1224
138	Kovalam	Trivandrum	LDF	UDF	CPI	331
139	Neyyattinkara	Trivandrum	UDF	LDF	INC	1593
140	Parassala	Trivandrum	UDF	LDF	INC	4507

== See also ==
- Elections in Kerala
- Politics of Kerala
