= 2004 Indian general election in Kerala =

Democratic election held in India

2004 Indian general election
- 10 May 2004

20 seats
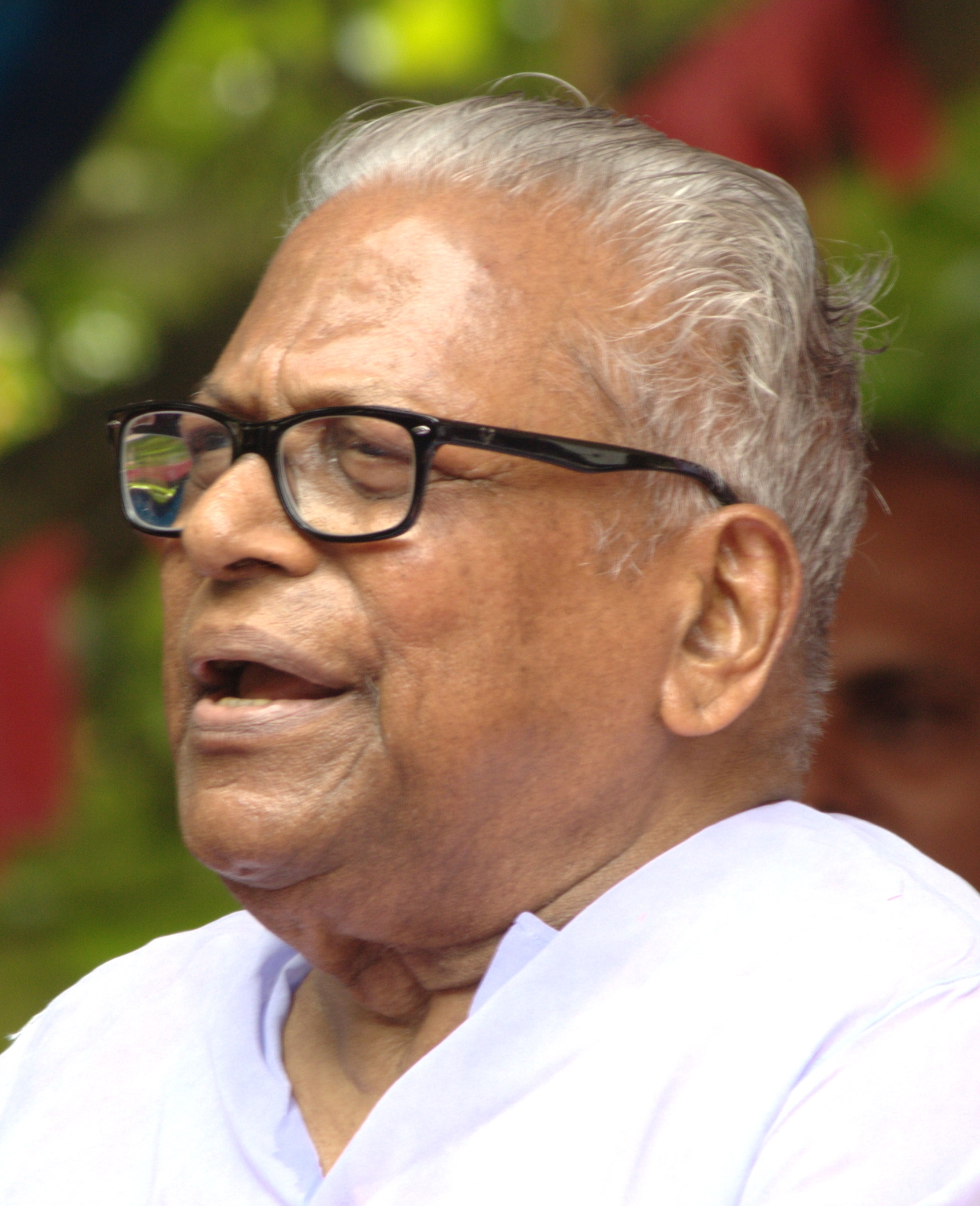

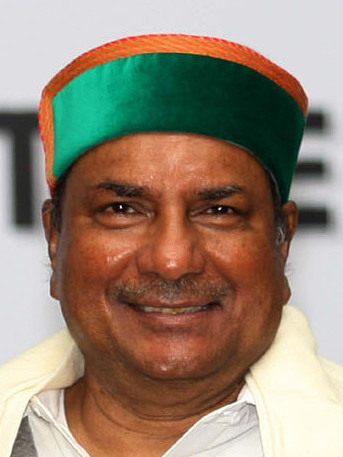

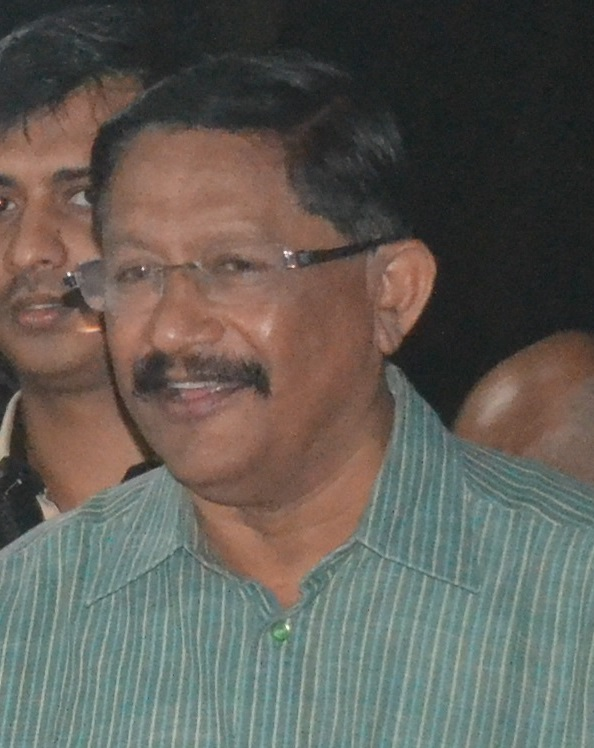
	First party	Second party	Third party
Leader	V.S. Achuthanandan	A. K. Antony	P. C. Thomas
Party	CPI(M)	INC	IFDP
Alliance	LDF	UDF	NDA
Leader's seat	-	-	Muvattupuzha
Last election	9	11	0
Seats won	18	1	1
Seat change	▲9	▼10	▲1
Percentage	46.15%	38.38%	12.08%
Prime Minister before election
Atal Bihari Vajpayee
BJP
Prime Minister after election
Manmohan Singh
INC

The 2004 Indian general election in Kerala were held for 20 Lok Sabha seats in the state. The Communist Party of India (Marxist) led Left Democratic Front (LDF) won 18 seats out of 20 seats in the state. Indian National Congress, who had won 8 seats in the 1999 elections, won one in this election. The other seats were won by Kerala Congress (1), P.C. Thomas's Indian Federal Democratic Party (1), Indian Union Muslim League (1), Janata Dal (Secular) (1), and by an LDF supported Independent candidate (1).

Indian National Congress faced a rout in this election,failing to win even a single seat.In the aftermath of this election, the then Chief Minister of the state A. K. Antony resigned taking sole responsibility for the INC's poor electoral performance. Despite this, the outside support from the Left Front proved valuable for Congress to have a stable government in the Lok Sabha for the next 5 years.

== Schedule ==
Event	Date
Date for Nominations	16 April 2004
Last Date for filing Nominations	23 April 2004
Date for scrutiny of nominations	24 April 2004
Last date for withdrawal of candidatures	26 April 2004
Date of poll	10 May 2004
Date of counting	13 May 2004

== Alliances ==
United Democratic Front (UDF), National Democratic Alliance (NDA), Left Democratic Front (LDF) are the major alliances.

=== United Democratic Front ===
No.	Party	Election Symbol	Seats contested
1.	Indian National Congress		17
2.	Indian Union Muslim League		2
3.	Kerala Congress (M)		1

=== Left Democratic Front ===
No.	Party	Election Symbol	Seats contested
1.	Communist Party of India (Marxist)	Key	13
2.	Communist Party of India	Star	4
3.	Kerala Congress (J)		1
4.	Janata Dal (Secular)		1
5.	Independent		1

=== National Democratic Alliance ===
No.	Party	Election Symbol	Seats contested
1.	Bharatiya Janata Party		19
2.	Indian Federal Democratic Party		1

== List of Candidates ==
Constituency		UPA		Left Front		NDA	
#	Name	Party	Candidate	Party	Candidate	Party	Candidate
1	Kasaragod	INC	N. A. Mohammed	CPM	P. Karunakaran	BJP	V. Balakrishna Shetty
2	Kannur	INC	M. Ramachandran	CPM	A. P. Abdullakutty	BJP	O. K. Vasu Master
3	Badagara	INC	M. T. Padma	CPM	P. Sathidevi	BJP	K. P. Sreesan
4	Calicut	INC	V. Balram	JD(S)	M. P. Veerendra Kumar	BJP	M. T. Ramesh
5	Manjeri	IUML	K. P. A. Majeed	CPM	T. K. Hamza	BJP	Uma Unni
6	Ponnani	IUML	E. Ahamed	CPI	P. P. Suneer	BJP	Aravindan
7	Palghat	INC	V. S. Vijaya Raghavan	CPM	N. N. Krishnadas	BJP	C. Udai Bhasker
8	Ottapalam	INC	K. A. Thulasi	CPM	S. Ajaya Kumar	BJP	P. K. Velayudhan
9	Trichur	INC	A. C. Jose	CPI	C. K. Chandrappan	BJP	P. S. Sreeraman
10	Mukundapuram	INC	Padmaja Venugopal	CPM	Lonappan Nambadan	BJP	Prof. Mathew Pailee
11	Ernakulam	INC	Dr. Edward Edezhath	IND	Sebastian Paul	BJP	O. G. Thankappan
12	Muvattupuzha	KC(M)	Jose K. Mani	CPM	P. M. Ismail	IFDP	P. C. Thomas
13	Kottayam	INC	Anto Antony	CPM	K. Suresh Kurup	BJP	B. Radhakrishna Menon
14	Idukki	INC	Benny Behanan	KC(J)	K. Francis George	BJP	S. T. B. Mohandas
15	Alleppey	INC	V. M. Sudheeran	CPM	K. S. Manoj	BJP	V. Padmanabhan
16	Mavelikara	INC	Ramesh Chennithala	CPM	C. S. Sujatha	BJP	S. Krishnakumar
17	Adoor	INC	Kodikunnil Suresh	CPI	Chengara Surendran	BJP	P. M. Velayudhan
18	Quilon	INC	Sooranad Rajasekharan	CPM	P. Rajendran	BJP	Kizhakkanela Sudhakaran
19	Chirayinkil	INC	M. I. Shanavas	CPM	Varkala Radhakrishnan	BJP	J. R. Padmakumar
20	Trivandrum	INC	V. S. Sivakumar	CPI	P. K. Vasudevan Nair	BJP	O. Rajagopal

== List of elected MPs ==
No.	Constituency	Name of Elected M.P.	Party Affiliation	Alliance
1	Kasaragod	P. Karunakaran	CPI(M)	LDF
2	Kannur	A. P. Abdullakutty	CPI(M)	LDF
3	Vatakara	P. Satheedevi	CPI(M)	LDF
4	Kozhikode	M. P. Veerendra Kumar	JD(S)	LDF
5	Manjeri	T. K. Hamza	CPI(M)	LDF
6	Ponnani	E. Ahammed	IUML	UDF
7	Palakkad	N. N. Krishnadas	CPI(M)	LDF
8	Ottapalam	S. Ajaya Kumar	CPI(M)	LDF
9	Thrissur	C. K. Chandrappan	CPI	LDF
10	Mukundapuram	Lonappan Nambadan	CPI(M)	LDF
11	Ernakulam	Sebastian Paul	LDF Ind.	LDF
12	Muvattupuzha	P. C. Thomas	IFDP	NDA
13	Kottayam	Suresh Kurup	CPI(M)	LDF
14	Idukki	K. Francis George	KC	LDF
15	Alappuzha	K. S. Manoj	CPI(M)	LDF
16	Mavelikkara	C. S. Sujatha	CPI(M)	LDF
17	Adoor	Chengara Surendran	CPI	LDF
18	Kollam	P. Rajendran	CPI(M)	LDF
19	Chirayankil	Varkala Radhakrishnan	CPI(M)	LDF
20	Thiruvananthapuram	P. K. Vasudevan Nair	CPI	LDF
20	Thiruvananthapuram	Pannyan Raveendran (Note: Elected in 2005 through by-election)	CPI	LDF

== Results ==
=== Results by alliance or party ===
Vote Share (By alliance)
1. LDF (46.1%)
2. UDF (38.4%)
3. NDA (12.1%)
4. Others (3.39%)

Alliance/Party		Popular vote			Seats		
Alliance/Party		Votes	%	±pp	Contested	Won	+/−
LDF	CPI(M)	4,754,567	31.52%	▲3.62%	13	12	▲3
LDF	CPI	1,190,526	7.89%	▲0.29%	4	3	▲3
LDF	KC(J)	353,905	2.35%	▼0.05%	1	1	Steady
LDF	JD(S)	340,111	2.25%	▲0.05%	1	1	▲1
LDF	LDF Ind.	323,042	2.14%	New	1	1	▲1
LDF	Total	6,962,151	46.15%	▲2.45%	20	18	▲9
UDF	INC	4,846,637	32.13%	▼7.27%	17	0	▼8
UDF	IUML	733,228	4.86%	▼0.44%	2	1	▼1
UDF	KC(M)	209,880	1.39%	▼0.91%	1	0	▼1
UDF	Total	5,789,745	38.38%	▼8.52%	20	1	▼10
NDA	BJP	1,566,569	10.38%	▲3.78%	19	0	Steady
NDA	IFDP	380,847	1.70%	New	1	1	New
NDA	Total	1,947,416	12.08%	▲4.18%	20	1	▲1
Others		387,116	3.39%				
Total		15,086,428	100%			20	

=== By alliance ===
Coalition/Alliance	Parties contesting in Kerala from the Alliance in 1999	Seats won in 1999 Election	Parties contesting in Kerala from the Alliance in 2004	Seats won in 2004 Election	Swing
Left Democratic Front	Communist Party of India(12); Communist Party of India (Marxist) (4); Janata Dal (Secular) (1); Kerala Congress (J) (1); Independent (2)	9	Communist Party of India (3); Communist Party of India (Marxist) (12); Janata Dal (Secular) (1); Kerala Congress (J) (1); Independent (1)	18	▲9
United Democratic Front	Indian National Congress(17); Indian Union Muslim League (2); Kerala Congress (1)	11	Indian National Congress; Indian Union Muslim League (1); Kerala Congress	1	▼10
National Democratic Alliance	Bharatiya Janata Party; Janata Dal (United)	0	Kerala Congress (1); P.C. Thomas's Indian Federal Democratic Party 1)	1	▲1

- Note:
  1. UPA was not in existence in 1999, instead the number of seats won in 1999 represents the seats won by Indian National Congress
  2. UDF, is a coalition in Kerala, that was formed in 2001, that includes the Indian National Congress, and splinter Congress groups in Kerala.
  3. Left front, was not part of the UPA, in 2004, instead gave outside support.
  4. P. C. Thomas's Indian Federal Democratic Party, later merged with Kerala Congress and the United Democratic Front.

=== By Party ===
Party	Alliance	Seats contested	Seats	Change	Votes	%	±pp
Indian National Congress	UDF	17	1	▼7	4,846,637	32.13	▼7.27
Communist Party of India (Marxist)	Left Democratic Front	13	12	▲8	4,754,567	31.52	▲3.62
Communist Party of India	Left Democratic Front	4	3	▲3	1,190,526	7.89	▲0.29
Bharatiya Janata Party	NDA	19	0	Steady	15,66,569	10.38	▲3.78
Indian Union Muslim League	UDF	2	1	▼1	733,228	4.86	▼0.44
Kerala Congress (J)	Left Democratic Front	1	1	▲1	353,905	2.35	new
Janata Dal (Secular)	Left Democratic Front	1	1	▲1	340,111	2.25	▲0.05
Indian Federal Democratic Party	NDA	1	1	new	256,411	1.7	new
Kerala Congress (Mani)	UDF	1	0	▼1	209,880	1.39	▼0.91
Bahujan Samaj Party	none	14	0	Steady	74,656	0.49	▲0.48
Peoples Democratic Party (India)	none	1	0	new	45,720	0.3	new
Janata Dal (United)	NDA	4	0	Steady	7,806	0.05	▼1.25
Communist Party of India (Marxist–Leninist) Liberation	None	1	0	new	3,270	0.02	new
Social Action Party	none	1	0	new	2,987	0.02	new
All Kerala M.G.R. Dravida Munnetra Party	none	1	0	new	2,158	0.01	new
Independent	Left Democratic Front	1	1	▼3	323042	2.14	
Total		177	20	–	15,086,428	–	

=== By constituency ===
No.	Constituency	UDF candidate	Votes	%	Party	LDF candidate	Votes	%	Party	NDA candidate	Votes	%	Party	Winning alliance	Margin
1	Kasaragod	N. A. Mohammed	3,29,028	36.5	INC	P. Karunakaran	4,37,284	48.5	CPI(M)	V. Balakrishna Shetty	1,10,328	12.2	BJP	Left Democratic Front	1,08,256
2	Kannur	Mullappally Ramachandran	3,51,209	40.8	INC	A. P. Abdullakutty	4,35,058	50.5	CPI(M)	O. K. Vasu	47,213	5.4	BJP	Left Democratic Front	83,849
3	Vatakara	M. T. Padma	2,98,705	36.1	INC	P. Satheedevi	4,29,294	51.8	CPI(M)	K. P. Sreesan	81,901	9.9	BJP	Left Democratic Front	1,30,589
4	Kozhikode	V. Balram	2,74,785	35.2	INC	M.P. Veerendra Kumar	3,40,111	43.5	JD(S)	M. T. Ramesh	97,711	12.5	BJP	Left Democratic Front	65,326
5	Manjeri	K. P. A. Majeed	3,79,177	41.8	IUML	T. K. Hamza	4,26,920	47.1	CPI(M)	Uma Unni	84,149	9.3	BJP	Left Democratic Front	47,743
6	Ponnani	E. Ahamed	3,54,051	48.5	IUML	P. P. Suneer	2,51,293	34.4	CPI	Aravindan	71,609	9.8	BJP	UDF	1,02,758
7	Palakkad	V. S. Vijaya Raghavan	2,76,986	33.7	INC	N. N. Krishnadas	3,75,144	45.7	CPI(M)	C. Udai Bhasker	1,47,792	18	BJP	Left Democratic Front	98,158
8	Ottapalam	K. A. Thulasi	3,25,518	40.3	INC	S. Ajaya Kumar	3,95,928	49	CPI(M)	Velayudhan	68,193	8.5	BJP	Left Democratic Front	70,410
9	Thrissur	A. C. Jose	2,74,999	40	INC	C. K. Chandrappan	3,20,960	46.7	CPI	P. S. Sreeraman	72,042	10.5	BJP	Left Democratic Front	45,961
10	Mukundapuram	Padmaja Venugopal	2,58,078	35.7	INC	Lonappan Nambadan	3,75,175	51.9	CPI(M)	Mathew Pailee	62,338	8.6	BJP	Left Democratic Front	1,17,097
11	Ernakulam	Edward Edezhath	2,52,943	38.4	INC	Sebastian Paul	3,23,042	49	IND-LDF	O. G. Thankappan	60,697	9.2	BJP	Left Democratic Front	70,099
12	Muvattupuzha	Jose K. Mani	2,09,880	28	KEC(M)	P. M. Ismail	2,55,882	34.3	CPI(M)	P. C. Thomas	2,56,411	34.4	IFDP	NDA	529
13	Kottayam	Vijayamma. S	2,98,299	46.3	INC	K.Suresh Kurup	3,41,213	44.3	CPI(M)	B. Radhakrishna Menon	53,034	7.5	BJP	Left Democratic Front	42,914
14	Idukki	Benny Behanan	2,84,521	39	INC	K. Francis George	3,53,905	48.5	KEC	S. T. B. Mohandas	58,290	8	BJP	Left Democratic Front	69,384
15	Alappuzha	V. M. Sudheeran	3,34,485	45.8	INC	K. S. Manoj	3,35,494	46	CPI(M)	V. Padmanabhan	43,891	6	BJP	Left Democratic Front	1,009
16	Mavelikkara	Ramesh Chennithala	2,70,867	42	INC	C. S. Sujatha	2,78,281	43.2	CPI(M)	S. Krishna Kumar	83,013	12.9	NDA	Left Democratic Front	7,414
17	Adoor	Kodikunnil Suresh	2,77,682	40.6	INC	Chengara Surendran	3,32,216	48.5	CPI(M)	P. M. Velayudhan	61,907	9	BJP	Left Democratic Front	54,534
18	Kollam	Sooranad Rajasekharan	2,44,208	34.6	INC	P. Rajendran	3,55,279	50.4	CPI(M)	Kizhakkanela Sudhakaran	62,183	8.8	BJP	Left Democratic Front	1,11,071
19	Chirayinkil	M. I. Shanavas	2,62,870	39.3	INC	Varkala Radhakrishnan	3,13,612	46.8	CPI(M)	J. R. Padmakumar	71,982	10.7	BJP	Left Democratic Front	50,742
20	Trivandrum	V. S. Sivakumar	2,31,454	30.3	INC	P. K. Vasudevan Nair	2,86,057	37.5	CPI	O. Rajagopal	2,28,052	29.9	BJP	Left Democratic Front	54,603

=== 2005 By-election ===
Due to the death of the sitting MP P. K. Vasudevan Nair, Trivandrum constituency went to bypolls. Turnout for the election was 68.15%

No.	Constituency	UDF candidate	Votes	%	Party	LDF candidate	Votes	%	Party	NDA candidate	Votes	%	Party	Winning alliance	Margin
20	Trivandrum	V. S. Sivakumar	3,16,124	41.63%	INC	Pannyan Raveendran	3,90,324	51.41%	CPI	C. K. Padmanabhan	36,690	4.83%	BJP	Left Democratic Front	74,200

== Post-election Union Council of Ministers from Kerala ==
#	Name	Constituency	Designation	Department	From	To	Party
1	A. K. Antony	Rajya Sabha (Kerala)	Cabinet Minister	Minister of Defence	24 October 2006	22 May 2009	INC
2	Vayalar Ravi	Rajya Sabha (Kerala)	Cabinet Minister	Minister of Overseas Indian Affairs; Minister of Parliamentary Affairs	29 January 2006	22 May 2009	INC
3	E. Ahamed	Ponnani (Lok Sabha)	MoS	Ministry of External Affairs	23 May 2004	22 May 2009	IUML

== Assembly segments wise lead of Parties ==
Party		Assembly segments
LDF	CPI(M)	71
LDF	CPI	19
LDF	JD(S)	7
LDF	KC	7
LDF	Independent	7
LDF	Total	111
UDF	INC	15
UDF	IUML	9
UDF	Total	24
NDA	IFDP	3
NDA	BJP	2
NDA	Total	5
Total		140

== Assembly Constituency ==
S.No	Name	Constituency	Winning Alliance	Runner-up Alliance	Leading Party	Margin
1	Manjeshwar	Kasaragod	UDF	LDF	INC	2695
2	Kasaragod	Kasaragod	UDF	LDF	INC	13668
3	Udma	Kasaragod	LDF	UDF	CPI(M)	15992
4	Hosdurg	Kasaragod	LDF	UDF	CPI(M)	18367
5	Trikaripur	Kasaragod	LDF	UDF	CPI(M)	23867
6	Irikkur	Kannur	UDF	LDF	INC	4158
7	Payyannur	Kasaragod	LDF	UDF	CPI(M)	34590
8	Taliparamba	Kasaragod	LDF	UDF	CPI(M)	30616
9	Azhikode	Kannur	LDF	UDF	CPI(M)	19204
10	Kannur	Kannur	UDF	LDF	INC	1542
11	Edakkad	Kannur	LDF	UDF	CPI(M)	16044
12	Thalassery	Vadakara	LDF	UDF	CPI(M)	23815
13	Peringalam	Vadakara	LDF	UDF	CPI(M)	17188
14	Kuthuparamba	Kannur	LDF	UDF	CPI(M)	31580
15	Peravoor	Kannur	LDF	UDF	CPI(M)	13522
16	Mananthavady	Kannur	LDF	UDF	CPI(M)	8449
17	Badagara	Vadakara	LDF	UDF	CPI(M)	24153
18	Nadapuram	Vadakara	LDF	UDF	CPI(M)	14422
19	Meppayur	Vadakara	LDF	UDF	CPI(M)	17105
20	Quilandy	Vadakara	LDF	UDF	CPI(M)	12390
21	Perambra	Vadakara	LDF	UDF	CPI(M)	20433
22	Balusseri	Calicut	LDF	UDF	JD(S)	19934
23	Koduvally	Calicut	LDF	UDF	JD(S)	9510
24	Kozhikode I	Calicut	LDF	UDF	JD(S)	11687
25	Kozhikode II	Calicut	LDF	UDF	JD(S)	11726
26	Beypore	Manjeri	LDF	UDF	CPI(M)	24149
27	Kunnamangalam	Manjeri	LDF	UDF	CPI(M)	13079
28	Thiruvambady	Calicut	LDF	UDF	JD(S)	2252
29	Kalpetta	Calicut	LDF	UDF	JD(S)	4146
30	Sultan'S Battery	Calicut	LDF	UDF	JD(S)	5468
31	Wandoor	Manjeri	LDF	UDF	CPI(M)	6895
32	Nilambur	Manjeri	LDF	UDF	CPI(M)	11012
33	Manjeri	Manjeri	UDF	LDF	IUML	903
34	Malappuram	Manjeri	UDF	LDF	IUML	5352
35	Kondotty	Manjeri	UDF	LDF	IUML	2025
36	Tirurangadi	Ponnani	UDF	LDF	IUML	23476
37	Tanur	Ponnani	UDF	LDF	IUML	26300
38	Tirur	Ponnani	UDF	LDF	IUML	5728
39	Ponnani	Ponnani	LDF	UDF	CPI	5486
40	Kuttippuram	Ponnani	UDF	LDF	IUML	24516
41	Mankada	Ponnani	UDF	LDF	IUML	18171
42	Perinthalmanna	Ponnani	UDF	LDF	IUML	10252
43	Thrithala	Ottapalam	LDF	UDF	CPI(M)	9851
44	Pattambi	Ottapalam	LDF	UDF	CPI(M)	8651
45	Ottapalam	Ottapalam	LDF	UDF	CPI(M)	19425
46	Sreekrishnapuram	Palghat	LDF	UDF	CPI(M)	18832
47	Mannarkkad	Palghat	UDF	LDF	INC	1574
48	Malampuzha	Palghat	LDF	UDF	CPI(M)	25664
49	Palghat	Palghat	LDF	UDF	CPI(M)	10062
50	Chittur	Palghat	LDF	UDF	CPI(M)	1313
51	Kollengode	Palghat	LDF	UDF	CPI(M)	17536
52	Coyalmannam	Ottapalam	LDF	UDF	CPI(M)	15754
53	Alathur	Palghat	LDF	UDF	CPI(M)	25758
54	Chelakara	Ottapalam	LDF	UDF	CPI(M)	2057
55	Wadakkanchery	Ottapalam	LDF	UDF	CPI(M)	5438
56	Kunnamkulam	Ottapalam	LDF	UDF	CPI(M)	8759
57	Cherpu	Trichur	LDF	UDF	CPI	11063
58	Trichur	Trichur	UDF	LDF	INC	1379
59	Ollur	Trichur	LDF	UDF	CPI	3501
60	Kodakara	Trichur	LDF	UDF	CPI	9619
61	Chalakudi	Mukundapuram	LDF	UDF	CPI(M)	11665
62	Mala	Mukundapuram	LDF	UDF	CPI(M)	12542
63	Irinjalakuda	Mukundapuram	LDF	UDF	CPI(M)	16959
64	Manalur	Trichur	LDF	UDF	CPI	7703
65	Guruvayoor	Trichur	LDF	UDF	CPI	6423
66	Nattika	Trichur	LDF	UDF	CPI	8499
67	Kodungallur	Mukundapuram	LDF	UDF	CPI(M)	24434
68	Ankamali	Mukundapuram	LDF	UDF	CPI(M)	14071
69	Vadakkekara	Mukundapuram	LDF	UDF	CPI(M)	18770
70	Parur	Ernakulam	LDF	UDF	IND	11035
71	Narakkal	Ernakulam	LDF	UDF	IND	8420
72	Ernakulam	Ernakulam	LDF	UDF	IND	4629
73	Mattancherry	Ernakulam	LDF	UDF	IND	3681
74	Palluruthy	Ernakulam	LDF	UDF	IND	4024
75	Trippunithura	Ernakulam	LDF	UDF	IND	18834
76	Alwaye	Ernakulam	LDF	UDF	IND	18888
77	Perumbavoor	Mukundapuram	LDF	UDF	CPI(M)	17600
78	Kunnathunad	Muvattupuzha	LDF	UDF	CPI(M)	11373
79	Piravom	Muvattupuzha	LDF	NDA	CPI(M)	9189
80	Muvattupuzha	Muvattupuzha	LDF	NDA	CPI(M)	7022
81	Kothamangalam	Muvattupuzha	LDF	NDA	CPI(M)	6322
82	Thodupuzha	Idukki	LDF	UDF	KEC	17629
83	Devicolam	Idukki	LDF	UDF	KEC	11317
84	Idukki	Idukki	LDF	UDF	KEC	13060
85	Udumbanchola	Idukki	LDF	UDF	KEC	16471
86	Peermade	Idukki	LDF	UDF	KEC	33
87	Kanjirappally	Muvattupuzha	NDA	LDF	IFDP	7782
88	Vazhoor	Kottayam	LDF	UDF	CPI(M)	6189
89	Changanacherry	Kottayam	LDF	UDF	CPI(M)	119
90	Kottayam	Kottayam	LDF	UDF	CPI(M)	12820
91	Ettumanoor	Kottayam	LDF	UDF	CPI(M)	3754
92	Puthuppally	Kottayam	LDF	UDF	CPI(M)	4995
93	Poonjar	Muvattupuzha	NDA	LDF	IFDP	9755
94	Palai	Muvattupuzha	NDA	UDF	IFDP	10848
95	Kaduthuruthy	Kottayam	UDF	LDF	INC	2105
96	Vaikom	Kottayam	LDF	UDF	CPI(M)	16380
97	Aroor	Alleppey	UDF	LDF	INC	7615
98	Sherthalai	Alleppey	LDF	UDF	CPI(M)	1822
99	Mararikulam	Alleppey	LDF	UDF	CPI(M)	7423
100	Alleppey	Alleppey	UDF	LDF	INC	1489
101	Ambalapuzha	Alleppey	LDF	UDF	CPI(M)	2835
102	Kuttanad	Alleppey	UDF	LDF	INC	1003
103	Haripad	Alleppey	UDF	LDF	INC	1243
104	Kayamkulam	Mavelikara	LDF	UDF	CPI(M)	6657
105	Thiruvalla	Mavelikara	UDF	LDF	INC	8345
106	Kallooppara	Mavelikara	UDF	LDF	INC	3540
107	Aranmula	Mavelikara	UDF	LDF	INC	158
108	Chengannur	Mavelikara	UDF	LDF	INC	1546
109	Mavelikara	Mavelikara	LDF	UDF	CPI(M)	7814
110	Pandalam	Mavelikara	LDF	UDF	CPI(M)	6153
111	Ranni	Idukki	LDF	UDF	KEC	7800
112	Pathanamthitta	Idukki	LDF	UDF	KEC	2550
113	Konni	Adoor	LDF	UDF	CPI	13031
114	Pathanapuram	Adoor	LDF	UDF	CPI	3014
115	Punalur	Adoor	LDF	UDF	CPI	4471
116	Chadayamangalam	Adoor	LDF	UDF	CPI	11580
117	Kottarakkara	Adoor	LDF	UDF	CPI	284
118	Neduvathur	Adoor	LDF	UDF	CPI	16470
119	Adoor	Adoor	LDF	UDF	CPI	5369
120	Kunnathur	Quilon	LDF	UDF	CPI(M)	13164
121	Karunagappally	Quilon	LDF	UDF	CPI(M)	11586
122	Chavara	Quilon	LDF	UDF	CPI(M)	9239
123	Kundara	Quilon	LDF	UDF	CPI(M)	15323
124	Kollam	Quilon	LDF	UDF	CPI(M)	10097
125	Eravipuram	Quilon	LDF	UDF	CPI(M)	29058
126	Chathanoor	Quilon	LDF	UDF	CPI(M)	21318
127	Varkala	Chirayinkil	LDF	UDF	CPI(M)	9269
128	Attingal	Chirayinkil	LDF	UDF	CPI(M)	10726
129	Kilimanoor	Chirayinkil	LDF	UDF	CPI(M)	11966
130	Vamanapuram	Chirayinkil	LDF	UDF	CPI(M)	1982
131	Ariyanad	Chirayinkil	LDF	UDF	CPI(M)	2720
132	Nedumangad	Chirayinkil	LDF	UDF	CPI(M)	8514
133	Kazhakuttam	Chirayinkil	LDF	UDF	CPI(M)	4976
134	Trivandrum North	Trivandrum	NDA	LDF	BJP	1924
135	Trivandrum West	Trivandrum	LDF	NDA	CPI	4271
136	Trivandrum East	Trivandrum	NDA	LDF	BJP	7893
137	Nemom	Trivandrum	LDF	NDA	CPI	6523
138	Kovalam	Trivandrum	LDF	UDF	CPI	5400
139	Neyyattinkara	Trivandrum	LDF	UDF	CPI	8997
140	Parassala	Trivandrum	LDF	UDF	CPI	2845

Result- Party Wise

LDF	111	UDF	24	NDA	5

Alliance	assembly segments.
LDF	111
UDF	24
NDA	5
Total assembly lead out of 140.

Alliance	assembly segments
LDF	28
UDF	107
NDA	5
Second position in the assembly segments (out of 140).

	2004 Lok Sabha	2006 Assembly Election
CPI(M)	71	61
CPI	19	17
KEC	7	4
JD(S)	7	5
INC	15	24
IUML	9	7
BJP	2	0
IFDP	3	-
