= 1998 Indian general election in Kerala =

1998 Indian general election
- February–March 1998

20 seats
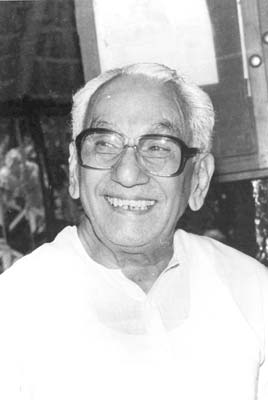

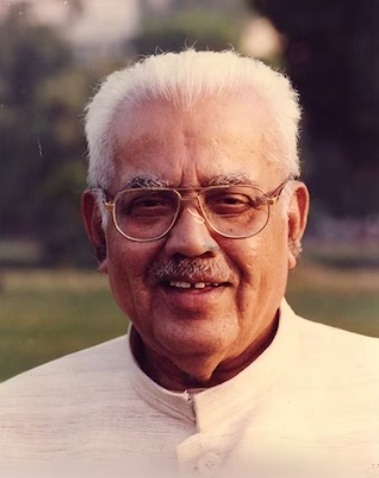
	First party	Second party
Leader	K. Karunakaran	E.K. Nayanar
Party	INC	CPI(M)
Alliance	UDF	LDF
Leader's seat	Thiruvananthapuram	-
Last election	10	10
Seats won	11	9
Seat change	▲1	▼1
Percentage	46.08%	44.55%
Prime Minister before election
Inder Kumar Gujral
JD
Prime Minister after election
Atal Bihari Vajpayee
BJP

The 1998 Indian general election were held to elect 20 members to the twelfth Lok Sabha from Kerala. Indian National Congress (INC)-led United Democratic Front (UDF) won 11 seats, while the Left Democratic Front (LDF), led by Communist Party of India (Marxist) (CPI(M)) won the remaining 9 seats. The earlier election in 1996 saw both alliances win equal share of seats. Turnout for the election was at 70.66%

== Background ==
The ruling LDF government in the state faced infightings, especially among V. S. Achuthanandan and CITU as the former was denied the Chief Ministerial post. KSKTU launched agitations against paddy field reclamation, which spiraled into a law and order issue. The state High Court directed the government to return the crop fields to the farmers. M. L. Ahuja cited "an element of militancy" and "disregard for democratic forms of agitations" among the CPI(M) activists during the agitation.

== Alliances and parties ==
UDF is a Kerala legislative alliance formed by INC veteran K. Karunakaran. LDF comprises primarily of CPI(M) and the CPI, forming the Left Front in the national level. Bharatiya Janata Party (BJP), leading National Democratic Alliance (NDA) at national level contested in all 20 seats.

=== United Democratic Front ===
No.	Party	Election Symbol	Seats Contested
1.	Indian National Congress		17
2.	Indian Union Muslim League		2
3.	Kerala Congress (M)		1

=== Left Democratic Front ===
No.	Party	Election Symbol	Seats Contested
1.	Communist Party of India (Marxist)	Key	9
2.	Communist Party of India	Star	4
3.	Revolutionary Socialist Party		1
4.	Independents		3
5.	Janata Dal		2
6.	Kerala Congress		1

=== National Democratic Alliance ===
No.	Party	Election Symbol	Seats Contested
1.	Bharatiya Janata Party		20

== List of Candidates ==
Constituency		UDF		LDF		BJP	
#	Name	Party	Candidate	Party	Candidate	Party	Candidate
1	Kasaragod	INC	Khader Mangad	CPM	T. Govindan	BJP	P. K. Krishna
2	Cannanore	INC	M. Ramachandran	IND	A. C. Shanmughadas	BJP	P. C. Mohanan
3	Badagara	INC	P. M. Suresh Babu	CPM	A. K. Premajam	BJP	C. Balakrishnan Master
4	Calicut	INC	P. Sankaran	JD	M. P. Veerendra Kumar	BJP	P. S. Sreedharan Pillai
5	Manjeri	IUML	E. Ahamed	CPM	K. V. Salahuddin	BJP	Sumathy Haridas
6	Ponnani	IUML	G. M. Banatwala	CPI	Minu Mumthas	BJP	Ahalliya Sankar
7	Palghat	INC	V. S. Vijayaraghavan	CPM	N. N. Krishnadas	BJP	T. C. Govindan
8	Ottapalam (SC)	INC	K. K. Vijayalakshmi	CPM	S. Ajaya Kumar	BJP	P. M. Velayudhan
9	Trichur	INC	K. Muraleedharan	CPI	V. V. Raghavan	BJP	P. M. Gopinadhan
10	Mukundapuram	INC	A. C. Jose	CPM	P. Govinda Pillai	BJP	P. D. Purushothaman
11	Ernakulam	INC	George Eden	IND	Sebastian Paul	BJP	V. V. Augustine
12	Muvattupuzha	KC(M)	P. C. Thomas	JD	Mathew John	BJP	Narayanan Namboothiri
13	Kottayam	INC	Ramesh Chennithala	CPM	K. Suresh Kurup	BJP	George Kurian
14	Idukki	INC	P. C. Chacko	KEC	K. Francis George	BJP	D. Asokakumar
15	Alleppey	INC	V. M. Sudheeran	CPM	C. S. Sujatha	BJP	T. L. Radhamma
16	Mavelikara	INC	P. J. Kurien	IND	Ninan Koshy	BJP	Rajan Moolaveettil
17	Adoor (SC)	INC	Kodikunnil Suresh	CPI	Chengara Surendran	BJP	Kainakary Janardhanan
18	Quilon	INC	K. C. Rajan	RSP	N. K. Premachandran	BJP	Raichel Matthai
19	Chirayinkil	INC	M. M. Hassan	CPM	Varkala Radhakrishnan	BJP	T. M. Viswambharan
20	Trivandrum	INC	K. Karunakaran	CPI	K. V. Surendranath	BJP	Kerala Varma Raja

== List of elected MPs ==
No.	Constituency	Name of Elected M.P.	Party affiliation
1	Kasaragod	T. Govindan	CPI(M)
2	Kannur	Mullappally Ramachandran	INC
3	Vatakara	A. K. Premajam	CPI(M)
4	Kozhikode	P. Sankaran	INC
5	Manjeri	E. Ahamed	IUML
6	Ponnani	G. M. Banatwala	IUML
7	Palakkad	N. N. Krishnadas	CPI(M)
8	Ottapalam	S. Ajaya Kumar	CPI(M)
9	Thrissur	V. V. Raghavan	CPI
10	Mukundapuram	A. C. Jose	INC
11	Ernakulam	George Eden	INC
12	Muvattupuzha	P. C. Thomas	KC(M)
13	Kottayam	K. Suresh Kurup	CPI(M)
14	Idukki	P. C. Chacko	KEC
15	Alappuzha	V. M. Sudheeran	INC
16	Mavelikkara	P. J. Kurien	INC
17	Adoor	Chengara Surendran	CPI
18	Kollam	N. K. Premachandran	RSP
19	Chirayankil	Varkala Radhakrishnan	CPI(M)
20	Thiruvananthapuram	K. Karunakaran	INC

== Results ==
=== Performance of political parties ===
Vote Share by alliance
1. UDF (46.1%)
2. LDF (44.5%)
3. NDA (8.02%)
4. Other (1.35%)

No.	Party	Political Front	Seats	Votes	%Votes	±pp
1	Indian National Congress	UDF	8	57,46,566	38.67%	▲0.66
2	Communist Party of India (Marxist)	LDF	4	31,21,636	21%	▼0.16
3	Communist Party of India	LDF	2	12,35,761	8.32%	▲0.10
4	Bharatiya Janata Party	NDA	0	11,92,046	8.02%	▲2.41
5	Indian Union Muslim League	UDF	2	7,45,070	5.01%	▼0.07
6	Janata Dal	LDF	0	5,80,094	3.90%	▼0.50
7	Revolutionary Socialist Party	LDF	1	3,96,145	2.67%	▲0.17
8	Kerala Congress (M)	UDF	1	3,56,168	2.40%	▼0.26
9	Kerala Congress	LDF	0	3,27,649	2.20%	▼0.03
10	Indian National League	none	0	80,333	0.54%	▲0.53
11	Peoples Democratic Party	none	0	40,972	0.28%	▼0.17
12	Bahujan Samaj Party	none	0	19,475	0.1%	▼0.05
13	Shiv Sena	none	0	3,290	0.02%	Steady
14	Janata Party	none	0	1,164	0.01%	Steady
15	Nagaland Peoples Party	none	0	1,066	0.01%	Steady
16	The Humanist Party Of India	none	0	765	0.01%	new
17	Samata Party	none	0	558	0.00%	▼0.01
Independents			2	10,13,067	6.82%	▼0.15

=== By constituency ===
No.	Constituency	UDF candidate	Votes	%	Party	LDF candidate	Votes	%	Party	NDA candidate	Votes	%	Party	Winning alliance	Margin
1	Kasaragod	Khader Mangad	3,47,670	39.9%	INC	T. Govindan	3,95,910	45.4%	CPI(M)	P. K. Krishnadas	1,03,093	11.8%	BJP	LDF	48,240
2	Kannur	Mullappally Ramachandran	3,80,465	46.2%	INC	A .C. Shanmukhadas	3,78,285	45.9%	IND	P. C. Mohanan	42,760	5.2%	BJP	UDF	2,180
3	Vatakara	P. M. Suresh Babu	3,48,715	41.3%	INC	A. K. Premajam	4,07,876	48.3%	CPI(M)	Chettoor Balakrishnan	69,564	8.2%	BJP	LDF	59,161
4	Kozhikode	P. Sankaran	3,56,392	45.0%	INC	M. P. Veerendra Kumar	3,37,735	42.6%	JD	P. C. Mohanan	83,862	10.1%	BJP	UDF	18,657
5	Manjeri	E. Ahamed	4,00,609	49.3%	IUML	K. V. Salahuddin	2,94,600	36.2%	CPI(M)	Sumathy Haridas	79,546	9.8%	BJP	UDF	1,06,009
6	Ponnani	G. M. Banatwalla	3,44,461	49.7%	IUML	Minu Mumthas	2,40,217	34.7%	CPI	Ahalliya Sankar	65,008	9.4%	BJP	UDF	1,04,244
7	Palakkad	V. S. Vijayaraghavan	3,20,941	43.1%	INC	N. N. Krishnadas	3,45,963	46.4%	CPI(M)	T. C. Govindan	61,419	8.2%	BJP	LDF	25,022
8	Ottapalam	K. K. Vijayalakshmi	3,15,576	43.7%	INC	S. Ajayakumar	3,35,376	46.5%	CPI(M)	P. M. Velayudhan	63,185	8.8%	BJP	LDF	19,800
9	Thrissur	K. Muraleedharan	3,47,945	46.2%	INC	V. V. Raghavan	3,38,996	45.1%	CPI	P. D. Purushothaman	54,479	7.2%	BJP	LDF	18,409
10	Mukundapuram	A. C. Jose	3,97,156	50.1%	INC	P. Govinda Pillai	3,44,693	43.5%	CPI(M)	M. S. Muraleedharan	30,779	3.9%	BJP	UDF	8,949
11	Ernakulam	George Eden	3,89,387	50.2%	INC	Sebastian Paul	3,14,879	40.6%	IND	V. V. Augustine	62,262	8.0%	BJP	UDF	74,508
12	Muvattupuzha	P. C. Thomas	3,56,168	53.9%	KC(M)	Mathew John	2,42,359	36.7%	JD	Narayanan Namboothiri	50,738	7.7%	BJP	UDF	1,13,809
13	Kottayam	Ramesh Chennithala	3,30,447	45.9%	INC	K. Suresh Kurup	3,35,893	46.7%	CPI(M)	George Kurian	42,830	5.9%	BJP	LDF	5,446
14	Idukki	P. C. Chacko	3,33,999	46.4%	INC	K. Francis George	3,27,649	45.6%	KEC	D. Asokakumar	46,130	6.4%	BJP	UDF	6,350
15	Alappuzha	V. M. Sudheeran	3,86,180	50.5%	INC	C. S. Sujatha	3,45,543	45.2%	CPI(M)	T. L. Radhamma	27,010	3.5%	BJP	UDF	40,637
16	Mavelikkara	P. J. Kurien	2,75,001	44.0%	INC	Ninan Koshy	2,73,740	43.8%	IND	Rajan Moolaveettil	68,450	11.0%	BJP	UDF	1,261
17	Adoor	Kodikunnil Suresh	3,16,292	45.8%	INC	Chengara Surendran	3,33,297	48.2%	CPI	Kainakary Janardhanan	34,816	5.0%	BJP	LDF	17,005
18	Kollam	K. C. Rajan	3,24,383	42.4%	INC	N. K. Premachandran	3,96,145	51.8%	RSP	Raichel Matthai	36,916	4.8%	BJP	LDF	71,762
19	Chirayinkil	M. M. Hassan	3,13,937	45.1%	INC	Varkala Radhakrishnan	3,21,479	46.2%	CPI(M)	T. M. Viswambharan	47,249	6.8%	BJP	LDF	7,542
20	Trivandrum	K. Karunakaran	3,37,429	44.0%	INC	K. V. Surendranath	3,22,031	42.0%	CPI	Kerala Varma Raja	94,303	12.3%	BJP	UDF	15,398

== See also ==
- Elections in Kerala
- Politics of Kerala
