= Iyyunni Chalakka =

Indian politician (1890-1961)

C. R. Iyyunni

Member of the Indian Parliament for Thrichur
- In office 1952–1957
- Preceded by: Position Created
- Succeeded by: K. Krishnan Warrier

Personal details
- Born: 15 October 1890 Thrissur, India
- Died: 21 January 1961
- Party: Indian National Congress
- Spouse: Annie (Kunjannam) Iyyunni
- Education: Maharajas College, Ernakulam

C. R. Iyyunni (15 October 1890 - 21 January 1961) was an Indian National Congress politician from Thrissur, Kerala. He was a member of Parliament for Travancore-Cochin from 1952 to 1957.

== Early life and education ==
Shri Iyyunni Chalakka was born on 15 October 1890. His father was Shri Rappayi. He was educated at C.M.S. High School, Trichur, Maharaja's College, Ernakulam, Madras Christian College and Government Law College, Thiruvananthapuram.

== Political career ==
He served as an advocate in Thrissur along with Congress activities in the locality. He was also renowned for his role in the promotion of banking institutions such as Catholic Syrian Bank Limited, Malabar Bank, Cochin Reserve Bank, Indian Insurance and Banking Corporation. He held other offices such as Chairman of Trichur Municipality, President of Trichur Bar Association, President of Civil Liberties Union, Chairman of Managing Committee, Indo-Mercantile Bank, Minister of Revenue in Cochin State, Member of K.P.C.C., Member of Cochin D.C.C. and Parliamentary Board and Public Relations committee Travancore-Cochin State.

== Death ==
Iyyunni died on 21 January 1961.
