= T. K. Ramakrishnan =

Indian politician

Minister For Fisheries and Rural development Government of Kerala
- In office 20 May 1996 - 13 May 2001
- Preceded by: M. T. Padma (Minister For Fisheries), Kadavoor Sivadasan (Minister For Rural development)
- Succeeded by: K. V. Thomas (Minister For Fisheries); C. F. Thomas (Minister For Rural development)

Minister For Co-operation and Fisheries Government of Kerala
- In office 26 March 1987 - 17 June 1991
- Preceded by: M. L. Jacob (Minister For Fisheries), M. Kamalam (Minister For Co-operation)
- Succeeded by: M. T. Padma (Minister For Fisheries), M. V. Raghavan (Minister For Co-operation)

Minister For Home Affairs Government of Kerala
- In office 25 January 1980 - 20 October 1981
- Preceded by: C. H. Muhammad Koya (Minister For Home Affairs)
- Succeeded by: Ummen Chandy (Minister For Home Affairs)

Leader of Opposition in Kerala Legislative Assembly
- In office 13 August 1978 - 11 October 1979
- Preceded by: K. Karunakaran
- Succeeded by: P. K. Vasudevan Nair

2nd Convenor Of Left Democratic Front (LDF) Of Kerala
- In office 1986-1987
- Preceded by: P. V. Kunjikannan
- Succeeded by: M. M. Lawrence

Member of Kerala Legislative Assembly
- In office 1987-2001
- Preceded by: N. Srinivasan
- Succeeded by: Mercy Ravi
- Constituency: Kottayam
- In office 1977-1982
- Preceded by: Paul P. Mani
- Succeeded by: K. G. R. Kartha
- Constituency: Thrippunithura
- In office 1967-1970
- Preceded by: Constituency Established
- Succeeded by: Paul P. Mani
- Constituency: Thrippunithura
- In office 1957-1964
- Preceded by: Constituency Established
- Succeeded by: Constituency Abolished
- Constituency: Kanayannur

Personal details
- Born: 1922
- Died: 21 April 2006 (aged 83–84)

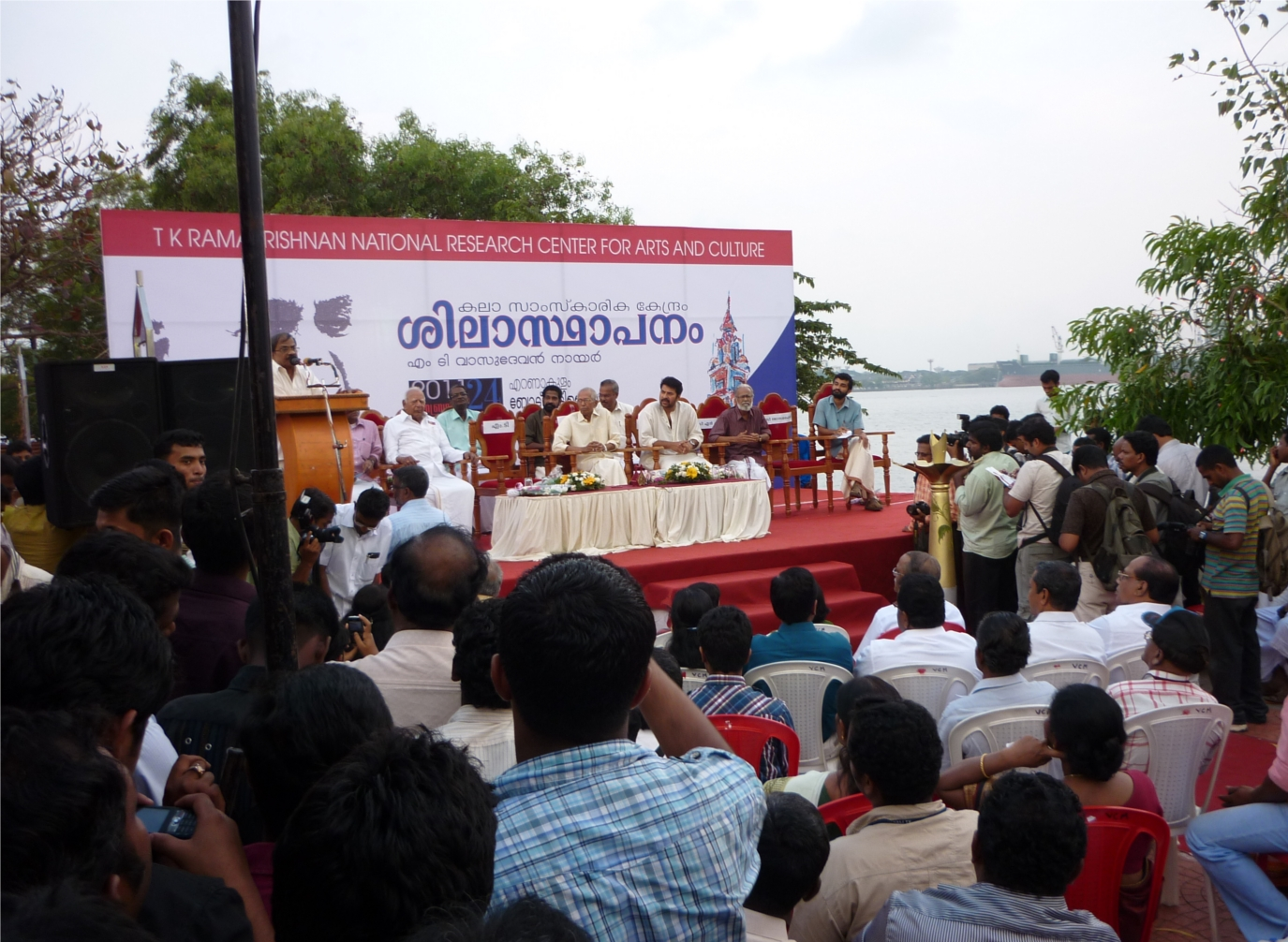
T. K. Ramakrishnan Research center inaugural ceremony

T. K. Ramakrishnan (1922 – 21 April 2006) was a politician from Tripunithura, Kerala, India. Ramakrishnan won the assembly elections seven times and was the opposition leader in the fifth Kerala Legislative Assembly in 1979. He was in charge of the Home, Excise, Cultural Affairs and Fisheries Departments during the Left Democratic Front administration at different times. He was a Central Committee member of Communist Party of India (Marxist). T. K. Ramakrishnan died 21 April 2006.

T.K started his public life in the student movement and later became a trade union activist. He functioned as the State President and Secretary of the Kerala Karshaka Sanghom. Com. T. K was a multi- faceted. He has five children and 10 grandchildren. He had left his mark in the cultural front also. He had also excelled in his role as M.L.A and as a Cabinet Minister in charge of various portfolios like Home, Fisheries, Co-Operation, Culture etc.

He was a lover of books and arts. He wrote a series of plays, which highlighted the social realities of the time, and which propagated the Communist ideology. He also wrote a novel Kallile Theepporikal (Sparks from the rock).

He is credited with the creation of various cultural institutions that enriched the society of Kerala such as Council of Historic Research and the Institute of Heritage.
