= P. M. Ismail =

Indian politician

Adv P. M. Ismail

Personal details
- Born: Muvattupuzha, Kerala
- Party: Communist Party of India (Marxist)
- Spouse: Pathumma Beevi
- Children: 2 sons and 1 daughter

Adv. P.M.Ismail is an Indian politician who won the Muvattupuzha seat in the 2004 General Election after his opponent P. C. Thomas was disqualified by the Supreme Court.

== Muvattupuzha ==
General Election, 2004: Muvattupuzha
Party	Candidate	Votes	%	±%
Indian Federal Democratic Party	P.C. Thomas	256,411	34.4	n/a
CPI(M)	Adv. P.M. Ismail	255,882	34.3	n/a
KC(M)	Jose K. Mani	209,880	28.1	n/a
Indian Federal Democratic Party gain from KC(M)		Swing		
Indian Federal Democratic Party gain from UDF		Swing		
