= George Thomas Kottukapally =

Indian politician (1901–1970)

Member of Parliament for Meenachil
- In office 1953–1957
- Preceded by: P. T. Chacko
- Succeeded by: Constituency abolished

Member of Parliament for Muvattupuzha
- In office 1957–1962
- Preceded by: New constituency
- Succeeded by: Cherian J. Kappan

Personal details
- Born: 29 October 1901 Pala, Kottayam
- Died: 11 October 1970
- Cause of death: Heart attack
- Party: Indian National Congress
- Spouse: Chechamma Thomas
- Children: 9 sons and 4 daughters
- Parents: George Menamparambil (father); Kunjely Kottukapally (mother)
- Education: Collin's Institute, Calcutta
- Occupation: Member of Parliament, Public intellectual, Planter, Philanthropist, Social Activist, former United Nations representative

George Thomas Kottukapally (29 October 1901 – 11 October 1970) was a Member of Parliament,[1] philanthropist, one of South India's largest plantation owners, public intellectual, an Indian independence activist and a member of the Indian National Congress from Pala in Kottayam district, Kerala. He was associated with the Indian National Congress and participated in the Non-Cooperation Movement. Following India’s independence, he served as Municipal Chairman of Pala from 1948 to 1953. He was later elected as a Member of Parliament to the 1st and 2nd Lok Sabha from the Muvattupuzha constituency, serving from 1953 to 1962. In 1958, he was a member of India’s delegation to the United Nations under Prime Minister Jawaharlal Nehru.

== Early life and family ==
George Thomas Kottukapally was the son of George Menamparambil and Kunjely Kottukapally, in Pala, Kottayam. Members of the Kottukapally family were active in regional public life. Thomas's elder brother, George Joseph Kottukapally, participated in the Indian independence movement and served in the Sree Moolam Popular Assembly of the erstwhile Kingdom of Travancore.

Kottukapally family traces its origins to a tradition that links its ancestry to a Brahmin family known as “Kottakkavu,” said to have converted to Christianity in 52 CE through the missionary activity of Thomas the Apostle. The family is associated with the Kottakkavu Mar Thoma Syro-Malabar Pilgrim Church in North Paravur, which is traditionally regarded as one of the seven churches founded by the apostle.

The family’s association with Pala in Kottayam dates to the 18th century, when they are said to have migrated there to engage in pepper trade under the patronage of a local chieftain of Meenachil. The family is credited in local accounts with contributing to the development of the trading centre known as “Angadi” Pala. The ancestral residence, referred to as the Kottukapally Tharavad, remains in Pala and is associated with later generations of the family.

Thomas married Chechamma and had 9 sons and 4 daughters, their eldest son, Joseph Thomas Kottukapally, served as Municipal Chairman of Pala for an extended period.

== Social Contributions ==
George Thomas Kottukapally belonged to a Syro-Malabar Saint Thomas Christian family from Pala in Kottayam district, which influenced his involvement in religious and social initiatives. He was a supporter and benefactor of the Syro-Malabar Catholic Church in the region. His contributions included financial support and the provision of land for the establishment of the Bishop’s House in Pala, which preceded the formation of the Syro-Malabar Eparchy of Pala.

In addition, he contributed land and funding for the establishment of several educational institutions in Pala, including St. Thomas College, Pala (founded in 1950), Alphonsa College, Pala (founded in 1964), and St. Thomas Teacher's Training College, Pala (founded in 1957).

According to K. P. S. Menon, India’s first Foreign Secretary under Jawaharlal Nehru, Kottukapally played a significant role in the development of Pala in Kottayam district following Indian independence. In a public foreword discussing Kottukapally’s contributions, Menon described him as a “key architect” and one of the “founding fathers” of the township during his tenure as Municipal Chairman from 1948 to 1953. He also credited Kottukapally with contributions to the agricultural, industrial, and banking sectors, and noted his advocacy and efforts in facilitating the realization of the Idukki Hydroelectric Project.

Kottukapally's contributions were noted by former President of India, A. P. J. Abdul Kalam, during a speech at the 62nd foundation day celebrations of St. Thomas College, Pala in 2012, which also marked Kottukapally’s 111th birth anniversary. Kalam referred to Kottukapally’s role as a financial sponsor and co-founder of the college, including his contribution of land for its establishment in the 1950s.

== Banking ==
George Thomas Kottukapally served as President of the Travancore–Cochin Bankers Association, a regional industry body, and was one of the key promoters and directors of Palai Central Bank, established in 1927. At its peak in 1960, the bank was reported to be the 17th largest among India’s scheduled banks and one of the largest private enterprises in Kerala.

In 1960, the Kerala High Court ordered the liquidation of the bank following a petition by the Reserve Bank of India. The history of the bank is discussed in detail in Volume II of the official history of the Reserve Bank of India (covering 1951–1967), which includes a dedicated appendix on the subject. According to this account, Jawaharlal Nehru, while defending the Reserve Bank as an efficient institution, was reported to have acknowledged that the closure of the Palai Central Bank may have been a “mistake.”

== Planter and Agriculturist ==
George Thomas Kottukapally was one of South India's leading an agricultural plantation owner, investor, and industrialist in South India, and served as a managing director and director in several plantation, banking, and related enterprises, including Teekoy Rubbers (India) Ltd, Karikode Rubbers (1945) Ltd, and Periyar & Pareekanni Rubber Limited.

Historically, the Kottukapally family is recorded as one of the largest land-holding families in the State of Kerala while currently, George Thomas Kottukapally, though deceased, still continues to be ranked historically as one of the largest Christian landowners in the Indian subcontinent. Following his death, portions of his estates were acquired by the Government of Kerala under land reform measures, including lands in Cheemeni in Kasaragod district.
