= P. T. Chacko =

Indian politician (1915–1964)

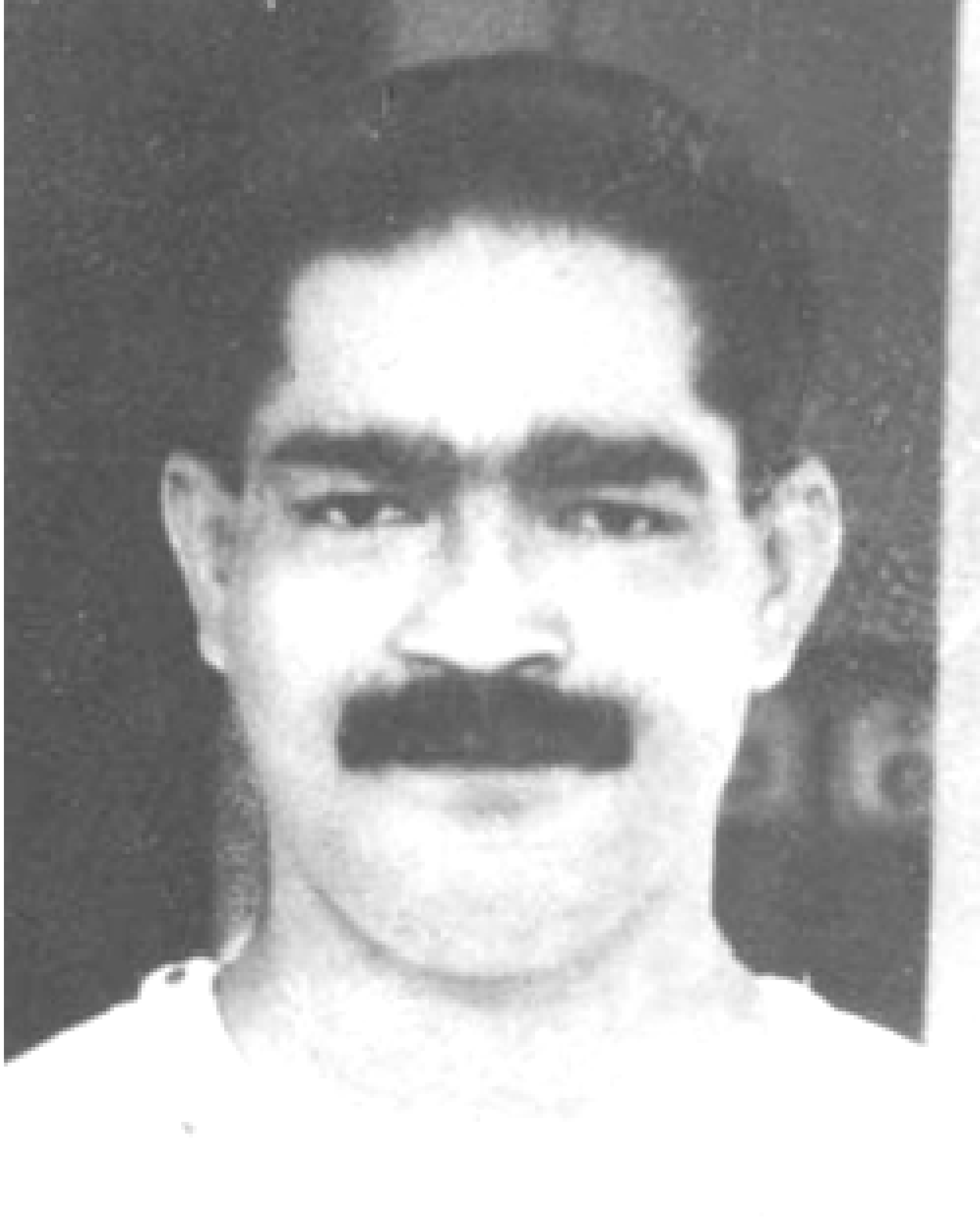
- P. T. Chacko

Minister for Home Affairs, Revenue and Law Government of Kerala
- In office 1960 – 1964
- Chief Minister: Pattom Thanu Pillai; R. Shankar

Member of Parliament Meenachil
- In office 1952 – 1953
- Preceded by: Position established
- Succeeded by: George Thomas Kottukapally

Personal details
- Born: 9 April 1915 Chamampathal, Travancore, British India (present day Kottayam)
- Died: 1 August 1964 (aged 49)
- Party: Indian National Congress
- Spouse: Mariamma
- Children: 6 (including P. C. Thomas)

Pulloli Thomas Chacko (9 April 1915 – 1 August 1964) was an Indian politician from Chamampathal, Kottayam in central Kerala. A member of the Travancore and Travancore-Cochin Assemblies and the Constituent Assembly, Chacko served as the first Leader of Opposition of the newly formed state of Kerala (Namboodiripad ministry). He was also the Home Minister of Kerala holding the additional portfolios of Revenue and Law during the period 1960–64 (Pillai and Sankar ministries). Resignation of Chacko from the Congress-led cabinet in 1964 resulted in the formation of the regional party Kerala Congress.

== Early life ==
P. T. Chacko was born on 9 April 1915 to Thomas and Annamma of the Pulloli family at Chamampathal in the erstwhile Kingdom of Travancore. He was married to Mariamma and was survived by their six children.

Chacko graduated from St. Joseph's College, Trichy, the University of Madras after studying in St. Berchmans College Changanassery. He continued his studies in law at Government Law College, Thiruvananthapuram, where as a student leader in 1938, he participated in the anti-colonial struggle and in the agitation against the princely state of Travancore.

== Political career ==
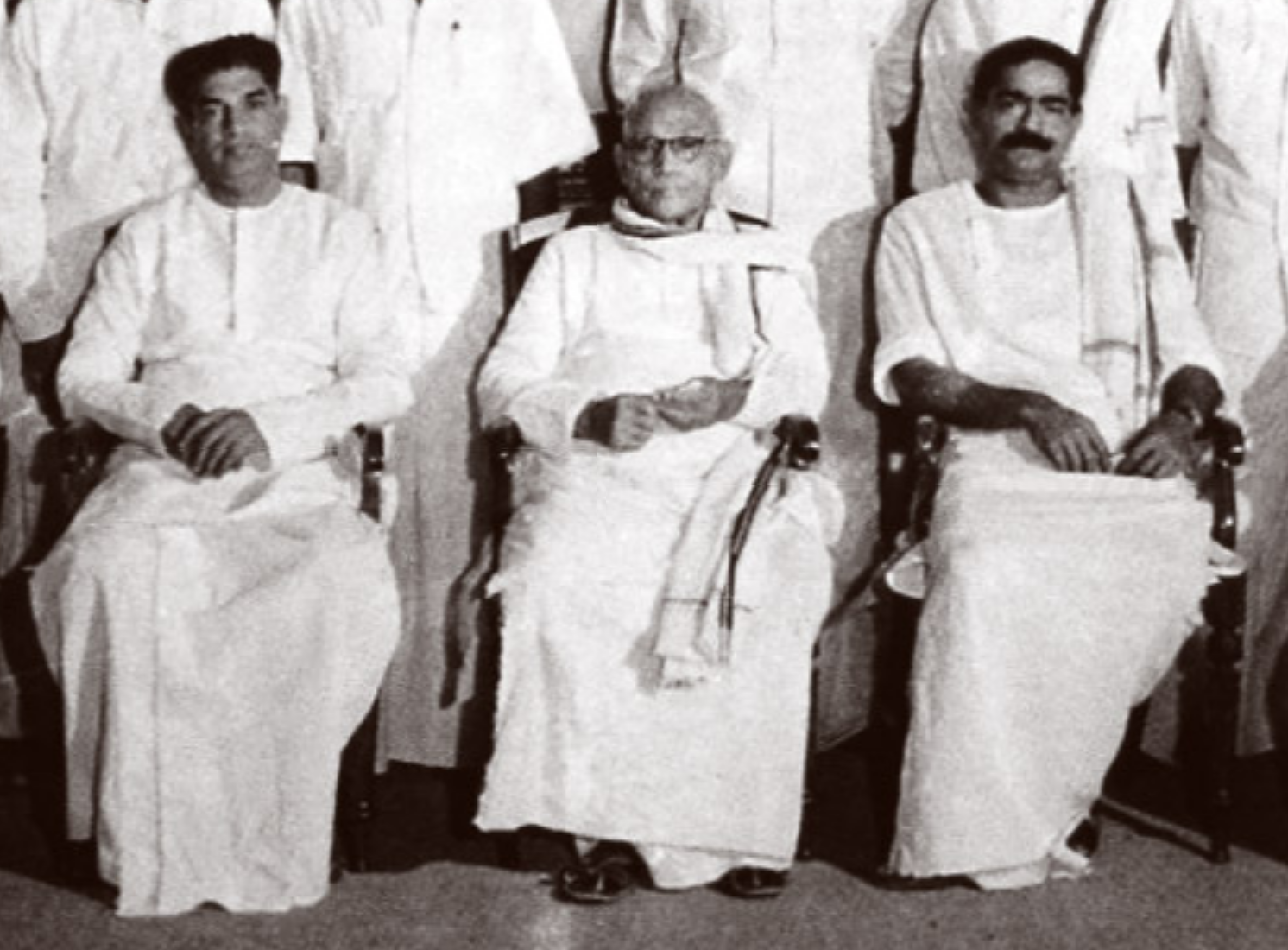
R. Sankar, Pattom A. Thanu Pillai and P. T. Chacko (February 1960)

=== In Travancore ===
P. T. Chacko was chosen as President, Kottayam D. C. C. in 1945. He served as a member of Travancore Legislative Assembly from 1948 to 1949. After the integration of the states of Travancore and Cochin, he served as a member of the Travancore-Cochin Legislative Assembly from 1949 to 1952. Chacko was the first Member of Parliament (1952–53) from Meenachil Constituency.

In 1949, Chacko was elected to the Constituent Assembly of India.

He was the Chief Whip, Indian National Congress, the Travancore Legislative Assembly in 1948, and also acted as Secretary, Congress Legislature Party, Travancore Legislative Assembly.

=== In Kerala politics ===
P. T. Chacko was elected to the first Kerala Legislative Assembly from Vazhoor in 1957 and became the first Leader of Opposition of the newly formed state of Kerala. He later played a significant role in the liberation struggle against the Communist government in Kerala.

He represented Meenachil Constituency in the second Kerala Legislative Assembly and handled the portfolio of Home Affairs, Revenue and Law in the coalition ministry headed by Praja Socialist Party leader Pattom Thanu Pillai from 22 February 1960 to 26 September 1962. In the subsequent cabinet headed by Congress leader R. Sankar, he handled the same portfolios from 26 September 1962 to 20 February 1964. He resigned from the post of Home and Revenue Minister on 20 February 1964. He was defeated in the contest for KPCC presidency in June 1964.

Chacko returned to his law practice and continued to work for the Congress party, until he abruptly succumbed to a heart attack on 31 July 1964 at the age of 49. As a defense lawyer, he was visiting the scene of a crime in Pulappara Mala in Vannathiyettu, Thottilpalam, Kavilumpara, Kozhikode District.

The P.T. Chacko Memorial is a commemorative site located in Vannathiyettu, established in memory of P. T. Chacko. The site was subsequently dedicated to his memory. Over the years, and became a local landmark.

in the Indian National Congress grouped together and forme e regional party Kerala Congress under the leadership of K. M. George and with the blessings of the Catholic Church and the Nair community leader Mannath Padmanabhan.

=== P. C. Thomas ===
P. C. Thomas, son of Chacko, represented the Muvattupuzha Parliamentary Constituency in Lok Sabha from 1989 to 2009, and also served as the Union Minister of State for Law in the National Democratic Alliance cabinet.
