= M. P. George =

Indian politician

M.P. George was the Kerala state President of Indian Federal Democratic Party (IFDP). He is leading a splinter faction of IFDP. When P. C. Thomas merged IFDP with Kerala Congress (Joseph), M. P. George retained IFDP. In 2014, with an aim for Nationalism, Federalism and Socialism, IFDP (M. P. George) merged with All India Forward Bloc.

Later he split from AIFB and formed Forward Bloc Secular, which later merged in All India Federal Bloc.
