= Cherian J. Kappan =

Indian politician

Member of Parliament for Muvattupuzha
- In office 1962–1967
- Preceded by: George Thomas Kottukapally
- Succeeded by: P. P. Esthose

Member of the Travancore–Cochin Legislative Assembly
- In office 1952–1954

Member of the Travancore State Legislature
- In office 1948–1951

Personal details
- Born: March 26, 1911 Pala, Kottayam
- Died: 1982 (aged 70–71)
- Party: Indian National Congress
- Children: 10 including Mani C. Kappan
- Parent(s): Eapen; Thresiamma
- Occupation: Member of Parliament, Member of the Legislative Assembly, Advocate

Cherian J. Kappan (also spelled as Kappen) was a Freedom fighter, Indian National Congress leader, Member of the Travancore–Cochin Legislative Assembly and Member of Parliament from Kerala, India. He was a member of Travancore State Legislature from 1948 to 1951 and M.L.A. in Travancore-Cochin Legislative Assembly from 1952 to 1954. Kappan represented Ramapuram constituency as a Congress Parliamentary Party candidate in Travancore-Cochin Legislative Assembly. He represented Muvattupuzha constituency in third Lok Sabha (1962–67). He was the first chairman of the Pala Municipality.

== Biography ==
Cherian J. Kappan was born on March 26, 1911, at Pala, Kottayam district to Eapen and Thresiamma. After his primary education from St. Thomas E. H. School, Palai, he done his graduation from St. Joseph's College, Trichi and St. Thomas College, Trichur.

After graduating from the Thiruvananthapuram Law College, Kappan started practicing as an advocate in courts in Kottayam and Pala. At first he worked jointly with P. T. Chacko, but soon became an independent lawyer. Due to severe financial pressure, Kappan shifted his legal practice to Kozhikode, but soon returned to Pala.

As an activist in Indian independence movement, Kappan was imprisoned for 3 1/2 years. Kappan also made strong speeches against Diwan Sir CP's idea of independent Travancore, instead of being part of the Indian Union.

Cherian J. Kappan died in 1982.

== Political career ==
Initially, Cherian J. Kappan's public activity was limited to the communal and social spheres. But he soon gained wide public attention as he spearheaded the agitation against Sir CP's education policies. Subsequently, he became active in the State Congress movement. He was arrested and imprisoned several times after gaining the Diwan's displeasure.

Kappan was a member of Travancore State Legislature from 1948 to 1951. From 1951 to 1954 he was M.L.A. in Travancore-Cochin Legislative Assembly. Kappan represented Ramapuram constituency as a Congress Parliamentary Party candidate in the Travancore-Cochin Legislative Assembly. He represented Muvattupuzha constituency in third Lok Sabha. He was the first chairman of the Pala Nagarasabha. He held several other positions including District Congress Committee President, President of Dist. Coperative Bank, Kottayam, executive committee member of State Cooperative Bank, president of Pepper Marketing Cooperative Society, Pala, president of Meenachil Taluka Library Union and Vice president of Catholica Congress.

The Kappan family is the main political rival of K. M. Mani's family in Pala. Mani and the Kappan family were not opposed at first. Mani started his practice as a lawyer as a junior to Cherian. But when Cherian testified against Mani in an election case, the two fell out. The Kappan family and Mani became politically opposed. Mani's first opponent from the Kappan family was Cherian's son George, who fought against him in Kerala Legislative Assembly election in 1991. Cherian's other son Mani C. Kappan fought against K. M. Mani in 2006, 2011 and 2016 Legislative Assembly elections, but lost in all. Mani C. Kappan defeated Kerala Congress (M) leader and K. M. Mani's son Jose K. Mani in the 2021 Kerala Assembly elections.

== Honors ==
Cherian J. Kappan Memorial Municipal Stadium in Pala is named after him. The stadium was given the name when the industrial training center in the municipality named after Kappan was closed.
