= C. K. Chandrappan =

Indian politician

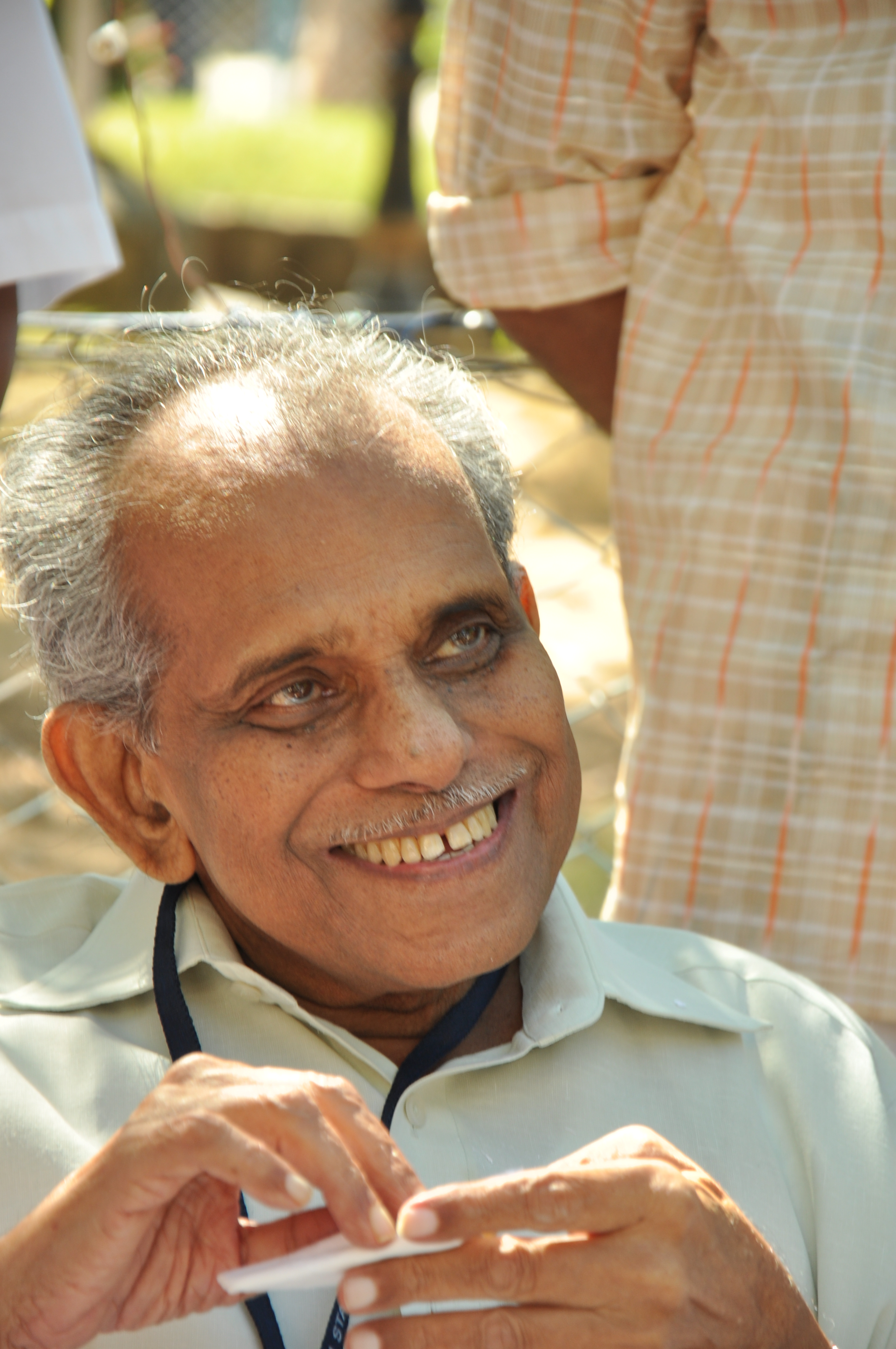
- C. K. Chandrappan

Secretary of the Communist Party of India Kerala State Council
- In office 14 November 2010 – 22 March 2012
- Preceded by: Veliyam Bhargavan
- Succeeded by: Pannyan Raveendran

Member of the Indian Parliament for Thrissur
- In office 2004–2009
- Preceded by: A. C. Jose
- Succeeded by: P. C. Chacko

Member of Kerala Legislative Assembly
- In office 2006 – 3 May 2011
- Preceded by: Vayalar Ravi
- Succeeded by: A. K. Antony
- Constituency: Cherthala

Member of the Indian Parliament for Kannur
- In office 1977–1980
- Preceded by: A.K. Gopalan
- Succeeded by: K. Kunhambu

Member of the Indian Parliament for Thalassery
- In office 1971–1977
- Preceded by: Constituency Established
- Succeeded by: Constituency Demolished

Personal details
- Born: 10 November 1935 Cherthala, Alleppey, Travancore
- Died: 23 March 2012 (aged 76) Thiruvananthapuram, Kerala
- Party: Communist Party of India (CPI)
- Parent(s): C. K. Kumara Panicker, Ammukutty Amma

Cheerapanchira Kuntirishery Chandrappan (10 November 1935 – 22 March 2012) was a politician from Kerala, India. He was associated with Communist Party of India (CPI). He was a member of the Lok Sabha of India representing the Thalassery from 1971 to 1977, Kannur from 1977 to 1980 and Thrissur from 2004 to 2009. Chandrappan served as MLA from 1991 to 1996 representing Chertala, Kerala.

== Early life ==
C. K. Chandrappan was born in Alleppey, to Ammukutty Amma and politician C. K. Kumara Panicker of the Kuntirishery family, a Vayalar tributary of the wealthy Cheerappanchira family in Muhamma, Alappuzha. Kumara Panicker was one of the frontline fighters in the legendary Punnapra-Vayalar uprising.

== Early political career ==
Chandrappan started his political life when he was a member of leftist youth federations in the 1970s. He took part in the Goa liberation movement and was jailed as a political prisoner on various occasions in Delhi, Calcutta and Trivandrum.

== Right to recall proposed bills for MP and MLA ==
Constitution (Amendment) Bill about Voter's right to recall elected representatives was introduced in Lok Sabha by C. K. Chandrappan in 1974 and Atal Bihari Vajpayee had supported this but the bill did not pass.

== Personal life and death ==
He married Bulu Roy Chowdhury in 1978. C. K. Chandrappan died in Thiruvananthapuram on 22 March 2012 at the age of 76, due to cancer.
