= K. Krishnan Warrier =

Indian politician

K. Krishnan Warrier was a Communist Party of India politician from Thrissur City. He was the Member of Parliament from Thrissur Lok Sabha constituency, Kerala, in 1957 and 1962.
