= Muvattupuzha Lok Sabha constituency =

Former Lok Sabha constituency

Coordinates: 9.98°N 76.58°E

Muvattupuzha
- Former Lok Sabha constituency

Constituency details
- Country: India
- Region: South India
- State: Kerala
- Established: 1952
- Abolished: 2008
- Reservation: None

Muvattupuzha was a Lok Sabha constituency in Kerala.It was dissolved in 2009 to allow the Formation of Wayanad Lok Sabha constituency.

== Assembly segments ==
Muvattupuzha Lok Sabha constituency was composed of the following assembly segments:

1. Kunnathunad
2. Piravom
3. Muvattupuzha
4. Kothamangalam
5. Kanjirappally
6. Poonjar
7. Palai

== Members of Parliament ==
As Meenachil in Thiru-Kochi

| Election | Member | Party |
|---|---|---|
| 1952 | P. T. Chacko | Indian National Congress |
| 1953^ | George Thomas Kottukapally | Indian National Congress |

As Muvattupuzha

| Election | Member | Party |
|---|---|---|
| 1957 | George Thomas Kottukapally | Indian National Congress |
| 1962 | Cherian J. Kappan | Indian National Congress |
| 1967 | P. P. Eidhose | Communist Party of India (Marxist) |
| 1971 | C. M. Stephen | Indian National Congress |
| 1977 | George J. Matthew | Kerala Congress |
| 1980 | George Joseph Mundackal | Independent |
| 1984 | George Joseph Mundackal | Kerala Congress (Joseph) |
| 1989 | P. C. Thomas | Kerala Congress (Mani) |
| 1991 | P. C. Thomas | Kerala Congress (Mani) |
| 1996 | P. C. Thomas | Kerala Congress (Mani) |
| 1998 | P. C. Thomas | Kerala Congress (Mani) |
| 1999 | P. C. Thomas | Kerala Congress (Mani) |
| 2004 | P. C. Thomas | Indian Federal Democratic Party (Note: however the election was reversed by the Supreme Court, it having found P. C. Thomas guilty of violations of the Electoral code) |

Muvattupuzha Lok Sabha constituency is no longer in existence due to changes in constituencies made by the Election Commission. Most parts have been merged to Kottayam, some to Idukki, Pathanamthitta and Chalakudy .

== Detailed Results ==
Vote share of Winning candidates
| 2004 | 34.38% |
| 1999 | 51.93% |
| 1998 | 54.29% |
| 1996 | 54.41% |
| 1991 | 53.98% |
| 1989 | 48.27% |
| 1984 | 59.16% |
| 1980 | 48.00% |
| 1977 | 54.94% |
| 1971 | 55.99% |
| 1967 | 44.21% |
| 1962 | 54.24% |
| 1957 | 50.85% |
| 1953 (by-poll) | 57.35% |
| 1952 | 48.63% |

=== 2004 ===
2004 Indian general election: Muvattupuzha
| Party | Candidate | Votes | % | ±% |
|---|---|---|---|---|
| IFDP | P. C. Thomas | 256,411 | 34.38 | New entry |
| CPI(M) | P. M. Ismail | 255,882 | 34.31 | ▼6.44 |
| KC(M) | Jose K. Mani | 209,880 | 28.14 | ▼23.79 |
| IND | 13 Independent Candidates | 23,698 | 3.18 | |
| Majority | | 529 | 0.07 | ▼11.11 |
| Turnout | | 745,871 | | |
| Indian Federal Democratic Party gain from KC(M) | | Swing | | |

=== 1999 ===
1999 Indian general election: Muvattupuzha
| Party | Candidate | Votes | % | ±% |
|---|---|---|---|---|
| KC(M) | P. C. Thomas | 357,402 | 51.93 | ▼2.36 |
| CPI(M) | P. M. Ismail | 280,463 | 40.75 | |
| BJP | V. V. Augustine | 47,875 | 6.96 | ▼0.77 |
| IND | C. C. Kannan | 1,100 | 0.16 | |
| IND | Thomas Joseph | 856 | 0.12 | |
| IND | John Zacharias | 568 | 0.08 | |
| Majority | | 76,939 | 11.18 | ▼6.17 |
| Turnout | | 692,278 | 67.86 | |
| KC(M) hold | | Swing | | |

=== 1998 ===
1998 Indian general election: Muvattupuzha
| Party | Candidate | Votes | % | ±% |
|---|---|---|---|---|
| KC(M) | Adv. P. C. Thomas | 356,168 | 54.29 | ▼0.12 |
| JD | Mathew John | 242,359 | 36.94 | |
| BJP | Adv. Narayanan Namboothiri | 50,738 | 7.73 | ▲3.45 |
| PDP | Palamuttam Majeed | 5,946 | 0.91 | |
| IND | U. V. Thomas | 812 | 0.12 | |
| Majority | | 113,809 | 17.35 | |
| Turnout | | 660,851 | 66.16 | |
| KC(M) hold | | Swing | | |

=== 1996 ===
1996 Indian general election: Muvattupuzha
| Party | Candidate | Votes | % | ±% |
|---|---|---|---|---|
| KC(M) | P. C. Thomas | 382,319 | 54.41 | ▲0.43 |
| IND | Baby Kurien | 260,423 | 37.06 | |
| BJP | George Kurian | 30,097 | 4.28 | ▲0.52 |
| IND | K. K. Sidhique | 11,161 | 1.59 | |
| IND | P. V. Sunny Puthiyamadom | 7,621 | 1.08 | |
| IND | Thankappan M. C. Chartav | 5,419 | 0.77 | |
| IND | Sankar Cheeran | 2,386 | 0.34 | |
| IND | Merly Johny | 1,486 | 0.21 | |
| IND | John Varghese | 1,183 | 0.17 | |
| IND | Balan Pilla Kizhakanat | 593 | 0.08 | |
| Majority | | 121,896 | 17.35 | ▲3.57 |
| Turnout | | 719,419 | 73.78 | ▼2.47 |
| KC(M) hold | | Swing | | |

=== 1991 ===
1991 Indian general election: Muvattupuzha
| Party | Candidate | Votes | % | ±% |
|---|---|---|---|---|
| KC(M) | P. C. Thomas | 384,255 | 53.98 | ▲5.71 |
| IND | P. I. Devasia | 286,152 | 40.20 | |
| BJP | N. Ajith | 26,783 | 3.76 | ▲1.38 |
| DKP (Note: Deseeya Karshaka Party) | Joseph Cherian | 4,508 | 0.63 | ▲0.61 |
| BSP | Haji Moideen Shah | 3,685 | 0.52 | |
| IND | K. V. George | 2,513 | 0.35 | |
| JP | K. T. Joseph | 1,843 | 0.26 | |
| IND | Joy Ulahannan | 1,269 | 0.18 | |
| IND | C. P. Roy | 543 | 0.08 | |
| DDP | Varkey Mathai | 296 | 0.04 | |
| Majority | | 98,103 | 13.78 | ▲4.35 |
| Turnout | | 719,001 | 76.25 | ▼5.62 |
| KC(M) hold | | Swing | | |

=== 1989 ===
1989 Indian general election: Muvattupuzha
| Party | Candidate | Votes | % | ±% |
|---|---|---|---|---|
| KC(M) | P. C. Thomas | 352,191 | 48.27 | |
| IND | C. Poulose | 283,380 | 38.84 | |
| KEC | P. J. Joseph | 68,811 | 9.43 | |
| BJP | P. J. Thomas | 17,386 | 2.38 | |
| IND | Thevan Sasthavu | 3,531 | 0.48 | |
| IND | P. J. Joseph | 1,496 | 0.21 | |
| IND | Peter Ouseph | 952 | 0.13 | |
| IND | James Joseph | 411 | 0.06 | |
| IND | Unnikrishnan Velayudhan Nair | 371 | 0.05 | |
| IND | Nicemon Mathew | 330 | 0.05 | |
| IND | Mathew Mathai | 217 | 0.03 | |
| IND | R. Gopalakrishnan Nair | 214 | 0.03 | |
| DKP | P. T. Thomas | 170 | 0.02 | |
| IND | K. A. Varkey | 134 | 0.02 | |
| Majority | | 68,811 | 9.43 | ▼11.38 |
| Turnout | | 732,761 | 81.87 | ▲5.49 |
| KC(M) gain from KC(J) | | Swing | | |

=== 1984 ===
1984 Indian general election: Muvattupuzha
| Party | Candidate | Votes | % | ±% |
|---|---|---|---|---|
| KC(J) | George Joseph Mundakkal (Baby) | 307,519 | 59.16 | |
| CPI(M) | P. P. Esthose | 199,319 | 38.35 | |
| IND | Paul Chirakkarodu | 9,186 | 1.77 | |
| IND | C. P. Mathai | 1,694 | 0.33 | |
| IND | Unnikrishnan Velayudhan Nair | 1,432 | 0.28 | |
| IND | Baby Varghese | 626 | 0.12 | |
| Majority | | 108,200 | 20.81 | |
| Turnout | | 527,328 | 76.38 | |
| KC(J) gain from Independent | | Swing | | |

=== 1980 ===
1980 Indian general election: Muvattupuzha
| Party | Candidate | Votes | % | ±% |
|---|---|---|---|---|
| IND | George Joseph (Baby Mundackal) | 172,651 | 48.00 | |
| KEC | George J. Mathew | 168,321 | 46.80 | |
| IND | N. V. George | 11,859 | 3.30 | |
| IND | M. C. Mathai | 4,867 | 1.35 | |
| IND | C. P. Mathai | 1,183 | 0.33 | |
| IND | T. N. Parameshwaran Pallai | 809 | 0.22 | |
| Majority | | 4,330 | 1.20 | |
| Turnout | | 363,029 | 57.20 | |
| Independent gain from KEC | | Swing | | |

=== 1977 ===
1977 Indian general election: Muvattupuzha
| Party | Candidate | Votes | % | ±% |
|---|---|---|---|---|
| KEC | George J. Mathew | 249,287 | 54.94 | |
| KC(B) | K. M. Joseph Kuruppamadham | 204,467 | 45.06 | |
| Majority | | 44,820 | 9.88 | |
| Turnout | | 460,769 | 82.16 | |
| KEC gain from INC | | Swing | | |

=== 1971 ===
1971 Indian general election: Muvattupuzha
| Party | Candidate | Votes | % | ±% |
|---|---|---|---|---|
| INC | C. M. Stephen | 178,244 | 55.99 | |
| IND | George Joseph (Mundakal Baby) | 140,107 | 44.01 | |
| Majority | | 38,137 | 11.98 | |
| Turnout | | 321,367 | 64.18 | |
| INC gain from CPI(M) | | Swing | | |

=== 1967 ===
1967 Indian general election: Muvattupuzha
| Party | Candidate | Votes | % | ±% |
|---|---|---|---|---|
| CPI(M) | P. P. Esthose | 140,403 | 44.21 | |
| INC | K. M. Chandy | 98,249 | 30.93 | |
| KEC | A. Thoyil | 70,010 | 22.04 | |
| IND | N. A. Nair | 8,940 | 2.81 | |
| Majority | | 42,154 | 13.28 | |
| Turnout | | 327,971 | 77.42 | |
| CPI(M) gain from INC | | Swing | | |

=== 1962 ===
1962 Indian general election: Muvattupuzha
| Party | Candidate | Votes | % | ±% |
|---|---|---|---|---|
| INC | Cherian | 157,735 | 54.24 | |
| CPI | Jacob | 133,087 | 45.76 | |
| Majority | | 24,648 | 8.48 | |
| Turnout | | 296,137 | 63.32 | |
| INC hold | | Swing | | |

=== 1957 ===
1957 Indian general election: Muvattupuzha
| Party | Candidate | Votes | % | ±% |
|---|---|---|---|---|
| INC | George Thomas | 123,483 | 50.85 | |
| CPI | K. T. Jacob | 96,241 | 39.63 | |
| IND | P. I. Ignatius | 23,120 | 9.52 | |
| PSP | Emmanuel Paikeday | 0 | 0.00 | |
| Majority | | 27,242 | 11.22 | |
| Turnout | | 242,844 | 62.39 | |
| INC hold | | Swing | | |

=== 1953 by-election ===
1953 Lok Sabha by-election: Meenachil
| Party | Candidate | Votes | % | ±% |
|---|---|---|---|---|
| INC | Thomas | 157,006 | 57.35 | |
| IND | Accamma | 116,747 | 42.65 | |
| Majority | | 40,259 | 14.71 | |
| Turnout | | | | |
| INC hold | | Swing | | |

=== 1952 ===
1951–52 Indian general election: Meenachil
| Party | Candidate | Votes | % | ±% |
|---|---|---|---|---|
| INC | P. T. Chacko | 130,245 | 48.63 | |
| IND | Madhavan Pillai | 79,895 | 29.83 | |
| RPI | Manuel Paikedy | 43,115 | 16.10 | |
| IND | Joseph Thelly | 14,574 | 5.44 | |
| Majority | | 50,350 | 18.80 | |
| Turnout | | 267,829 | 75.39 | |
| INC win (new seat) | | | | |

== See also ==
- Muvattupuzha
- List of constituencies of the Lok Sabha
