= A. C. Jose =

Indian politician (1937–2016)

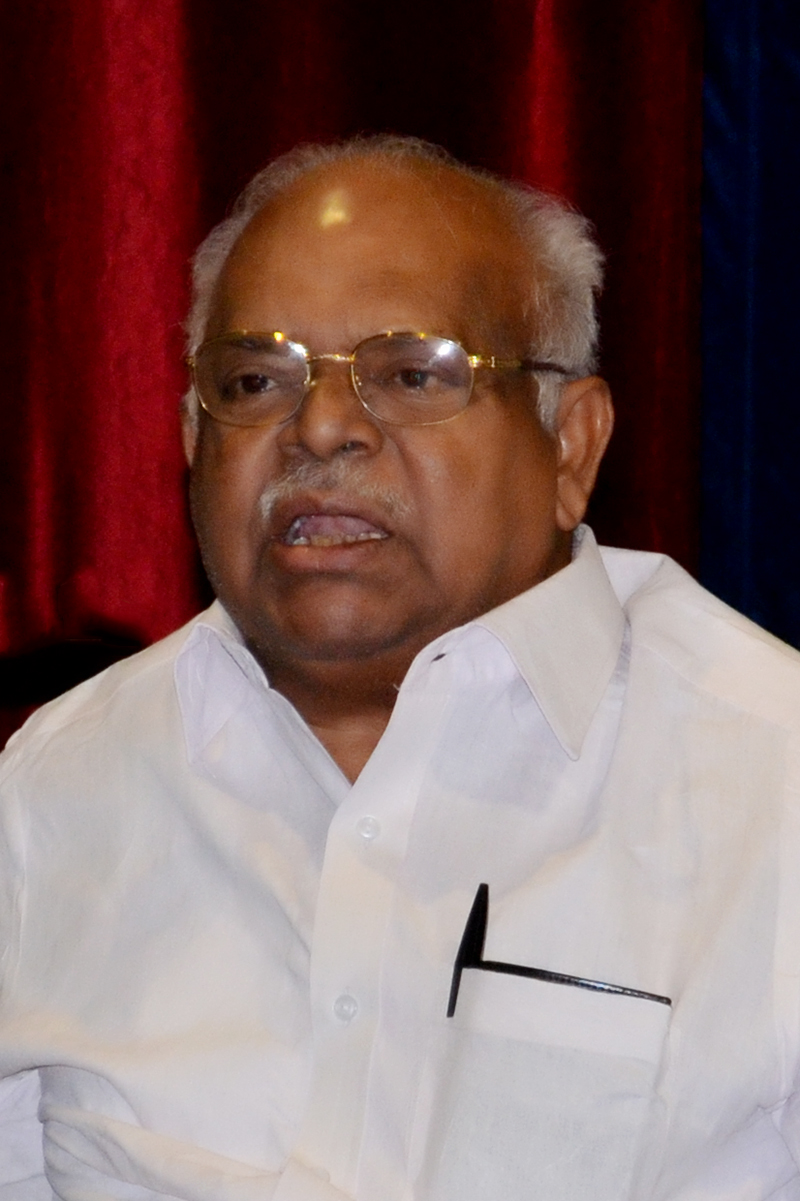

Member of Parliament, Lok Sabha
- In office 1996–2004
- Preceded by: V. V. Raghavan
- Succeeded by: C. K. Chandrappan
- Constituency: Thrissur

Speaker of Kerala Legislature
- In office 3 February 1982 – 23 June 1982
- Preceded by: A. P. Kurian
- Succeeded by: Vakkom Purushothaman
- Constituency: Parur

Personal details
- Born: 5 February 1937 Edapally, Travancore, British India
- Died: 23 January 2016 (aged 78) Kochi, Kerala, India
- Party: Indian National Congress
- Spouse: Prof. Leelamma Jose
- Education: St. Albert's College, Government Law College, Ernakulam

Ambat Chacko Jose (5 February 1937 – 23 January 2016) was an Indian politician. He was Speaker of the Kerala Legislative Assembly and a Member of Parliament from Thrissur and Idukki constituencies in Kerala. The Times of India calls him The Always Casting Jose of Kerala as he saved the K. Karunakaran government by exercising his casting vote a record seven times in around 80 days as the ruling United Democratic Front and the opposition Left Democratic Front faced a 70–70 tie in the Kerala assembly.

== Biography ==
A. C. Jose was born on 5 February 1937 in Edapally, Ernakulam. He belonged to the well known Ambat family. He studied at St. Alberts College, and Government Law College and took his B.Sc and LLM degrees. He played a major role in the formation of Kerala Students Union. From 1969 to 1979 he was a councillor in the Cochin City Corporation and in 1972 he was elected as its mayor. He was elected to the Kerala Legislative Assembly from Parur in 1980. He served as Speaker of Kerala Legislative Assembly in 1982.

He was elected as MP in the 1996, 1998, 1999 general elections, serving in the 11th, 12th and 13th Lok Sabha. He was the chief editor of Veekshanam Daily, a mouthpiece of the Indian National Congress in Kerala. He died on 23 January 2016 aged 79 after a heart attack. He was buried with full state honours in Ernakulam, his hometown.

== Electoral History ==
=== Lok Sabha ===
Year	Constituency	Party	Votes	%	Opponent	Party	Votes	%	Result	Margin	%
1996	Idukki	INC	350,679	48.84	K. Francis George	KEC	320,539	44.64	Won	▲30,140	▲4.20
1998	Mukundapuram	INC	347,945	46.71	P. Govindappillai	CPI(M)	338,996	45.50	Won	▲8,949	▲1.21
1999	Trichur	INC	343,793	47.07	V.V. Raghavan	CPI	332,161	45.48	Won	▲11,632	▲1.59
2004	Trichur	INC	274,999	39.99	C. K. Chandrappan	CPI	320,960	46.67	Lost	▼45,961	▼6.68
