= Ninan Koshy =

Indian politician

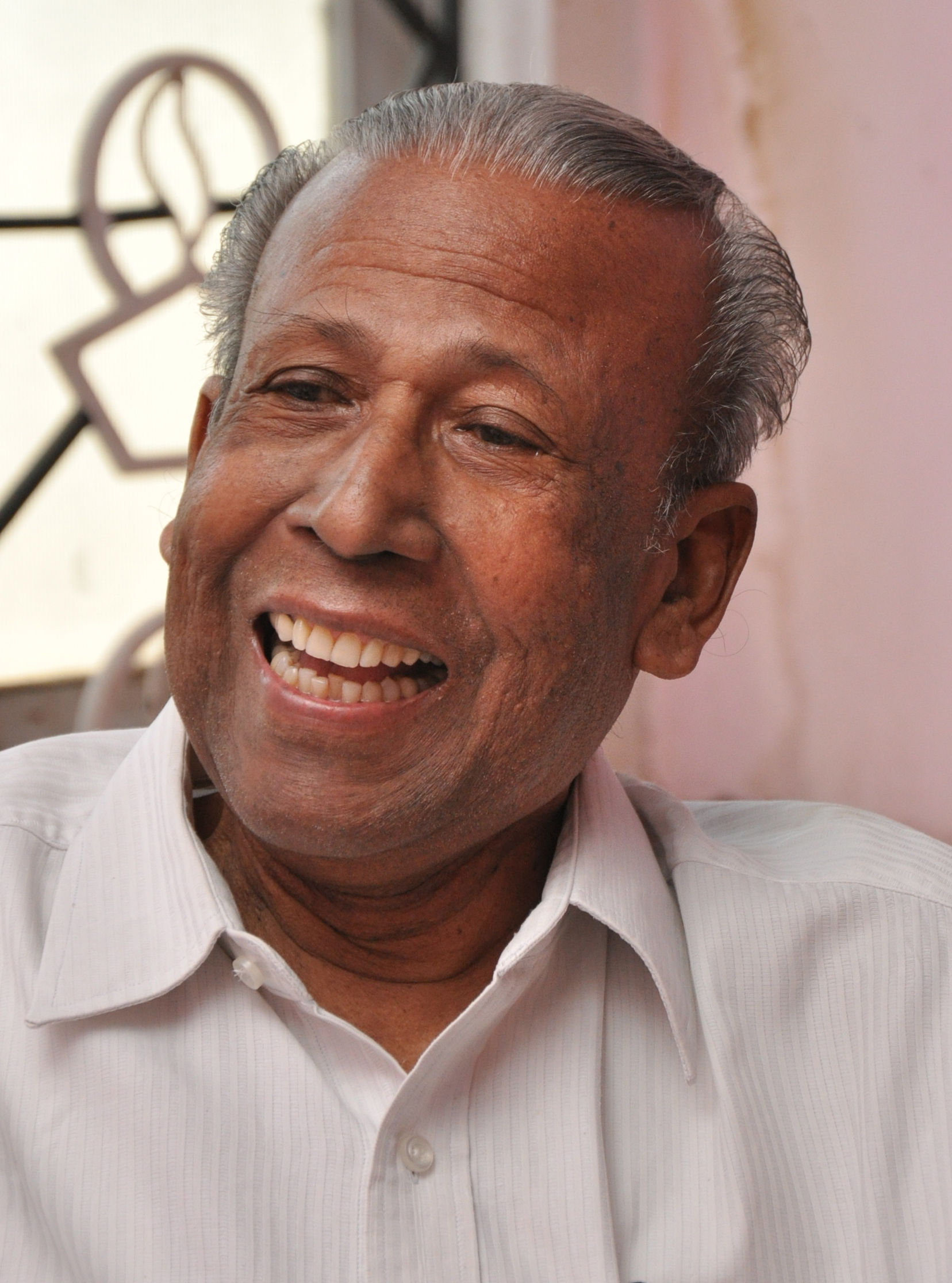
- Born: February 1, 1934; Thiruvalla
- Died: March 4, 2015 (aged 81)

Ninan Koshy (1 February 1934 – 4 March 2015) was an Indian political thinker, foreign affairs expert, theologian and social analyst.

== Life ==
He was born in 1934 in Thiruvalla. Former director of the WCC's Commission of the Churches on International Affairs. He was an LDF candidate from Mavelikkara Constituency in 1999 General Election. He is also well known as a thinker, social activist, author and orator.

Koshy served on a committee to draft Kerala's policy on higher education in 2007. He died in Thiruvananthapuram on 4 March 2015, aged 81.
