= Thrissur Lok Sabha constituency =

Lok Sabha Constituency in Kerala

Coordinates: 10.5°N 76.2°E

Thrissur KL-08
- Lok Sabha constituency
- Thrissur Lok Sabha constituency

Constituency details
- Country: India
- Region: South India
- State: Kerala
- Assembly constituencies: Guruvayur Manalur Ollur Thrissur Nattika Irinjalakuda Puthukkad
- Established: 1951
- Reservation: None

Member of Parliament
- 18th Lok Sabha
- Incumbent Suresh Gopi
- Party: BJP
- Alliance: NDA
- Elected year: 2024

Thrissur Lok Sabha constituency is one of the 20 Lok Sabha (parliamentary) constituencies in the state of Kerala in southern India.

== Assembly segments ==
Thrissur Lok Sabha constituency is composed of the following assembly segments:

No	Name	District	MLA	Party	2024 lead
63	Guruvayur	Thrissur	N. K. Akbar	CPI(M)	INC
64	Manalur	Thrissur	Murali Perunelly	CPI(M)	BJP
66	Ollur	Thrissur	K. Rajan	CPI	BJP
67	Thrissur	Thrissur	Rajan Pallan	INC	BJP
68	Nattika (SC)	Thrissur	Geetha Gopi	CPI	BJP
70	Irinjalakuda	Thrissur	Thomas Unniyadan	KEC	BJP
71	Puthukkad	Thrissur	K. K. Ramachandran	CPI(M)	BJP

== Members of Parliament ==
Year	Member	Party
1952	Iyyunni Chalakka	Indian National Congress
1957	K. Krishnan Warrier	Communist Party of India
1962	K. Krishnan Warrier	Communist Party of India
1967	C. Janardhanan	Communist Party of India
1971	C. Janardhanan	Communist Party of India
1977	K. A. Rajan	Communist Party of India
1980	K. A. Rajan	Communist Party of India
1984	P. A. Antony	Indian National Congress
1989	P. A. Antony	Indian National Congress
1991	P. C. Chacko	Indian National Congress
1996	V. V. Raghavan	Communist Party of India
1998	V. V. Raghavan	Communist Party of India
1999	A. C. Jose	Indian National Congress
2004	C. K. Chandrappan	Communist Party of India
2009	P. C. Chacko	Indian National Congress
2014	C. N. Jayadevan	Communist Party of India
2019	T. N. Prathapan	Indian National Congress
2024	Suresh Gopi	Bharatiya Janata Party

== Election results ==
=== General Elections 2029 ===
2029 Indian general election: Thrissur
Party	Candidate	Votes	%	±%
UDF				
LDF				
NDA				
NOTA	None of the above			
Margin of victory				
Turnout				
		Swing		

=== General Election 2024 ===
2024 Indian general election: Thrissur
Party	Candidate	Votes	%	±%
BJP	Suresh Gopi	412,338	37.80	▲9.61
CPI	V. S. Sunil Kumar	337,652	30.95	▲0.10
INC	K. Muraleedharan	328,124	30.08	▼9.75
NOTA	None of the above	6,072	0.56	▲0.15
Majority		74,686	6.90	▼2.08
Turnout		1,092,574	73.63	▼4.32
BJP gain from INC		Swing		

By Assembly Segments
No.	Status (Assembly Constituency)	Votes			Lead
No.	Status (Assembly Constituency)	Suresh Gopi	V. S. Sunil Kumar	K. Muraleedharan	Lead
63	Guruvayoor	45,049	50,519	57,925	7,406
64	Manalur	61,196	53,183	50,897	8,013
66	Ollur	58,966	48,633	47,639	10,363
67	Thrissur	55,057	34,253	40,940	14,117
68	Nattika (SC)	66,854	52,909	38,195	13,945
70	Irinjalakuda	59,515	45,022	46,499	13,016
71	Puthukkad	62,635	49,943	42,719	12,692

=== General election, 2019 ===
According to Election Commission, there are 12,93,744 registered voters in Thrissur Constituency for 2019 Lok Sabha Election.

2019 Indian general election: Thrissur
Party	Candidate	Votes	%	±%
INC	T. N. Prathapan	415,089	39.83	▲1.71
CPI	Rajaji Mathew Thomas	321,456	30.85	▼11.42
BJP	Suresh Gopi	293,822	28.19	▲17.04
NOTA	None of the above	4,253	0.41	▼0.68
Majority		93,633	8.98	
Turnout		1,042,122	77.94	
INC gain from CPI		Swing		

=== General election, 2014 ===
2014 Indian general election: Thrissur
Party	Candidate	Votes	%	±%
CPI	C. N. Jayadevan	389,209	42.27	▼1.87
INC	K. P. Dhanapalan	350,982	38.12	▼9.11
BJP	K. P. Sreesan	102,681	11.15	▲4.45
AAP	Sarah Joseph	44,638	4.85	N/A
NOTA	None of the above	10,050	1.09	−−−
Margin of victory		38,227	4.15	+1.06
Turnout		920,505	72.15	
CPI gain from INC		Swing	7.24	

=== General election, 2009 ===
2009 Indian general election: Thrissur
Party	Candidate	Votes	%	±%
INC	P. C. Chacko	385,297	47.1	
CPI	C. N. Jayadevan	360,146	44.1	
BJP	Rema Regunandan	54,680	6.7	
Margin of victory		25,151	3.1	
Turnout		815,856	69.5	
INC gain from CPI		Swing		

=== General election, 2004 ===
2004 Indian general election: Thrissur
Party	Candidate	Votes	%	±%
CPI	C. K. Chandrappan	320,960	46.7	
INC	A. C. Jose	2,74,999	40.0	
BJP	P. S. Sreeraman	72,042	10.5	
Margin of victory		45,961		
Turnout				
CPI gain from INC		Swing		

=== General election, 1999 ===
1999 Indian general election: Thrissur
Party	Candidate	Votes	%	±%
INC	A. C. Jose	343,793	47.07	
CPI	V. V. Raghavan	3,32,161	45.48	
BJP	A. S. Radhakrishnan	44,354	6.07	
Margin of victory		11,632	1.59	
Turnout		730,417	68.80	
INC gain from CPI		Swing		

=== General election, 1998 ===
1998 Indian general election: Thrissur
Party	Candidate	Votes	%	±%
CPI	V. V. Raghavan	340,216	47.04	
INC	K. Muraleedharan	3,21,807	44.50	
BJP	P M Gopinadhan	58,386	8.07	
Margin of victory		18,409	1.56	
Turnout		723,190	71.22	
CPI hold		Swing		

=== General election, 1996 ===
1996 Indian general election: Thrissur
Party	Candidate	Votes	%	±%
CPI	V. V. Raghavan	308,482	44.67	
INC	K. Karunakaran	3,07,002	44.45	
BJP	Rema Reghunandan	41,139	5.96	
Margin of victory		1,480	0.28	
Turnout		708,216	71.16	
CPI gain from INC		Swing		

== See also ==
- 2019 Indian general election in Kerala
- 2014 Indian general election in Kerala
- List of constituencies of the Lok Sabha
- Thrissur
