= Ottapalam Lok Sabha constituency =

Former constituency of the Indian parliament in Kerala

Coordinates: 10.78°N 76.37°E

Ottapalam
- Former Lok Sabha constituency

Constituency details
- Country: India
- Region: South India
- State: Kerala
- Established: 1977
- Abolished: 2008
- Reservation: SC

Ottapalam was a Lok Sabha constituency in Kerala. The seat was reserved for scheduled castes. It was replaced by Alathur Lok Sabha Constituency in 2009.

== Assembly segments ==
Ottapalam Lok Sabha constituency is composed of the following assembly segments:

1. Thrithala
2. Pattambi
3. Ottapalam
4. Coyalmannam
5. Chelakara
6. Wadakkanchery
7. Kunnamkulam

== Members of Parliament ==
Election	Member	Party	Tenure
1977	K. Kunhambu	Indian National Congress	1977-80
1980	A.K. Balan	Communist Party of India (Marxist)	1980-84
1984	K.R. Narayanan	Indian National Congress	1984-89
1989	K.R. Narayanan	Indian National Congress	1989-91
1991	K.R. Narayanan	Indian National Congress	1991-92
1993	Sivaraman	Communist Party of India (Marxist)	1993-96
1996	S. Ajaya Kumar	Communist Party of India (Marxist)	1996-98
1998	S. Ajaya Kumar	Communist Party of India (Marxist)	1998-99
1999	S. Ajaya Kumar	Communist Party of India (Marxist)	1999-2004
2004	S. Ajaya Kumar	Communist Party of India (Marxist)	2004-09

== See also ==
- Ottapalam
- List of constituencies of the Lok Sabha
