= V. V. Raghavan =

Indian politician

Minister of Agriculture
- In office 2 April 1987 – 17 June 1991
- Constituency: Cherpu

Personal details
- Born: 23 June 1923
- Died: 27 October 2004 (aged 81)
- Political party: Communist Party of India
- Spouse: C. Sathyabhama
- Children: 2
- Relatives: C. Achutha Menon (Brother-in-law)

V. V. Raghavan (23 June 1923 – 27 October 2004) was a Communist Party of India (CPI) politician from Thrissur, Kerala. He was the Member of Parliament from Thrissur Lok Sabha constituency for the 11th and 12th Lok Sabha.

== History ==
V. V. Raghavan was born on 23 June 1923 as the son of Velappan.

He entered politics by participating in the Cochin Praja Mandal struggle for responsible Government in the state, he later joined Kerala Socialist Party and participated in the Freedom struggle. He had also to endure police brutality and imprisonment, in connection with the "Rajendra Maidan" incident, during this time.

A strong supporter of the cause of have nots and downtrodden, he joined CPI, during his period of imprisonment in 1948 and worked among labourers and organised underground activities for two years. His acquaintance with C. Achutha Menon, who became his brother-in-law later, served a great deal, to mould his political outlook profoundly.

Raghavan was elected to Kerala Legislative Assembly twice, from Cherpu constituency, as a member of CPI in the 8th and 9th KLA. Raghavan served as the Minister for Agriculture in the Second E. K. Nayanar ministry from 2 April 1987 to 17 June 1991. He was the chief architect of ‘Fayalil ninnum Vayalilekku’. Raghavan was subsequently elected to Lok Sabha in 1996 and 1998 from Thrissur Parliamentary constituency and subsequently to the Rajya Sabha in 2000.

Earlier, he had also been elected to the Thrissur Municipal Council thrice. A lover of literature and arts, he has published many articles and has also authored a book In the Land of Lenin, which had won the Soviet Land Nehru award in 1977. His wife is C. Sathyabhama and they have one son and one daughter.

V. V. Raghavan died on 27 October 2004, while serving as a member of Rajya Sabha.
