= Indian Federal Democratic Party =

- Leader: P. C. Thomas
- Founder: P. C. Thomas
- Split from: Kerala Congress (M)
- Succeeded by: Kerala Congress

Election symbol
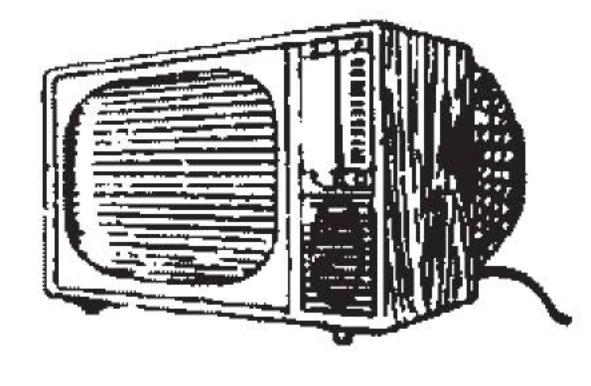

The Indian Federal Democratic Party was a political party in India. In the 2004 Lok Sabha elections IFDP won one seat from Kerala, where P. C. Thomas defeated Jose K. Mani of Kerala Congress (M). That was the first parliamentary electoral victory of a National Democratic Alliance member in the state.

In 2005, IFDP merged with the Kerala Congress of P. J. Joseph. A breakaway faction of IFDP led by M. P. George split from the party. In 2014, this faction merged with All India Forward Bloc.
