= S. Ajaya Kumar =

Indian politician

Member of Parliament, Lok Sabha
- In office 1996–2009
- Preceded by: S. Sivaraman
- Succeeded by: constituency abolished
- Constituency: Ottapalam

Personal details
- Born: 20 July 1964 (age 61) Palakkad, Kerala
- Party: Communist Party of India (Marxist)
- Spouse: A. Preetha
- Children: Ajinth Ajay, Anjitha Ajayan
- As of 23 September, 2006

S. Ajaya Kumar (born 20 July 1964) is an Indian politician who was a member of the 11th, 12th, 13th and 14th Lok Sabha . He represented the Ottapalam constituency of Kerala and is a member of the Communist Party of India (Marxist).
