= M. T. Padma =

Indian politician (1943–2024)

Minister for Fisheries, Rural Development and Registration
- In office 02-07-1991 to 16-03-1995,

Minister for Fisheries and Registration
- In office 03-05-1995 to 09-05-1996.

M. T. Padma (9 January 1943 – 12 November 2024) was an Indian politician from the state of Kerala.

== Life and career ==
Padma was active in student politics, and served as vice president of the Kerala Students Union. She contested the 1982 Kerala Vidhan Sabha election as a Congress (I) candidate, but was not elected. She again contested the 1987 and 1991 elections and was elected to represent the Koyilandy constituency. She served as Minister for Fisheries and Rural Development 1991–1995 and as Minister of Fisheries and Registration 1995–1996.

Padma contested the Palakkad seat in the 1999 Lok Sabha election, but was defeated by N.N. Krishnadas by a margin of 30,000 votes. She contested the Vatakara seat in the 2004 Lok Sabha election, but was defeated by P. Sathidevi of the CPI(M) by a margin of more than 130,000 votes.

She later joined the Democratic Indira Congress (Karunakaran).

As of 2013, she was the Leader of the Opposition in the Kozhikode City Corporation.

Padma died in Mumbai on 12 November 2024, at the age of 81.
