= P. C. Thomas =

Indian politician (born 1950)

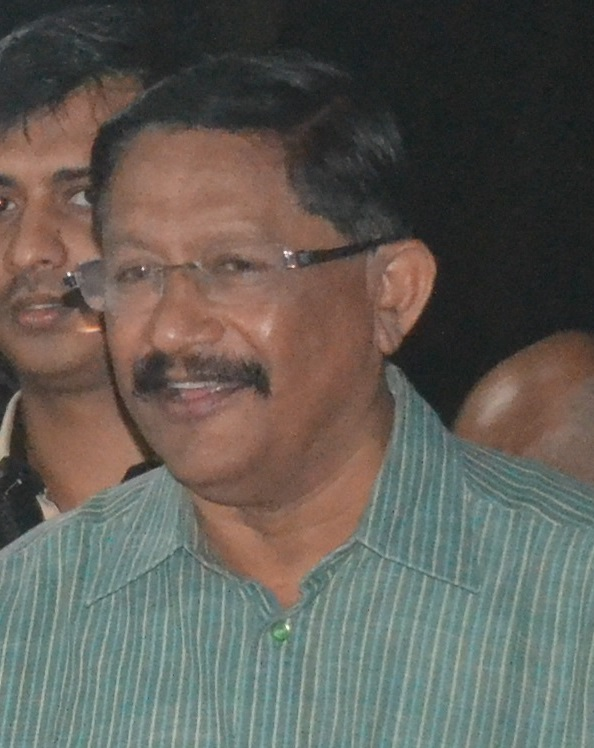

Union Minister of State for Law and Justice
- In office 24 May 2003 – 22 May 2004
- Prime Minister: Atal Bihari Vajpayee
- Minister: Arun Jaitley
- Preceded by: Ravi Shankar Prasad
- Succeeded by: K. Venkatapathy

Member of Parliament, Lok Sabha
- In office 1989 – 2006
- Preceded by: George Joseph Mundackal
- Succeeded by: Office abolished
- Constituency: Muvattupuzha

Personal details
- Born: 31 October 1950 (age 75) Kanjirappally, Kottayam, State of Travancore–Cochin (present day Kerala), India
- Party: Kerala Congress
- Other political affiliations: Kerala Congress (M) (till 2004)
- Spouse: Marykutty Thomas
- Children: 3
- Education: Sainik School Kazhakootam
- As of 23 September, 2006

Pulloli Chacko Thomas (born 31 October 1950) is an Indian politician who was Union Minister of State for Law and Justice for Kerala from 2003 to 2004 and a six-term member of Lok Sabha from 1989 to 2009. He is the Deputy Chairman of Kerala Congress.

== Career ==
Thomas was a member of Lok Sabha from 9th Lok Sabha to 14th Lok Sabha, serving for 20 years from 1989 to 2009. He was also Union Minister of State for Law and Justice from 2003 to 2004 in the Third Vajpayee Ministry.

His first contest in General election was in 1987, from Vazhoor Legislate Assembly Constituency, which he lost. Later in 1989 he contested the Lok Sabha election from Muvattupuzha as the candidate of Kerala Congress (M) and defeated Left Democratic Front (LDF) candidate P. P. Esthos and P. J. Joseph, another Kerala Congress leader. He won all subsequent elections from the constituency till 2009. His contest in 2004 as the candidate of National Democratic Alliance (NDA), where he defeated the candidates of both United Democratic Front (UDF) and LDF, was considered a landmark victory in the political history of Kerala. However, the Supreme Court of India cancelled the results and disqualified him in 2006 on the ground that he used his religious background to woo voters during the polls.

In 1986, P. C. Thomas was chosen to serve on Kerala's 6th Bar Council.

After his Lok Sabha term, he has filed about 15 public interest litigations as part-in-person, in the High Court of Kerala and Supreme Court of India

In 2006, when Finance Minister P. Chidambaram made an announcement that the Government of India will issue a commemorative coin dedicated to the 150th anniversary of Sree Narayana Guru, P. C. Thomas suggested that coin' logo should be written both in Hindi and English.

Since 2010, Thomas is the chairman of Kerala Congress (Thomas). Currently the party is in alliance with National Democratic Alliance (NDA), of which he is a National Committee member. He is also the Chairman of ‘Karshaka Sanghatana Aikyavedi’, a farmers' non-political organization which is a platform of several associations of various types of farmers’ organizations in Kerala including those of natural rubber farmers.

In 2019, P. C. Thomas ran for election again, this time from Kottayam Lok Sabha constituency, however he came third in the election which was won by Thomas Chazhikadan of Kerala Congress (Mani).

On 17 March 2021, he announced that his party has left NDA alliance and joined UDF. The party would merge with P.J. Joseph led-Kerala Congress (Joseph) and form Kerala Congress.

== Electoral History ==
=== Lok Sabha ===
| Year | Constituency | Party | Votes | % | Opponent | Party | Votes | % | Result | Margin | % |
|---|---|---|---|---|---|---|---|---|---|---|---|
| 1989 | Muvattupuzha | KC(M) | 352,191 | 48.27 | C. Poulose | IND | 283,380 | 38.84 | Won | ▲68,811 | ▲9.43 |
| 1991 | Muvattupuzha | KC(M) | 384,255 | 53.98 | P. I. Devasia | IND | 286,152 | 40.20 | Won | ▲98,103 | ▲13.78 |
| 1996 | Muvattupuzha | KC(M) | 382,319 | 54.41 | Baby Kurien | IND | 260,423 | 37.06 | Won | ▲121,896 | ▲17.35 |
| 1998 | Muvattupuzha | KC(M) | 356,168 | 54.29 | Mathew John | JD | 242,359 | 36.94 | Won | ▲113,809 | ▲17.35 |
| 1999 | Muvattupuzha | KC(M) | 357,402 | 51.93 | Adv. P. M. Ismail | CPI(M) | 280,463 | 40.75 | Won | ▲76,939 | ▲11.18 |
| 2004 | Muvattupuzha | IFDP | 256,411 | 34.38 | Adv. P. M. Ismail | CPI(M) | 255,882 | 34.31 | Won | ▲529 | ▲0.07 |
| 2019 | Kottayam | KEC | 155,135 | 17.04 | Thomas Chazhikadan | KC(M) | 421,046 | 46.24 | Lost | ▼265,911 | ▼29.20 |

== Personal life ==
P. C. Thomas is the fourth child of P. T. Chacko and Mariyamma Chacko. Pullolil House is his residence. His father P. T. Chacko was a political stalwart who was a member of Indian Constituent Assembly representing Travancore-Cochin from 1949, a member representing Meenachil Lok Sabha Constituency in the first Lok Sabha in 1952, first opposition leader of the Kerala Legislative Assembly in 1957 and the Home Minister in Pattom Thanu PillaiI's ministry. Thomas has two sons and a daughter.
