= 2014 Indian general election in Kerala =

Indian general election 2014

2014 Indian general election
- April–May 2014

20 seats
- Turnout: 73.89% (▲0.51%)
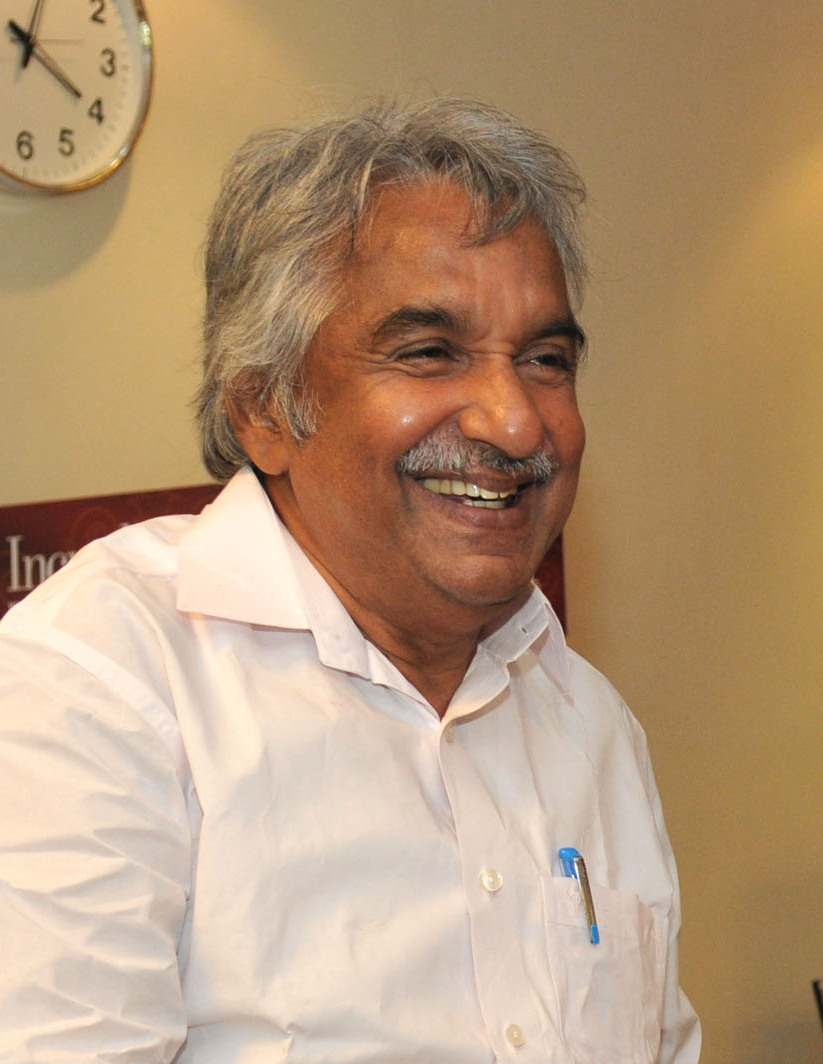

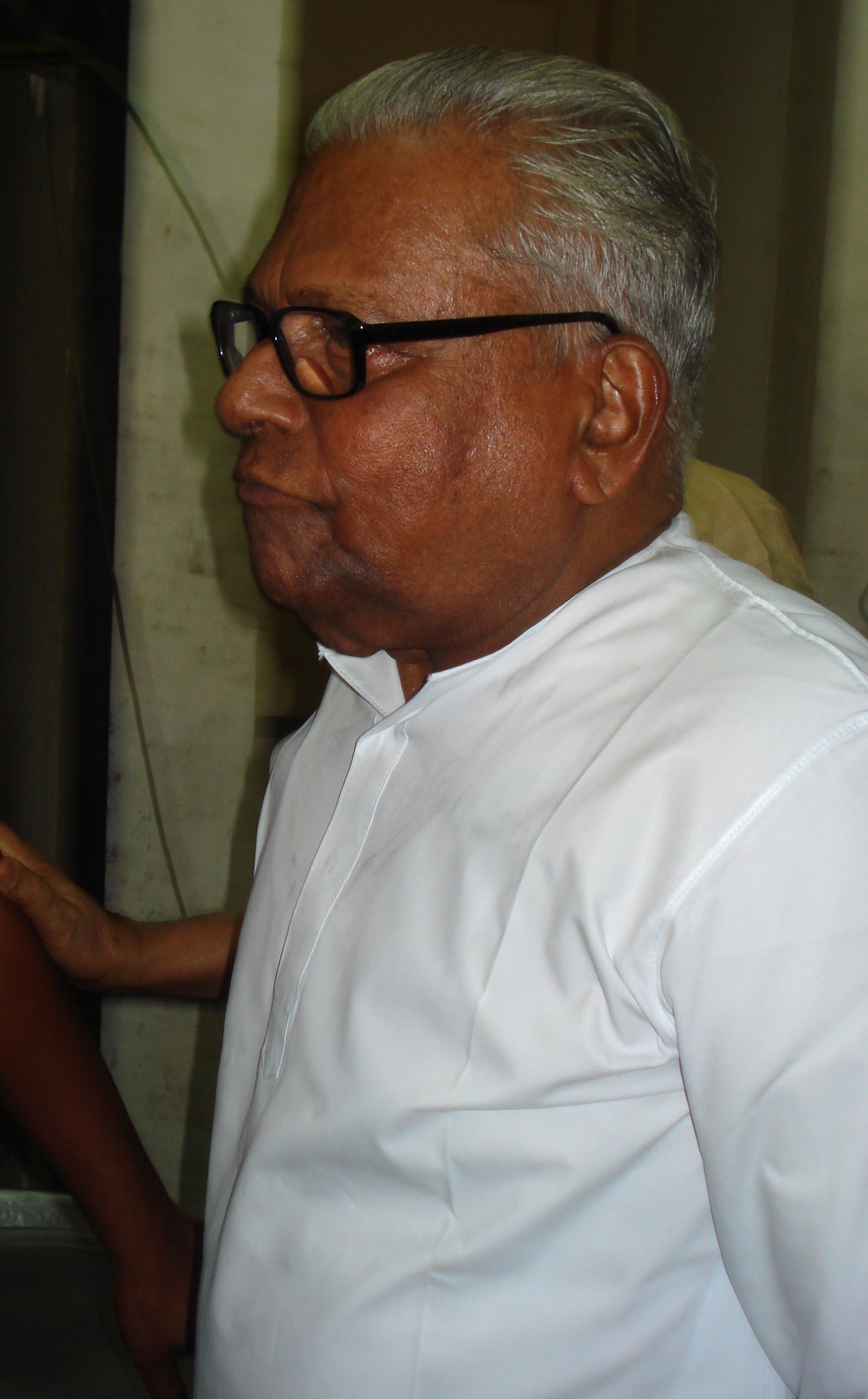

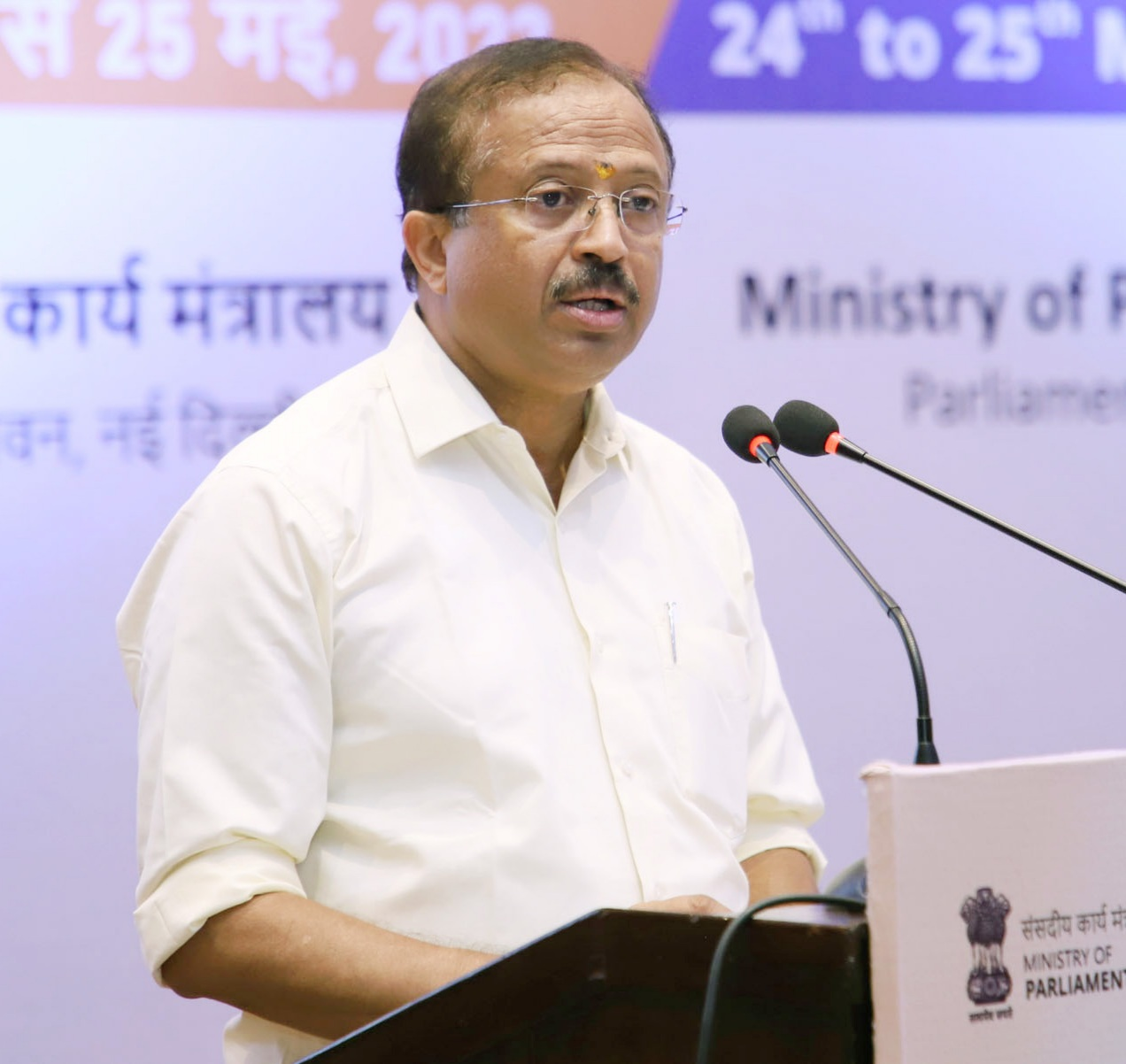
	First party	Second party	Third party
Leader	Oommen Chandy	V. S. Achuthanandan	V. Muraleedharan
Party	INC	CPI(M)	BJP
Alliance	UDF	LDF	NDA
Leader's seat	-	-	-
Last election	16	4	0
Seats won	12	8	0
Seat change	▼4	▲4	0
Percentage	41.98%	40.12%	10.33%

The 2014 Indian general election polls in Kerala were held for the twenty Lok Sabha seats in the state on 10 April 2014. The total voter strength of Kerala for the election was 2,42,51,937 and 73.89% of voters exercised their right to do so. The results of the elections were declared on 16 May 2014.

== Background ==
The United Progressive Alliance (UPA) government under the premiership of Manmohan Singh completed its second term in May 2014 and general election was conducted to form a government to head the largest democracy in the world. The United Democratic Front (UDF), aligned to the national coalition of the UPA, the incumbent ruling alliance in the state legislature after wresting power from the Left Democratic Front (LDF), in the state assembly election of 2011. The buildup to this election saw parties shifting allegiance from both the prominent coalitions.

== Alliances and parties ==
As in the previous general elections in the recent history of the state, the key alliances that fought for representation of Lok Sabha seats in Kerala in the 2014 general election are the UDF which is the Kerala state legislative alliance aligned with the UPA at the national level and the LDF comprising primarily the CPI(M) and the CPI. The nationally relevant National Democratic Alliance (NDA) has not had any success in general elections in Kerala so far but set up their candidates in all constituencies of the state. A new force in the election is the Left United Front. The debutant Aam Aadmi Party fielded candidates in fifteen of the twenty seats.

=== United Democratic Front ===
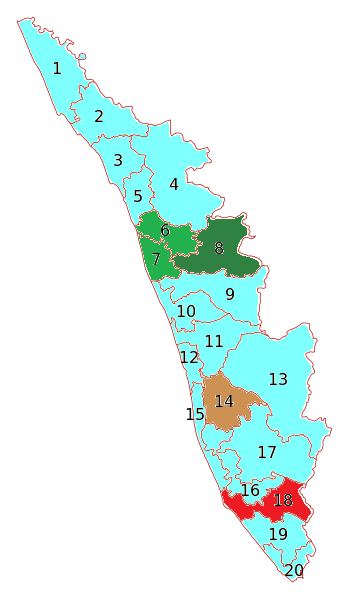
UDF seat sharing in Kerala

The United Democratic Front alliance saw the addition of two parties since the previous general election of 2009 while parting ways with one party that did not have any representation in the state legislature. The Socialist Janata (Democratic) (SJ(D)) joined the UDF in August 2010 splitting away from its parent Janata Dal (S) while the left leaning RSP docked itself to the UDF in March 2014, after the announcement of the general election.

United Democratic Front
Party	Flag	Symbol	Leader	Seats
Indian National Congress				15
Indian Union Muslim League				2
Kerala Congress (M)				1
Socialist Janata (Democratic)				1
Revolutionary Socialist Party				1
Total				20

=== Left Democratic Front ===
Left Democratic Front
Party	Flag	Symbol	Leader	Seats
Communist Party of India (Marxist)				10
Independent Politician (LDF Supported)				5
Communist Party of India				4
Janata Dal (Secular)				1
Total				20

=== National Democratic Alliance ===
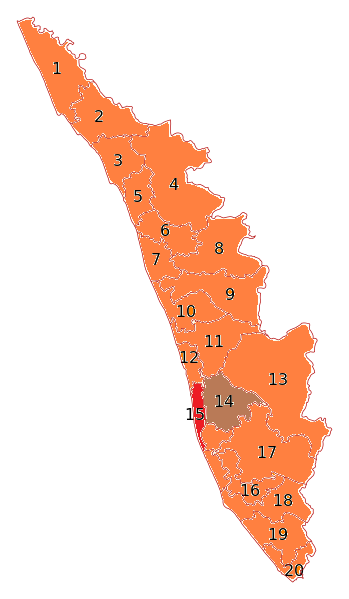
NDA seat sharing in Kerala

No.	Party	Election Symbol	Seats contested
1.	Bharatiya Janata Party		18
2.	Kerala Congress (Nationalist)		1
3.	Revolutionary Socialist Party of Kerala (Bolshevik)		1

=== Left United Front ===
The Left United Front was launched in March 2014, by the Revolutionary Marxist Party, the Socialist Unity Centre of India (Communist) and the Marxist Communist Party of India (United).

== Opinion Polls ==
Conducted in Month(s)	Ref	Polling Organisation/Agency	Sample size				
Conducted in Month(s)	Ref	Polling Organisation/Agency	Sample size	UDF	LDF	NDA	Others
Aug–Oct 2013		Outlook-CVoter	24,284	7	13	0	0
Jan–Feb 2014		Times Now-India TV-CVoter	14,000	10	9	1	0
Feb 2014		NDTV- Hansa Research	46,571	13	7	0	0
March 2014		NDTV- Hansa Research	46,571	9	11	0	0
March–April 2014		CNN-IBN-Lokniti-CSDS	607	11–17	4–8	0	0
April 2014		NDTV- Hansa Research	24,000	8	12	0	0

== Candidates ==
Constituency		UPA		Left Front		NDA	
#	Name	Party	Candidate	Party	Candidate	Party	Candidate
1	Kasaragod	INC	T. Siddique	CPM	P. Karunakaran	BJP	K. Surendran
2	Kannur	INC	K. Sudhakaran	CPM	P. K. Sreemathy	BJP	P. C. Mohanan
3	Vatakara	INC	M. Ramachandran	CPM	A. N. Shamseer	BJP	V. K. Sajeevan
4	Wayanad	INC	M. I. Shanavas	CPI	Sathyan Mokeri	BJP	P. R. Rasmilnath
5	Kozhikode	INC	M. K. Raghavan	CPM	A. Vijayaraghavan	BJP	C. K. Padmanabhan
6	Malappuram	IUML	E. Ahammed	CPM	P. K. Sainaba	BJP	N. Sreeprakash
7	Ponnani	IUML	E. T. Md. Basheer	IND	V. Abdurahiman (Note: LDF backed candidate contested as Independent.)	BJP	Narayanan
8	Palakkad	SJ(D)	M. P. Veerendrakumar	CPM	M. B. Rajesh	BJP	Sobha Surendran
9	Alathur	INC	Sheeba	CPM	P. K. Biju	BJP	Shajumon Vattekkattu
10	Thrissur	INC	K. P. Dhanapalan	CPI	C. N. Jayadevan	BJP	K. P. Sreesan
11	Chalakudy	INC	P. C. Chacko	IND	Innocent	BJP	B. Gopalakrishnan
12	Ernakulam	INC	K. V. Thomas	IND	Christy Fernandez	BJP	A. N. Radhakrishnan
13	Idukki	INC	Dean Kuriakose	IND	Joice George	BJP	Sabu Varghese
14	Kottayam	KC(M)	Jose K Mani	JD(S)	Mathew T. Thomas	KC(N)	Noble Mathew
15	Alappuzha	INC	K. C. Venugopal	CPM	C. B. Chandrababu	RSP(B)	A. V. Thamarakshan
16	Mavelikkara	INC	Kodikkunnil Suresh	CPI	Chengara Surendran	BJP	P. Sudheer
17	Pathanamthitta	INC	Anto Antony	IND	Peelipose Thomas	BJP	M. T. Ramesh
18	Kollam	RSP	N. K. Premachandran	CPM	M. A. Baby	BJP	P. M. Velayudhan
19	Attingal	INC	Bindu Krishna	CPM	Anirudhan Sampath	BJP	Girijakumari S
20	Thiruvananthapuram	INC	Shashi Tharoor	CPI	Bennet Abraham	BJP	O. Rajagopal

== Results ==
Vote Share (By alliance)
1. UDF (42.0%)
2. LDF (40.1%)
3. NDA (10.8%)
4. Others (7.08%)

Alliance/Party		Popular vote			Seats		
Alliance/Party		Votes	%	±pp	Contested	Won	+/−
UDF	INC	5,590,285	31.10%	▼9.04%	15	8	▼5
UDF	IUML	816,226	4.54%	▼0.54%	2	2	Steady
UDF	KC(M)	424,194	2.36%	▼0.17%	1	1	Steady
UDF	RSP	408,528	2.27%	New	1	1	▲1
UDF	SJ(D)	307,597	1.71%	New	1	0	New
UDF	Total	7,546,830	41.98 %	▼5.75%	20	12	▼4
LDF	CPI(M)	3,880,655	21.59%	▼8.89%	10	5	▲1
LDF	LDF Ind.	1,662,997	9.25%	▲4.24%	6	2	▲2
LDF	CPI	1,364,010	7.59%	▲0.15%	4	1	▲1
LDF	JD(S)	303,595	1.69%	▲1.69%	1	0	New
LDF	Total	7,211,257	40.12%	▼1.77%	20	8	▲5
NDA	BJP	1,856,750	10.33%	▲4.02%	18	0	Steady
NDA	KC(N)	44,357	0.25%	New	1	0	Steady
NDA	RSP(B)	43,051	0.24%	New	1	0	Steady
NDA	Total	1,944,158	10.82%	▲4.39%	20	0	Steady
Others		1,273,648	7.08%				
Total		17,975,893	100%	▲0.51%		20	

=== Results ===
UDF	LDF	NDA	Others
12	8	0	0

UDF				LDF
8	2	1	1	5	1	2
INC	IUML	KC(M)	RSP	CPI(M)	CPI	IND

=== Party-wise detailed results ===
Party-wise details of the 2014 Indian general election in Kerala
Party	Alliance	Abbr.	Candidates			Votes			Seats		
Party	Alliance	Abbr.	No.	+/-	%	Number	%	+/-	No.	+/-	%
Indian National Congress	UDF	INC	15		75%	5,590,285	31.10%		8	▼5	40%
Communist Party of India (Marxist)	LDF	CPI(M)	10		50%	3,880,655	21.59%		5	▲1	25%
CPI(M) Independents	LDF	IND	6		25%	1,662,997	9.25%		2	▲2	10%
Indian Union Muslim League	UDF	IUML	2	Steady	10%	816,226	4.54%		2	Steady	10%
Communist Party of India	LDF	CPI	4		20%	1,364,010	7.59%		1	▲1	5%
Kerala Congress	UDF	KEC(M)	1	Steady	5%	424,194	2.36%		1	Steady	5%
Revolutionary Socialist Party	UDF	RSP	1	Steady	5%	408,528	2.27%		1	▲1	5%
Bharatiya Janata Party	NDA	BJP	18		90%	1,856,750	10.33%		0	Steady	0.00%
Socialist Janata (Democratic)	UDF	SJD	1	New	5%	307,597	1.71%	New	0	New	0.00%
Janata Dal (Secular)	LDF	JD(S)	1		5%	303,595	1.69%		0	Steady	0.00%
Social Democratic Party of India		SDPI	20	New	100%	273,847	1.52%	New	0	New	0.00%
Aam Aadmi Party		AAP	15	New	75%	256,662	1.43%	New	0	New	0.00%
Bahujan Samaj Party		BSP	20		100%	71,362	0.40%		0		0.00%
Welfare Party of India		WPI	5	New	25%	68,332	0.38%	New	0	New	0.00%
Kerala Congress (Nationalist)	NDA	KEC(N)	1		5%	44,357	0.25%		0	New	0.00%
Revolutionary Socialist Party (Bolshevik)	NDA	RSP(B)	1		5%	43,051	0.24%		0		0.00%
Socialist Unity Centre of India (Communist)		SUCI(C)	5		25%	18,128	0.10%	New	0	New	0.00%
Communist Party of India (Marxist-Leninist) Red Star		CPI(ML)RS	8	New	40%	11,070	0.06%	New	0	New	0.00%
Shiv Sena		SHS	4		20%	10,181	0.06%		0	Steady	0.00%
Socialist Republican Party		SRP	2		10%	6,512	0.04%		0	Steady	0.00%
All India Trinamool Congress		AITC	5		25%	4,299	0.02%		0		0.00%
Janata Dal (United)		JD(U)	3		15%	3,865	0.02%		0	Steady	0.00%
Rashtriya Janata Dal		RJD	1		5%	1,376	0.01%		0	Steady	0.00%
Republican Party of India (A)		RPI(A)	2		10%	997	0.01%		0	Steady	0.00%
Social Action Party		SAP	1		5%	682	0.00%		0	Steady	0.00%
Indian Gandhiyan Party		IGP	1		5%	546	0.00%		0		0.00%
Republican Party of India		RPI	1		5%	292	0.00%		0	Steady	0.00%
Other Independents		IND	116			334,936	1.86%		0	Steady	0.00%
None of the above		NOTA				210,561	1.17%	New	0	New	0.00%
Valid Votes			289	▲72		17,975,893	100.00%	Steady	20	Steady	100.00%
Rejected Votes											
Total Polled											
Registered Electors											
Sources: Election Commission of India

=== Elected members ===
No.	Constituency	Turnout%	Elected M.P	Party	Margin
1	Kasaragod	78.41 ▲	P Karunakaran	Communist Party of India (Marxist)	6921
2	Kannur	81.06 ▲	P K Sreemathi Teacher	Communist Party of India (Marxist)	6566
3	Vatakara	81.21 ▲	Mullappally Ramachandran	Indian National Congress	3306
4	Wayanad	73.25 ▼	M I Shanavas	Indian National Congress	20870
5	Kozhikode	79.77 ▲	M .K Raghavan	Indian National Congress	16883
6	Malappuram	71.21 ▼	E. Ahamed	Indian Union Muslim League	194739
7	Ponnani	73.81 ▼	E. T. Mohammed Basheer	Indian Union Muslim League	25410
8	Palakkad	75.33 ▲	M B Rajesh	Communist Party of India (Marxist)	105300
9	Alathur	76.35 ▲	P.K.Biju	Communist Party of India (Marxist)	37312
10	Thrissur	72.19 ▲	C. N. Jayadevan	Communist Party of India	38227
11	Chalakudy	76.93 ▲	Innocent	Independent	13884
12	Ernakulam	73.58 ▲	Prof. K.V. Thomas	Indian National Congress	87047
13	Idukki	70.79 ▼	Adv.Joice George	Independent	50542
14	Kottayam	71.67 ▼	Jose K. Mani	Kerala Congress (M)	120599
15	Alappuzha	78.55 ▼	K C Venugopal	Indian National Congress	19407
16	Mavelikkara	70.99 ▲	Kodikunnil Suresh	Indian National Congress	32737
17	Pathanamthitta	65.81 ▲	Anto Antony	Indian National Congress	56191
18	Kollam	72.10 ▲	N.K.Premachandran	Revolutionary Socialist Party	37649
19	Attingal	68.67 ▲	Dr.A .Sampath	Communist Party of India (Marxist)	69378
20	Thiruvananthapuram	68.63 ▲	Dr. Shashi Tharoor	Indian National Congress	15,470

=== Constituency-wise detailed results ===
No.	Constituency	UDF candidate	Party	Votes	%	LDF candidate	Party	Votes	%	NDA candidate	Party	Votes	%	Other candidate	Votes	%	Party	Winning alliance	Margin
1	Kasaragod	T. Siddique	INC	3,78,043	38.8%	P. Karunakaran	CPI(M)	3,84,964	39.5%	K. Surendran	BJP	1,72,826	17.7%	Abdul Salam N. U.	9,713	1.0%	SDPI	Left Democratic Front	6,921
2	Kannur	K. Sudhakaran	INC	4,21,056	44.5%	P. K. Sreemathy	CPI(M)	4,27,622	45.1%	P C. Mohanan	BJP	51,636	5.5%	K. K. Abdul Jabbar	19,170	2.0%	SDPI	Left Democratic Front	6,566
3	Vatakara	Mullappally Ramachandran	INC	4,16,479	43.4%	A. N. Shamseer	CPI(M)	4,13,173	43.1%	V. K. Sajeevan	BJP	76,313	8.0%	P. Kumarankutty	17,229	1.8%	IND	United Democratic Front (Kerala)	3,306
4	Wayanad	M. I. Shanavas	INC	3,77,035	41.2%	Sathyan Mokeri	CPI	3,56,165	38.9%	P. R. Rasmilnath	BJP	80,752	8.8%	P. V. Anvar	37,123	4.1%	NCP	United Democratic Front (Kerala)	20,870
5	Kozhikode	M. K. Raghavan	INC	3,97,615	42.2%	A. Vijayaraghavan	CPI(M)	3,80,732	40.4%	C. K. Padmanabhan	BJP	1,15,760	12.3%	K. P. Ratheesh	13,934	1.5%	AAP	United Democratic Front (Kerala)	16,883
6	Malappuram	E. Ahammed	IUML	4,37,723	51.3%	P. K. Sainaba	CPI(M)	2,42,984	28.5%	N. Sreeprakash	BJP	64,705	7.6%	Nasarudheen	47,853	5.6%	SDPI	United Democratic Front (Kerala)	1,94,739
7	Ponnani	E. T. Muhammed Basheer	IUML	3,78,503	43.4%	V. Abdurahiman	IND	3,53,093	40.5%	Narayanan	BJP	75,212	8.6%	V. T. Ikramul Haque	26,640	3.1%	SDPI	United Democratic Front (Kerala)	25,410
8	Palakkad	M. P. Veerendrakumar	SJ(D)	3,07,597	33.8%	M. B. Rajesh	CPI(M)	4,12,897	45.4%	Sobha Surendran	BJP	1,36,587	15.0%	E. S. Khaja Hussain	12,504	1.4%	SDPI	Left Democratic Front	1,05,300
9	Alathur	Sheeba	INC	3,74,496	40.4%	P. K. Biju	CPI(M)	4,11,808	44.4%	Shajumon Vattekkattu	BJP	87,803	9.5%	Krishnan Eranhikkal	7,820	0.8%	SDPI	Left Democratic Front	37,312
10	Thrissur	K. P. Dhanapalan	INC	3,50,982	38.1%	C. N. Jayadevan	CPI	3,89,209	42.3%	K. P. Sreesan	BJP	1,02,681	11.2%	Sarah Joseph	44,638	4.8%	AAP	Left Democratic Front	38,227
11	Chalakudy	P. C. Chacko	INC	3,44,556	39.0%	Innocent	IND	3,58,440	40.5%	B. Gopalakrishnan	BJP	92,848	10.5%	K. M. Noordeen	35,189	4.0%	AAP	Left Democratic Front	13,884
12	Ernakulam	K. V. Thomas	INC	3,53,841	41.6%	Christy Fernandez	IND	2,66,794	31.4%	A. N. Radhakrishnan	BJP	99,003	11.6%	Anitha Pratap	51,517	6.1%	AAP	United Democratic Front (Kerala)	87,047
13	Idukki	Dean Kuriakose	INC	3,31,477	40.4%	Joice George	IND	3,82,019	46.6%	Sabu Varghese	BJP	50,438	6.2%	Silvi Sunil	11,215	1.4%	AAP	Left Democratic Front	50,542
14	Kottayam	Jose K Mani	KC(M)	4,24,194	51.0%	Mathew T. Thomas	JD(S)	3,03,595	36.5%	Noble Mathew	KC(N)	44,357	5.3%	Anil Aikkara	26,381	3.2%	AAP	United Democratic Front (Kerala)	1,20,599
15	Alappuzha	K. C. Venugopal	INC	4,62,525	46.4%	C B Chandrababu	CPI(M)	4,43,118	44.4%	A. V. Thamarakshan	RSP(B)	43,051	4.3%	Thulaseedharan Pallickal	10,993	1.1%	SDPI	United Democratic Front (Kerala)	19,407
16	Mavelikkara	Kodikkunnil Suresh	INC	4,02,432	45.3%	Chengara Surendran	CPI	3,69,695	41.6%	P. Sudheer	BJP	79,743	9.0%	Jyothish Perumpulickal	8,946	1.0%	SDPI	United Democratic Front (Kerala)	32,737
17	Pathanamthitta	Anto Antony Punnathaniyil	INC	3,58,842	41.3%	Peelipose Thomas	IND	3,02,651	34.8%	M. T. Ramesh	BJP	1,38,954	17.4%	Peelipose	16,493	1.9%	IND	United Democratic Front (Kerala)	56,191
18	Kollam	N.K. Premachandran	RSP	4,08,528	46.5%	M. A. Baby	CPI(M)	3,70,879	42.2%	P. M. Velayudhan	BJP	58,671	6.7%	A. K. Salahudeen	12,812	1.5%	SDPI	United Democratic Front (Kerala)	37,649
19	Attingal	Bindu Krishna	INC	3,23,100	37.6%	A. Sampath	CPI(M)	3,92,478	45.7%	Girijakumari S	BJP	90,528	11.2%	M. K. Manoj Kumar	11,225	1.3%	SDPI	Left Democratic Front	69,378
20	Thiruvananthapuram	Shashi Tharoor	INC	2,97,806	34.1%	Bennet Abraham	CPI	2,48,941	28.5%	O. Rajagopal	BJP	2,82,336	34.0%	Ajit Joy	14,153	1.6%	AAP	United Democratic Front (Kerala)	15,470

=== Assembly-Segment-wise detailed results by constituency ===
Based on the data from Chief Electoral Officer, Kerala

=== Results ===
Party	Assembly segments
Indian National Congress	57
Indian Union Muslim League	11
Kerala Congress (M)	7
Revolutionary Socialist Party	4
Socialist Janata (Democratic)	1
Communist Party of India (Marxist)	36
Communist Party of India	9
LDF- Independents	11
Bharatiya Janata Party	4
Others	–
Total	140

Alliance	assembly segments.
UDF	80
LDF	56
NDA	4
Total assembly lead out of 140.

=== Kasaragod ===
No.	Assembly	1st Position	Party	Votes	%	2nd Position	Party	Votes	%	3rd Position	Party	Votes	%	NOTA	Margin
1	Manjeshwar	T. Siddique	INC	52459	38.8%	K. Surendran	BJP	46631	34.5%	P. Karunakaran	CPI(M)	29433	21.8%	914	5828
2	Kasargod	T. Siddique	INC	54426	43.8%	K. Surendran	BJP	41236	33.2%	P. Karunakaran	CPI(M)	22827	18.4%	686	13190
3	Udma	T. Siddique	INC	56291	40.0%	P. Karunakaran	CPI(M)	55456	39.4%	K. Surendran	BJP	24584	17.5%	823	835
4	Kanhangad	P. Karunakaran	CPI(M)	64669	43.0%	T. Siddique	INC	56954	37.9%	K. Surendran	BJP	23578	15.7%	1084	7715
5	Trikaripur	P. Karunakaran	CPI(M)	65452	45.4%	T. Siddique	INC	62001	43.0%	K. Surendran	BJP	12990	9.0%	825	3451
6	Payyannur	P. Karunakaran	CPI(M)	75167	54.5%	T. Siddique	INC	47025	34.1%	K. Surendran	BJP	12878	9.3%	896	28142
7	Kalliasseri	P. Karunakaran	CPI(M)	71208	53.0%	T. Siddique	INC	48423	36.0%	K. Surendran	BJP	10758	8.0%	855	22782

=== Kannur ===
No.	Assembly	1st Position	Party	Votes	%	2nd Position	Party	Votes	%	3rd Position	Party	Votes	%	NOTA	Margin
8	Taliparamba	P. K. Sreemathi	CPI(M)	78922	51.0%	K. Sudhakaran	INC	64703	41.8%	P. C. Mohanan	BJP	6793	4.4%	1031	14219
9	Irikkur	K. Sudhakaran	INC	75083	54.6%	P. K. Sreemathi	CPI(M)	52928	38.5%	P. C. Mohanan	BJP	5234	3.8%	961	22155
10	Azhikode	K. Sudhakaran	INC	56288	45.6%	P. K. Sreemathi	CPI(M)	51278	41.5%	P. C. Mohanan	BJP	8780	7.1%	1181	5010
11	Kannur	K. Sudhakaran	INC	55173	47.7%	P. K. Sreemathi	CPI(M)	47116	40.7%	P. C. Mohanan	BJP	6829	5.9%	1032	8057
12	Dharmadam	P. K. Sreemathi	CPI(M)	72158	50.8%	K. Sudhakaran	INC	57197	40.3%	P. C. Mohanan	BJP	6916	4.9%	1030	14961
13	Mattannur	P. K. Sreemathi	CPI(M)	74399	52.1%	K. Sudhakaran	INC	53666	37.6%	P. C. Mohanan	BJP	9695	6.8%	743	20733
14	Peravoor	K. Sudhakaran	INC	57886	47.7%	P. K. Sreemathi	CPI(M)	49677	41.0%	P. C. Mohanan	BJP	7265	6.0%	1031	8209

=== Vadakara ===
No.	Assembly	1st Position	Party	Votes	%	2nd Position	Party	Votes	%	3rd Position	Party	Votes	%	NOTA	Margin
15	Thalasserry	A. N. Shamseer	CPI(M)	64404	52.2%	Mullappally Ramachandran	INC	41365	33.5%	V. K. Sajeevan	BJP	11780	9.5%	824	23039
16	Kuthuparamba	A. N. Shamseer	CPI(M)	59486	44.3%	Mullappally Ramachandran	INC	54761	40.8%	V. K. Sajeevan	BJP	14774	11.0%	739	4725
17	Vadakara	Mullappally Ramachandran	INC	57656	47.6%	A. N. Shamseer	CPI(M)	42315	34.9%	V. K. Sajeevan	BJP	9061	7.5%	737	15341
18	Kuttiadi	Mullappally Ramachandran	INC	68177	47.4%	A. N. Shamseer	CPI(M)	61912	43.0%	V. K. Sajeevan	BJP	8087	5.6%	707	6265
19	Nadapuram	Mullappally Ramachandran	INC	68103	45.2%	A. N. Shamseer	CPI(M)	66356	44.0%	V. K. Sajeevan	BJP	9107	6.0%	847	1747
20	Quilandy	Mullappally Ramachandran	INC	62371	45.3%	A. N. Shamseer	CPI(M)	55745	40.5%	V. K. Sajeevan	BJP	14093	10.2%	1215	6626
21	Perambra	Mullappally Ramachandran	INC	63012	45.0%	A. N. Shamseer	CPI(M)	61837	44.2%	V. K. Sajeevan	BJP	9325	6.7%	1024	1175

=== Wayanad ===
No.	Assembly	1st Position	Party	Votes	%	2nd Position	Party	Votes	%	3rd Position	Party	Votes	%	NOTA	Margin
22	Mananthavady	Sathyan Mokeri	CPI	56285	44.7%	M. I. Shanavas	INC	47619	37.8%	P. S. Rasmilnath	BJP	12950	10.3%	1675	8666
23	Sulthanbathery	Sathyan Mokeri	CPI	63165	43.5%	M. I. Shanavas	INC	54182	37.3%	P. S. Rasmilnath	BJP	18918	13.0%	2081	8983
24	Kalpetta	M. I. Shanavas	INC	53383	41.7%	Sathyan Mokeri	CPI	51503	40.2%	P. S. Rasmilnath	BJP	12824	10.0%	1369	1880
25	Thiruvambady	M. I. Shanavas	INC	49349	43.2%	Sathyan Mokeri	CPI	46964	41.2%	P. S. Rasmilnath	BJP	6153	5.4%	1590	2385
26	Eranad	M. I. Shanavas	INC	56566	48.6%	Sathyan Mokeri	CPI	37728	32.4%	P. S. Rasmilnath	BJP	6163	5.3%	1123	18838
27	Nilambur	M. I. Shanavas	INC	55403	40.9%	Sathyan Mokeri	CPI	52137	38.5%	P. S. Rasmilnath	BJP	13120	9.7%	1471	3266
28	Wandoor	M. I. Shanavas	INC	60249	43.6%	Sathyan Mokeri	CPI	47982	34.7%	P. S. Rasmilnath	BJP	10571	7.6%	1420	12267

=== Kozhikode ===
No.	Assembly	1st Position	Party	Votes	%	2nd Position	Party	Votes	%	3rd Position	Party	Votes	%	NOTA	Margin
29	Balusseri	M. K. Raghavan	INC	69414	43.6%	A. Vijayaraghavan	CPI(M)	68747	43.2%	C. K. Padmanabhan	BJP	15332	9.6%	1000	667
30	Elathur	A. Vijayaraghavan	CPI(M)	63241	44.0%	M. K. Raghavan	INC	57792	40.2%	C. K. Padmanabhan	BJP	17392	12.1%	786	5449
31	Kozhikode North	M. K. Raghavan	INC	47899	40.2%	A. Vijayaraghavan	CPI(M)	46380	38.9%	C. K. Padmanabhan	BJP	19918	16.7%	1085	1519
32	Kozhikode South	M. K. Raghavan	INC	45128	43.2%	A. Vijayaraghavan	CPI(M)	39912	38.2%	C. K. Padmanabhan	BJP	14155	13.5%	885	5216
33	Beypore	A. Vijayaraghavan	CPI(M)	54896	41.1%	M. K. Raghavan	INC	53128	39.8%	C. K. Padmanabhan	BJP	18031	13.5%	868	1768
34	Kunnamangalam	A. Vijayaraghavan	CPI(M)	64584	41.0%	M. K. Raghavan	INC	64364	40.9%	C. K. Padmanabhan	BJP	21726	13.8%	1063	220
35	Koduvally	M. K. Raghavan	INC	58494	50.1%	A. Vijayaraghavan	CPI(M)	41895	35.9%	C. K. Padmanabhan	BJP	9041	7.7%	692	16599

=== Malappuram ===
No.	Assembly	1st Position	Party	Votes	%	2nd Position	Party	Votes	%	3rd Position	Party	Votes	%	NOTA	Margin
36	Kondotty	E. Ahammed	IUML	65846	53.3%	P. K. Sainaba	CPI(M)	34129	27.6%	N. Sreeprakash	BJP	10960	8.9%	3141	31717
37	Manjeri	E. Ahammed	IUML	64677	51.7%	P. K. Sainaba	CPI(M)	38615	30.8%	N. Sreeprakash	BJP	10656	8.5%	3168	26062
38	Perinthalmanna	E. Ahammed	IUML	59210	47.5%	P. K. Sainaba	CPI(M)	48596	39.0%	N. Sreeprakash	BJP	7356	5.9%	2948	10614
39	Mankada	E. Ahammed	IUML	59738	50.1%	P. K. Sainaba	CPI(M)	36277	30.5%	N. Sreeprakash	BJP	8279	6.9%	2596	23461
40	Malappuram	E. Ahammed	IUML	72304	56.7%	P. K. Sainaba	CPI(M)	35980	28.2%	Nasarudheen	SDPI	6946	5.4%	3619	36324
41	Vengara	E. Ahammed	IUML	60323	62.1%	P. K. Sainaba	CPI(M)	17691	18.2%	Nasarudheen	SDPI	9058	9.3%	3270	42632
42	Vallikunnu	E. Ahammed	IUML	55422	48.6%	P. K. Sainaba	CPI(M)	31487	27.6%	N. Sreeprakash	BJP	15982	14.0%	3080	23935

=== Ponnani ===
No.	Assembly	1st Position	Party	Votes	%	2nd Position	Party	Votes	%	3rd Position	Party	Votes	%	NOTA	Margin
43	Tirurangadi	E. T. Mohammed Basheer	IUML	61073	53.1%	V. Abdurahman	LDF-IND	37706	32.8%	K. Narayanan	BJP	7530	6.5%	975	23367
44	Tanur	E. T. Mohammed Basheer	IUML	51365	45.3%	V. Abdurahman	LDF-IND	45145	39.8%	K. Narayanan	BJP	10141	8.9%	732	6220
45	Tirur	E. T. Mohammed Basheer	IUML	63711	46.9%	V. Abdurahman	LDF-IND	56466	41.6%	K. Narayanan	BJP	6860	5.0%	1070	7245
46	Kottakkal	E. T. Mohammed Basheer	IUML	62791	47.8%	V. Abdurahman	LDF-IND	50910	38.8%	K. Narayanan	BJP	8931	6.8%	1233	11881
47	Thavanur	V. Abdurahman	LDF-IND	56209	45.2%	E. T. Mohammed Basheer	IUML	47039	37.9%	K. Narayanan	BJP	13921	11.2%	1003	9170
48	Ponnani	V. Abdurahman	LDF-IND	52600	43.8%	E. T. Mohammed Basheer	IUML	44942	37.5%	K. Narayanan	BJP	12163	10.1%	1062	7658
49	Thrithala	V. Abdurahman	LDF-IND	53921	43.5%	E. T. Mohammed Basheer	IUML	47488	38.3%	K. Narayanan	BJP	15640	12.6%	1418	6433

=== Palakkad ===
No.	Assembly	1st Position	Party	Votes	%	2nd Position	Party	Votes	%	3rd Position	Party	Votes	%	NOTA	Margin
50	Pattambi	M. B. Rajesh	CPI(M)	53821	42.9%	M. P. Veerendrakumar	SJD	47231	37.6%	Sobha Surendran	BJP	15102	12.0%	993	6590
51	Shornur	M. B. Rajesh	CPI(M)	64559	50.0%	M. P. Veerendrakumar	SJD	39180	30.3%	Sobha Surendran	BJP	19586	15.2%	1301	25379
52	Ottapalam	M. B. Rajesh	CPI(M)	65945	47.5%	M. P. Veerendrakumar	SJD	46366	33.4%	Sobha Surendran	BJP	20564	14.8%	1544	19579
53	Kongad	M. B. Rajesh	CPI(M)	56160	46.7%	M. P. Veerendrakumar	SJD	41799	34.8%	Sobha Surendran	BJP	17598	14.6%	1595	14361
54	Mannarkad	M. P. Veerendrakumar	SJD	54553	42.2%	M. B. Rajesh	CPI(M)	54265	42.0%	Sobha Surendran	BJP	14271	11.0%	1541	288
55	Malampuzha	M. B. Rajesh	CPI(M)	71816	51.2%	M. P. Veerendrakumar	SJD	40466	28.8%	Sobha Surendran	BJP	23433	16.7%	2791	31350
56	Palakkad	M. B. Rajesh	CPI(M)	45861	40.0%	M. P. Veerendrakumar	SJD	37692	32.9%	Sobha Surendran	BJP	25892	22.6%	1524	8169

=== Alathur ===
No.	Assembly	1st Position	Party	Votes	%	2nd Position	Party	Votes	%	3rd Position	Party	Votes	%	NOTA	Margin
57	Tarur	P. K. Biju	CPI(M)	54510	46.6%	Sheeba	INC	49563	42.4%	Shajumon Vattekad	BJP	9226	7.9%	1524	4947
58	Chittur	P. K. Biju	CPI(M)	59155	45.9%	Sheeba	INC	52658	40.9%	Shajumon Vattekad	BJP	11585	9.0%	10606	6497
59	Nenmara	P. K. Biju	CPI(M)	59802	44.0%	Sheeba	INC	54887	40.3%	Shajumon Vattekad	BJP	15602	11.5%	1802	4915
60	Alathur	P. K. Biju	CPI(M)	58613	49.0%	Sheeba	INC	48092	40.2%	Shajumon Vattekad	BJP	9134	7.6%	1753	10521
61	Chelakkara	P. K. Biju	CPI(M)	58759	44.2%	Sheeba	INC	54801	41.2%	Shajumon Vattekad	BJP	14564	11.0%	1569	3958
62	Kunnamkulam	P. K. Biju	CPI(M)	58079	44.1%	Sheeba	INC	54262	41.2%	Shajumon Vattekad	BJP	14559	11.0%	1697	3817
63	Wadakkancherry	P. K. Biju	CPI(M)	62392	45.0%	Sheeba	INC	59729	43.1%	Shajumon Vattekad	BJP	13082	9.4%	2447	2663

=== Thrissur ===
No.	Assembly	1st Position	Party	Votes	%	2nd Position	Party	Votes	%	3rd Position	Party	Votes	%	NOTA	Margin
64	Guruvayoor	C. N. Jayadevan	CPI	53316	42.2%	K. P. Dhanapalan	INC	49465	39.1%	K. P. Sreesan	BJP	13936	11.0%	947	3851
65	Manalur	C. N. Jayadevan	CPI	60735	43.0%	K. P. Dhanapalan	INC	53807	38.1%	K. P. Sreesan	BJP	16548	11.7%	1325	6928
66	Ollur	C. N. Jayadevan	CPI	55778	41.9%	K. P. Dhanapalan	INC	54436	40.9%	K. P. Sreesan	BJP	12889	9.7%	1453	1342
67	Thrissur	K. P. Dhanapalan	INC	47171	42.5%	C. N. Jayadevan	CPI	40318	36.4%	K. P. Sreesan	BJP	12166	11.0%	1999	6853
68	Nattika	C. N. Jayadevan	CPI	60013	45.1%	K. P. Dhanapalan	INC	46048	34.6%	K. P. Sreesan	BJP	16785	12.6%	1380	13965
69	Irinjalakuda	C. N. Jayadevan	CPI	56314	43.4%	K. P. Dhanapalan	INC	51313	39.6%	K. P. Sreesan	BJP	14048	10.8%	1391	5001
70	Puthukkad	C. N. Jayadevan	CPI	62300	46.1%	K. P. Dhanapalan	INC	48353	35.8%	K. P. Sreesan	BJP	16253	12.0%	1546	13947

=== Chalakkudy ===
No.	Assembly	1st Position	Party	Votes	%	2nd Position	Party	Votes	%	3rd Position	Party	Votes	%	NOTA	Margin
71	Kaipamangalam	Innocent	LDF-IND	49833	42.8%	P. C. Chacko	INC	36575	31.4%	B. Gopalakrishnan	BJP	16434	14.1%	793	13258
72	Chalakkudy	P. C. Chacko	INC	55279	42.4%	Innocent	LDF-IND	54662	41.9%	B. Gopalakrishnan	BJP	13285	10.2%	1362	617
73	Kodungallur	Innocent	LDF-IND	51823	40.6%	P. C. Chacko	INC	47850	37.5%	B. Gopalakrishnan	BJP	18101	14.2%	1751	3973
74	Perumbavoor	Innocent	LDF-IND	51036	41.4%	P. C. Chacko	INC	48229	39.1%	B. Gopalakrishnan	BJP	12985	10.5%	1721	2807
75	Angamaly	P. C. Chacko	INC	55431	46.3%	Innocent	LDF-IND	49509	41.3%	B. Gopalakrishnan	BJP	8009	6.7%	1644	5922
76	Aluva	P. C. Chacko	INC	49725	39.4%	Innocent	LDF-IND	47639	37.7%	B. Gopalakrishnan	BJP	13584	10.8%	1627	2086
77	Kunnathunad	Innocent	LDF-IND	53518	41.6%	P. C. Chacko	INC	51133	39.7%	B. Gopalakrishnan	BJP	10395	8.1%	1648	2385

=== Ernakulam ===
No.	Assembly	1st Position	Party	Votes	%	2nd Position	Party	Votes	%	3rd Position	Party	Votes	%	NOTA	Margin
78	Kalamassery	K. V. Thomas	INC	51037	39.1%	Christy Fernandez	LDF-IND	42379	32.4%	A. N. Radhakrishnan	BJP	17558	13.4%	1278	8658
79	Paravur	K. V. Thomas	INC	55471	40.0%	Christy Fernandez	LDF-IND	47706	34.4%	A. N. Radhakrishnan	BJP	15917	11.5%	1414	7765
80	Vypen	K. V. Thomas	INC	49165	42.6%	Christy Fernandez	LDF-IND	39548	34.2%	A. N. Radhakrishnan	BJP	9324	8.1%	1148	9617
81	Kochi	K. V. Thomas	INC	50548	46.3%	Christy Fernandez	LDF-IND	30186	27.7%	A. N. Radhakrishnan	BJP	9984	9.2%	1038	20362
82	Thrippunithura	K. V. Thomas	INC	51605	39.5%	Christy Fernandez	LDF-IND	45034	34.5%	A. N. Radhakrishnan	BJP	16676	12.8%	1598	6571
83	Ernakulam	K. V. Thomas	INC	43516	44.8%	Christy Fernandez	LDF-IND	26623	27.4%	A. N. Radhakrishnan	BJP	14375	14.8%	1425	16893
84	Thrikkakara	K. V. Thomas	INC	52210	44.0%	Christy Fernandez	LDF-IND	34896	29.4%	A. N. Radhakrishnan	BJP	15099	12.7%	1825	17314

=== Idukki ===
No.	Assembly	1st Position	Party	Votes	%	2nd Position	Party	Votes	%	3rd Position	Party	Votes	%	NOTA	Margin
85	Muvattupuzha	Dean Kuriakose	INC	52414	45.0%	Joice George	LDF-IND	46842	40.2%	Sabu Varghese	BJP	8137	7.0%	1682	5572
86	Kothamangalam	Dean Kuriakose	INC	47578	44.2%	Joice George	LDF-IND	45102	41.9%	Sabu Varghese	BJP	7349	6.8%	1971	2476
87	Devikulam	Joice George	LDF-IND	53647	49.6%	Dean Kuriakose	INC	44526	41.1%	Sabu Varghese	BJP	5592	5.2%	1736	9121
88	Udumbanchola	Joice George	LDF-IND	62363	55.2%	Dean Kuriakose	INC	39671	35.1%	Sabu Varghese	BJP	5896	5.2%	1535	22692
89	Thodupuzha	Dean Kuriakose	INC	54321	43.1%	Joice George	LDF-IND	51233	40.6%	Sabu Varghese	BJP	12332	9.8%	2094	3088
90	Idukki	Joice George	LDF-IND	68100	56.1%	Dean Kuriakose	INC	43873	36.1%	Sabu Varghese	BJP	4752	3.9%	1580	24227
91	Peerumade	Joice George	LDF-IND	54351	47.9%	Dean Kuriakose	INC	48372	42.6%	Sabu Varghese	BJP	6347	5.6%	1727	5979

=== Kottayam ===
No.	Assembly	1st Position	Party	Votes	%	2nd Position	Party	Votes	%	3rd Position	Party	Votes	%	NOTA	Margin
92	Piravom	Jose K. Mani	KC(M)	63942	48.0%	Mathew T. Thomas	JD(S)	55611	41.8%	Anil Aikkara	AAP	5954	4.5%	3618	8331
93	Pala	Jose K. Mani	KC(M)	66968	57.5%	Mathew T. Thomas	JD(S)	35569	30.5%	Noble Mathew	KC(N)	8533	7.3%	2220	31399
94	Kaduthuruthy	Jose K. Mani	KC(M)	63554	55.1%	Mathew T. Thomas	JD(S)	38594	33.5%	Noble Mathew	KC(N)	6218	5.4%	1869	24960
95	Vaikom	Jose K. Mani	KC(M)	54623	46.1%	Mathew T. Thomas	JD(S)	52550	44.3%	Noble Mathew	KC(N)	5184	4.4%	1632	2073
96	Ettumanoor	Jose K. Mani	KC(M)	56429	50.5%	Mathew T. Thomas	JD(S)	43921	39.3%	Noble Mathew	KC(N)	5540	5.0%	1567	12508
97	Kottayam	Jose K. Mani	KC(M)	56395	51.6%	Mathew T. Thomas	JD(S)	39943	36.6%	Noble Mathew	KC(N)	6783	6.2%	1444	16452
98	Puthupally	Jose K. Mani	KC(M)	61552	55.1%	Mathew T. Thomas	JD(S)	36793	33.0%	Noble Mathew	KC(N)	7372	6.6%	1661	24759

=== Alappuzha ===
No.	Assembly	1st Position	Party	Votes	%	2nd Position	Party	Votes	%	3rd Position	Party	Votes	%	NOTA	Margin
99	Aroor	K. C. Venugopal	INC	66584	46.0%	C. B. Chandrababu	CPI(M)	65621	45.3%	A.V. Thamarakshan	RSP(B)	6907	4.8%	1946	963
100	Cherthala	K. C. Venugopal	INC	76747	47.2%	C. B. Chandrababu	CPI(M)	75398	46.3%	A.V. Thamarakshan	RSP(B)	6149	3.8%	2034	1349
101	Alappuzha	K. C. Venugopal	INC	70206	49.6%	C. B. Chandrababu	CPI(M)	62507	44.1%	A.V. Thamarakshan	RSP(B)	3827	2.7%	1796	7699
102	Ambalappuzha	K. C. Venugopal	INC	54553	46.2%	C. B. Chandrababu	CPI(M)	51316	43.4%	A.V. Thamarakshan	RSP(B)	5454	4.6%	1527	3237
103	Haripad	K. C. Venugopal	INC	66687	50.1%	C. B. Chandrababu	CPI(M)	57822	43.5%	A.V. Thamarakshan	RSP(B)	4794	3.6%	1361	8865
104	Kayamkulam	C. B. Chandrababu	CPI(M)	65948	47.2%	K. C. Venugopal	INC	62662	44.9%	A.V. Thamarakshan	RSP(B)	6442	4.6%	1351	3286
105	Karunagappally	K. C. Venugopal	INC	63662	44.5%	C. B. Chandrababu	CPI(M)	62959	44.0%	A.V. Thamarakshan	RSP(B)	9433	6.6%	1306	703

=== Mavelikkara ===
No.	Assembly	1st Position	Party	Votes	%	2nd Position	Party	Votes	%	3rd Position	Party	Votes	%	NOTA	Margin
106	Changanassery	Kodikkunnil Suresh	INC	52020	48.6%	Chengara Surendran	CPI	41624	38.8%	P. Sudheer	BJP	9239	8.6%	1558	10396
107	Kuttanad	Kodikkunnil Suresh	INC	51703	45.6%	Chengara Surendran	CPI	50508	44.5%	P. Sudheer	BJP	8739	7.7%	1298	1195
108	Mavelikara	Chengara Surendran	CPI	61350	46.0%	Kodikkunnil Suresh	INC	54883	41.2%	P. Sudheer	BJP	13067	9.8%	1321	6467
109	Chengannur	Kodikkunnil Suresh	INC	55769	45.5%	Chengara Surendran	CPI	47951	39.1%	P. Sudheer	BJP	15716	12.8%	1270	7818
110	Kunnathur	Kodikkunnil Suresh	INC	63686	43.6%	Chengara Surendran	CPI	63599	43.6%	P. Sudheer	BJP	11902	8.2%	1246	87
111	Kottarakkara	Kodikkunnil Suresh	INC	61444	46.1%	Chengara Surendran	CPI	56799	42.6%	P. Sudheer	BJP	11785	8.8%	1502	4645
112	Pathanapuram	Kodikkunnil Suresh	INC	61980	50.7%	Chengara Surendran	CPI	47061	38.5%	P. Sudheer	BJP	9218	7.5%	1253	14919

=== Pathanamthitta ===
No.	Assembly	1st Position	Party	Votes	%	2nd Position	Party	Votes	%	3rd Position	Party	Votes	%	NOTA	Margin
113	Kanjirappally	Anto Antony	INC	45593	41.0%	Peelipose Thomas	LDF-IND	35867	32.3%	M. T. Ramesh	BJP	20840	18.7%	2692	9726
114	Poonjar	Anto Antony	INC	43614	39.8%	Peelipose Thomas	LDF-IND	40853	37.3%	M. T. Ramesh	BJP	15099	13.8%	2803	2761
115	Thiruvalla	Anto Antony	INC	55701	45.3%	Peelipose Thomas	LDF-IND	42420	34.5%	M. T. Ramesh	BJP	19526	15.9%	2253	13281
116	Ranni	Anto Antony	INC	48909	43.0%	Peelipose Thomas	LDF-IND	39818	35.0%	M. T. Ramesh	BJP	18531	16.3%	2051	9091
117	Aranmula	Anto Antony	INC	58826	43.3%	Peelipose Thomas	LDF-IND	47477	34.9%	M. T. Ramesh	BJP	23771	17.5%	2211	11349
118	Konni	Anto Antony	INC	53480	42.9%	Peelipose Thomas	LDF-IND	45384	36.4%	M. T. Ramesh	BJP	18222	14.6%	2120	8096
119	Adoor	Anto Antony	INC	52312	39.1%	Peelipose Thomas	LDF-IND	50354	37.7%	M. T. Ramesh	BJP	22796	17.0%	2398	1958

=== Kollam ===
No.	Assembly	1st Position	Party	Votes	%	2nd Position	Party	Votes	%	3rd Position	Party	Votes	%	NOTA	Margin
120	Chavara	N. K. Premachandran	RSP	68878	55.4%	M. A. Baby	CPI(M)	44437	35.8%	P. M. Velayudhan	BJP	6739	5.4%	1032	24441
121	Punalur	M. A. Baby	CPI(M)	63227	46.5%	N. K. Premachandran	RSP	58587	43.1%	P. M. Velayudhan	BJP	8961	6.6%	1177	4640
122	Chadayamangalam	M. A. Baby	CPI(M)	59567	46.1%	N. K. Premachandran	RSP	52761	40.9%	P. M. Velayudhan	BJP	9473	7.3%	1182	6806
123	Kundara	N. K. Premachandran	RSP	64351	47.5%	M. A. Baby	CPI(M)	57440	42.4%	P. M. Velayudhan	BJP	8724	6.4%	1063	6911
124	Kollam	N. K. Premachandran	RSP	59685	50.8%	M. A. Baby	CPI(M)	45443	38.7%	P. M. Velayudhan	BJP	8322	7.1%	1184	14242
125	Eravipuram	N. K. Premachandran	RSP	52500	48.0%	M. A. Baby	CPI(M)	45936	42.0%	P. M. Velayudhan	BJP	6864	6.3%	1077	6564
126	Chathannoor	M. A. Baby	CPI(M)	53293	45.7%	N. K. Premachandran	RSP	50259	43.1%	P. M. Velayudhan	BJP	9522	8.2%	1146	3034

=== Attingal ===
No.	Assembly	1st Position	Party	Votes	%	2nd Position	Party	Votes	%	3rd Position	Party	Votes	%	NOTA	Margin
127	Varkala	A. Sampath	CPI(M)	50382	46.2%	Bindhu Krishna	INC	41369	37.9%	Girija Kumari S	BJP	10219	9.4%	808	9013
128	Attingal	A. Sampath	CPI(M)	64215	50.7%	Bindhu Krishna	INC	43260	34.1%	Girija Kumari S	BJP	11587	9.1%	1163	20955
129	Chirayinkeezhu	A. Sampath	CPI(M)	59186	48.0%	Bindhu Krishna	INC	47704	38.7%	Girija Kumari S	BJP	8377	6.8%	950	11482
130	Nedumangad	A. Sampath	CPI(M)	59283	46.6%	Bindhu Krishna	INC	45769	36.0%	Girija Kumari S	BJP	15304	12.0%	1100	13514
131	Vamanapuram	A. Sampath	CPI(M)	56922	45.0%	Bindhu Krishna	INC	51226	40.5%	Girija Kumari S	BJP	11207	8.9%	989	5696
132	Aruvikkara	A. Sampath	CPI(M)	52000	43.3%	Bindhu Krishna	INC	47837	39.9%	Girija Kumari S	BJP	14890	12.4%	860	4163
133	Kattakkada	A. Sampath	CPI(M)	49358	42.3%	Bindhu Krishna	INC	44375	38.0%	Girija Kumari S	BJP	18811	16.1%	1048	4983

=== Thiruvananthapuram ===
No.	Assembly	1st Position	Party	Votes	%	2nd Position	Party	Votes	%	3rd Position	Party	Votes	%	NOTA	Margin
134	Kazhakoottam	O. Rajagopal	BJP	41829	37.1%	Shashi Tharoor	INC	34220	30.4%	Bennet Abraham	CPI	31799	28.2%	483	7609
135	Vattiyoorkavu	O. Rajagopal	BJP	43589	37.1%	Shashi Tharoor	INC	40663	34.6%	Bennet Abraham	CPI	27504	23.4%	716	2926
136	Thiruvananthapuram	O. Rajagopal	BJP	40835	36.0%	Shashi Tharoor	INC	39027	34.4%	Bennet Abraham	CPI	27385	24.1%	578	1808
137	Nemom	O. Rajagopal	BJP	50685	42.1%	Shashi Tharoor	INC	32639	27.1%	Bennet Abraham	CPI	31643	26.3%	523	18046
138	Parassala	Shashi Tharoor	INC	50360	34.8%	Bennet Abraham	CPI	47953	33.2%	O. Rajagopal	BJP	39753	27.5%	357	2407
139	Kovalam	Shashi Tharoor	INC	51401	37.7%	Bennet Abraham	CPI	42112	30.9%	O. Rajagopal	BJP	36169	26.5%	347	9289
140	Neyyattinkara	Shashi Tharoor	INC	48009	39.3%	Bennet Abraham	CPI	39806	32.6%	O. Rajagopal	BJP	28958	23.7%	336	8203

== Assembly segments wise lead of Parties ==
Party		Assembly segments
UDF	INC	57
UDF	IUML	11
UDF	KC(M)	7
UDF	RSP	4
UDF	SJ(D)	1
UDF	Total	80
LDF	CPI(M)	36
LDF	CPI	9
LDF	Independent	11
LDF	Total	56
NDA	BJP	4
NDA	Total	4
Total		140

== See also ==
- Elections in Kerala
- Politics of Kerala
