= 2009 Indian general election in Kerala =

2009 Indian general election
- April–May 2009

20 seats
- Turnout: 73.38%
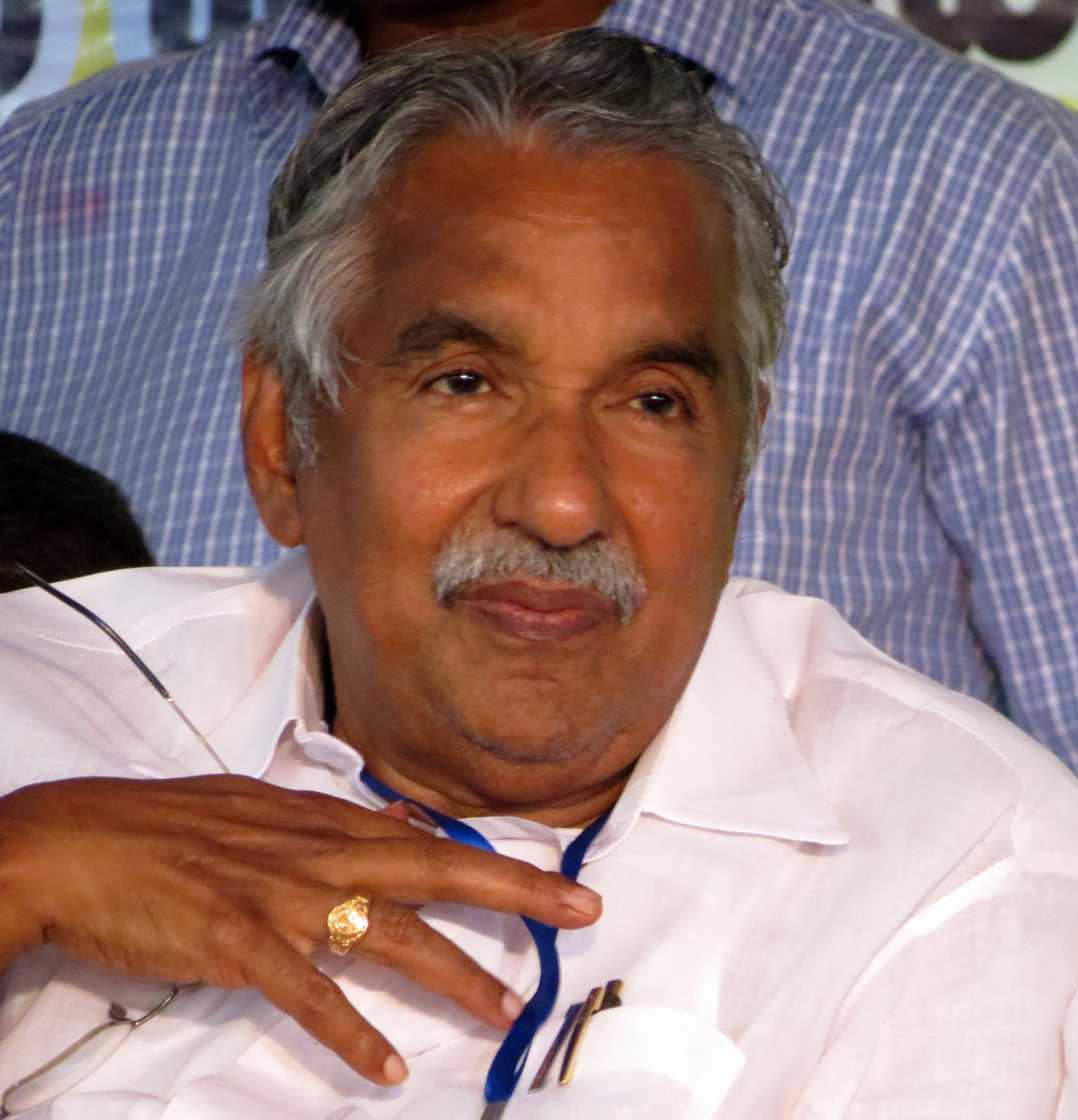

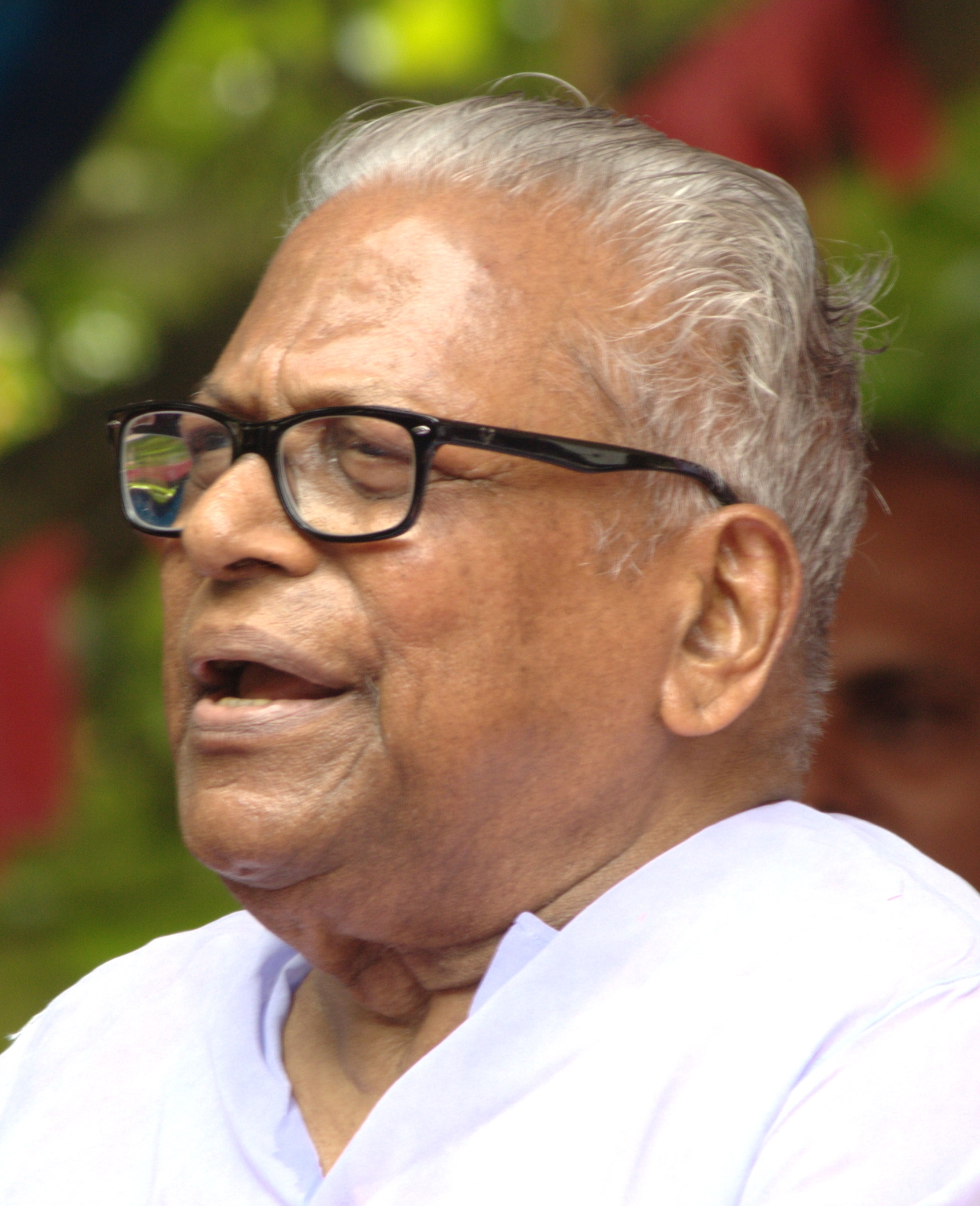

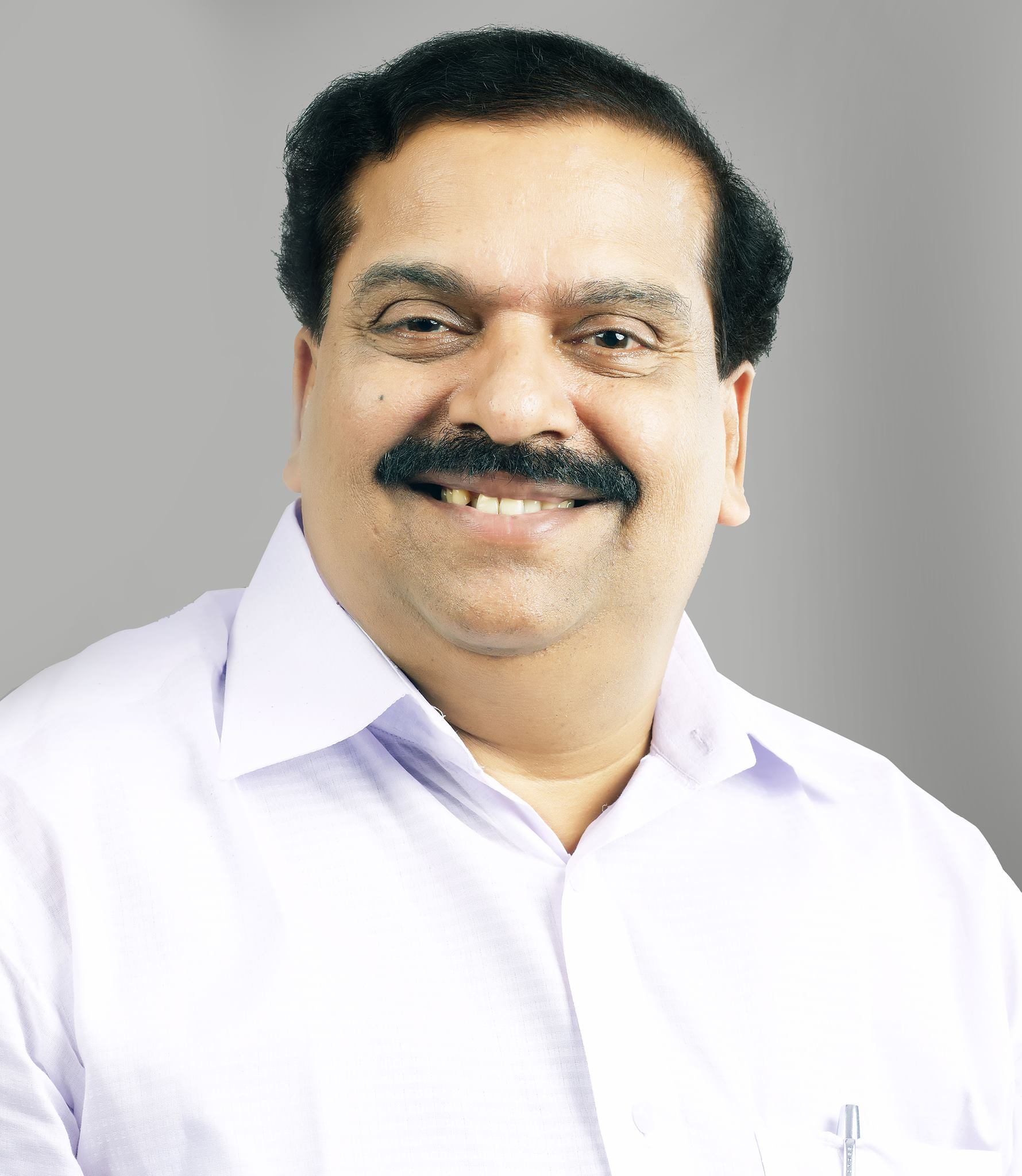
	First party	Second party	Third party
Leader	Oommen Chandy	V. S. Achuthanandan	P.K Krishnadas
Party	INC	CPI(M)	Bharatiya Janata Party
Alliance	UDF	LDF	NDA
Leader's seat	-	-	-
Last election	1	18	0
Seats won	16	4	0
Seat change	▲15	▼14	0
Percentage	47.73%	41.89%	6.31%
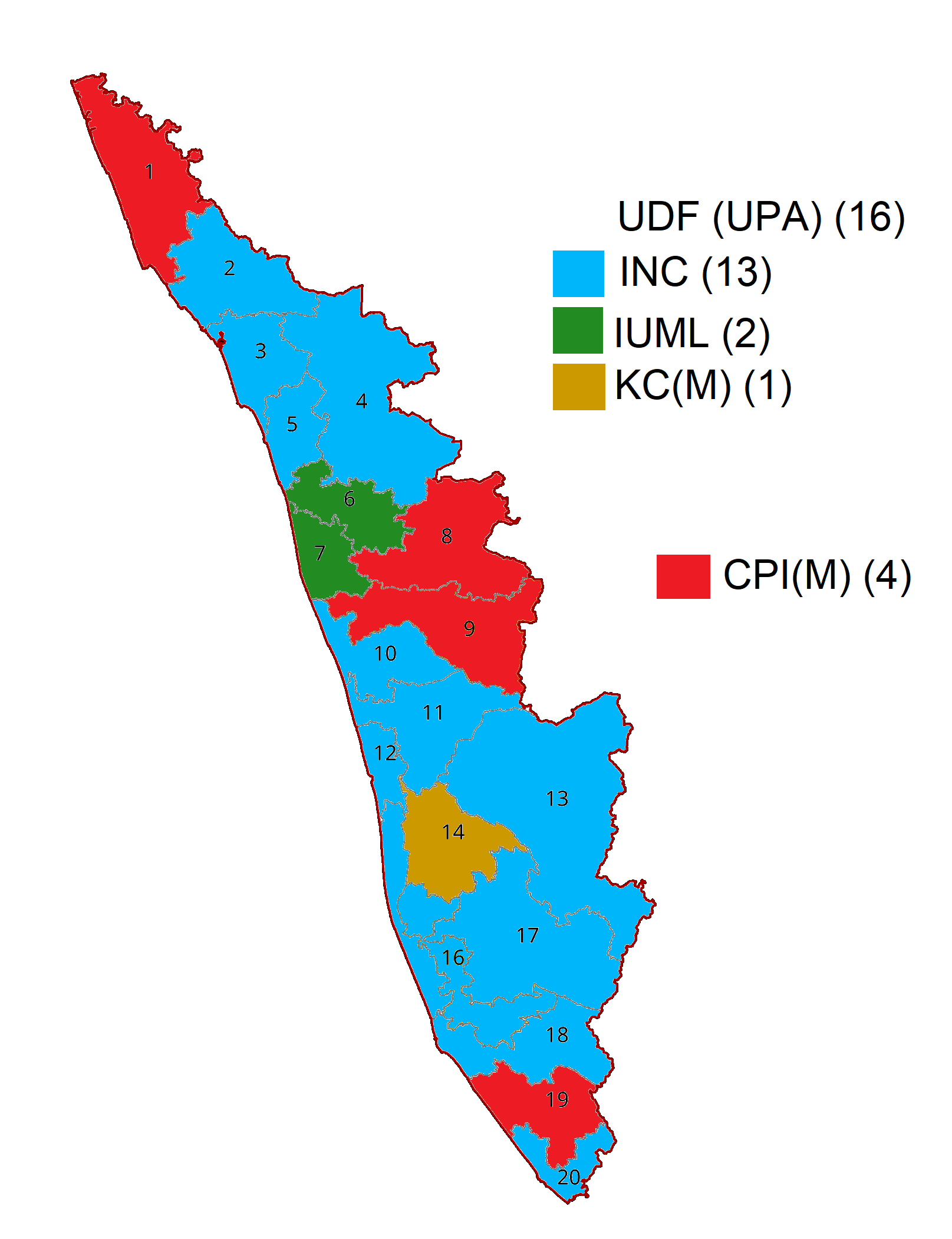
- Kerala
Prime Minister before election
Manmohan Singh
INC
Prime Minister after election
Manmohan Singh
INC

The 2009 Indian general election polls in Kerala were held for 20 seats in the state.

This is the first polls that took place in Kerala after implementation of Delimitation Commission 2002 recommendations. Though there wasn't any change in number of constituencies. There was significant apportionment of existing constituencies and change of boundaries.

== Alliances ==
United Democratic Front (UDF) is a Kerala legislative alliance and is allied to United Progressive Alliance (UPA) in the Lok Sabha. LDF comprises primarily of CPI(M) and the CPI, forming the Left Front in the national level. National Democratic Alliance (NDA), led by Bharatiya Janata Party (BJP) contested in all 20 seats.

=== United Democratic Front ===
No.	Party	Election Symbol	Seats contested
1.	Indian National Congress		17
2.	Indian Union Muslim League		2
3.	Kerala Congress (M)		1

=== Left Democratic Front ===
No.	Party	Election Symbol	Seats contested
1.	Communist Party of India (Marxist)	Key	14
2.	Communist Party of India	Star	4
3.	Kerala Congress		1
4.	Independent		1

=== National Democratic Alliance ===
No.	Party	Election Symbol	Seats contested
1.	Bharatiya Janata Party		19
2.	Janata Dal (United)		1

== List of Candidates ==
Constituency		UPA		Left Front		NDA	
#	Name	Party	Candidate	Party	Candidate	Party	Candidate
1	Kasaragod	INC	Shahida Kamal	CPM	P. Karunakaran	BJP	K. Surendran
2	Kannur	INC	K. Sudhakaran	CPM	K. K. Ragesh	BJP	P. P. Karunakaran M.
3	Vadakara	INC	M. Ramachandran	CPM	P. Sathidevi	BJP	K. P. Sreesan
4	Wayanad	INC	M. I. Shanavas	CPI	M. Rahmathulla	BJP	C. Vasudevan Master
5	Kozhikode	INC	M. K. Raghavan	CPM	P. A. Mohammed Riyas	BJP	V. Muraleedharan
6	Malappuram	IUML	E. Ahamed	CPM	T. K. Hamza	BJP	N. Aravindan
7	Ponnani	IUML	E. T. Md. Basheer	IND	Hussain Randathani	BJP	K. Janachandran Master
8	Palakkad	INC	Satheeshan Pacheni	CPM	M. B. Rajesh	BJP	C. K. Padmanabhan
9	Alathur	INC	N. K. Sudheer	CPM	P. K. Biju	BJP	M. Bindu Teacher
10	Thrissur	INC	P. C. Chacko	CPI	C. N. Jayadevan	BJP	Rema Regunandan
11	Chalakudy	INC	K. P. Dhanapalan	CPM	U. P. Joseph	BJP	K. V. Sabu
12	Ernakulam	INC	Prof. K. V. Thomas	CPM	Sindhu Joy	BJP	A. N. Radhakrishnan
13	Idukki	INC	P. T. Thomas	KEC	K. Francis George	BJP	Sreenagari Rajan
14	Kottayam	KC(M)	Jose K. Mani	CPM	K. Suresh Kurup	BJP	Narayanan Namboothiri
15	Alappuzha	INC	K. C. Venugopal	CPM	K. S. Manoj	JD(U)	P. J. Kurian
16	Mavelikkara	INC	Kodikkunnil Suresh	CPI	R. S. Anil	BJP	P. M. Velayudhan
17	Pathanamthitta	INC	Anto Antony	CPM	K. Anantha Gopan	BJP	B. Radhakrishna Menon
18	Kollam	INC	N. Peethambara Kurup	CPM	P. Rajendran	BJP	Vayakkal Madhu
19	Attingal	INC	G. Balachandran	CPM	Anirudhan Sampath	BJP	Thottakkadu Sasi
20	Thiruvananthapuram	INC	Shashi Tharoor	CPI	P. Ramachandran Nair	BJP	P. K. Krishna Das

== List of Elected MPs ==
No.	Name	Turnout%	Name	Party	Margin
1	Kasaragod	76.11	P. Karunakaran	Communist Party of India (Marxist)	64,427
2	Kannur	80.83	K. Sudhakaran	Indian National Congress	43,151
3	Vatakara	80.55	Mullappally Ramachandran	Indian National Congress	56,186
4	Wayanad	74.74	M. I. Shanavas	Indian National Congress	1,53,439
5	Kozhikode	75.68	M. K. Raghavan	Indian National Congress	838
6	Malappuram	76.81	E. Ahamed	Muslim League Kerala State Committee	1,15,597
7	Ponnani	77.17	E. T. Mohammed Basheer	Muslim League Kerala State Committee	82,684
8	Palakkad	73.47	M. B. Rajesh	Communist Party of India (Marxist)	1,820
9	Alathur	75.27	P. K. Biju	Communist Party of India (Marxist)	20,960
10	Thrissur	69.48	P. C. Chacko	Indian National Congress	25,151
11	Chalakudy	73.72	K. P. Dhanapalan	Indian National Congress	71,679
12	Ernakulam	72.81	K. V. Thomas	Indian National Congress	11,790
13	Idukki	73.95	P. T. Thomas	Indian National Congress	74,796
14	Kottayam	73.76	Jose K. Mani	Kerala Congress (M)	71,570
15	Alappuzha	79.15	K. C. Venugopal	Indian National Congress	57,635
16	Mavelikkara	70.34	Kodikunnil Suresh	Indian National Congress	48,048
17	Pathanamthitta	65.70	Anto Antony	Indian National Congress	1,11,206
18	Kollam	67.85	N. Peethambara Kurup	Indian National Congress	17,531
19	Attingal	66.25	A Sampath	Communist Party of India (Marxist)	18,341
20	Thiruvananthapuram	65.74	Shashi Tharoor	Indian National Congress	99,998

=== Constituency-Wise Detailed Results ===
No.	Constituency	UDF candidate	Votes	%	Party	LDF candidate	Votes	%	Party	NDA candidate	Votes	%	Party	Other candidate	Votes	%	Party	Winning alliance	Margin
1	Kasaragod	Shahida Kamal	3,21,095	37.91	INC	P. Karunakaran	3,85,522	45.51	CPI(M)	K. Surendran	1,25,482	14.81	BJP	K. H. Madhavi	5,518	0.7%	BSP	Left Democratic Front	64,427
2	Kannur	K. Sudhakaran	4,32,878	50.11	INC	K. K. Ragesh	3,89,727	45.12	CPI(M)	P. P. Karunakaran	27,123	3.14	BJP	K. Sudhakaran Kavinte	3,430	0.4%	IND	United Democratic Front (Kerala)	43,151
3	Vatakara	Mullappally Ramachandran	4,21,255	48.82	INC	P. Satheedevi	3,65,069	42.31	CPI(M)	K. P. Sreesan	40,391	4.68	BJP	T. P. Chandrasekharan	21,833	2.5%	IND	United Democratic Front (Kerala)	56,186
4	Wayanad	M. I. Shanavas	4,10,703	49.86	INC	M. Rahmathulla	2,57,264	42.31	CPI(M)	C. Vasudevan	19,623	4.1	BJP	K. Muraleedharan	99,663	12.1%	NCP	United Democratic Front (Kerala)	1,53,439
5	Kozhikode	M. K. Raghavan	3,42,309	42.92	INC	P. A. Mohamed Riyas	3,41,471	42.81	CPI(M)	V. Muraleedharan	89,718	11.25	BJP	P. Kumarankutty	5,871	0.7%	IND	United Democratic Front (Kerala)	838
6	Malappuram	E. Ahamed	4,27,940	54.64	IUML	T. K. Hamza	3,12,343	39.88	CPI(M)	N. Aravindan	36,016	4.6	BJP	E. A. Aboobacker	6,931	0.6%	IND	United Democratic Front (Kerala)	1,15,597
7	Ponnani	E. T. Muhammed Basheer	3,85,801	50.14	IUML	Hussain Randathani	3,03,117	39.4	IND	K. Janachandran	57,710	11.25	BJP	K. Sadanandan	4,321	2.6%	IND	United Democratic Front (Kerala)	82,684
8	Palakkad	Satheesan Pacheni	3,36,250	42.58	INC	M. B. Rajesh	338,070	42.81	CPI(M)	C. K. Padmanabhan	68,804	8.71	BJP	M. R. Murali	20,896	2.6%	IND	Left Democratic Front	1,820
9	Alathur	N. K. Sudheer	3,66,392	44.22	INC	P. K. Biju	3,87,352	46.75	CPI(M)	M. Bindu	53,890	6.5	BJP	K. K. Sudhir	7,588	0.9%	IND	Left Democratic Front	20,960
10	Thrissur	P. C. Chacko	3,85,297	47.23	INC	C. N. Jayadevan	3,60,146	44.14	CPI	Rama Ragunandan	54,680	6.7	BJP	N. Hariharan Nair	3,687	0.5%	IND	United Democratic Front (Kerala)	25,151
11	Chalakudy	K. P. Dhanapalan	3,99,035	50.33	INC	U. P. Joseph	3,27,356	41.29	CPI(M)	K. V. Sabu	45,367	5.72	BJP	Jose Maveli	7,544	0.9%	IND	United Democratic Front (Kerala)	71,679
12	Ernakulam	K. V. Thomas	3,42,845	46.03	INC	Sindhu Joy	3,31,055	44.44	CPI(M)	A. N. Radhakrishnan	52,968	6.5	BJP	Sherif Mohammed	4,083	0.5%	BSP	United Democratic Front (Kerala)	11,790
13	Idukki	P. T. Thomas	4,08,484	51.98	INC	K. Francis George	3,33,688	42.46	KEC	Sreenagiri Rajan	28,227	3.59	BJP	Biju M. John	5,567	0.7%	BSP	United Democratic Front (Kerala)	74,796
14	Kottayam	Jose K. Mani	4,04,962	50.13	KC(M)	K. Suresh Kurup	3,33,392	41.27	CPI(M)	N. K. Narayanan	37,422	4.63	BJP	Spencer Marks	11,432	1.4%	BSP	United Democratic Front (Kerala)	71,570
15	Alappuzha	K. C. Venugopal	4,68,679	51.62	INC	K. S. Manoj	4,11,044	45.27	CPI(M)	P.J Kurian	1,025	0.1%	JD(U)	Sony J. Kalyankumar	19,711	2.17	IND	United Democratic Front (Kerala)	57,635
16	Mavelikkara	Kodikkunnil Suresh	3,97,211	49.42	INC	R. S. Anil	3,49,163	43.44	CPI	P. M. Velayudhan	40,992	5.1	BJP	N. D. Mohan	8,681	1.1%	BSP	United Democratic Front (Kerala)	48,048
17	Pathanamthitta	Anto Antony	4,08,232	51.21	INC	Kananthagopan	2,97,026	37.26	CPI(M)	B. Radhakrishna Menon	56,294	7.06	BJP	K. K. Nair	22,424	2.8%	BSP	United Democratic Front (Kerala)	1,11,206
18	Kollam	N. Peethambarakurup	3,57,401	47.52	INC	P. Rajendran	3,39,870	45.19	CPI(M)	Vayakal Madhu	33,078	4.4	BJP	K. M. Jayanandan	6,752	0.9%	BSP	United Democratic Front (Kerala)	17,531
19	Attingal	G. Balachandran	3,09,695	42.83	INC	A. Sampath	3,28,036	45.37	CPI(M)	Thottakkad Sasi	47,620	6.59	BJP	J. Sudhakaran	15,558	2.1%	BSP	Left Democratic Front	18,341
20	Thiruvananthapuram	Shashi Tharoor	3,26,725	44.29	INC	P. Ramachandran Nair	2,26,727	30.74	CPI	P. K. Krishnadas	84,094	11.4	BJP	A. Neelalohithadasan Nadar	86,233	11.7%	BSP	United Democratic Front (Kerala)	99,998

=== Performance of Political Parties ===
No.	Party	Political Front	Seats	swing	Votes	%Votes	±pp
1	INC	United Democratic Front (Kerala)	13	▲13	6,434,486	40.13	▲8.00
2	CPI(M)	Left Democratic Front	4	▼8	4,887,333	30.48	▼1.04
3	IUML	United Democratic Front (Kerala)	2	▲1	813,741	5.07	▲0.21
4	KC(M)	United Democratic Front (Kerala)	1	▲1	404,962	2.53	▲1.14
5	CPI	Left Democratic Front	0	▼3	1,193,300	7.44	▼0.45
6	BJP	NDA	0	Steady	1,011,563	6.31	▼4.07

Vote Share by alliance
1. United Democratic Front (Kerala) (47.7%)
2. Left Democratic Front (41.9%)
3. NDA (6.43%)
4. Other (3.95%)

=== Performance by alliance ===
No.	Alliance	Seats contested	Seats won	Votes	%
1	United Democratic Front (Kerala)	20	16	76,53,189	47.73
2	Left Democratic Front	20	4	67,17,438	41.89
3	NDA	20	0	10,31,274	6.43
4	Others	157	0	6,32,974	3.95
Total		217	20	1,60,34,875	100.00

== Post-election Union Council of Ministers from Kerala ==
#	Name	Constituency	Designation	Department	From	To	Party
1	A. K. Antony	Rajya Sabha	Cabinet Minister	Defence	23 May 2009	26 May 2014	INC
2	Vayalar Ravi	Rajya Sabha	Cabinet Minister	Overseas Indian Affairs	28 May 2009	26 May 2014	INC
2	Vayalar Ravi	Rajya Sabha	Cabinet Minister	Civil Aviation	19 January 2011	18 December 2011	INC
2	Vayalar Ravi	Rajya Sabha	Cabinet Minister	Micro, Small and Medium Enterprises	10 August 2012	28 October 2012	INC
2	Vayalar Ravi	Rajya Sabha	Cabinet Minister	Science and Technology	10 August 2012	28 October 2012	INC
2	Vayalar Ravi	Rajya Sabha	Cabinet Minister	Earth Sciences	10 August 2012	28 October 2012	INC
3	Mullappally Ramachandran	Vadakara	MoS	Home Affairs	28 May 2009	26 May 2014	INC
4	K. V. Thomas	Ernakulam	MoS	Agriculture	28 May 2009	19 January 2011	INC
4	K. V. Thomas	Ernakulam	MoS	Consumer Affairs, Food and Public Distribution	28 May 2009	19 January 2011	INC
4	K. V. Thomas	Ernakulam	MoS (I/C)	Consumer Affairs, Food and Public Distribution	19 January 2011	26 May 2014	INC
5	Shashi Tharoor	Thiruvananthapuram	MoS	External Affairs	28 May 2009	18 April 2010	INC
5	Shashi Tharoor	Thiruvananthapuram	MoS	Human Resource Development	28 October 2012	26 May 2014	INC
6	K. C. Venugopal	Alappuzha	MoS	Power	19 January 2011	28 October 2012	INC
6	K. C. Venugopal	Alappuzha	MoS	Civil Aviation	28 October 2012	26 May 2014	INC
7	Kodikunnil Suresh	Mavelikkara	MoS	Labour and Employment	28 October 2012	26 May 2014	INC
8	E. Ahamed	Malappuram	MoS	Railways	28 May 2009	19 January 2011	IUML
8	E. Ahamed	Malappuram	MoS	External Affairs	19 January 2011	26 May 2014	IUML
8	E. Ahamed	Malappuram	MoS	Human Resource Development	12 July 2011	28 October 2012	IUML

== Assembly segments wise lead of Parties ==
Party		Assembly segments
UDF	INC	81
UDF	IUML	13
UDF	KC(M)	6
UDF	Total	100
LDF	CPI(M)	36
LDF	CPI	3
LDF	Independent	1
LDF	Total	40
Total		140
