= Newman College, Thodupuzha =

College in Kerala, India

- Type: Aided
- Established: 1964
- Affiliations: Mahatma Gandhi University, Kottayam
- Location: Thodupuzha, Kerala, India; 9.8989°N 76.7245°E
- Language: English
- Website: www.newmancollege.ac.in
- Location within Kerala Location within India

Newman College is a Syro Malabar Catholic institution of higher education in Thodupuzha, Kerala, India, administered by the Diocese of Kothamangalam. It is a college in the Idukki District, with over 2000 students, 66 teaching staff, and 36 non-teaching staff. The college ranked 78 in All India Ranking published by National Institutional Ranking Framework during 2019. It is named after St. John Henry Newman.

== Controversies ==
The college is best known internationally for an incident in 2010. On 4 July 2010 Professor T J Joseph was attacked and had his arm severed by Islamic radicals claiming that a punctuation exercise he had set in an examination was insulting to Islam. Though the college raised 600,000 rupees for his medical care, he was on 4 September dismissed from the college's employment on the grounds that he had "hurt the feelings of a community" and caused a "loss of goodwill to the Church". He was reinstated in 2014.

In August 2015, Mahatma Gandhi University, Syndicate initiated disciplinary action against the principal and management of the college. Grievance redressal committee of the University found that the college denied admission to a poor student as he could not pay huge amount of money as donation. The Syndicate observed that the Principal of the college is "flouting University directions from time to time and functioning irregularly".

== Notable alumni ==
- P. T. Thomas, Former member of Kerala Legislative Assembly
- Joice George, Former Member of Parliament
