= M. M. Lawrence =

Indian politician (1929–2024)

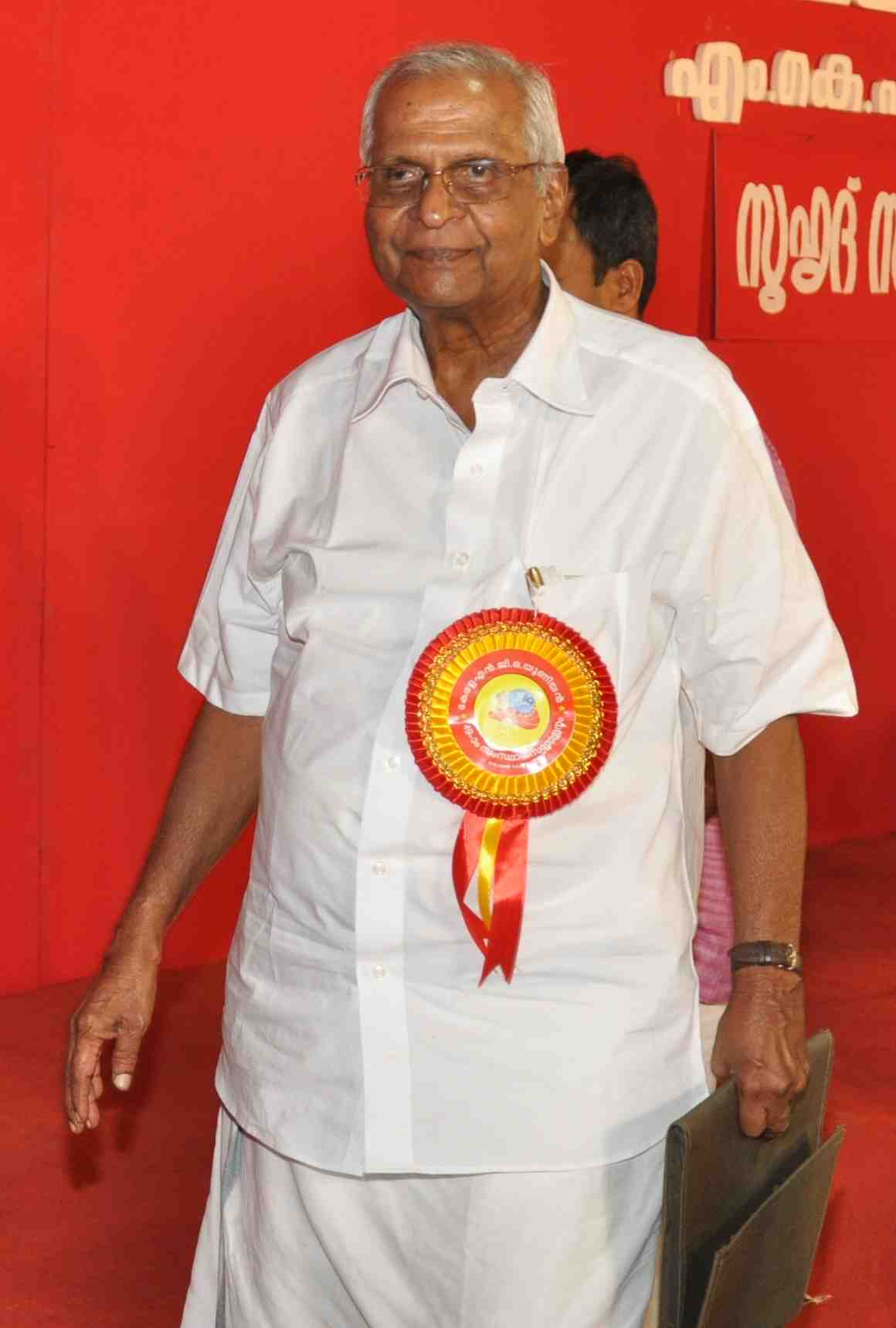
Lawrence c.2012

M. M. Lawrence (15 June 1929 – 21 September 2024) was an Indian politician and a member of the Communist Party of India Marxist (CPIM).

== Life and career ==
Lawrence was born on 15 June 1929. He served as a member of the party's central committee until 1998. He was a convenor of the Left Democratic Front in Kerala. From 1980 to 1984 he served as member of parliament for the Idukki constituency.

Following his departure from the CPIM central committee, he took roles at a local level in Ernakulam district. He was also leader of the Centre of Indian Trade Unions (CITU) and president of Cochin Port Labour Union.

Lawrence died on 21 September 2024, at the age of 95.

Lok Sabha
Preceded by C. M. Stephen	Member of Parliament for Idukki; 1980–1984	Succeeded by P.J. Kurien
