= Idukki Lok Sabha constituency =

Lok Sabha Constituency in Kerala, India

Coordinates: 9.84°N 76.90°E

Idukki KL-13
- Lok Sabha constituency
- Idukki Lok Sabha constituency

Constituency details
- Country: India
- Region: South India
- State: Kerala
- Assembly constituencies: Muvattupuzha; Kothamangalam; Devikulam; Udumbanchola; Thodupuzha; Idukki; Peerumade
- Established: 1977
- Total electors: 1,203,258 (2019)
- Reservation: None

Member of Parliament
- 18th Lok Sabha
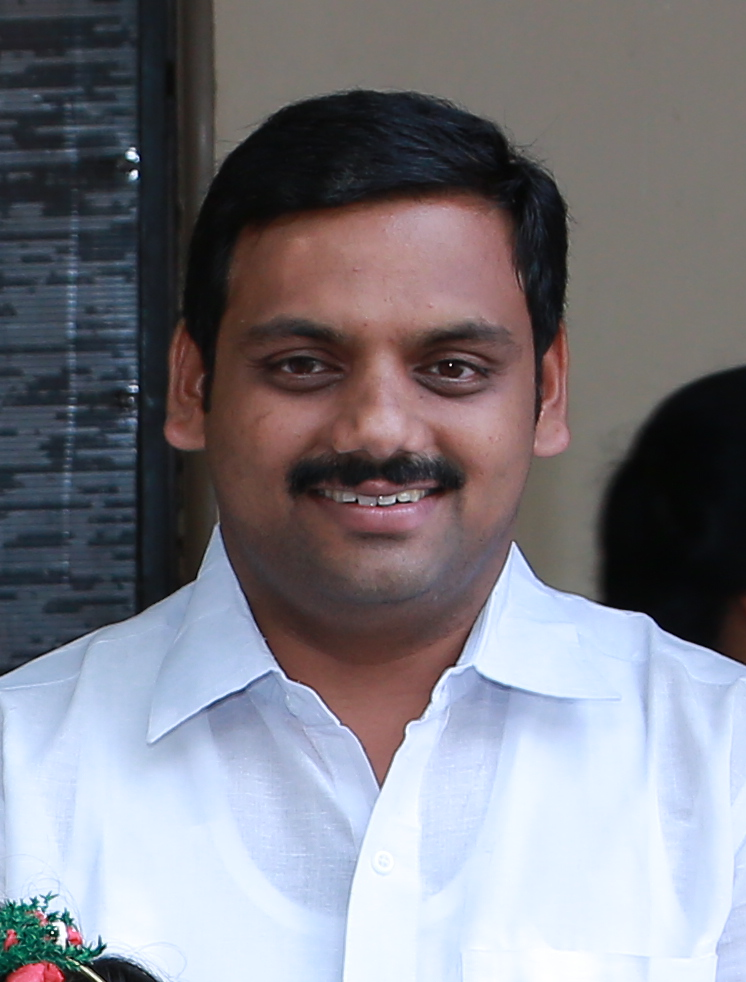
- Incumbent Dean Kuriakose
- Party: INC
- Alliance: UDF
- Elected year: 2024

Idukki Lok Sabha constituency is one of the 20 Lok Sabha (parliamentary) constituencies in the Indian state of Kerala.

== Assembly segments ==
Idukki Lok Sabha constituency is composed of the following assembly segments:

No	Name	District	Member	Party	2024 Lead
86	Muvattupuzha	Ernakulam	Mathew Kuzhalnadan	INC	INC
87	Kothamangalam	Ernakulam	Shibu Thekkumpuram	KEC	INC
88	Devikulam (SC)	Idukki	Francis Raja	INC	INC
89	Udumbanchola	Idukki	Senapathy Venu	INC	INC
90	Thodupuzha	Idukki	Apu John Joseph	KEC	INC
91	Idukki	Idukki	Roy K Paulose	INC	INC
92	Peerumade	Idukki	Cyriac Thomas	INC	INC

== Members of Parliament ==
Year	Member	Party
Peermade Lok Sabha constituency
1967	P. K. Vasudevan Nair	Communist Party of India
1971	M. M. Joseph	Kerala Congress
Idukki Lok Sabha constituency
1977	C. M. Stephen	Indian National Congress
1980	M. M. Lawrence	Communist Party of India (Marxist)
1984	P. J. Kurien	Indian National Congress
1989	Pala K. M. Matthew	Indian National Congress
1991	Pala K. M. Matthew	Indian National Congress
1996	A. C. Jose	Indian National Congress
1998	P. C. Chacko	Indian National Congress
1999	K. Francis George	Kerala Congress
2004	K. Francis George	Kerala Congress
2009	P. T. Thomas	Indian National Congress
2014	Joice George (Note: Independent supported by LDF)	Independent politician
2019	Dean Kuriakose	Indian National Congress
2024	Dean Kuriakose	Indian National Congress

== Election results ==
Vote share of Winning candidates
2024	52.02%
2019	54.21%
2014	46.60%
2009	51.98%
2004	48.52%
1999	47.20%
1998	46.76%
1996	48.84%
1991	48.88%
1989	53.62%
1984	57.67%
1980	49.44%
1977	54.84%
1971	60.65%
1967	46.37%

=== General Elections 2029 ===
2029 Indian general election: Idukki
Party	Candidate	Votes	%	±%
INC	Dean Kuriakose			
LDF				
NDA				
NOTA	None of the above			
Margin of victory				
Turnout				
		Swing		

=== 2024 ===
2024 Indian general election: Idukki
Party	Candidate	Votes	%	±%
INC	Dean Kuriakose	432,372	52.02	▼2.19
CPI(M)	Joice George	298,645	35.93	
BDJS	Adv. Sangeetha Viswanathan	91,323	10.99	▲2.44
NOTA	None of the Above	9,519	1.15	▲0.57
BSP	Adv. Russel Joy	4,437	0.53	▲0.21
IND	Jomon John	1,819	0.22	
VCK	Shaji	1,508	0.18	
IND	P. K. Sajeevan	1,034	0.12	
Majority		133,727	16.09	▼2.51
Turnout		840,657	67.19	▼9.15
INC hold		Swing		

=== 2019 ===
2019 Indian general election: Idukki
Party	Candidate	Votes	%	±%
INC	Adv. Dean Kuriakose	498,493	54.21	▲13.77
IND	Adv. Joice George	327,440	35.61	▼10.99
BDJS	Biju Krishnan	78,648	8.55	
NOTA	None of the Above	5,317	0.58	▼0.93
BSP	P. T. Leethesh	2,906	0.32	▲0.02
IND	Gomathy	1,985	0.22	
VCK	M. Selvaraj	1,628	0.18	
IND	K. A. Baby	1,556	0.17	
IND	Reji Njallani	1,324	0.14	
Majority		171,053	18.60	▲12.44
Turnout		919,297	76.34	▲5.59
INC gain from Independent		Swing		

=== 2014 ===
2014 Indian general election: Idukki
Party	Candidate	Votes	%	±%
IND	Adv. Joice George	382,019	46.60	
INC	Adv. Dean Kuriakose	331,477	40.44	▼11.54
BJP	Adv. Sabu Varghese	50,438	6.15	▲2.56
NOTA	None of the Above	12,338	1.51	
AAP	Silvi Sunil	11,215	1.37	
SDPI	Muhammed Sharafudheen	10,401	1.27	
CPIM	T. K. Tomy	3,971	0.48	
BSP	Appanchira Ponnappan	2,477	0.30	▼0.41
IND	9 Independent Candidates	15,430	1.88	
Majority		50,542	6.16	▼3.36
Turnout		819,766	70.75	▼3.19
Independent gain from INC		Swing		

=== 2009 ===
2009 Indian general election: Idukki
Party	Candidate	Votes	%	±%
INC	Adv. P. T. Thomas	408,484	51.98	▲12.97
KEC	Adv. K. Francis George	333,688	42.46	▼6.06
BJP	Sreenagari Rajan	28,227	3.59	▼4.40
BSP	Adv. Biju M. John	5,567	0.71	▲0.01
VCK	Vasudevan	3,014	0.38	
IND	M. A. Soosai	2,937	0.37	
IND	Baby	1,454	0.19	
IND	Jose Kuttiyany	1,154	0.15	
IND	Kanchiyar Peethambaran	739	0.09	
IND	Adv. Chittoor Rajamannar	637	0.08	
Majority		74,796	9.52	▲0.01
Turnout		785,901	73.94	
INC gain from KEC		Swing		

=== 2004 ===
2004 Indian general election: Idukki
Party	Candidate	Votes	%	±%
KEC	K. Francis George	353,905	48.52	▲1.32
INC	Benny Behanan	284,521	39.01	▼6.99
BJP	S. T. B. Mohandas	58,290	7.99	
IND	C. K. Janu	11,628	1.59	
IND	Vijayan	7,379	1.01	
BSP	T. C. Thankappan	5,073	0.70	▲0.22
IND	P. R. Suresh Kumar	2,750	0.38	
IND	Aravindan	2,464	0.34	
IND	Ashraf	2,195	0.30	
IND	Dr. T. A. Babu	1,221	0.17	
Majority		69,384	9.51	▲8.31
Turnout		729,426		
KEC hold		Swing		

=== 1999 ===
1999 Indian general election: Idukki
Party	Candidate	Votes	%	±%
KEC	K. Francis George	365,313	47.20	
INC	Prof. P. J. Kurian	356,015	46.00	
JD(U)	Adv. Tomy Cheruvally	35,497	4.59	
IND	Dharmaraj	7,215	0.93	
BSP	Sasidharan	3,703	0.48	
IND	Francis Varghese	2,949	0.38	
IND	Peruvanthanam Pethambaran	1,471	0.19	
IND	Devarajan Kumaramangalam	1,220	0.16	
IND	Joseph Thomas	333	0.04	
IND	Babu	188	0.02	
Majority		9,298	1.20	
Turnout		778,940	69.46	
KEC gain from INC		Swing		

=== 1998 ===
1998 Indian general election: Idukki
Party	Candidate	Votes	%	±%
INC	P. C. Chacko	333,999	46.76	
KEC	K. Francis George	327,649	45.87	
BJP	Adv. D. Asokakumar	46,130	6.46	
BSP	Raj Mohan Thampi	3,824	0.54	
IND	Devarajan Kumaramangalam	1,129	0.16	
IND	P. C. Chacko	583	0.08	
IND	Shukkur Ismail	346	0.05	
IND	George Joseph	333	0.05	
IND	P. D. Chacko	305	0.04	
Majority		6,350	0.89	
Turnout		719,111	68.27	
INC hold		Swing		

=== 1996 ===
1996 Indian general election: Idukki
Party	Candidate	Votes	%	±%
INC	A. C. Jose	350,679	48.84	
KEC	K. Francis George	320,539	44.64	
BJP	D. Asok Kumar	32,107	4.47	
BSP	E. A. Aboobakar	5,708	0.79	
IND	Devarajan Kumaramangalam	4,509	0.63	
IND	Nadakuzhiyil Janardhanan Nair	1,735	0.24	
IND	Ponnuswamy	1,204	0.17	
IND	Peruvanthanam Peethambaran	928	0.13	
IND	N. Ramachandran Kartha	639	0.09	
Majority		30,140	4.20	
Turnout		729,832	70.56	
INC hold		Swing		

=== 1991 ===
1991 Indian general election: Idukki
Party	Candidate	Votes	%	±%
INC	Palai K. M. Mathew	345,139	48.88	
KEC	P. J. Joseph	319,933	45.31	
BJP	K. Madhusoodhanan Nair	25,197	3.57	
IND	Peruvanthanam Peethambaran	5,009	0.71	
BSP	Madhu Sivadas	4,837	0.68	
IND	Sivan Kozhikkamaly	1,235	0.17	
IND	K. G. Devarajan Nair	1,189	0.17	
IND	I. K. Rajakumar	829	0.12	
IND	Balan Pillai Kizhakkanattu	733	0.10	
IND	John Thomas Pathazhakallungal	724	0.10	
IND	John Peruvanthanam	716	0.10	
IND	Rainge Eeso	440	0.06	
IND	R. Janardhanan Nair Nadhakuzhiyil	179	0.03	
Majority		25,206	3.57	
Turnout		714,298	71.58	
INC hold		Swing		

=== 1989 ===
1989 Indian general election: Idukki
Party	Candidate	Votes	%	±%
INC	Palai K. M. Mathew	398,516	53.62	
CPI(M)	M. C. Josephine	307,037	41.31	
BJP	M. N. Jayachandran	25,354	3.41	
BSP	T. M. Joseph	2,862	0.39	
JP	Jacob Thomas	1,756	0.24	
DKP	Joseph Varghese	1,560	0.21	
IND	Nadakuzhiyil Janardhanan Nair	1,473	0.20	
IND	Ramaswamy Govindadan	1,288	0.17	
IND	Gopalan Muthuswamy	1,162	0.16	
IND	Samuel Chandy	680	0.09	
IND	Shahul Hameed	416	0.06	
IND	Idicula	338	0.05	
IND	Balan Pillai Kizhakkanattu	320	0.04	
IND	Joseph Xavier	219	0.03	
IND	V. Pandia Rajan	210	0.03	
Majority		91,479	12.31	
Turnout		746,958	76.77	
INC hold		Swing		

=== 1984 ===
1984 Indian general election: Idukki
Party	Candidate	Votes	%	±%
INC	P. J. Kurian	308,056	57.67	
CPI	C. A. Kurian	177,432	33.22	
IND	Joseph Michael	44,472	8.33	
IND	George Mathew	1,230	0.23	
IND	Kizhakkenattu Balan Pillai	1,187	0.22	
IND	Michael Kalliyayalil	868	0.16	
IND	P. S. Muhammed	583	0.11	
IND	K. P. Rajapandiyan	344	0.06	
Majority		130,624	24.45	
Turnout		541,206	75.40	
INC gain from CPI(M)		Swing		

=== 1980 ===
1980 Indian general election: Idukki
Party	Candidate	Votes	%	±%
CPI(M)	M. M. Lawrence	184,919	49.44	
IND	T. S. John	177,886	47.56	
IND	Mechal Kallivayalil	7,524	2.01	
IND	K. Korason Easo	1,333	0.36	
IND	P. Sreedharan Pillai	1,218	0.33	
IND	Janardhanan Nair Raman Pillai	1,121	0.30	
Majority		7,033	1.88	
Turnout		377,284	54.12	
CPI(M) gain from INC		Swing		

=== 1977 ===
1977 Indian general election: Idukki
Party	Candidate	Votes	%	±%
INC	C. M. Stephen	228,035	54.84	
KC(B)	M. M. Joseph	148,778	35.78	
IND	M. L. Jayaprakash	25,764	6.20	
IND	M. K. Kunjol	7,042	1.69	
IND	Chittur Sankaran	3,382	0.81	
IND	Balan Pillai Kizhkkanattu	1,928	0.46	
IND	M. Christdhas	884	0.21	
Majority		79,257	19.06	
Turnout		426,869	73.80	
INC gain from KEC		Swing		

=== 1971 ===
1971 Indian general election: Peermade
Party	Candidate	Votes	%	±%
KEC	M. M. Joseph	162,428	60.65	
IND	V. I. Thomas	87,804	32.78	
SWA	Joseph Chazhikat	14,716	5.49	
IND	Kurian Cherian	1,896	0.71	
IND	Massilamoney Christ Dhas	982	0.37	
Majority		74,624	27.87	
Turnout		269,222	50.96	
KEC gain from CPI		Swing		

=== 1967 ===
1967 Indian general election: Peermade
Party	Candidate	Votes	%	±%
CPI	P. K. Vasudevan Nair	142,089	46.37	
SWA	P. D. Thommen	99,623	32.51	
INC	K. T. Thomas	64,698	21.11	
Majority		42,466	13.86	
Turnout		321,043	71.41	
CPI win (new seat)				

== See also ==
- Idukki district
- List of constituencies of the Lok Sabha
- 2014 Indian general election in Kerala
- 2014 Indian general election

== Notes ==
Lok Sabha
Preceded by Satara	Constituency represented by the leader of the opposition 1978 – 1979	Succeeded by Satara
