= Dean Kuriakose =

Indian politician

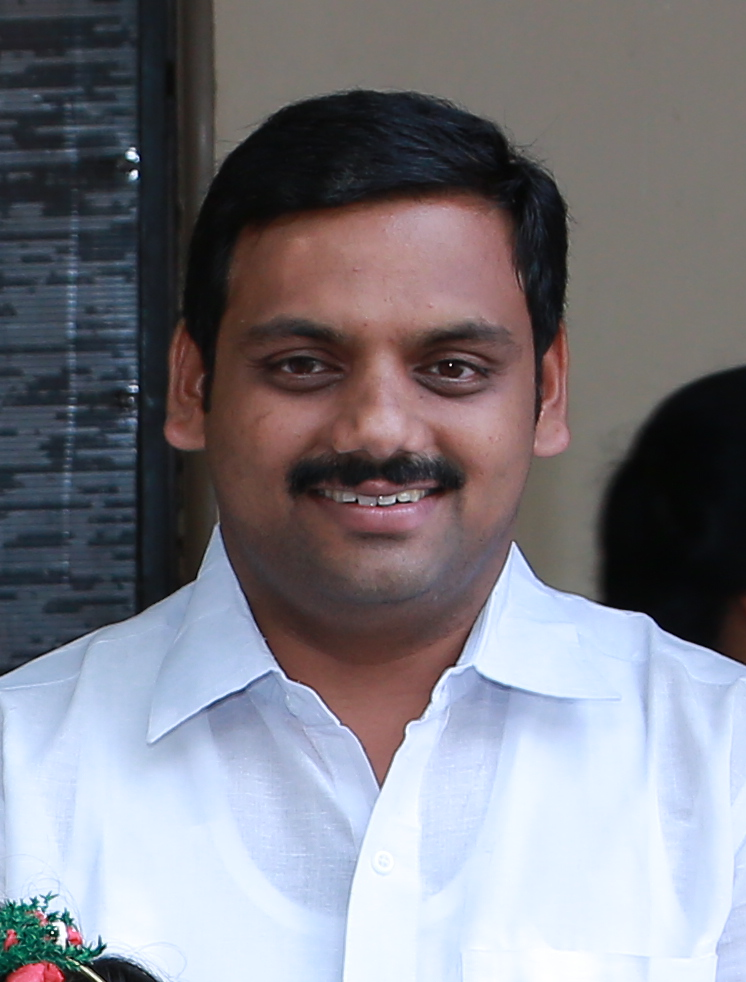

Member of Parliament, Lok Sabha
- Incumbent
- Assumed office 23 May 2019
- Preceded by: Joice George
- Constituency: Idukki

President, Kerala Youth Congress
- In office 2012–2020

Personal details
- Born: 27 June 1981 (age 45) Paingottoor, Ernakulam, Kerala
- Party: Indian National Congress
- Spouse: Dr. Neetha Paul
- Children: Danilo Dean

Dean Kuriakose (27 June 1981) is an Indian politician from Kerala and a member of the Indian National Congress. Dean Kuriakose was the president of the Youth Congress Kerala wing of Indian Youth Congress. He was elected as member of parliament from Idukki Lok Sabha constituency in 2019 with record lead of 171,053 votes. He was also elected as member of parliament from Idukki Lok Sabha constituency in 2024 with lead of 133,727 votes.
