= Joice George =

Indian politician (born 1970)

Member of the Indian Parliament for Idukki
- In office 16 May 2014 – 23 May 2019
- Preceded by: P. T. Thomas
- Succeeded by: Dean Kuriakose
- Constituency: Idukki

Personal details
- Born: 26 April 1970 (age 56) Vazhathope, Idukki, Kerala
- Party: Independent
- Spouse: Smt. Anupa Mathew
- Children: 1
- Occupation: Advocate
- As of 15 December, 2016

Joice George (born 26 April 1970) is an Indian politician and a Member of Parliament of the 16th Lok Sabha of India.

== Personal life ==
He was born as son of Paliath George in Idukki district and completed his education from Newman College, Thodupuzha, Kottayam and Thiruvananthapuram.

== Political career ==
He practiced as a lawyer for sixteen years and entered politics through High Range Samrakshana Samithi (HRSS) protests against Western Ghats Ecology Expert Panel report (Gadgil Report).

He represented the Idukki constituency of Kerala having contested as a CPI(M)-supported independent.

== Electoral History ==
=== Lok Sabha ===
Year	Constituency	Party	Votes	%	Opponent	Party	Votes	%	Result	Margin	%
2014	Idukki	IND	382,019	46.57	Adv. Dean Kuriakose	INC	331,477	40.41	Won	▲50,542	▲6.16
2019	Idukki	IND	327,440	35.61	Adv. Dean Kuriakose	INC	498,493	54.21	Lost	▼171,053	▼18.60
2024	Idukki	CPI(M)	298,645	35.93	Adv. Dean Kuriakose	INC	432,372	52.02	Lost	▼133,727	▼16.09

== Controversies ==
- In 2017, the Sub Collector Devikulam taluk cancelled title deed of 28 acres of land that was in the name of him and family calling it encroachment. This land was acquired in 2005 from for Scheduled Caste owners.
- In 2021, he caught himself in middle of a controversy by calling Rahul Gandhi, "unmarried trouble maker".
- In 2022 he made a controversial remark on Buffer Zone which was antithetical to his stand on Gadgil Report.
