= Chalakudy Lok Sabha constituency =

Constituency of the Indian parliament in Kerala

Coordinates: 10.3°N 76.3°E

Chalakudy KL-11
- Lok Sabha constituency
- Chalakudy Lok Sabha constituency

Constituency details
- Country: India
- Region: South India
- State: Kerala
- Assembly constituencies: Kaipamangalam; Chalakudy; Kodungallur; Perumbavoor; Angamaly; Aluva; Kunnathunad
- Established: 2009
- Reservation: None

Member of Parliament
- 18th Lok Sabha
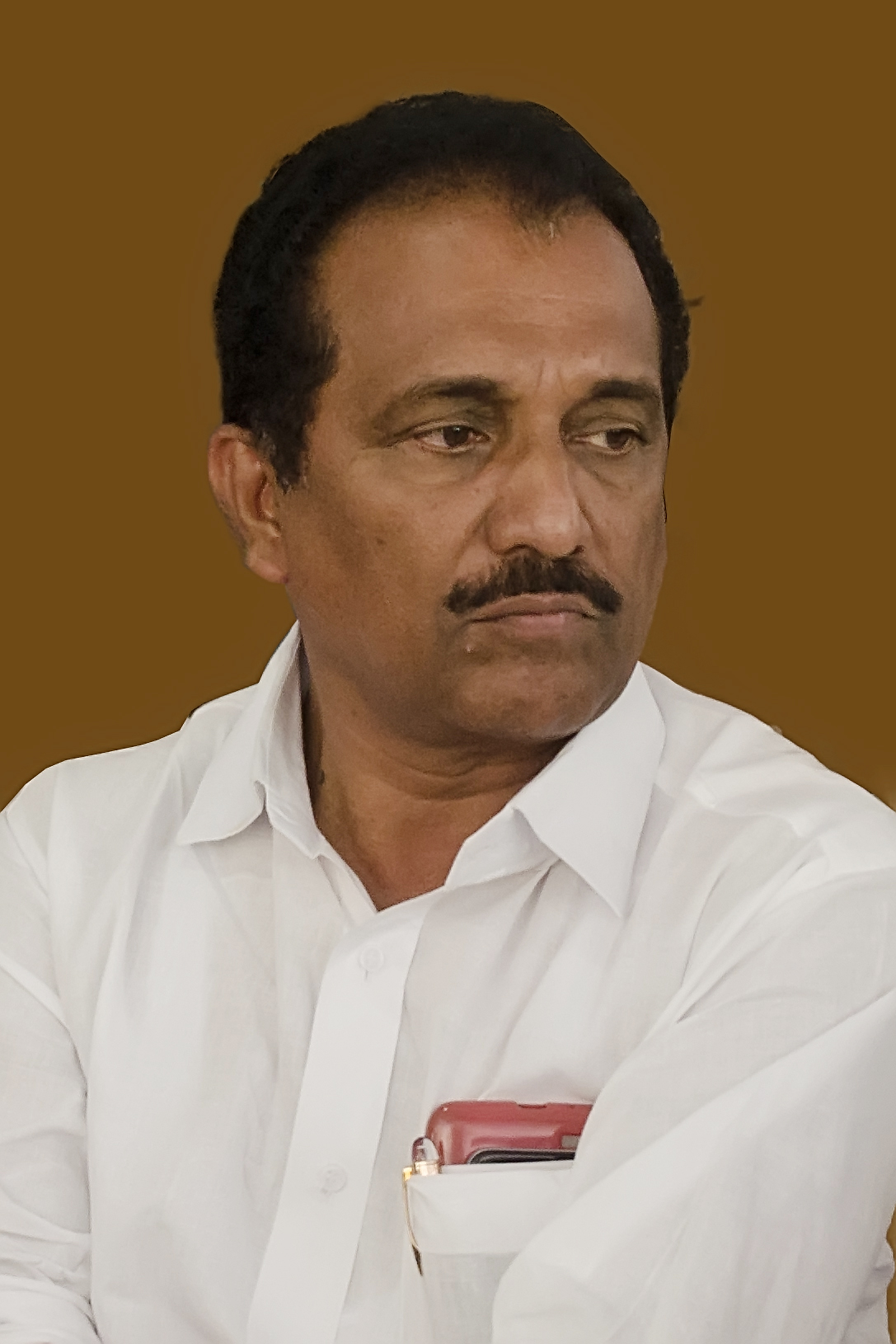
- Incumbent Benny Behanan
- Party: INC
- Alliance: UDF
- Elected year: 2024

Chalakudy is one of the 20 Lok Sabha (parliamentary) constituencies in the South Indian state of Kerala. It came into existence in 2008, following the delimitation of parliamentary constituencies based on recommendations of the Delimitation Commission of India. The constituency comprises seven assembly segments spread over two districts—Thrissur (3) and Ernakulam (4).

== Assembly segments ==
Chalakudy Lok Sabha constituency comprises the following seven legislative assembly segments:

No	Name	District	Member	Party	2024 Lead
69	Kaipamangalam	Thrissur	K. K Valsaraj	CPI	CPI(M)
72	Chalakudy	Thrissur	T. J. Saneesh Kumar Joseph	INC	INC
73	Kodungallur	Thrissur	O. J. Janeesh	INC	CPI(M)
74	Perumbavoor	Ernakulam	Manoj Moothedan	INC	INC
75	Angamaly	Ernakulam	Roji M. John	INC	INC
76	Aluva	Ernakulam	Anwar Sadath	INC	INC
84	Kunnathunad (SC)	Ernakulam	V. P. Sajeendran	INC	INC

Kaipamangalam assembly segment came into existence in 2008, following delimitation of legislative assembly constituencies. Chalakudy, Kodungallur, Perumbavoor, and Angamaly were part of the erstwhile Mukundapuram Lok Sabha constituency.

== Members of Parliament ==
Year	Member	Party
As Crangannur in Thiru–Kochi
1952	K. T. Achuthan	Indian National Congress
As Mukundapuram
1957	Narayankutty Menon	Communist Party of India
1962	Panampilly Govinda Menon	Indian National Congress
1967	Panampilly Govinda Menon	Indian National Congress
1971	A. C. George	Indian National Congress
1977	A. C. George	Indian National Congress
1980	E. Balanandan	Communist Party of India
1984	K. Mohandas	Kerala Congress
1989	Savithri Lakshmanan	Indian National Congress
1989	A. C. Jose	Indian National Congress
1991	Savithri Lakshmanan	Indian National Congress
1996	P. C. Chacko	Indian National Congress
1999	K. Karunakaran	Indian National Congress
2004	Lonappan Nambadan	Communist Party of India
As Chalakudy
2009	K. P. Dhanapalan	Indian National Congress
2014	Innocent Vareed Thekkethala (Note: Left Democratic Front supported candidate)	Independent politician
2019	Benny Behanan	Indian National Congress
2024	Benny Behanan	Indian National Congress

== Election results ==
=== General Elections 2029 ===
2029 Indian general election: Chalakudy
Party	Candidate	Votes	%	±%
INC				
LDF				
NDA				
NOTA	None of the above			
Margin of victory				
Turnout				
		Swing		

=== General Election 2024 ===
2024 Indian general election: Chalakudy
Party	Candidate	Votes	%	±%
INC	Benny Behanan	394,171	41.44	▼6.37
CPI(M)	C. Raveendranath	3,30,417	34.73	▲0.28
BDJS	K.M. Unnikrishnan	1,06,400	11.18	
TTP	Adv Charley Paul	1,05,642	11.11	
NOTA	None of the above	8,063	0.85	
BSP	Rosilin Chacko	2,410	0.25	
Majority		63,754		
Turnout		9,53,520	72.72	
INC hold		Swing		

By Assembly Segments (2024)

No.	Constituency	Party	Lead
69	Kaipamangalam	CPI(M)	10,688
72	Chalakudy	INC	5,716
73	Kodungallur	CPI(M)	366
74	Perumbavoor	INC	13,950
75	Angamaly	INC	16,867
114	Aluva	INC	23,921
115	Kunnathunad (SC)	INC	13,484

=== 2019 ===
According to Election Commission, there are 11,85,268 registered voters in Chalakudy Constituency for 2019 Lok Sabha Election.

2019 Indian general election: Chalakudy
Party	Candidate	Votes	%	±%
INC	Benny Behanan	473,444	47.81	▲8.87
CPI(M)	Innocent	3,41,170	34.45	▼6.05
BJP	A. N. Radhakrishnan	1,28,996	15.6	▲5.11
SDPI	P. P. Moidheen Kunju	4,687	0.5	▼1.13
NOTA	None of the above	7,578	0.8	▼0.39
Margin of victory		1,32,274	13.36	
Turnout		9,90,433	80.51	
INC gain from CPI(M)		Swing		

=== General election, 2014 ===
2014 Indian general election: Chalakudy
Party	Candidate	Votes	%	±%
LDF	Innocent (Note: Left Democratic Front supported candidate)	358,440	40.50	N/A
INC	P. C. Chacko	3,44,556	38.93	−11.40
BJP	B. Gopalakrishnan	92,848	10.49	+4.77
AAP	K.M. Noordeen	35,189	3.98	N/A
SDPI	Shafeer Muhammed	14,386	1.63	N/A
WPOI	K. Ambujakshan	12,942	1.46	N/A
NOTA	None of the above	10,552	1.19	−−−
Margin of victory		13,884	1.57	−7.47
Turnout		8,84,033	76.94	
LDF gain from INC		Swing		

=== 2009 ===
2009 Indian general election: Chalakudy
Party	Candidate	Votes	%	±%
INC	K. P. Dhanapalan	399,035	50.33	
CPI(M)	Adv. U. P. Joseph	327,356	41.29	
BJP	Adv. K. V. Sabu	45,367	5.72	
BSP	Muttam Abdullah	3,003	0.38	
LJP	Hamsa Kalaparambath	828	0.10	
IND	Jose Maveli	7,544	0.95	
IND	C. A. Haseena	4,441	0.56	
IND	T. S. Narayanan Master	2,089	0.26	
IND	U. P. Jose	1,522	0.19	
IND	Dr. P. S. Babu	979	0.12	
IND	Johnny K. Cheeku	603	0.08	
Majority		71,679	9.04	
Turnout		792,767		
INC gain from CPI(M)		Swing		

=== 2004 ===
2004 Indian general election: Mukundapuram
Party	Candidate	Votes	%	±%
CPI(M)	Lonappan Nambadan	375,175	51.89	
INC	Padmaja Venugopal	258,078	35.69	
BJP	Prof. Mathew Pailee	62,338	8.62	
IND	Rani Jose	7,999	1.11	
IND	Sabu Ali	7,071	0.98	
IND	D. R. Pisharody	6,020	0.83	
BSP	Adv. T. K. Manoj	4,377	0.61	
IND	Mohammed Asharaf	1,951	0.27	
Majority		117,097	16.20	
Turnout		723,009		
CPI(M) gain from INC		Swing		

=== 1999 ===
1999 Indian general election: Mukundapuram
Party	Candidate	Votes	%	±%
INC	K. Karunakaran	397,156	50.56	
CPI(M)	E. M. Sreedharan	344,693	43.88	
SRP	M. S. Muraleedharan	30,779	3.92	
IND	M. K. Thankappan	4,071	0.52	
IND	K. K. Janaky	3,272	0.42	
IND	P. N. Balakrishnan	1,979	0.25	
BSP	Sunny K. John	1,826	0.23	
IND	B. V. Raveendran	1,168	0.15	
IND	V. S. Sreedharan	634	0.08	
Majority		52,463	6.68	
Turnout		792,212	73.12	
INC hold		Swing		

=== 1998 ===
1998 Indian general election: Mukundapuram
Party	Candidate	Votes	%	±%
INC	A. C. Jose	347,945	46.71	
CPI(M)	P. Govindappillai	338,996	45.50	
BJP	P. D. Purushothaman Master	54,479	7.31	
BSP	Appu Kuttippatt	1,520	0.20	
SS	Babu Manjapra	1,406	0.19	
IND	Tony Pananchikkal	635	0.09	
Majority		8,949	1.21	
Turnout		752,317	72.73	
INC hold		Swing		

=== 1996 ===
1996 Indian general election: Mukundapuram
Party	Candidate	Votes	%	±%
INC	P. C. Chacko	349,801	47.81	
CPI(M)	V. Viswanatha Menon	325,044	44.43	
BJP	Narayana Iyer	35,227	4.81	
IND	Thomas Parokkaran	10,208	1.40	
IND	Prof. Abdul Khayyum Punnilath	6,888	0.94	
IND	Kunjukuttan Kodinjilli	3,335	0.46	
IND	Prince Thekkan	1,163	0.16	
Majority		24,757	3.38	
Turnout		749,439	74.61	
INC hold		Swing		

=== 1991 ===
1991 Indian general election: Mukundapuram
Party	Candidate	Votes	%	±%
INC	Savithri Lakshmanan	362,029	48.32	
CPI(M)	A. P. Kurian	349,664	46.67	
BJP	K. V. Sreedharan Master	30,776	4.11	
IND	V. M. Ayoob	3,688	0.49	
IND	Tony Pananchikkal	1,652	0.22	
IND	Thoppil Rajappan	1,385	0.18	
Majority		12,365	1.65	
Turnout		757,831	77.74	
INC hold		Swing		

=== 1989 ===
1989 Indian general election: Mukundapuram
Party	Candidate	Votes	%	±%
INC	Savithri Lakshmanan	367,931	48.77	
CPI(M)	C. O. Poulose Master	349,177	46.28	
BJP	K. K. Gangadharan Master	28,781	3.81	
JP	Dharmapalan Nair S.	2,530	0.34	
IND	Baby Poulose M. M.	1,627	0.22	
IND	M. R. Sathiadevan	1,304	0.17	
IND	K. K. Rajan	1,171	0.16	
IND	P. K. Ashokan	537	0.07	
IND	N. Subramanian	511	0.07	
IND	Thoppil Rajappan	492	0.07	
IND	M. N. Ramakrishnan Parathodu	399	0.05	
Majority		18,754	2.49	
Turnout		759,285	82.42	
INC gain from KC(J)		Swing		

=== 1984 ===
1984 Indian general election: Mukundapuram
Party	Candidate	Votes	%	±%
KC(J)	K. Mohandas	290,594	51.44	
CPI(M)	M. M. Lawrence	246,209	43.59	
IND	V. Balakrishnan	20,234	3.58	
IND	Garvasts Areekkal	2,989	0.53	
IND	P. T. Johny	2,566	0.45	
IND	Davy Eazhekkadan	1,463	0.26	
IND	Joseph Antony Ukken	811	0.14	
Majority		44,385	7.85	
Turnout		569,192	80.96	
KC(J) gain from CPI(M)		Swing		

=== 1980 ===
1980 Indian general election: Mukundapuram
Party	Candidate	Votes	%	±%
CPI(M)	Balanandan	227,235	56.73	
IND	C. G. Kumaran	162,104	40.47	
IND	K. V. Francis	7,374	1.84	
IND	K. L. Thimothy	2,054	0.51	
IND	Marry Varghese	1,759	0.44	
Majority		65,131	16.26	
Turnout		404,796	63.79	
CPI(M) gain from INC		Swing		

=== 1977 ===
1977 Indian general election: Mukundapuram
Party	Candidate	Votes	%	±%
INC	A. C. George	225,095	48.53	
IND	S. C. S. Menon	220,875	47.62	
IND	C. K. Balkrishnan	12,583	2.71	
IND	Varkey Master	3,820	0.82	
IND	V. Raghava Pillai	1,476	0.32	
Majority		4,220	0.91	
Turnout		472,364	84.04	
INC hold		Swing		

=== 1971 ===
1971 Indian general election: Mukundapuram
Party	Candidate	Votes	%	±%
INC	A. C. George	215,636	58.08	
CPI(M)	C. O. Paul	143,026	38.52	
SSP	C. G. Janardhanan	12,624	3.40	
Majority		72,610	19.56	
Turnout		375,929	71.33	
INC hold		Swing		

=== 1967 ===
1967 Indian general election: Mukundapuram
Party	Candidate	Votes	%	±%
INC	P. G. Menon	175,778	49.75	
IND	C. G. Janardhanan	170,440	48.24	
IND	S. P. Luis	7,078	2.00	
Majority		5,338	1.51	
Turnout		368,349	81.63	
INC hold		Swing		

=== 1962 ===
1962 Indian general election: Mukundapuram
Party	Candidate	Votes	%	±%
INC	Govinda Menon Panampilli	195,038	54.10	
CPI	Narayankutty Menon Thekkechalil	156,587	43.44	
IND	E. P. Varghese	8,866	2.46	
Majority		38,451	10.66	
Turnout		367,449	80.35	
INC gain from CPI		Swing		

=== 1957 ===
1957 Indian general election: Mukundapuram
Party	Candidate	Votes	%	±%
CPI	Narayanankutty Menon	134,505	44.02	
INC	E. K. Madhavan	128,860	42.17	
PSP	Mathai Alunkal	34,117	11.17	
IND	Moothedan Varkey	8,087	2.65	
Majority		5,645	1.85	
Turnout		305,569	74.90	
CPI gain from INC		Swing		

=== 1952 ===
1952 Indian general election: Crangannur
Party	Candidate	Votes	%	±%
INC	K. T. Achyuthan	93,216	38.95	
IND	George Chadayammuri	71,608	29.92	
SOC	Devassy	38,090	15.92	
IND	Verkey Moothedan	27,452	11.47	
CP	Eprahim Moovamby	8,947	3.74	
Majority		21,608	9.03	
Turnout		239,313	68.72	
INC win (new seat)				

== See also ==
- Thrissur district
- Ernakulam district
- Mukundapuram (Lok Sabha constituency)
- Muvattupuzha (Lok Sabha constituency)
