= Left United Front =

Indian political party coalition

The Left United Front was a coalition of political parties in Kerala, India. The Left United Front was launched in March 2014, by the RMP, the SUCI-C and the MCPI(U). According to RMP state chairman T.L. Santhosh, the goal of the Left United Front is to fight "[...] against anti-people policies, corruption, communalism and murder politics of the existing fronts".

The front fielded M. Shajarkhan in the Thiruvananthapuram seat.
