= Peelipose Thomas =

Indian politician, politician, and social worker

LDF Parliament Constituency Candidate Ex Member of All India Congress Committee (AICC) EX Member of Kerala Pradesh Congress Committee (KPCC)

Personal details
- Party: CPM
- Spouse: Smt.Molly Thomas
- Children: 2

Peelipose Thomas is a politician, a lawyer and an active social worker in Pathanamthitta. He is the candidate of LDF in pathanamthitta parliament constituency. former AICC member and a former member of the State Planning Board. He is currently the chairman of KSFE.
