= K. P. Dhanapalan =

Indian politician (1950–2026)

Member of Parliament, Lok Sabha
- In office 2009–2014
- Succeeded by: Innocent
- Constituency: Chalakudy

Personal details
- Born: 14 April 1950 Ernakulam, Travancore-Cochin, India
- Died: 30 May 2026 (aged 76) Paravur, Kerala, India
- Party: Indian National Congress
- Spouse: Sumam Dhanapalan
- Children: Brijit, Milash

K. P. Dhanapalan (14 April 1950 – 30 May 2026) was an Indian politician from North Paravur Ernakulam. He was the Member of Parliament representing the Chalakudy Lok Sabha constituency in Kerala, India. He belonged to Indian National Congress. He was the District Congress Committee President for Ernakulam.

== Early life and education ==
Dhanapalan ventured into political arena as the activist of Kerala's largest student organization Kerala Students Union. He was the unit president of KSU, at SN High School North Paravur and went on to become Ernakulam District secretary of the organization.

He completed his pre University course from Sree Narayana Mangalam College, Maliankara and BSC Chemistry from Union Christian College, Aluva. He was also college union chairman of Union Christian College, Aluva.

== Political career ==
Dhanapalan served as Indian National Congress DCC President of Ernakulam, AICC Member, KPCC Member, Secretary and general secretary. He was the elected Member of Parliament in the 15th Lok Sabha representing Chalakudy Parliamentary Constituency.

== Death ==
Dhanapalan died on 30 May 2026, at the age of 76.

== Positions held ==
- IYC Paravur Town Mandalam President.
- IYC Paravur Assembly President.
- IYC Ernakulam District President.
- Councillor Paravur Municipality (10 years)
- IYC State Vice President.
- DCC Vice President.
- KPCC Secretary.
- Chairman, Milk Producers Welfare Board
- DCC President Ernakulam
- KPCC General Secretary
- Senate Member, Cochin University.
- 2009-2014 Elected to 15th Loksabha from Chalakudy Parliament Constituency.
- Pradesh Returning Officer for INC Election, Lakshadweep.
- KPCC Vice President.
