= C. N. Jayadevan =

Indian politician (born 1950)

Leader of the Communist party of India in the Lok Sabha
- In office 16 May 2014 – 23 May 2019
- Preceded by: Gurudas Dasgupta
- Succeeded by: K. Subbarayan

Former Member of parliament for Thrissur
- In office 16 May 2014 – 23 May 2019
- Preceded by: P. C. Chacko
- Succeeded by: T. N. Prathapan

Member of legislative assembly
- In office 1996–2001
- Preceded by: P. P. George
- Succeeded by: P. P. George
- Constituency: Ollur

Personal details
- Born: 24 May 1950 (age 76) Manaloor, Thrissur, Kerala
- Party: Communist Party of India
- Spouse: M.S.Remadevi
- Children: Deepak.C.J, Dinup.C.J
- Education: Sree Kerala Varma College, Thrissur

Chirukandath Narayanan Jayadevan is an Indian politician of the Communist Party of India (CPI) from Thrissur in Kerala. He is a former Member of Parliament who represented Thrissur. Jayadevan earlier served as Member of the Legislative Assembly (MLA) of Kerala from 1996 to 2001 representing Ollur.

== Biography ==
Jayadevan, son of Chirukandath Narayan and Poovathkadavil Lakshmi, was educated at St. Theresa's UP School and Manalur Government High School, Manalur Panchayath, Thrissur District. He studied at Guruvayur Sree Krishna College, Government Victoria College, Palakkad, and Sreekerala Varma College (Thrissur). His wife is MS Ramadevi. Their children are Deepak and Dinup (both engineers). Deepak is overseas. P.K. Gopalakrishnan, former Deputy Speaker of the Kerala Legislative Assembly and Communist leader of the Kerala Legislative Assembly, is the mother's brother. He entered politics through the student movement. During the period 1970–71, police arrested a protester. 18 days in jail. He gained political attention through the youth movement and became the district secretary of AIYF in 1976–79. He also served as the AIYF state president from 1982 to 1985. It was during this time that the AIYF led a popular struggle called "Job or Jail".He later served as the district Assistant secretary of the CPI from 1989 to 1997, From 1997 to 2002, and from 2008 to 2014 as CPI District Secretary. He was the district president of the All India Kisan Sabha from 1986 to 1988.

According to the party selected, he participated in two years of continuous study classes in GDR. He has attended study classes and conferences in Mongolia, USSR, and UAE. For the first time, he was elected as the Chairman of the Anthikad Block Development Council. From 1987 to 91, Jayadevan was elected to the first District Council from the Chazur Division. He also served as Vice President of the District Council in 1990–92. He became a member of the 10th Kerala Legislative Assembly in the 1996 general elections, defeating former Agriculture Minister PP George Master from the Ollur assembly.

Party political offices
Preceded by Gurudas Dasgupta	Leader of the Communist Party of India Party in the 16th Lok Sabha; 2014–2019	Succeeded by K. Subbarayan
