= P. C. Chacko =

Indian politician (born 1946)

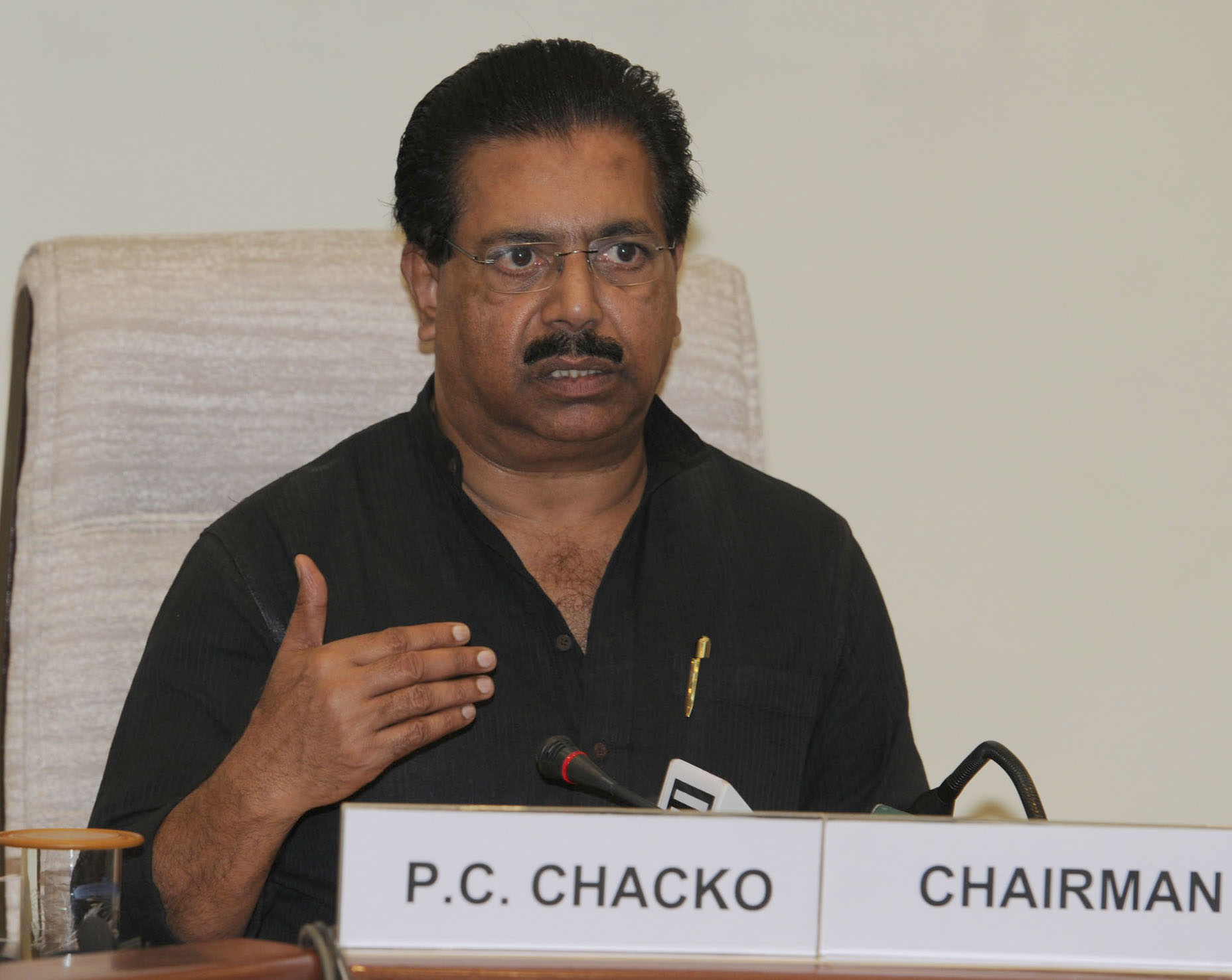

Kerala State President of Nationalist Congress Party (Sharadchandra Pawar)
- In office 7 February 2024 – 12 February 2025
- Preceded by: T. P. Peethambaran
- Succeeded by: Thomas K. Thomas

National Working President Nationalist Congress Party (SP)
- Incumbent
- Assumed office 1 June 2024
- National President NCP(SP): Sharad Pawar
- Preceded by: Position Established

Member of Parliament, Lok Sabha
- In office 16 May 2009 – 16 May 2014
- Preceded by: C. K. Chandrappan
- Succeeded by: C. N. Jayadevan
- Constituency: Thrissur

Personal details
- Born: 29 September 1946 (age 80) Kanjirappally, Kingdom of Travancore (present day Kottayam, Kerala, India)
- Party: Nationalist Congress Party
- Other political affiliations: Indian National Congress (Till 2021)
- Spouse: Leela Chacko
- Children: 2
- Parent(s): P. J. Chacko and Leyamma

P. C. Chacko (born 29 September 1946) is a former Member of Parliament from Thrissur Lok Sabha seat in Kerala. He is a former member of the Indian National Congress. Chacko resigned from Indian National Congress on 10 March 2021, stating that it had become difficult to be a congress leader in Kerala. P.C. Chacko is the first president of Thiruvananthapuram District committee of Kerala Students Union. He was the State president of Indian youth Congress from 1970 to 1973 and held the post of national General secretary of Indian youth Congress during 1973 - 1975. He became the general secretary of KPCC in 1975 and continued till 1979. He was elected to the Kerala Assembly in 1980 from Piravom constituency and during 1980- 81 he served as Minister for Industries in the state cabinet. He was elected to Loksabha in 1991 from Thrissur, in 1996 from Mukundapuram, in 1998 from Idukki and in 2009 again from Thrissur. On 16 March 2021 he joined Nationalist Congress Party, which is an ally of LDF in Kerala. He was appointed President of the Kerala State Unit of Nationalist Congress Party by the National President Sri. Sharad Pawar on 19 May 2021.

== Biography ==
Chacko graduated from Mar Ivanios College and University College, Kerala University. He entered politics through the Kerala Students Union and held positions including the Indian Youth Congress state president. In 1980, he was elected to the Kerala Legislative Assembly from the Piravam constituency and became Minister for Industries in the E. K. Nayanar government. He was chairman of the joint parliamentary committee to probe the alleged scam in the grant of 2G spectrum and telecom licenses from 1998 to 2009, and was the official spokesperson of the All India Congress Committee.

The Bharatiya Janata Party accused Chacko of altering the joint parliamentary committee report on 2G case and the Congress government steamrolling the report for covering corruption. BJP also expressed similar disappointment over Lok Sabha Speaker Meira Kumar's denial of permission to BJP leaders to protest against the report.

In the Lok Sabha general elections of 2014, Chacko sought to be elected from the Chalakudy constituency under the Indian National Congress ticket. However, he was defeated by cine artist Innocent.
