= 1989 Indian general election in Kerala =

Indian general election held to elect 20 members

1989 Indian general election
- November 1989

20 seats
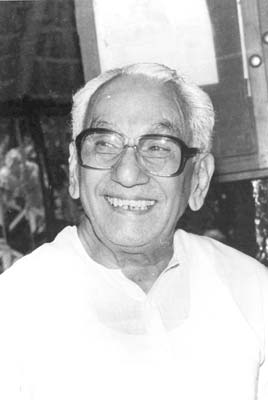

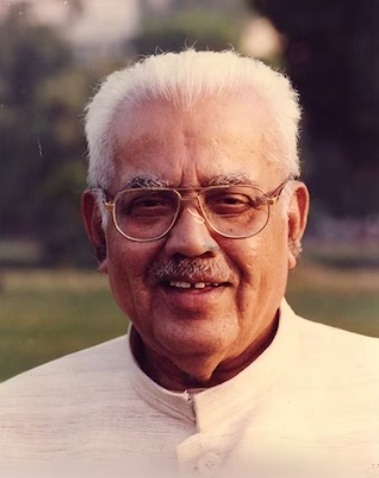
	First party	Second party
Leader	K. Karunakaran	E. K. Nayanar
Party	INC	CPI(M)
Alliance	UDF	LDF
Leader's seat	-	-
Last election	18	2
Seats won	17	3
Seat change	▼1	▲1
Percentage	49.29%	42.93%
Prime Minister before election
Rajiv Gandhi
INC
Prime Minister after election
Vishwanath Pratap Singh
JD

The 1989 Indian general election were held to elect 20 members to the ninth Lok Sabha from Kerala. Indian National Congress (INC)-led United Democratic Front (UDF) won 17 seats while Left Democratic Front (LDF), led by Communist Party of India (Marxist) (CPI(M)) won the remaining 3 seats. Turnout for the election was at 79.30% In the Lok Sabha, INC won plurality of seats, however Janata Dal (JD), led by V. P. Singh formed the government, albeit a short-lived one, with support from BJP and CPI(M).

== Alliances and parties ==
UDF is a Kerala legislative alliance formed by INC veteran K. Karunakaran. LDF comprises primarily of CPI(M) and the CPI, forming the Left Front in the national level. Bharatiya Janata Party (BJP) contested in 19 seats.

=== United Democratic Front ===
No.	Party	Election Symbol	Seats contested
1.	Indian National Congress		17
2.	Indian Union Muslim League		2
3.	Kerala Congress (M)		1

=== Left Democratic Front ===
No.	Party	Election Symbol	Seats contested
1.	Communist Party of India (Marxist)	Key	10
2.	Communist Party of India	Star	3
3.	Indian Congress (Socialist) - Sarat Chandra Singha		1
4.	Independents		3
5.	Janata Dal		1
6.	Revolutionary Socialist Party		1
7.	Kerala Congress		1

=== Bharatiya Janata Party ===
No.	Party	Election Symbol	Seats contested
1.	Bharatiya Janata Party		19

== List of Candidates ==
Constituency		UDF		LDF		BJP	
#	Name	Party	Candidate	Party	Candidate	Party	Candidate
1	Kasaragod	INC	I. Rama Rai	CPM	Ramanna Rai	BJP	C. K. Padmanabhan
2	Cannanore	INC	M. Ramachandran	CPM	P. Sasi	BJP	Palliyara Raman
3	Badagara	INC	A. Sujanapal	ICS	K. P. Unnikrishnan	BJP	P. K. Krishnadas
4	Calicut	INC	K. Muraleedharan	CPM	E. K. Imbichibava	BJP	P. S. Sreedharan Pillai
5	Manjeri	IUML	Ebrahim Sulaiman Sait	IND	K. V. Salahuddin	BJP	Ahalya Sankar
6	Ponnani	IUML	G. M. Banatwala	CPI	M. Rahmathulia	BJP	Janachandran Master
7	Palghat	INC	V. S. Vijayaraghavan	CPM	A. Vijayaraghavan	BJP	T. Chandrasekharan
8	Ottapalam (SC)	INC	K. R. Narayanan	CPM	Lenin Rajendran	BJP	Lakshmanan
9	Trichur	INC	P. A. Antony	CPI	Meenakshi Thampan	BJP	K. V. Sreedharan Master
10	Mukundapuram	INC	Savithri Lakshmanan	CPM	C. O. Poulose Master	BJP	K. K. Gangadharan Master
11	Ernakulam	INC	K. V. Thomas	IND	P. S. Poti	BJP	A. N. Radhakrishnan
12	Muvattupuzha	KC(M)	P. C. Thomas	KEC	P. J. Joseph	BJP	P. J. Thomas
13	Kottayam	INC	Ramesh Chennithala	CPM	K. Suresh Kurup	BJP	Ettumanoor Radhakrishnan
14	Idukki	INC	Palai K. M. Mathew	CPM	M. C. Josephine	BJP	M. N. Jayachandran
15	Alleppey	INC	V. Purushothaman	CPM	K. V. Devadas	BJP	K. D. Ramakrishnan
16	Mavelikara	INC	P. J. Kurien	JD	Thampan Thomas	BJP	Prathapachandra Verma
17	Adoor (SC)	INC	Kodikunnil Suresh	CPI	N. Rajan	BJP	E. K. Sasidharan
18	Quilon	INC	S. Krishna Kumar	RSP	Babu Divakaran	BJP	P. K. S. Rajeev
19	Chirayinkil	INC	Thalekunnil Basheer	CPM	Susheela Gopalan	BJP	V. N. Gopalakrishnan Nair
20	Trivandrum	INC	A. Charles	IND	O. N. V. Kurup	BJP	P. Asok Kumar

== List of elected MPs ==
No.	Constituency	Name of Elected M.P.	Party affiliation
1	Kasaragod	Ramanna Rai	CPI(M)
2	Kannur	Mullappally Ramachandran	INC
3	Vatakara	K. P. Unnikrishnan	ICS(SCS)
4	Kozhikode	K. Muraleedharan	INC
5	Manjeri	G.M. Banatwalia	IUML
6	Ponnani	Ebrahim Sulaiman Sait	IUML
7	Palakkad	A. Vijayaraghavan	CPI(M)
8	Ottapalam	K. R. Narayanan	INC
9	Thrissur	P. A. Antony	INC
10	Mukundapuram	Savitri Lakshmanan	INC
11	Ernakulam	K. V. Thomas	INC
12	Muvattupuzha	P. C. Thomas	KC(M)
13	Kottayam	Ramesh Chennithala	INC
14	Idukki	K. M. Mathew	INC
15	Alappuzha	Vakkom Purushothaman	INC
16	Mavelikkara	P. J. Kurien	INC
17	Adoor	Kodikunnil Suresh	INC
18	Kollam	S. Krishna Kumar	INC
19	Chirayankil	Thalekunnil Basheer	INC
20	Thiruvananthapuram	A. Charles	INC

== Results ==
=== Performance of political parties ===
Vote Share by alliance
1. UDF (49.3%)
2. LDF (42.9%)
3. BJP (4.51%)
4. Other (3.27%)

No.	Party	Political Front	Seats	Votes	%Votes	±pp
1	Indian National Congress	UDF	14	62,18,850	41.70%	▲8.43
2	Communist Party of India (Marxist)	LDF	2	34,11,227	22.87%	▲0.60
3	Communist Party of India	LDF	0	9,24,994	6.20%	▼1.17
4	Indian Union Muslim League	UDF	2	7,80,322	5.23%	▼0.06
5	Bharatiya Janata Party		0	6,72,613	4.51%	▲2.76
6	Indian Congress (Socialist) - Sarat Chandra Singha	LDF	1	3,70,434	2.48%	▼1.90
7	Revolutionary Socialist Party	LDF	0	3,59,393	2.41%	new
8	Kerala Congress (M)	UDF	1	3,52,191	2.36%	new
9	Janata Dal	LDF	0	2,77,682	1.86%	new
10	Kerala Congress	LDF	0	68,811	0.46%	▼1.91
11	Janata Party	none	0	38,492	0.26%	▲1.87
12	Bahujan Samaj Party	none	0	17,762	0.12%	new
13	Deseeya Karshaka Party	none	0	3,059	0.02%	new
14	Socialist Unity Centre of India	none	0	2,151	0.01%	new
Independents			0	14,14,560	9.49%	▲2.40

=== By constituency ===
No.	Constituency	UDF candidate	Votes	%	Party	LDF candidate	Votes	%	Party	BJP / Other candidate	Votes	%	Party	Winning alliance	Margin
1	Kasaragod	I. Rama Rai	3,57,177	44.5%	INC	M. Rammana Rai	3,58,723	44.7%	CPI(M)	C. K. Padmanabhan	69,419	8.6%	BJP	LDF	1,546
2	Kannur	Mullappally Ramachandran	3,91,042	50.1%	INC	P. Sasi	3,48,638	44.6%	CPI(M)	Palliyara Raman	31,266	4.0%	BJP	UDF	42,404
3	Vatakara	A. Sujanapal	3,62,225	45.5%	INC	K. P. Unnikrishnan	3,70,434	46.5%	ICS(SCS)	P. K. Krishnadas	45,558	5.7%	BJP	LDF	8,209
4	Kozhikode	K. Muraleedharan	3,77,858	47.9%	INC	E. K. Imbichibava	3,48,901	44.3%	CPI(M)	P. S. Sreedharan Pillai	49,696	6.3%	BJP	UDF	28,957
5	Manjeri	Ebrahim Sulaiman Sait	4,01,975	49.6%	IUML	K. V. Salahuddin	3,31,693	40.9%	IND	Ahalya Sankar	51,634	7.0%	BJP	UDF	70,282
6	Ponnani	G. M. Banatwalia	3,78,347	53.2%	IUML	M. Rahmathulia	2,70,828	38.1%	CPI	K. Janachandran	48,892	6.9%	BJP	UDF	1,07,519
7	Palakkad	V. S. Vijayaraghavan	3,47,115	46.8%	INC	A. Vijayaraghavan	3,48,401	47.0%	CPI(M)	T. Chandrasekharan	27,220	3.7%	BJP	LDF	1,286
8	Ottapalam	K. R. Narayanan	3,50,683	48.5%	INC	Lenin Rajendran	3,24,496	44.9%	CPI(M)	Lakshmanan	32,892	4.5%	BJP	UDF	26,187
9	Thrissur	P. A. Antony	3,38,271	47.0%	INC	Meenakshi Thampan	3,32,036	46.2%	CPI	K. V. Sreedharan	38,205	5.3%	BJP	UDF	6,235
10	Mukundapuram	Savithri Lakshmanan	3,67,931	48.5%	INC	C. O. Poulose	3,49,177	46.0%	CPI(M)	K. K. Gangadharan	28,781	3.8%	BJP	UDF	18,754
11	Ernakulam	K. V. Thomas	3,85,176	49.6%	INC	P. Subramnoian Poti	3,48,711	44.9%	IND	A. N. Radhakrishnan	29,162	3.8%	BJP	UDF	36,465
12	Muvattupuzha	P. C. Thomas	3,52,191	48.1%	KC(M)	P. J. Joseph	68,811	9.4%	KEC	C. Poulose	2,83,380	38.7%	IND	UDF	68,811
13	Kottayam	Ramesh Chennithala	3,84,809	51.1%	INC	K. Suresh Kurup	3,31,276	44.0%	CPI(M)	Ettumanoor Radhakrishnan	18,449	2.5%	BJP	UDF	53,533
14	Idukki	K. M. Mathew	3,98,516	53.4%	INC	M. C. Josephine	3,07,037	41.1%	CPI(M)	M. N. Jayachandran	25,354	3.4%	BJP	UDF	91,479
15	Alappuzha	Vakkom Purushotham	3,75,763	50.0%	INC	K. V. Devadas	3,50,640	46.7%	CPI(M)	K. D. Ramakrishnan	15,127	2.0%	BJP	UDF	25,123
16	Mavelikkara	P. J. Kurian	3,34,864	50.9%	INC	Thampan Thomas	2,77,682	42.2%	JD	Prathapachandra Verma	30,229	4.6%	BJP	UDF	57,182
17	Adoor	Kodikunnil Suresh	3,43,672	49.6%	INC	N. Rajan	3,22,130	46.5%	CPI	E. K. Sasidharan	17,123	2.5%	BJP	UDF	21,542
18	Kollam	S. Krishnakumar	3,86,855	49.9%	INC	Babu Divakaran	3,59,393	46.4%	RSP	P. K. S. Rajeev	16,202	2.1%	IND	UDF	27,462
19	Chirayinkil	Thalekunnil Basheer	3,49,068	47.8%	INC	Susheela Gopalan	3,43,938	47.1%	CPI(M)	V. N. Gopalakrishnan Nair	23,049	3.2%	BJP	UDF	5,130
20	Trivandrum	A. Charles	3,67,825	48.6%	INC	O. N. V. Kurup	3,16,912	41.9%	IND	P. Asok Kumar	56,046	7.4%	BJP	UDF	50,913

== See also ==
- Elections in Kerala
- Politics of Kerala
