= Political divisions of Kasaragod =

Coordinates: 12.5°N 75°E

Local bodies in Kasaragod district

Kasaragod district has four types of administrative hierarchies:

- Taluk and Village administration managed by the provincial government of Kerala
- Panchayath Administration managed by the local bodies
- Parliament Constituencies for the federal government of India
- Assembly Constituencies for the provincial government of Kerala

== Villages in Kasaragod District ==
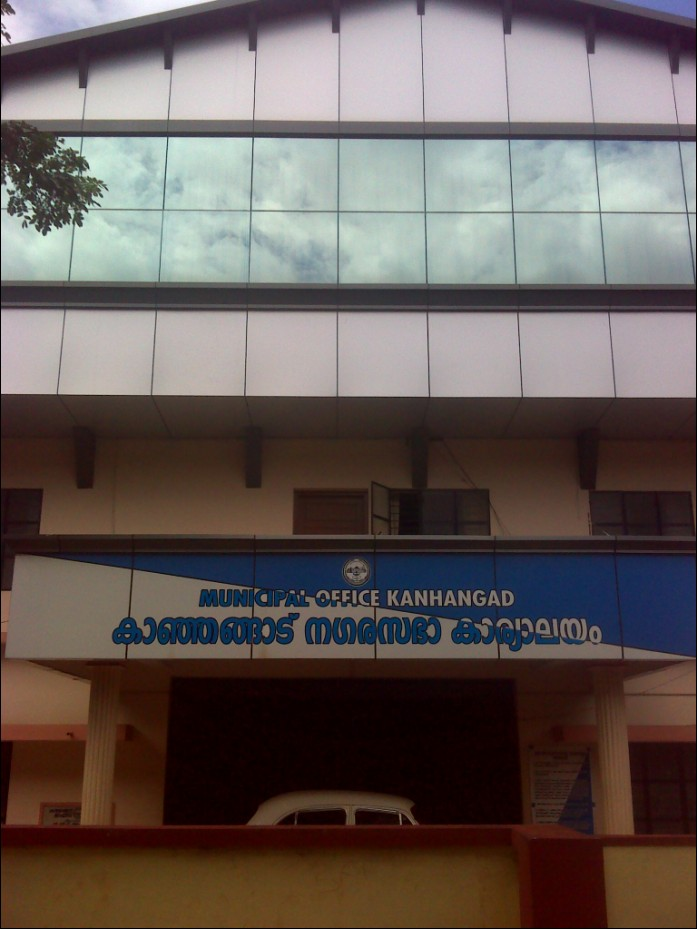
Kanhangad Municipal Office

=== Kasaragod Area ===
- Badiadka, Mogral Puthur, Madhur and Kumbadaje
- Bellur, Karadka, Chengala, Muliyar, Chemnad, Cheroor and Menangod.
- Bedadka, Kuttikkol, Uduma and Pullur-Periya

=== Kanhangad Area ===
- Ajanur, Kodom-Bellur, Madikai, Kinanoor-Karinthalam and Ballal
- West Eleri, East Eleri, Kallar, Parappa and Panathadi

=== Nileshwar Area ===
- Nileshwar, Kinavoor, Kayyur-Cheemeni and Trikaripur
- Padanna, Valiyaparamba and Pilikkode

=== Manjeshwar Area ===
- Vorkadi, Meenja, Paivalike and Enmakaje
- Mangalpadi, Kumbla and Puthige

== Kasaragod Parliament Constituency ==
Kasaragod is a Lok Sabha constituency in Kerala.

=== Assembly segments ===
Kasaragod Lok Sabha constituency is composed of the following assembly segments:

1. Manjeshwaram
2. Kasaragod
3. Udma
4. Kanhangad
5. Thrikaripur
6. Payyanur
7. Kalliasseri

=== Members of Parliament ===
- 1957: A.K. Gopalan, Communist Party of India
- 1962: A.K. Gopalan, Communist Party of India
- 1967: A.K. Gopalan, Communist Party of India (Marxist)
- 1971: Ramachandran Kadannappalli, Indian National Congress
- 1977: Ramachandran Kadannappalli, Indian National Congress
- 1980: Ramanna Rai, Communist Party of India (Marxist)
- 1984: I. Rama Rai, Indian National Congress (I)
- 1989: Ramanna Rai, Communist Party of India (Marxist)
- 1991: Ramanna Rai, Communist Party of India (Marxist)
- 1996: T. Govindan, Communist Party of India (Marxist)
- 1998: T. Govindan, Communist Party of India (Marxist)
- 1999: T. Govindan, Communist Party of India (Marxist)
- 2004: P. Karunakaran, Communist Party of India (Marxist)
- 2009: P. Karunakaran, Communist Party of India (Marxist)
- 2014: P. Karunakaran, Communist Party of India (Marxist)
- 2019: Rajmohan Unnithan, Indian National Congress
- 2024: Rajmohan Unnithan, Indian National Congress

=== Indian general election, 2024 ===
Left Democratic Front (LDF) fielded veteran Communist leader M. V. Balakrishnan from CPI(M) against Congress incumbent Rajmohan Unnithan in the Lok Sabha Elections 2024. M.L. Ashwini from BJP contested for NDA.

=== General Elections 2024 ===
2024 Indian general election: Kasaragod
| Party | Candidate | Votes | % | ±% |
|---|---|---|---|---|
| INC | Rajmohan Unnithan | 490,659 | 44.10 | +0.60 |
| CPI(M) | M. V. Balakrishnan | 3,90,010 | 35.06 | −4.75 |
| BJP | M. L. Ashwini | 2,19,558 | 19.73 | +3.60 |
| NOTA | None of the above | 7,112 | 0.64 | |
| Majority | | 1,00,649 | 9.04 | +5.34 |
| Turnout | | 11,17,221 | 76.76 | |
| Registered electors | | | | |
| INC hold | | Swing | | |

== See also ==
- Indian general election, 2014 (Kerala)
- Kasaragod district
- List of constituencies of the Lok Sabha
