= 1984 Indian general election in Kerala =

1984 Indian general election
- December 1984

20 seats
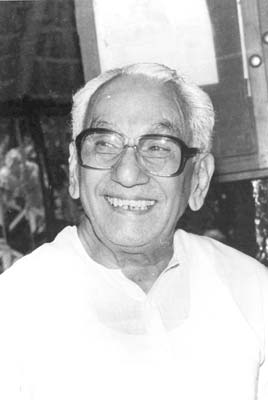

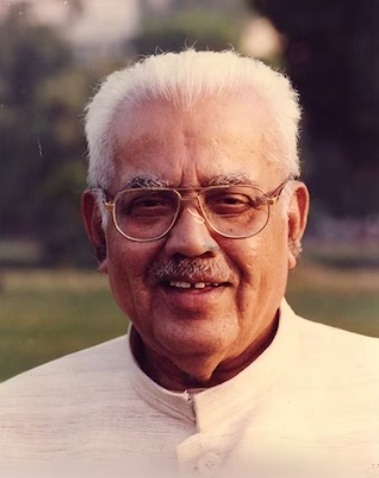
	First party	Second party
Leader	K. Karunakaran	E. K. Nayanar
Party	INC	CPI(M)
Alliance	UDF	LDF
Leader's seat	-	-
Last election	8	12
Seats won	18	2
Seat change	▲10	▼10
Percentage	51.91%	42.24%
Prime Minister before election
Rajiv Gandhi
INC
Prime Minister after election
Rajiv Gandhi
INC

The 1984 Indian general election were held to elect 20 members to the eighth Lok Sabha from Kerala. Indian National Congress (INC)-led United Democratic Front (UDF) won 18 seats while Left Democratic Front (LDF), led by Communist Party of India (Marxist) (CPI(M)) won just 2 seats. Turnout for the election was at 77.12% In the Lok Sabha, INC won by a landslide and its leader Rajiv Gandhi went on to become the Prime Minister of India.

== Alliances and parties ==
UDF is a Kerala legislative alliance formed by INC veteran K. Karunakaran. LDF comprises primarily of CPI(M) and the CPI, forming the Left Front in the national level. Bharatiya Janata Party (BJP) contested in 5 seats.

=== United Democratic Front ===
No.	Party	Election Symbol	Seats contested
1.	Indian National Congress		13
2.	Indian Union Muslim League		2
3.	Kerala Congress (Jacob)		2
4.	Janata Party		1
5.	Independent		1
6.	Kerala Congress		1

=== Left Democratic Front ===
No.	Party	Election Symbol	Seats contested
1.	Communist Party of India (Marxist)	Key	10
2.	Indian Congress (Socialist)		2
3.	Communist Party of India	Star	4
4.	Independents		2
5.	Lok Dal		1
6.	All India Muslim League		1

== List of Candidates from UDF and LDF ==
Constituency		UDF		LDF	
No.	Name	Party	Candidate	Party	Candidate
1	Kasaragod	INC	I. Rama Rai	CPI(M)	Balanandan
2	Cannanore	INC	Muliappalli Ramachandran	CPI(M)	Pattiam Rajan
3	Badagara	Ind.	K. M. Radhakrishnan	IC(S)	K. P. Unnikrishnan
4	Calicut	INC	K. G. Adiyodi	AIML	Moideenkutty Haji (Bavae Haji)
5	Manjeri	IUML	Ebrahim Sulaman Sait	CPI(M)	E. K. Imbichi Bava
6	Ponnani	IUML	G. M. Banatwalla	CPI	Koladi Govindankutty
7	Palghat	INC	V. S. Vijayaraghavan	CPI(M)	T. Sivadasa Menon
8	Ottapalam (SC)	INC	K. R. Narayanan	CPI(M)	A. K. Balan
9	Trichur	INC	P. A. Antony	CPI	V. V. Raghavan
10	Mukundapuram	KC(J)	K. Mohandas	CPI(M)	M. M. Lawrence
11	Ernakulam	INC	K. V. Thomas	IC(S)	A. A. Kochunny Master
12	Muvattupuzha	KC(J)	George Joseph Mundakkal (Baby)	CPI(M)	P. P. Esthose
13	Kottayam	KEC	Skaria Thomas	CPI(M)	Suresh Kurup
14	Idukki	INC	P. J. Kurian	CPI	C. A. Kurian
15	Alleppey	INC	Vakkon Purushothaman	CPI(M)	Suseela Gopalan
16	Mavelikara	JP	Thampan Thomas	Ind.	T. N. Upendranatha Kurup
17	Adoor (SC)	INC	K. K. Kunhambu	CPI	P. K. Raghavan
18	Quilon	INC	S. Krishna Kumar	Ind.	R. S. Unni
19	Chirayinkil	INC	Thalekkunnil Basheer	CPI(M)	K. Sudhakaran
20	Trivandrum	INC	A. Charles	LKD	A. Neela Lohithadasan Nadar

== List of elected MPs ==
No.	Constituency	Name of Elected M.P.	Party affiliation
1	Kasaragod	I. Rama Rai	INC
2	Kannur	Mullappally Ramachandran	INC
3	Vatakara	K. P. Unnikrishnan	IC(S)
4	Kozhikode	K. G. Adiyodi	INC
5	Manjeri	Ebrahim Sulaiman Sait	IUML
6	Ponnani	G. M. Banatwala	IUML
7	Palakkad	V. S. Vijayaraghavan	INC
8	Ottapalam	K. R. Narayanan	INC
9	Thrissur	P. A. Antony	INC
10	Mukundapuram	K. Mohandas	KC(J)
11	Ernakulam	K. V. Thomas	INC
12	Muvattupuzha	George Joseph Mundakkal	KC(J)
13	Kottayam	K. Suresh Kurup	CPI(M)
14	Idukki	P. J. Kurien	INC
15	Alappuzha	Vakkom Purushothaman	INC
16	Mavelikkara	Thampan Thomas	JNP
17	Adoor	K. Kunhambu	INC
18	Kollam	S. Krishna Kumar	INC
19	Chirayankil	Thalekunnil Basheer	INC
20	Thiruvananthapuram	A. Charles	INC

== Results ==
=== Performance of political parties ===
Vote Share by alliance
1. UDF (51.9%)
2. LDF (42.2%)
3. Other (5.85%)

No.	Party	Political Front	Seats	Votes	%Votes	±pp
1	Indian National Congress	United Democratic Front (Kerala)	13	36,24,315	33.27%	▲6.95
2	Communist Party of India (Marxist)	LDF	1	24,25,965	22.27%	▲0.79
3	Communist Party of India	LDF	0	8,03,206	7.37%	▲3.24
4	Kerala Congress (J)	United Democratic Front (Kerala)	2	5,98,113	5.49%	new
5	Indian Union Muslim League	United Democratic Front (Kerala)	2	5,75,754	5.29%	▼0.27
6	Indian Congress (Socialist)	LDF	1	4,77,466	4.38%	new
7	Kerala Congress	United Democratic Front (Kerala)	0	2,58,591	2.37%	▼2.00
8	Janata Party	United Democratic Front (Kerala)	1	2,32,339	2.13%	▼4.57
9	All India Muslim League	LDF	0	2,24,155	2.06%	▼0.35
10	Bharatiya Janata Party	none	0	1,91,120	1.75%	new
11	Lok Dal	LDF	0	1,86,353	1.71%	new
Independents			0	12,95,634	11.89%	▲1.10

=== By constituency ===
No.	Constituency	UDF candidate	Votes	%	Party	LDF candidate	Votes	%	Party	BJP / Other candidate	Votes	%	Party	Winning alliance	Margin
1	Kasaragod	I. Rama Rai	2,62,904	45.1%	INC	Balanandan	2,51,535	43.2%	CPI(M)	K. G. Marar	59,021	10.1%	BJP	United Democratic Front (Kerala)	11,369
2	Kannur	Mullappally Ramachandran	2,88,791	50.9%	INC	Pattiam Rajan	2,63,738	46.4%	CPI(M)	Kuntimangalam Azeez	2,942	0.5%	IND	United Democratic Front (Kerala)	25,053
3	Vatakara	K. M. Radhakrishnan	2,59,437	44.5%	IND	K. P. Unnikrishnan	2,70,416	46.3%	IC(S)	A. D. Nair	33,781	5.8%	BJP	LDF	10,979
4	Kozhikode	K. G. Adiyodi	2,78,216	49.5%	INC	Moideenkutty Haji	2,24,155	39.9%	AIML	K. Madhavankutty	40,549	7.2%	IND	United Democratic Front (Kerala)	54,061
5	Manjeri	Ebrahim Sulaman Sait	2,87,538	50.4%	IUML	E. K. Imbichi Bava	2,16,363	37.9%	CPI(M)	O. Rajagopal	43,301	7.6%	BJP	United Democratic Front (Kerala)	71,175
6	Ponnani	G. M. Banatwalia	2,88,216	57.0%	IUML	Koladi Govindankutty	1,85,890	36.7%	CPI	K. T. M. Kutty Moulavi	13,290	2.6%	IND	United Democratic Front (Kerala)	1,02,326
7	Palakkad	V. S. Vijayaraghavan	2,87,170	50.9%	INC	T. Sivadasa Menon	2,49,017	44.2%	CPI(M)	Rohana Jayaram	11,092	2.0%	IND	United Democratic Front (Kerala)	38,153
8	Ottapalam	K. R. Narayanan	2,90,177	53.7%	INC	A. K. Balan	2,34,607	43.4%	CPI(M)	C. Aru	3,143	0.6%	IND	United Democratic Front (Kerala)	55,570
9	Thrissur	P. A. Antony	2,68,683	51.5%	INC	V. V. Raghavan	2,17,393	41.7%	CPI	M. Jayaprakash	22,487	4.3%	IND	United Democratic Front (Kerala)	51,290
10	Mukundapuram	K. Mohandas	290,594	51.1%	KC(J)	M. M. Lawrence	246,209	43.3%	CPI(M)	V. Balakrishnan	20,234	3.6%	IND	United Democratic Front (Kerala)	44,385
11	Ernakulam	K. V. Thomas	2,77,374	50.3%	INC	A. A. Kochunny	2,07,050	37.5%	IC(S)	P. R. Nambiar	29,893	5.4%	BJP	United Democratic Front (Kerala)	70,324
12	Muvattupuzha	George Joseph Mundakkal	307,519	58.3%	KC(J)	P. P. Esthose	199,319	37.8%	CPI(M)	Paul Chirakkarodu	9,186	1.7%	IND	United Democratic Front (Kerala)	1,08,200
13	Kottayam	Skaria Thomas	2,58,591	46.2%	KEC	K. Suresh Kurup	2,64,444	47.2%	CPI(M)	O. M. Mathew	26,040	4.7%	IND	LDF	5,853
14	Idukki	P. J. Kurian	3,08,056	56.9%	INC	C. A. Kurian	1,77,432	32.8%	CPI	Joseph Michael	44,472	8.2%	IND	United Democratic Front (Kerala)	1,30,624
15	Alappuzha	Vakkom Purushothaman	3,03,732	51.6%	INC	Susheela Gopalan	2,65,968	45.1%	CPI(M)	M. S. Prasanna	10,465	1.8%	IND	United Democratic Front (Kerala)	37,764
16	Mavelikkara	Thampan Thomas	2,32,339	46.2%	JND	T. N. Upendranatha Kurup	2,31,052	45.9%	IND	P. K. Vishnu Namboodiri	25,124	5.0%	BJP	United Democratic Front (Kerala)	1,287
17	Adoor	K. K. Kunhambu	2,73,463	53.6%	INC	P. K. Raghavan	2,22,491	43.6%	CPI	N. S. Bhaskaran	7,036	1.4%	IND	United Democratic Front (Kerala)	50,972
18	Kollam	S. Krishnakumar	2,79,728	49.4%	INC	R. S. Unni	2,59,371	45.8%	IND	C. Rajendran	14,358	2.5%	IND	United Democratic Front (Kerala)	20,357
19	Chirayinkil	Thalekunnil Basheer	2,66,230	50.1%	INC	K. Sudhakaran	2,34,765	44.2%	CPI(M)	Vattappara Das	10,870	2.0%	IND	United Democratic Front (Kerala)	31,465
20	Trivandrum	A. Charles	2,39,791	42.6%	INC	A. Neela Lohithadasan Nadar	1,86,353	33.1%	LKD	Kerala Verma	1,10,449	19.6%	IND	United Democratic Front (Kerala)	53,438

== See also ==
- Elections in Kerala
- Politics of Kerala
