= 1980 Indian general election in Kerala =

1980 Indian general election
- January 1980

20 seats
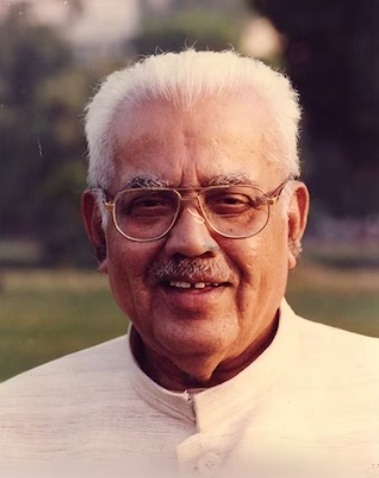

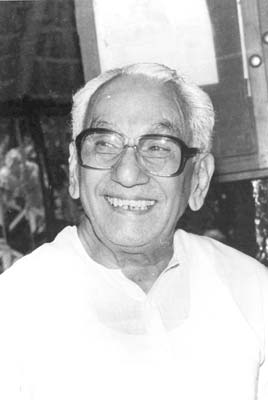
	First party	Second party
Leader	E. K. Nayanar	K. Karunakaran
Party	CPI(M)	INC
Alliance	LDF	UDF
Leader's seat	-	-
Last election	0	20
Seats won	12	8
Seat change	▲12	▼12
Prime Minister before election
Charan Singh
JP(S)
Prime Minister after election
Indira Gandhi
INC

The 1980 Parliamentary Election was a mid-term election held following the collapse of the Janata Party led governments led by Prime Ministers Morarji Desai and Charan Singh. It was also the first election that the Indian National Congress fought from the opposition. The party had suffered a split, with the faction led by former Prime Minister Indira Gandhi (Indian National Congress (Indira)) asserting its electoral popularity by winning 353 seats and forming a majority government of its own..

This was the first election fought in Kerala since the two coalitions, the Left Democratic Front (LDF) and the United Democratic Front (UDF) came into existence. These elections were held in the backdrop of growing political instability in Kerala. The previous Legislative Assembly (1977-79) had seen four Chief Ministers come to power- K. Karunakaran, A.K. Antony, P. K. Vasudevan Nair and C. H. Mohammed Koya, The Communist Party of India, the INC (U) and KC (Mani) split off from the United Front coalition led by the Indian National Congress to form the LDF, a coalition with the Communist Party of India (Marxist), the principle opposition party in Kerala. On the other hand, the INC (I) along with the Indian Union Muslim League, KC (Joseph) and the Janata Party formed the primary components of the UDF.

The LDF registered a comfortable victory over the UDF by winning 12 seats over the 8 seats bagged by the latter. In the assembly election held a fortnight later, the LDF came to power with senior CPI(M) leader E. K. Nayanar assuming the office of Chief Minister.

== Parties and alliances ==
=== Left Democratic Front ===
No.	Party	Election Symbol	Seats contested
1.	Communist Party of India (Marxist)	Key	8
2.	Indian National Congress (Urs)		6
3.	Communist Party of India	Star	2
4.	Kerala Congress		2
5.	Revolutionary Socialist Party		1
6.	All India Muslim League		1

=== United Democratic Front ===
No.	Party	Election Symbol	Seats contested
1.	Indian National Congress		11
2.	Indian Union Muslim League		2
3.	Janata Party		3
4.	Independent		4

== List of Candidates ==
Constituency					
Constituency		LDF		UDF	
1	Kasaragod	CPM	Ramanna Rai	JP	O. Rajagopal
2	Cannanore	INC(U)	Kandalottu Kunhambu	INC(I)	N. Ramakrishnan
3	Badagara	INC(U)	K. P. Unnikrishnan	INC(I)	Mullappally Ramachandran
4	Calicut	CPM	E. K. Imbichi Bava	JP	Arangil Sreedharan
5	Manjeri	AIML	K. Moideenkutty Haji	IUML	Ebrahim Sulaiman Sait
6	Ponnani	INC(U)	Aryadan Muhammed	IUML	G. M. Banatwala
7	Palghat	CPM	T. Sivadasa Menon	INC(I)	V. S. Vijaya Raghavan
8	Ottapalam (SC)	CPM	A. K. Balan	INC(I)	Vella Eacharan
9	Trichur	CPM	K. A. Rajan	INC(I)	P. P. George
10	Mukundapuram	CPM	E. Balanandan	IND	C. G. Kumaran
11	Ernakulam	INC(U)	Henry Austin	INC(I)	Xavier Varghese Arakal
12	Muvattupuzha	KEC	George J. Mathew	IND	George J. Baby
13	Kottayam	KEC	Skaria Thomas	INC(I)	K. M. Chandy
14	Idukki	CPM	M. M. Lawrence	IND	T. S. John
15	Alleppey	CPM	Susheela Gopalan	JP	Omana Pillai
16	Mavelikara	INC(U)	P. J. Kurien	IND	Thevally Madhavan Pillai
17	Adoor (SC)	CPI	P. K. Kodiyan	INC(I)	R. Achuthan
18	Quilon	RSP	N. Sreekantan Nair	INC(I)	B. K. Nair
19	Chirayinkil	INC(U)	Vayalar Ravi	INC(I)	A. A. Rahim
20	Trivandrum	CPI	M. N. Govindan Nair	INC(I)	Neelalohithadasan Nadar

== Results ==
No.	Party	Seats won	Seats contested	Votes	Voteshare
Left Democratic Front (LDF)
1	Communist Party of India (Marxist)	7	8	17,54,387	21.5%
2	Indian National Congress (Urs)	3	6	12,94,480	15.8%
3	Communist Party of India	1	2	3,37,194	4.1%
4	Kerala Congress	1	2	3,56,997	4.4%
5	All India Muslim League	0	1	1,96,820	2.4%
6	Revolutionary Socialist Party	0	1	1,85,562	2.3%
Total	LDF	12	20	41,25,440	50.5%
United Democratic Front (UDF)
1	Indian National Congress (Indira)	5	11	21,50,186	26.3%
2	Indian Union Muslim League	2	2	4,54,235	5.6%
3	Independents-	1	4	6,76,164	8.2%
4	Janata Party	0	3	5,22,321	6.3%
Total	UDF	8	20	38,02,906	46.4%

Vote Share by alliance
1. LDF (50.5%)
2. UDF (46.4%)
3. Other (3.10%)

=== Constituency Wise ===
Constituency		Winner				Runner Up				Margin	%
#	Name	Candidate	Party	Votes	%	Candidate	Party	Votes	%	Margin	%
1	Kasaragod	M. Ramanna Rai	CPI(M)	263,673	56.95	O. Rajagopal	JNP	190,086	41.05	73,587	15.90
2	Cannanore	K. Kunhambu	INC(U)	257,812	57.70	N. Ramakrishnan	INC(I)	184,555	41.30	73,257	16.40
3	Badagara	K. P. Unnikrishnan	INC(U)	271,796	54.15	Mullappally Ramachandran	INC(I)	230,114	45.85	41,682	8.30
4	Calicut	E. K. Imbichi Bava	CPI(M)	226,940	53.65	Arangil Sreeedharan	JNP	186,245	44.03	40,695	9.62
5	Manjeri	Ebrahim Sait	IUML	231,401	53.61	K. Moideenkutty Haji	AIML	196,820	45.60	34,581	8.01
6	Ponnani	G. M. Banatwala	IUML	222,834	55.53	Ariadan Mohamed	INC(U)	171,971	42.86	50,863	12.67
7	Palghat	V. S. Vijaya Raghavan	INC(I)	204,355	49.86	T. Sivadasa Menon	CPI(M)	192,267	46.91	12,088	2.95
8	Ottapalam (SC)	A. K. Balan	CPI(M)	203,256	52.58	V. Eacharan	INC(I)	179,848	46.52	23,408	6.06
9	Trichur	K. A. Rajan	CPI(M)	195,343	51.04	P. P. George	INC(I)	152,192	39.77	43,151	11.27
10	Mukundapuram	Balanandan	CPI(M)	227,235	56.73	C. G. Kumaran	IND	162,104	40.47	65,131	16.26
11	Ernakulam	Xavier Varghese Arakal	INC(I)	189,225	48.02	Henry Austin	INC(U)	186,723	47.39	2,502	0.63
12	Muvattupuzha	George Joseph	IND	172,651	48.00	George J. Mathew	KEC	168,321	46.80	4,330	1.20
13	Kottayam	Skaria Thomas	KEC	188,676	49.50	K. M. Chandy	INC(I)	183,301	48.09	5,375	1.41
14	Idukki	M. M. Lawrence	CPI(M)	184,919	49.44	T. S. John	IND	177,886	47.56	7,033	1.88
15	Alleppey	Suseela Gopalana	CPI(M)	260,754	62.29	Omana Pillai	JNP	145,990	34.88	114,764	27.41
16	Mavelikara	P. J. Kurien	INC(U)	226,645	54.09	Thevally Madhavan Pillai	IND	163,523	39.03	63,122	15.06
17	Adoor (SC)	P. K. Kodiyan	CPI	170,433	53.04	R. Achuthan	INC(I)	145,034	45.13	25,399	7.91
18	Quilon	B. K. Nair	INC(I)	222,148	53.23	N. Sreekantan Nair	RSP	185,562	44.46	36,586	8.77
19	Chirayinkil	A. A. Rahim	INC(I)	185,596	48.01	Vayalar Ravi	INC(U)	179,533	46.45	6,063	1.56
20	Trivandrum	Neelalohithadasan	INC(I)	273,818	60.90	M. N. Govindan Nair	CPI	166,761	37.09	107,057	23.81
