= 1996 Indian general election in Kerala =

1996 Indian general election
- April–May 1996

20 seats
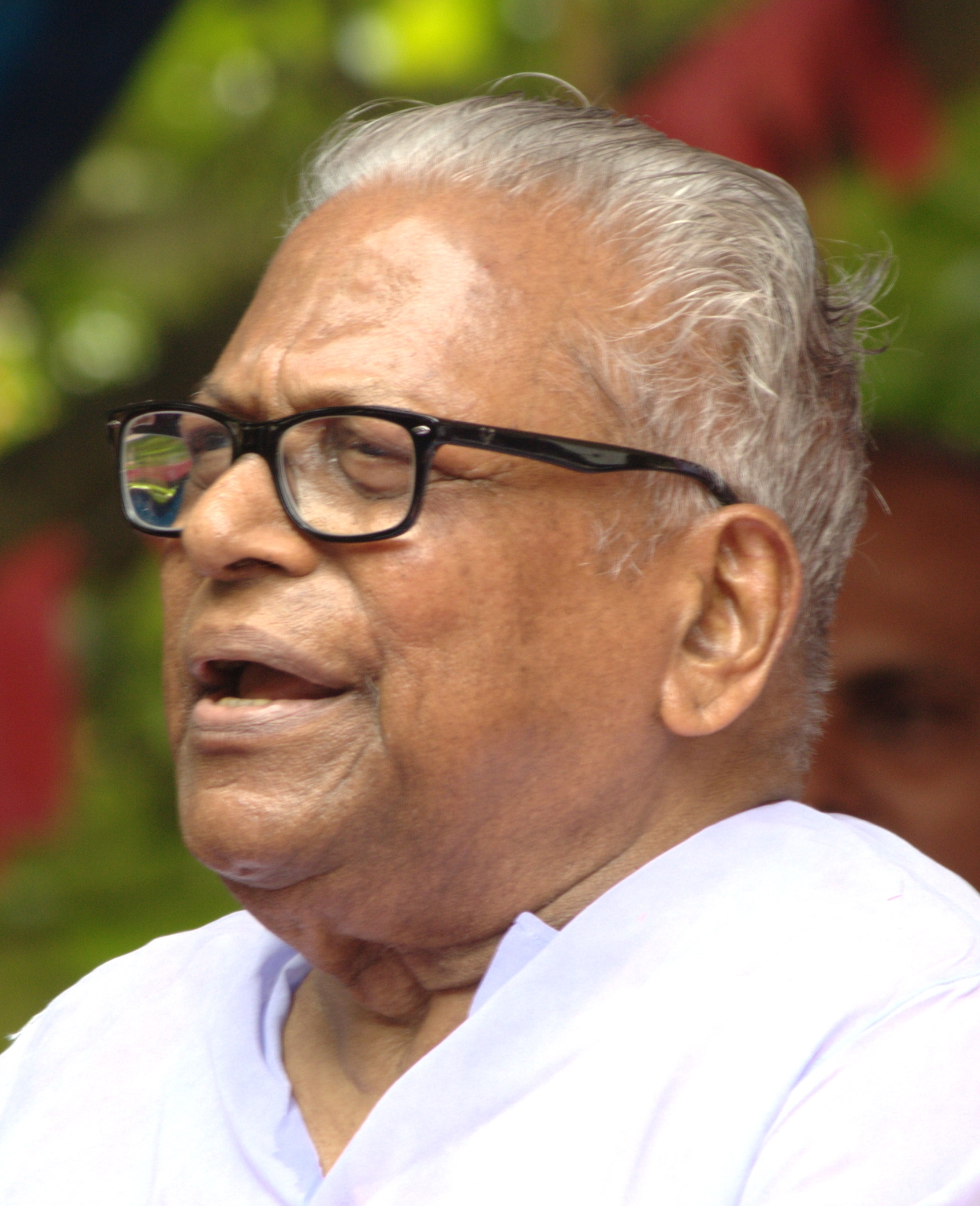

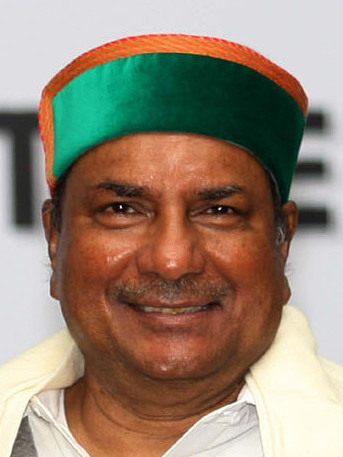
| | First party | Second party |
|---|---|---|
| Leader | V. S. Achuthanandan | A. K. Antony |
| Party | CPI(M) | INC |
| Alliance | LDF | UDF |
| Leader's seat | - | - |
| Last election | 4 | 16 |
| Seats won | 10 | 10 |
| Seat change | ▲6 | ▼6 |
| Percentage | 44.87% | 45.75% |
Prime Minister before election
P. V. Narasimha Rao
INC
Prime Minister after election
Atal Bihari Vajpayee
BJP

The 1996 Indian general election were held to elect 20 members to the eleventh Lok Sabha from Kerala. Both Indian National Congress (INC)-led United Democratic Front (UDF) and Left Democratic Front (LDF), led by Communist Party of India (Marxist) (CPI(M)) won 10 seats each. Turnout for the election was at 70.66%

== Alliances and parties ==
UDF is a Kerala legislative alliance formed by INC veteran K. Karunakaran. LDF comprises primarily of CPI(M) and the CPI, forming the Left Front in the national level. Bharatiya Janata Party (BJP) contested in 18 seats.

=== United Democratic Front ===
| No. | Party | Election Symbol | Seats Contested |
|---|---|---|---|
| 1. | Indian National Congress | | 17 |
| 2. | Indian Union Muslim League | | 2 |
| 3. | Kerala Congress (M) | | 1 |

=== Left Democratic Front ===
| No. | Party | Election Symbol | Seats Contested |
|---|---|---|---|
| 1. | Communist Party of India (Marxist) | Key | 9 |
| 2. | Communist Party of India | Star | 4 |
| 3. | Independents | | 3 |
| 4. | Janata Dal | | 2 |
| 5. | Revolutionary Socialist Party | | 1 |
| 6. | Kerala Congress | | 1 |

=== Bharatiya Janata Party ===
| No. | Party | Election Symbol | Seats Contested |
|---|---|---|---|
| 1. | Bharatiya Janata Party | | 18 |

== Constituency wise candidates ==
| Constituency | | UDF | | LDF | | BJP | |
| # | Name | Party | Candidate | Party | Candidate | Party | Candidate |
|---|---|---|---|---|---|---|---|
| 1 | Kasaragod | INC | I. Rama Rai | CPM | T. Govindan | BJP | P. K. Krishnadas |
| 2 | Cannanore | INC | M. Ramachandran | IC(S) | K. Ramachandran | BJP | M. K. Saseeindran |
| 3 | Badagara | INC | K. P. Unnikrishnan | CPM | O. Bharathan | BJP | A. D. Nair |
| 4 | Calicut | INC | K. Muraleedharan | JD | M. P. Veerendra Kumar | BJP | K. P. Sreesan |
| 5 | Manjeri | IUML | E. Ahamed | CPM | C. H. Ashiq | BJP | Cherukattu Vasudevan |
| 6 | Ponnani | IUML | G. M. Banatwala | CPI | Mokkath Rahmathulla | BJP | K. Janachandran M. |
| 7 | Palghat | INC | V. S. Vijayaraghavan | CPM | N. N. Krishnadas | BJP | M. V. Sukumaran |
| 8 | Ottapalam (SC) | INC | K. K. Vijayalakshmi | CPM | S. Ajayakumar | BJP | K. V. Kumaran |
| 9 | Trichur | INC | K. Karunakaran | CPI | V. V. Raghavan | BJP | Rema Reghunandan |
| 10 | Mukundapuram | INC | P. C. Chacko | CPM | V. Viswanatha Menon | BJP | Narayana Iyer |
| 11 | Ernakulam | INC | K. V. Thomas | IND | Xavier Arrakkal | BJP | O. M. Mathew |
| 12 | Muvattupuzha | KC(M) | P. C. Thomas | IND | Baby Kurien | BJP | George Kurian |
| 13 | Kottayam | INC | Ramesh Chennithala | JD | Jayalakshmi | | |
| 14 | Idukki | INC | A. C. Jose | KEC | K. Francis George | BJP | D. Asok Kumar |
| 15 | Alleppey | INC | V. M. Sudheeran | CPM | T. J. Anjalose | BJP | N. Unnikrishnan |
| 16 | Mavelikara | INC | P. J. Kurien | CPM | M. R. Gopalakrishnan | BJP | K. K. R. Kumar |
| 17 | Adoor (SC) | INC | Kodikkunnil Suresh | CPI | P. K. Raghavan | BJP | Kainakari Janardhanan |
| 18 | Quilon | INC | S. Krishna Kumar | RSP | N. K. Premachandran | | |
| 19 | Chirayinkil | INC | Thalekunnil Basheer | CPM | Anirudhan Sampath | BJP | R. Radhakrishnan U. |
| 20 | Trivandrum | INC | A. Charles | CPI | K. V. Surendranath | BJP | K. Raman Pillai |

== List of elected MPs ==
| No. | Constituency | Name of Elected M.P. | Party affiliation |
|---|---|---|---|
| 1 | Kasaragod | T. Govindan | CPI(M) |
| 2 | Kannur | Mullappally Ramachandran | INC |
| 3 | Vatakara | O. Bharathan | CPI(M) |
| 4 | Kozhikode | M. P. Veerendra Kumar | JD |
| 5 | Manjeri | E. Ahamed | IUML |
| 6 | Ponnani | G. M. Banatwala | IUML |
| 7 | Palakkad | N. N. Krishnadas | CPI(M) |
| 8 | Ottapalam | S. Ajaya Kumar | CPI(M) |
| 9 | Thrissur | V. V. Raghavan | CPI |
| 10 | Mukundapuram | P. C. Chacko | INC |
| 11 | Ernakulam | Xavier Arackal | IND |
| 12 | Muvattupuzha | P. C. Thomas | KC(M) |
| 13 | Kottayam | Ramesh Chennithala | INC |
| 14 | Idukki | A. C. Jose | INC |
| 15 | Alappuzha | V. M. Sudheeran | INC |
| 16 | Mavelikkara | P. J. Kurien | INC |
| 17 | Adoor | Kodikunnil Suresh | INC |
| 18 | Kollam | N. K. Premachandran | RSP |
| 19 | Chirayankil | A. Sampath | CPI(M) |
| 20 | Thiruvananthapuram | K. V. Surendranath | CPI |

== Results ==
=== Performance of political parties ===
Vote Share by alliance
1. UDF (45.8%)
2. LDF (44.9%)
3. BJP (5.61%)
4. Other (3.77%)

| No. | Party | Political Front | Seats | Votes | %Votes | ±pp |
|---|---|---|---|---|---|---|
| 1 | Indian National Congress | UDF | 7 | 54,67,132 | 38.01% | ▼0.76 |
| 2 | Communist Party of India (Marxist) | LDF | 5 | 30,44,369 | 21.16% | ▲0.45 |
| 3 | Communist Party of India | LDF | 2 | 11,82,944 | 8.22% | ▲0.10 |
| 4 | Bharatiya Janata Party | none | 0 | 8,07,607 | 5.61% | ▲1.00 |
| 5 | Indian Union Muslim League | UDF | 2 | 7,45,070 | 5.08% | ▲0.06 |
| 6 | Janata Dal | LDF | 1 | 6,33,104 | 4.40% | ▼0.11 |
| 7 | Kerala Congress (M) | UDF | 1 | 3,56,168 | 2.66% | ▼0.04 |
| 8 | Revolutionary Socialist Party | LDF | 1 | 3,59,786 | 2.50% | ▲0.09 |
| 9 | Indian Congress (Secular) | LDF | 0 | 3,32,622 | 2.31% | ▼0.39 |
| 10 | Kerala Congress | LDF | 0 | 3,20,539 | 2.23% | ▲0.01 |
| 11 | Peoples Democratic Party | none | 0 | 64,950 | 0.45% | new |
| 12 | Bahujan Samaj Party | none | 0 | 22,139 | 0.15% | ▼0.01 |
| 13 | Janata Party | none | 0 | 13,557 | 0.01% | ▼0.12 |
| 14 | All India Forward Bloc | none | 0 | 12,837 | 0.09% | new |
| 15 | Shiv Sena | none | 0 | 5,609 | 0.02% | new |
| 16 | Indian National League | none | 0 | 1,354 | 0.01% | new |
| 17 | Nagaland Peoples Party | none | 0 | 1,066 | 0.01% | new |
| 18 | Samata Party | none | 0 | 721 | 0.01% | new |
| Independents | | | 1 | 10,02,198 | 6.97% | ▼0.76 |

=== By constituency ===
| No. | Constituency | UDF candidate | Votes | % | Party | LDF candidate | Votes | % | Party | BJP / Other candidates | Votes | % | Party | Winning alliance | Margin |
|---|---|---|---|---|---|---|---|---|---|---|---|---|---|---|---|
| 1 | Kasaragod | I. Rama Rai | 2,97,267 | 36.6% | INC | T. Govindan | 371,997 | 45.8% | CPI(M) | P. K. Krishnadas | 97,577 | 12.0% | BJP | LDF | 74,730 |
| 2 | Kannur | Mullappally Ramachandran | 3,71,924 | 48.0% | INC | Kadannappalli Ramachandran | 3,32,622 | 42.9% | IC(S) | M. K. Saseeindran | 30,511 | 3.9% | BJP | UDF | 39,302 |
| 3 | Vatakara | K. P. Unnikrishnan | 3,35,950 | 40.7% | INC | O. Bharathan | 4,15,895 | 50.4% | CPI(M) | A. D. Nair | 49,971 | 6.1% | BJP | LDF | 79,945 |
| 4 | Kozhikode | K. Muraleedharan | 3,16,862 | 41.8% | INC | M. P. Veerendra Kumar | 3,55,565 | 46.9% | JD | K. P. Sreesan | 56,942 | 7.5% | BJP | LDF | 38,703 |
| 5 | Manjeri | E. Ahammed | 3,76,001 | 47.3% | IUML | C. H. Ashiq | 3,21,030 | 40.3% | CPI(M) | Cherukattu Vasudevan | 54,550 | 6.9% | BJP | UDF | 54,971 |
| 6 | Ponnani | G. M. Banatwalla | 3,54,808 | 48.4% | IUML | Mokkath Rahmathulla | 2,75,513 | 37.6% | CPI | K. Janachandran | 56,234 | 7.7% | BJP | UDF | 79,295 |
| 7 | Palakkad | V. S. Vijayaraghavan | 3,19,841 | 43.3% | INC | N. N. Krishnadas | 3,43,264 | 46.5% | CPI(M) | M. V. Sukumaran | 37,221 | 5.0% | BJP | LDF | 23,423 |
| 8 | Ottapalam | K. K. Vijayalakshmi | 3,00,958 | 43.3% | INC | S. Ajayakumar | 3,24,022 | 46.6% | CPI(M) | K. V. Kumaran | 49,296 | 7.1% | BJP | LDF | 23,064 |
| 9 | Thrissur | K. Karunakaran | 3,07,002 | 43.3% | INC | V. V. Raghavan | 3,08,482 | 43.6% | CPI | Rema Reghunandan | 41,139 | 5.8% | BJP | LDF | 1,480 |
| 10 | Mukundapuram | P. C.Chacko | 3,49,801 | 46.7% | INC | V. Viswanatha Menon | 3,25,044 | 43.4% | CPI(M) | Narayana Iyer | 35,227 | 4.7% | BJP | UDF | 24,757 |
| 11 | Ernakulam | K. V. Thomas | 3,05,094 | 41.8% | INC | Xavier Arrakkal | 3,35,479 | 46.0% | IND | O. M. Mathew | 46,559 | 6.4% | BJP | LDF | 30,385 |
| 12 | Muvattupuzha | P. C. Thomas | 3,82,319 | 53.1% | KC(M) | Baby Kurien | 2,60,423 | 36.2% | IND | Narayanan Namboothiri | 50,738 | 7.7% | BJP | UDF | 1,21,896 |
| 13 | Kottayam | Ramesh Chennithala | 3,30,447 | 45.9% | INC | Jayalakshmi | 2,77,539 | 39.6% | JD | A. K. Achary | 29,319 | 4.2% | IND | LDF | 67,048 |
| 14 | Idukki | A. C. Jose | 3,50,679 | 48.0% | INC | K. Francis George | 3,20,539 | 43.9% | KEC | D. Ashok Kumar | 32,107 | 4.4% | BJP | UDF | 30,140 |
| 15 | Alappuzha | V. M. Sudheeran | 3,69,539 | 48.7% | INC | T. J. Anjalose | 3,43,590 | 45.3% | CPI(M) | Nedumuthara Unnikrishnan | 17,990 | 2.4% | BJP | UDF | 25,949 |
| 16 | Mavelikkara | P. J. Kurien | 2,90,524 | 45.9% | INC | M. R. Gopalakrishnan | 2,69,448 | 42.5% | CPI(M) | K. K. R. Kumar | 45,325 | 7.2% | BJP | UDF | 21,076 |
| 17 | Adoor | Kodikkunnil Suresh | 3,51,872 | 51.6% | INC | P. K. Raghavan | 2,86,327 | 42.0% | CPI | Kainakari Janardhanan | 21,609 | 3.2% | BJP | UDF | 65,545 |
| 18 | Kollam | S. Krishnakumar | 2,81,416 | 38.1% | INC | N. K. Premachandran | 3,59,786 | 48.7% | RSP | Nina Rajan Pillai | 57,917 | 7.8% | IND | LDF | 78,370 |
| 19 | Chirayinkil | Thalekkunnil Basheer | 2,81,996 | 40.5% | INC | A. Sampath | 3,30,079 | 47.4% | CPI(M) | R. Radhakrishnan Unnithan | 30,348 | 4.4% | BJP | LDF | 48,083 |
| 20 | Trivandrum | A. Charles | 2,91,820 | 40.5% | INC | K. V. Surendranath | 3,12,622 | 43.4% | CPI | K. Raman Pillai | 74,904 | 10.4% | BJP | LDF | 20,802 |

== See also ==
- Elections in Kerala
- Politics of Kerala
