= Soordelu Hill Station =

- Hill Station
- Location within Kerala Location within India
- Coordinates: 12.645°N 75.132°E
- Country: India
- State: Kerala
- Elevation: 350 m (1,150 ft)

Languages
  - Official: Malayalam, Tulu, English
- Time zone: UTC+5:30 (IST)

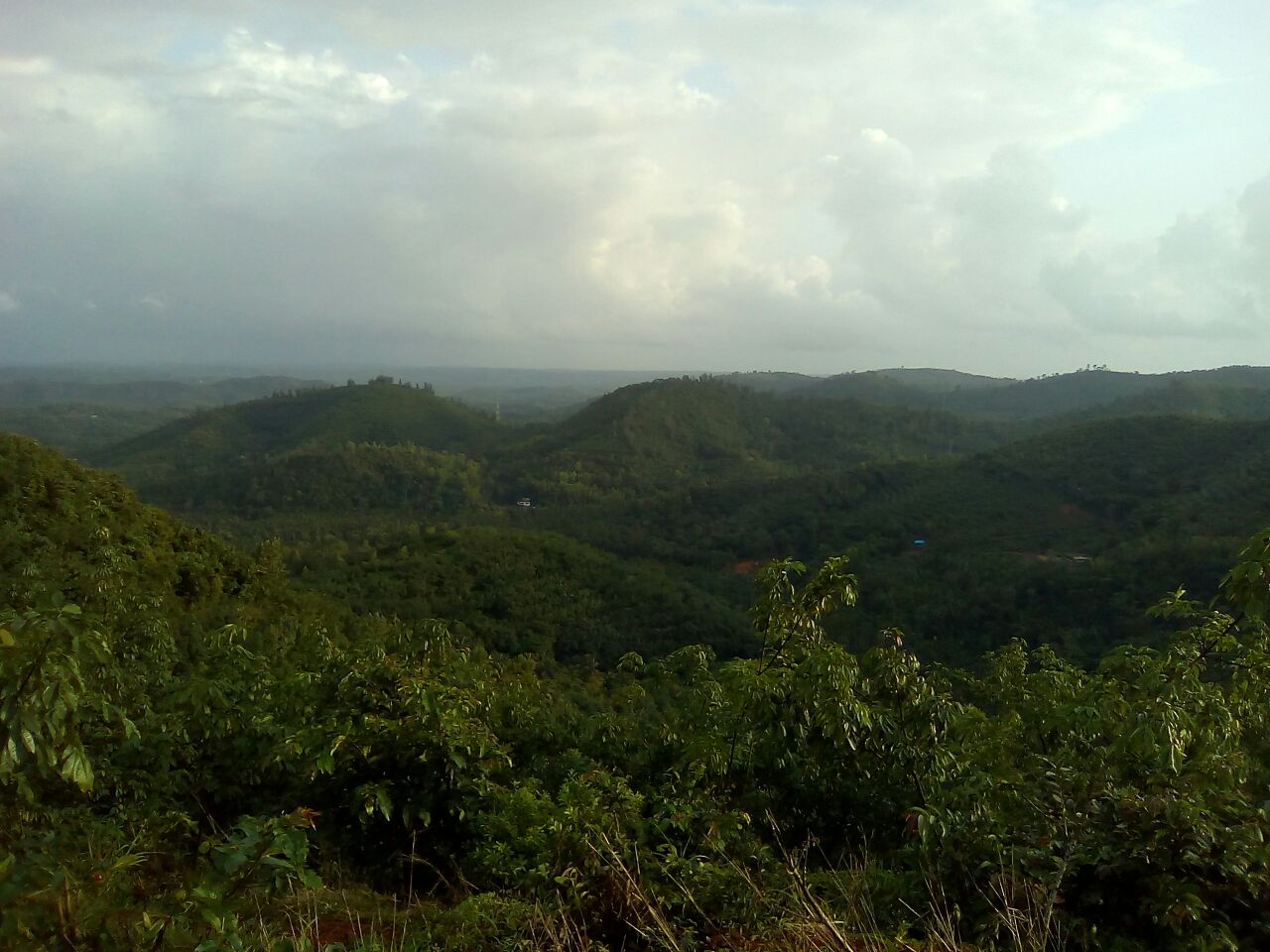
Soordelu Hill Station top

Soordelu Hill Station is a hill station in Kasaragod district of Kerala, India. It lies 250 to 300 metres above sea level. It has two approaches, an easier one from Soordelu Junction and a difficult one from Swarga.

Sri Subraya Temple Katukukke is the nearest temple to this place.

It is located 22 km north of the District headquarters in Kasaragod. It is 25 km from Manjeshwar and 593 km from state capital Thiruvananthapuram. It is surrounded by Kasargod Taluk (south), Manjeshwar Taluk (west), Bantval Taluk (north) and Suliya Taluk (east).

== Climate ==
The temperature remains, on an average, around 25 °C - 35 °C.

== Transportation ==
Local roads have access to National Highway No.66 which connects to Mangalore in the north and Calicut in the south. The nearest railway station is Manjeshwar on Mangalore-Palakkad line. There is an airport at Mangalore.

== Languages ==
This locality is an essentially multi-lingual region. The people speak Malayalam, Kannada, Tulu, Beary bashe and Konkani. Migrant workers also speak Hindi and Tamil languages.

== Administration ==
This village is part of Manjeswaram assembly constituency which is again part of Kasaragod (Lok Sabha constituency)

== Gallery ==
Photos related to Soordelu Hill Station

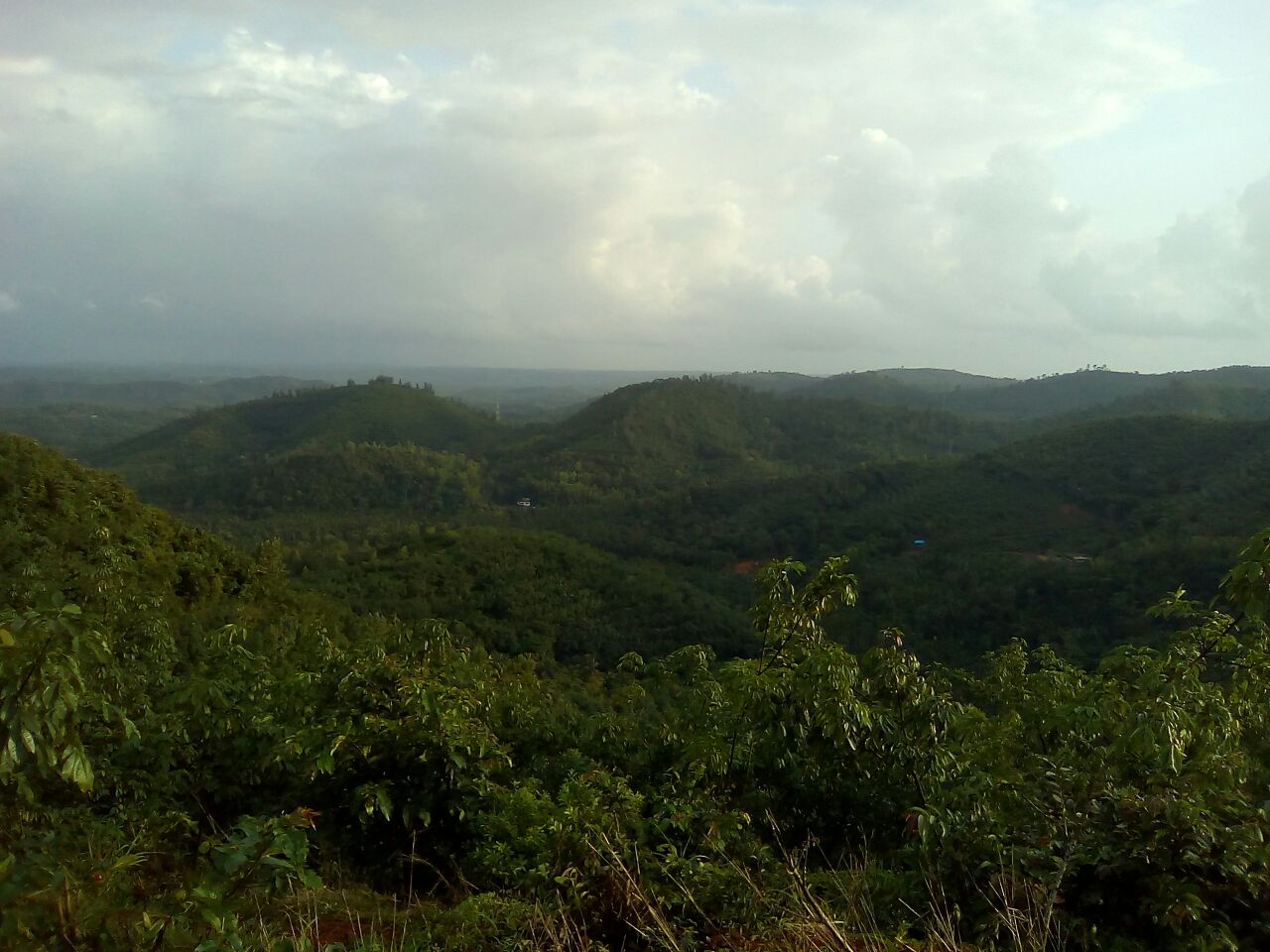
Soordelu Hill Station top
