= P. Karunakaran =

Indian politician

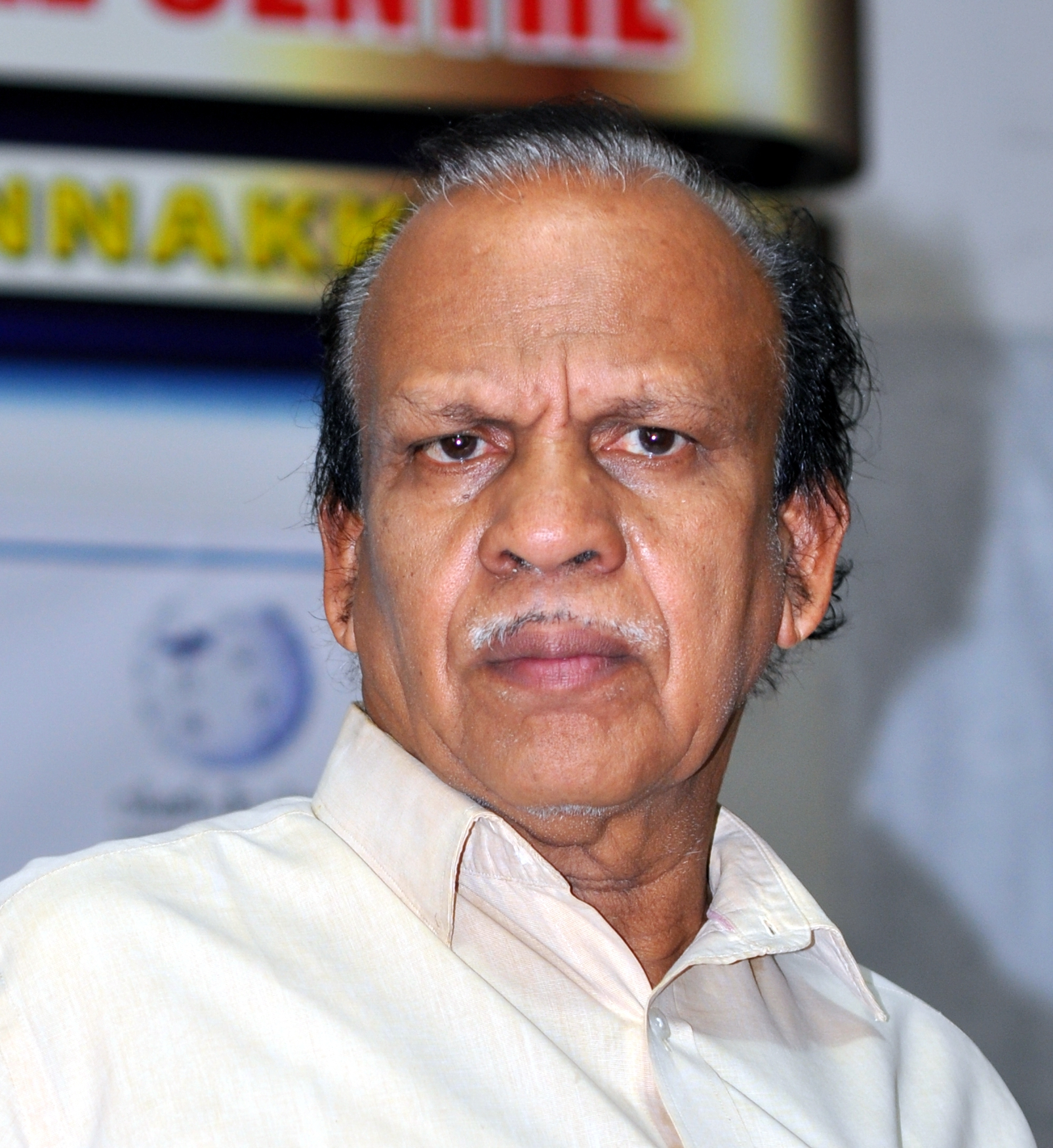

Member of Parliament, Lok Sabha
- In office 2 June 2004 – 17 June 2019
- Preceded by: T. Govindan
- Succeeded by: Rajmohan Unnithan
- Constituency: Kasaragod

Leader of Communist Party of India (Marxist) Parliamentary Party, Lok Sabha
- In office 2014 - 2019
- Preceded by: Basudev Acharia
- Succeeded by: P. R. Natarajan

Personal details
- Born: 20 April 1945 (age 81) Kasaragod, Madras Presidency, British India (now in Kerala, India)
- Party: Communist Party of India (Marxist)
- Spouse: Laila (m. 1978)
- Children: 1 daughter
- Parents: N. Koran (father); P. Chirutha (mother)
- Relatives: A. K. Gopalan (Father-in-law); Susheela Gopalan (Mother-in-law)

P. Karunakaran (born 20 April 1945) is an Indian communist politician and a member of the 16th Lok Sabha of India. He represented the Kasargod constituency of Kerala and is a member of the Communist Party of India (Marxist) (CPI(M)) political party. He was elected to Lok Sabha for the first time in 2004 general election. He won the second term in 2009 Lok Sabha election. He got 385,522 votes against 321,095 of the Congress(I) candidate. He was the leader of the Lok Sabha for CPI(M) in the 16th Loksabha.

His wife Laila, is daughter of the communist leader A. K. Gopalan and Susheela Gopalan. He holds an M.A degree from Kerala University.

== Books Published ==
- Memories of Vietnam
- Indian Politics - Inside and Outside Parliament
- Suppression and Resistance
- Indian Politics - Outside and Inside Parliament (Second Part)
- Olimangaroormakal

== See also ==
- Anirudhan Sampath
- P. K. Biju
- Mohammed Salim

Preceded by T. Govindan	Member of Parliament from Kasargod; 2004 - 2019	Succeeded by Rajmohan Unnithan

Preceded by Basudeb Acharia	Leader of the Communist Party of India (Marxist) Party in the Lok Sabha; 2014–2019	Succeeded by A. M. Ariff
