= K. P. Satheesh Chandran =

Indian politician

MLA
- In office 1996–2006
- Constituency: Trikaripur

Personal details
- Born: 23 November 1957 (age 68) Nileshwaram, Kerala, India
- Party: Communist Party of India (Marxist)

K. P. Satheesh Chandran is a political party leader of the Communist party of India, Marxist, (CPIM), in Kasargod, Kerala. He was contesting as the candidate for Kasargode constituency in the 2019 Indian general elections. Elected as MLA to Kerala Legislative assembly in 1996 and 2001, he holds B.A. in Economics and History. He entered politics through students federation of India. He was SFI Unit Secretary at Govt. College Madappally, was Joint Secretary (1984), Secretary (1985–91) and President (1991–94) of the DYFI, Kasargod District Committee, DYFI State Vice President and Central Executive Committee Member since 1991; Member CPI (M) Kasargod District Secretariat.

He was born to Shri. K.K. Govidan Nambiar and Smt. Kunju Lakshmi Amma at Pattena, Nileshwaram on 23 November 1957.
