= Rajmohan Unnithan =

Indian politician

K. Rajmohan Unnithan

Member of Parliament, Lok Sabha
- Incumbent
- Assumed office 23 May 2019
- Preceded by: P. Karunakaran
- Constituency: Kasaragod

Personal details
- Born: 10 June 1953 (age 73) Kilikollur, State of Travancore–Cochin (present day Kilikollur, Kollam, Kerala), India
- Party: Indian National Congress
- Spouse: S. Sutha Kumari
- Children: 3
- Education: Sree Narayana College, Kollam
- Profession: Politician; Film actor

Rajmohan Unnithan (born 10 June 1953) is an Indian politician turned film actor who is a member in the Lok Sabha representing Kasaragod constituency and a member of the Indian National Congress.

He was a spokesperson to the Kerala Pradesh Congress Committee (KPCC), the Kerala body of the Indian National Congress. Unnithan won from Kasaragod constituency with a margin of 40,438 votes against Communist Party of India (Marxist) candidate K. P. Satheesh Chandran in 2019 general election. Unnithan also won from Kasaragod constituency with a margin of 1,00,649 votes against Communist Party of India (Marxist) candidate M. V. Balakrishnan in 2024 general election. He portrayed some political characters in Malayalam movies also. The Tiger (2005) is his debut movie.

== Film career ==
During his college days, he was a part of professional as well as amateur plays and theatre. But he did not pursue a career in acting later on although he portrayed some political characters in Malayalam movies. The Tiger (2005) starring Suresh Gopi was his debut movie.

== Political career ==
Year	Position
2024	Unnithan won from Kasaragod Lok Sabha constituency with a margin of 1,00,649 votes against Communist Party of India (Marxist) candidate M.V Balakrishnan in general election.
2019	Unnithan won from Kasaragod Lok Sabha constituency with a margin of 40,438 votes against Communist Party of India (Marxist) candidate K. P. Satheesh Chandran in general election.
2018	Spokesperson to the Kerala Pradesh Congress Committee
2015	Chairman of the Kerala State Film Development Corporation (KSFDC)

== Filmography ==
Year	Title	Role	Notes
2005	The Tiger	CM Santhosh Kurup	
2006	Vaasthavam	Chief Minister	
2006	Smart City	Joseph Kotturan	
2006	Arunam		
2006	Balram vs. Tharadas	Politician	
2007	Best Friends		
2008	Jubilee		
2009	Black Dalia		
2009	Kancheepurathe Kalyanam	Vasudeva Goundar	
2010	Kanyakumari Express	Law Minister	Cameo
2010	Kausthubham		
2011	Uppukandam Brothers: Back in Action	Srampikkal Sathyaneshan	
2013	Entry		
2016	Ghost Villa		
2017	Kaviyude Osiyathu		
