= Socialist Party (India, 2011) =

Socialist Party (India)
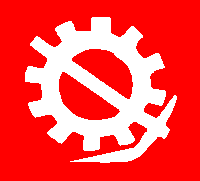
- Abbreviation: SP(I)
- President: Thampan Thomas
- General Secretary: Sandeep Pandey; S. Nurul Amin; Gautam Kumar Pritam
- Founded: 28 May 2011 (15 years ago)
- Headquarters: Lohiya Mazdoor Bhawan, H. No. 41/557, Dr. Tufel Ahmed Marg, Narhi, Lucknow, Uttar Pradesh
- Youth wing: Socialist Yuvjan Sabha
- Labour wing: Socialist Mazdoor Sabha
- Peasant's wing: Socialist Kisan Sabha
- Ideology: Democratic socialism Green politics
- Political position: Left-wing
- ECI status: Registered - Unrecognized

Socialist Party (India) is a left-wing political party founded May, 2011 in India.

== History ==
In 2011, several socialist groups and individuals formed the Socialist Party (India), which intends to carry forward the legacy of the Socialist Party formed in 1948. The party was formed through a resolution passed by Mr. Pannalal Surana at the foundation conference on 28 May 2011, under the chairmanship of Prof. Keshav Rao Jadhav.

== Current status ==
Party National Conference held at Wardha in Gujarath on 28–30 September 2021 elected Adv Thampan Thomas Ex MP from Kerala as president and Dr.Sandeep Pandey of UP as General Secretary.

== See also ==
- List of political parties in India
