= Ichilampady =

- village
- Location in Kerala, India
- Coordinates: 12°36′30″N 74°58′30″E
- Country: India
- State: Kerala
- District: Kasaragod
- Talukas: Kasaragod

Government
  - Type: Panchayati raj (India)
  - Body: Gram panchayat

Languages
  - Official: Malayalam, English
- Time zone: UTC+5:30 (IST)
- PIN: 6XXXXX
- Vehicle registration: KL-

Ichilampady is a mid-sized village in Kasaragod district in the state of Kerala, India.
