= K. A. Rajan =

Indian politician, advocate, and notary public

K. A. Rajan was a Communist Party of India politician. He was the Member of Parliament from Thrissur Lok Sabha constituency, Kerala, in 1977 and 1980.
