= Pattena =

- Village
- Location within Kerala
- Coordinates: 12.26066°N 75.136989°E
- Country: India
- State: Kerala
- District: Kasaragod
- City: Nileshwar
- ISO 3166 code: IN-KL

Pattena is part of Nileshwar municipality in Kerala, India.

== Geography ==
Pattena is a countryside village that blends amidst paddy fields and coconut farms with houses.

== Temples ==
Pattena is one of the areas in Nileshwar that has temples, such as the Suvarnavalli Vishnu, the Arayakkil Veerabhadra Swamy, and the Mungathu Arekkal.

== Transportation ==
The national highway passing through Nileshwaram connects to Mangalore in the north and Calicut in the south. The nearest railway station is Nileshwar on Mangalore-Palakkad line. There are airports at Mangalore and Calicut. Nileshwar bus stand connects to other bus or auto-rikshaw services to all nearby locations.
