= A. K. Gopalan =

Indian politician (1904–1977)

Comrade A. K. Gopalan
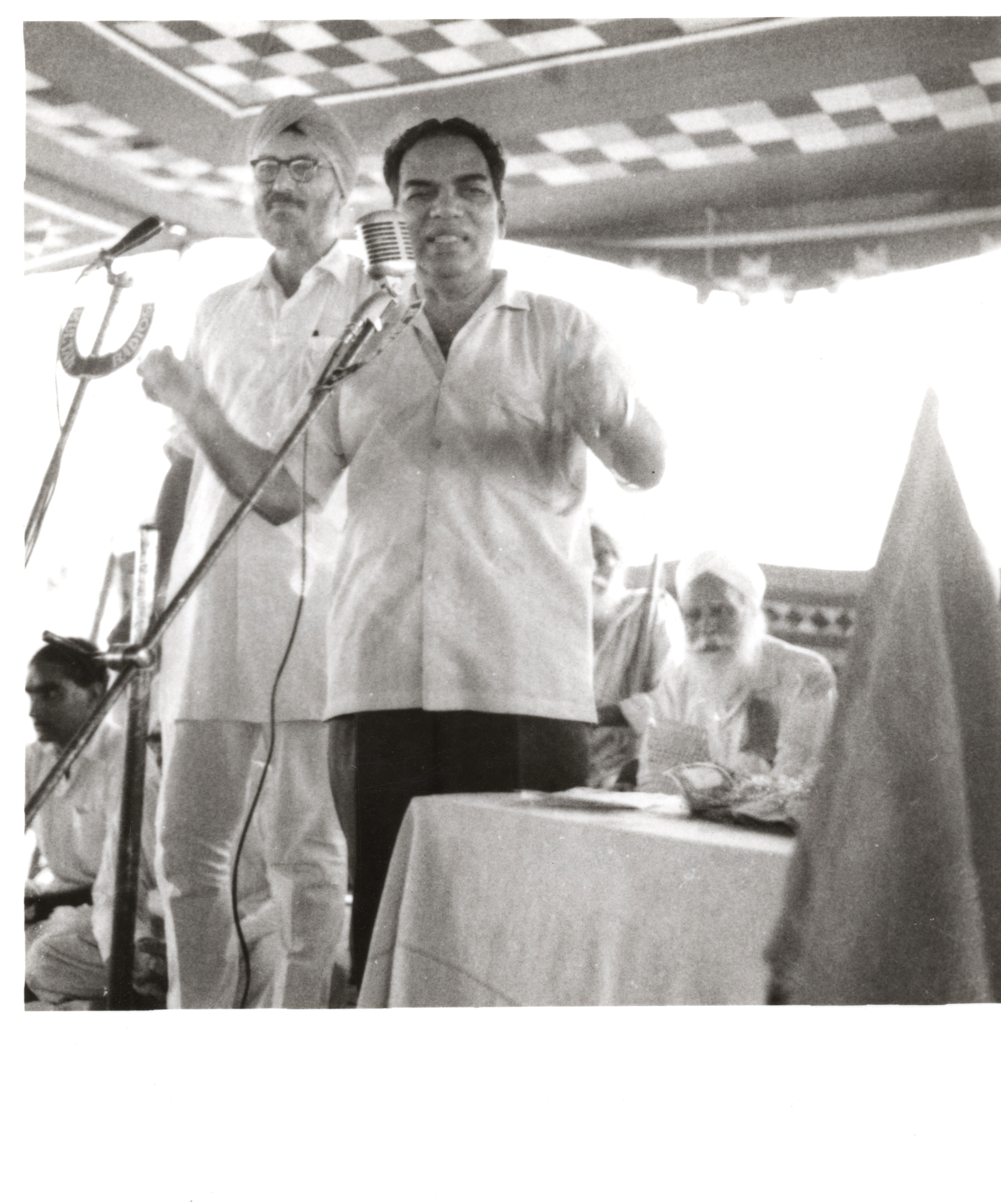
- Gopalan giving a speech in Jalandhar, Punjab in 1966

First Opposition Leader of Lok Sabha
- In office 1952-1969
- Preceded by: position established
- Succeeded by: Ram Subhag Singh

Member of the Indian Parliament for Kannur
- In office 1952 – 1957
- Preceded by: Position Created
- Succeeded by: C. K. Chandrappan

Member of the Indian Parliament for Kasaragod
- In office 1957 – 1971
- Preceded by: U. Srinivas Mallya; South Kanara (North)
- Succeeded by: Ramachandran Kadannappalli

Personal details
- Born: Ayillyath Kuttiari Gopalan Nambiar; 1 October 1904 Kannur, Malabar district, Madras Presidency, British India
- Died: 22 March 1977 (aged 72) Thiruvananthapuram, Kerala, India
- Party: Communist Party of India; Communist Party of India (Marxist)
- Spouse: Susheela Gopalan (m. 1952)
- Children: 1
- Parents: Velluva Kannoth Rairu Nambiar; Ayillyath Kuttiyeri Madhavi Amma
- Known for: Co-founder of Communist Party of India (Marxist)

Ayillyath Kuttiari Gopalan Nambiar (1 October 1904 – 22 March 1977), popularly known as A. K. Gopalan or AKG, was an Indian communist politician. He was one of sixteen Communist Party of India members elected to the first Lok Sabha in 1952, and later became one of the founding members of the Communist Party of India (Marxist).

== Early life and education ==
Ayillyath Kuttiari Gopalan Nambiar was born on 1 October 1904 in Peralasseri, Kannur District of Northern Kerala and educated in Tellichery. He was educated at Basel Evangelical Mission Parsi High School, Thalassery and at Government Brennen College, Thalassery. By the time he became a teacher, India's independence movement was becoming energised by Mahatma Gandhi. Gopalan took part in the Khilafat Movement which prompted a marked change in his outlook, transforming him into a dedicated full-time social and political worker. He was also involved in Malabar revolution. During this time, he removed the suffix to his name (Nambiar) that suggested caste status.

== Indian National Congress ==
In 1927 he joined the Indian National Congress and began playing an active role in the Khadi Movement and the upliftment of Harijans. He was arrested for participating in the salt satyagraha in 1930.

=== Kandoth assault ===
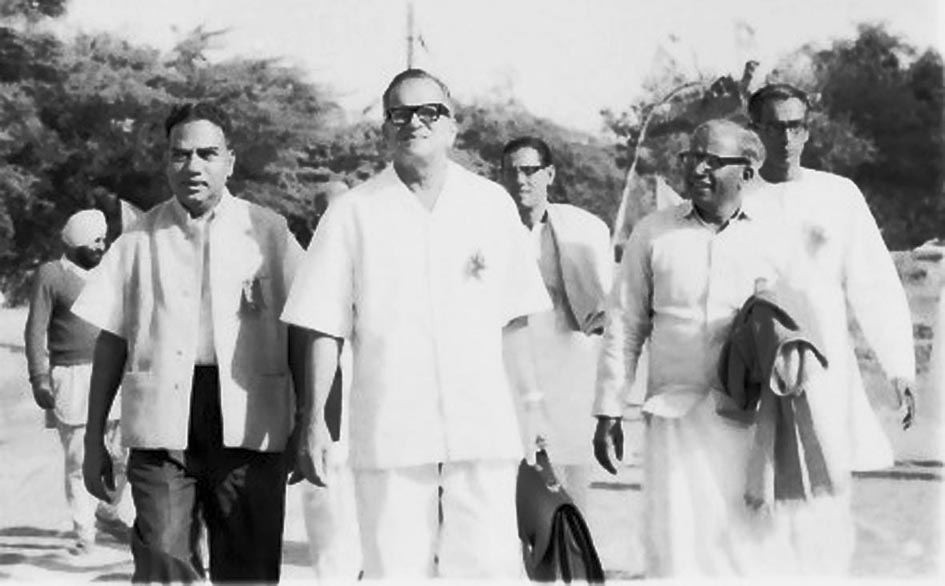
A.K. Gopalan (left)

While in prison he got acquainted with communism and became a member of the Congress Socialist Party and later the Communist Party of India when it finally took shape in Kerala in 1939. He led the hunger march from Malabar region to Madras in 1936 and the Malabar Jatha in support of the movement for responsible government in Travancore. The strongest caste system was in the North Kerala. The lower caste people were not allowed to walk on a public road in Payyannur. At this time A.K. Gopalan and the Keralites led the procession through the public road in front of the Kandoth Thiyya caste Temple (Palliyara) near Payyanur, Kannur. The lower castes were not allowed by the then Thiyyar chiefs to walk on a public road in Kandoth temple. "This is a time when Harijans are being denied the freedom to travel on public roads." The reason was that the nearby temple would be defiled. To promote the Guruvayoor Satyagraha. The group consisting of Kelappan and Gopalan marched along this route with the Harijans. As the procession approached the road, a crowd of about 200 people, including young men and women, A.K. Gopalan, Keraliyan and the Harijans were very badly beaten up by the Thiyya leaders. Gopal and others were later admitted to the hospital. The attack lasted for half an hour. This was the first crackdown on Gopalan's political career. Women came carrying heavy wooden sticks and beat them. All the people present in Ghosha were beaten by these chiefs. But A.K.G Standing where Gopalan and Keralian were, he faced the barrage. Others fled. A.K.G told the accompanying women to run to safety. The attack lasted for half an hour. The "Kandoth short stick" was infamous in the press of the day. Many people were injured. A.K. Gopalan and Keralian fell unconscious. They were taken by car to the hospital, where they lay unconscious for several hours. Even the Keralite's death statement was taken. Took home in the morning This attack K. This was Gopalan's first physical attack in his political career. But the "Kandoth assault" was an event that found a prominent place in news coverage.

== Further arrest ==
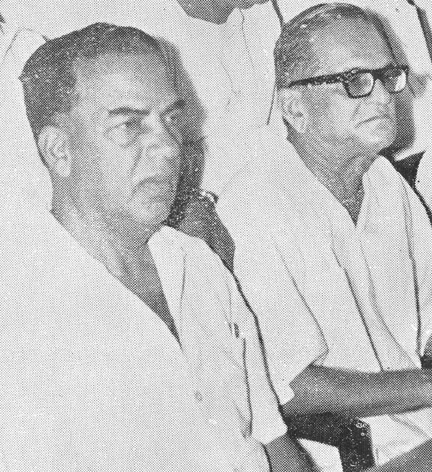
AKG with B.T. Ranadive

The outbreak of the Second World War in 1939 prompted an upsurge in activism against British domination, and Gopalan was again arrested. But in 1942 he escaped from prison and remained at large till the end of the war in 1945. He was arrested again shortly after the end of the war and was still behind bars when India became independent on 15 August 1947. He was released a few weeks later. Thereafter he was a member of Lok Sabha for 5 consecutive terms till his death on 22 March 1977 and became one of the leaders of opposition parties in the parliament of India.

During the Sino-Indian war in 1962, AKG along with other Indian communists like E.M.S. took an impartial view and requested both nations to discuss and settle the matter peacefully. The official leadership of the party at that time denounced this and supported the India Government. Many leaders of the left group were arrested with the support of the leadership of the party. When the party leadership blocked the publication of an article written by then General Secretary EMS condemning government for attacking the left leaders in the party using the cover of the war, he himself quit the post and supported the left group. AKG was part of the left group and faced disciplinary action by the party leadership dominated by the right. During this time a newspaper published a letter allegedly written by rightist leaders S.A Dange to the British during the freedom struggle. In this letter he promised to keep away from the freedom struggle if granted bail. This was used by the left group to beat the right. When the demand of the left to set up a party-level inquiry about the alleged letter of S.A Dange was rejected in the National Council of CPI, the left group walked away and formed a new Party.

AKG joined the new break away faction, which later came to be known as Communist Party of India (Marxist). He also wrote extensively. His autobiography Ente Jeevitha Kadha has been translated into many languages. His other works include For Land, Around the World, Work in Parliament, and Collected Speeches, all in Malayalam.

=== A. K. Gopalan v. State of Madras ===
In 1950, A. K. Gopalan was served with a detention order under Preventive Detention Act 1950. He appealed to Supreme Court under Article 32 of Indian Constitution claiming his fundamental right of freedom of speech and expression and to travel freely in India have been violated. The six-judge bench of Supreme Court with a majority of four upheld his detention. But the bench struck down Section 14 of this act, which provided that the grounds for detention should not be given to detenus.

== Political career ==
Election	Constituency	Result	Majority
1952	Kannur	Won	87,029
1957	Kasargod	Won	5,145
1962	Kasargod	Won	83,363
1967	Kasargod	Won	118,510
1971	Palakkad	Won	52,266

== Marriage ==
AKG was earlier married and later left his wife. Later AKG was married to Susheela Gopalan, who was a prominent Marxist and trade union activist, from the Cheerappanchira family. His daughter, Laila, is married to P. Karunakaran, a former Member of Parliament for the Kasargod constituency.

== Indian Coffee House ==
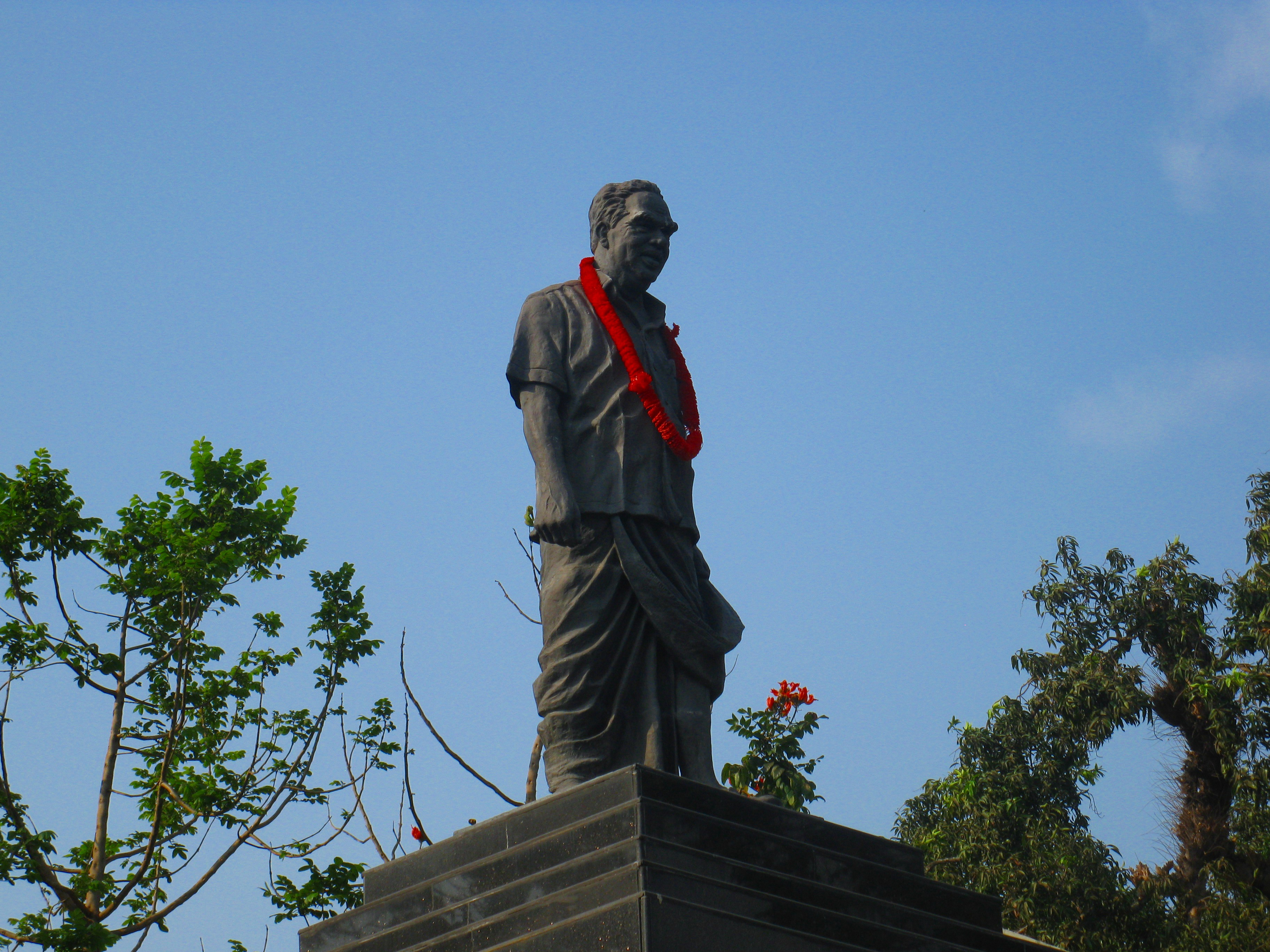
Statue of Gopalan in Kannur

AKG played an important role in the formation of Indian Coffee House, a worker cooperative initiative by organising the thrown out employees of Coffee Houses of Coffee Board to establish ICHs in late 1950s.

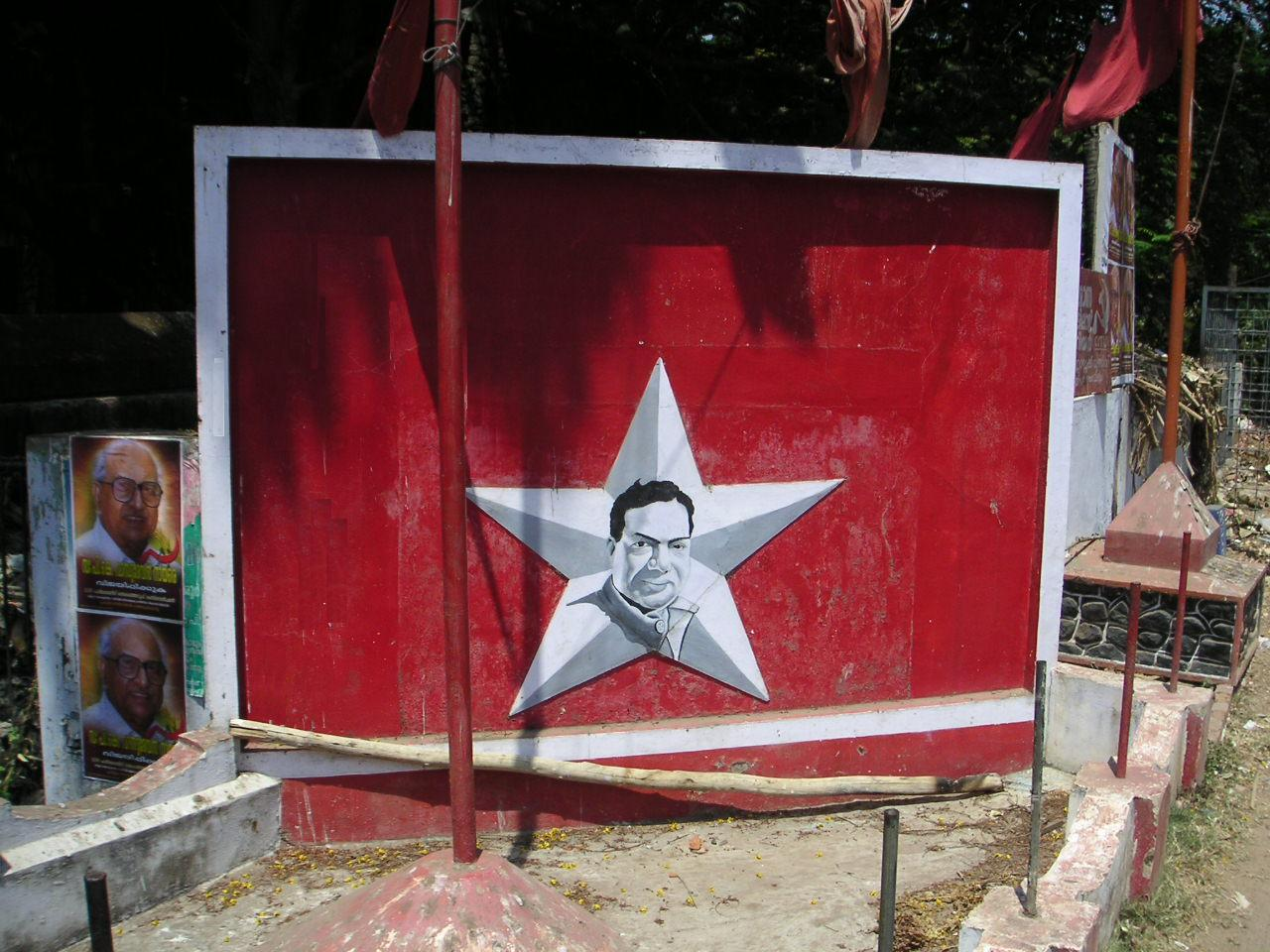
AKG memorial in Thiruvananthapuram

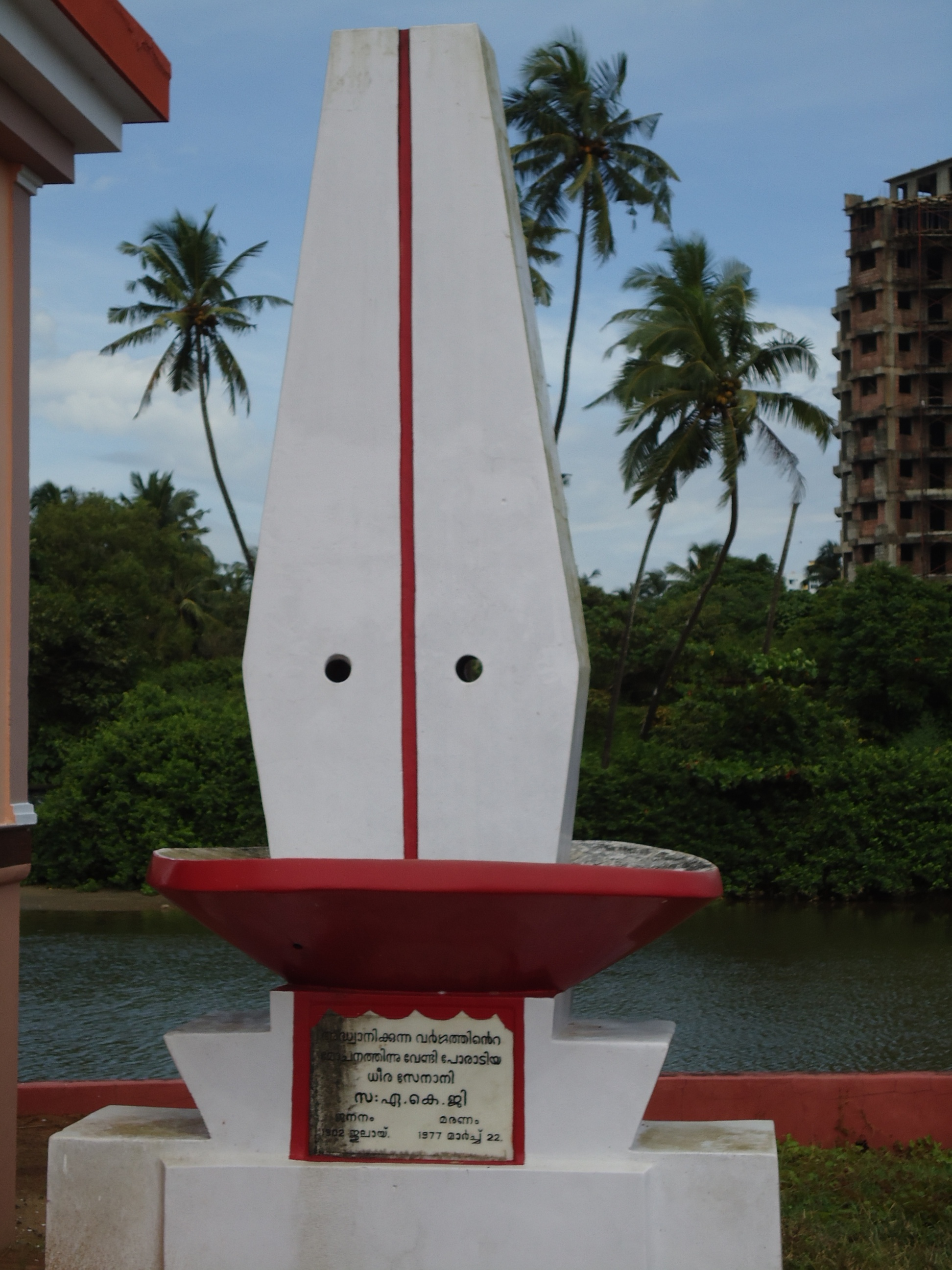
AKG smrithi mandapam Payyambalam Beach

== In popular culture ==
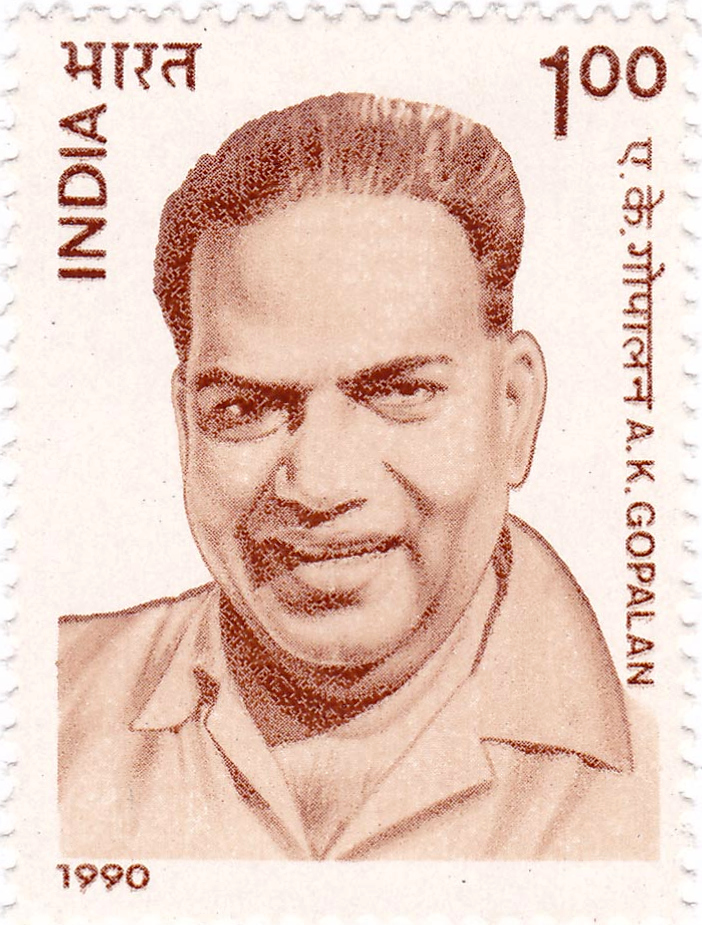
AK Gopalan 1990 stamp of India

Shaji N. Karun, a prominent film director of Kerala, made a biopic on AKG titled AKG – Athijeevanathinte Kanalvazhikal. The film used a part-documentary, part-fiction format. It was released in theatres across Kerala in August 2008. Baiju played Gopalan in the 2014 feature film Vasanthathinte Kanal Vazhikalil.

=== Autobiography – My Life Story ===
His autobiography is Ente Jeevitha Katha (written in Malayalam) Ente Jeevitha Katha-. Archived from the original on 21 May 2024.

== See also ==
- E. K. Nayanar
- E. M. S. Namboodiripad
- Azhikodan Raghavan
