= Savithri Lakshmanan =

Indian politician

- Constituency: Mukundapuram (Lok Sabha constituency)

Personal details
- Born: 15 October 1945 (age 80) Vadakkekara, British India
- Party: Indian National Congress
- Spouse: V.K. Lekshmanan Nair
- Children: 1 son and 1 daughter

Savithri Lakshmanan is an Indian National Congress politician from Thrissur in Kerala state, India. She was the member of Lok Sabha from Mukundapuram (Lok Sabha constituency) in 1989 and 1991. She was also the member of Kerala Legislative Assembly in 1996.
