= P. A. Antony =

Indian politician

Member, Lok Sabha
- In office 1989–1991

Member, Lok Sabha
- In office 1984–1989

Member, 4th Kerala Legislative assembly

Personal details
- Born: January 26, 1936
- Died: April 24, 1996 (aged 60)

P. A. Antony (1936–1996) was an Indian National Congress politician from Thrissur City. He was the Member of Parliament from Thrissur Lok Sabha constituency, Kerala, in 1984 and 1989.
