= Thampan Thomas =

Indian politician

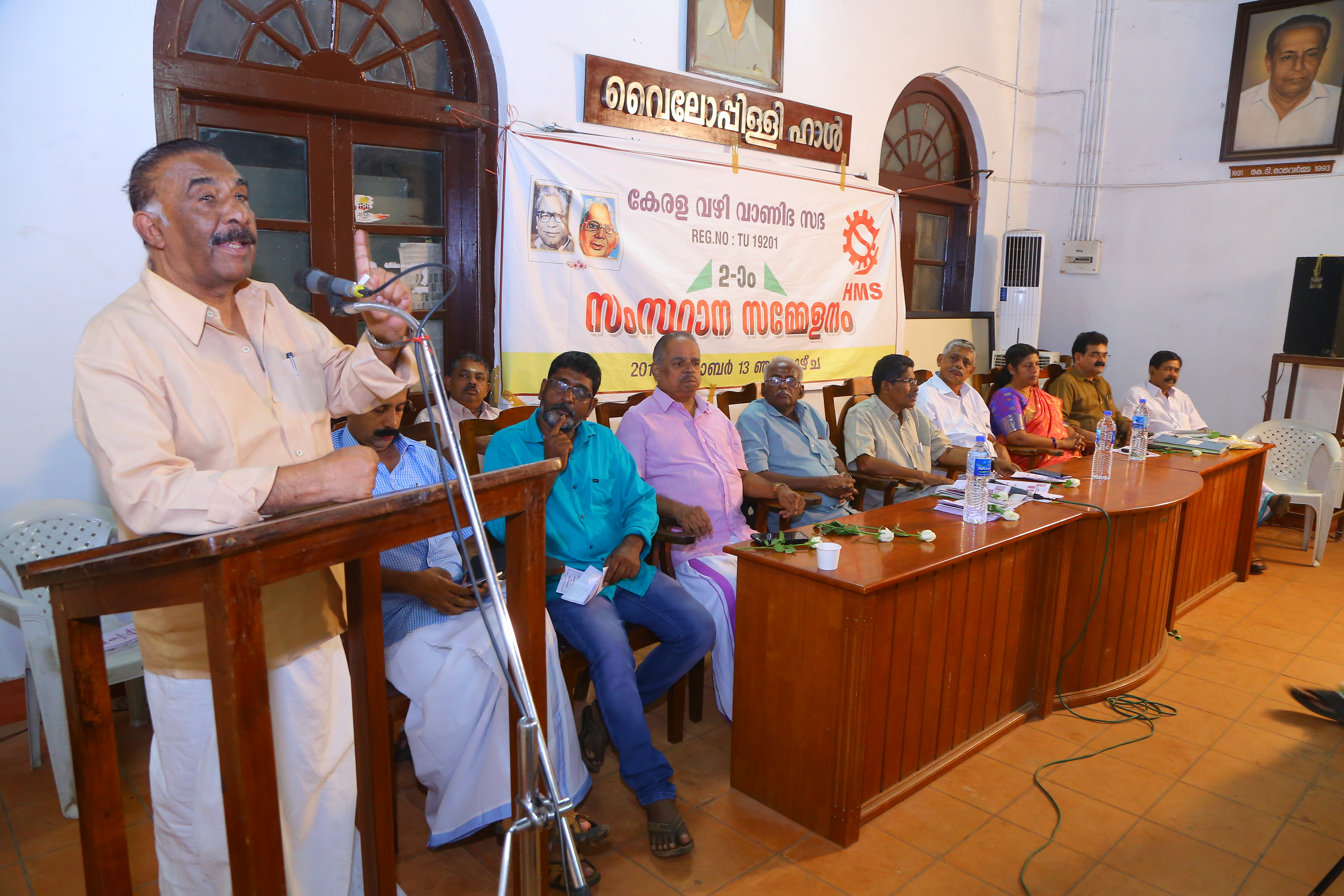
- Thampan Thomas inaugurates HMS Vazhivanibha sabha Kerala state conference at Kerala Sahitya Akademi.

Member of Parliament, Lok Sabha
- In office 1984–1989
- Preceded by: P.J. Kurien
- Succeeded by: P.J. Kurien
- Constituency: Mavelikara, Kerala

Personal details
- Born: 11 May 1940 (age 86) Pulladu Village, Travancore, British India (Now Pathanamthitta district, Kerala)
- Party: Socialist Party (India); Janata Party
- Spouse: Saramma Varghese
- Children: 3 daughters

Thampan Thomas (born 11 May 1940) is an Indian politician. He was elected to the Lok Sabha, lower house of the Parliament of India from Mavelikara, Kerala in 1984 as a member of the Janata Party. He is president of Socialist Party (India).

== Biography ==
Thampan Thomas Ex-MP is an Indian Socialist and trade union leader as well as a prominent Advocate of the Kerala High Court and Supreme Court of India. He represented the Mavelikkara LS constituency of Kerala during 1984–89. He has been travelling with the socialist movement for the last six decades. At present he is the National President of the Socialist Party(India). Since the sixties, he has been active in the socialist movement and close to leaders like Jayaprakash Narayan, Ram Manohar Lohia, George Fernandes etc. Due to his involvement in the activities of JP and other leaders he was arrested during Emergency and jailed for 19 months at Viyyur Central jail of Kerala. After the emergency, he was involved in the formation of the Jantha Party and later the Janata Dal. He was one among the five national General Secretaries of Janata Dal at the time of its formation.

Born on 11 May 1940 at Thiruvalla, he completed graduation from Aluva U C College and Law from Ernakulam Law College. Enrolled as an advocate in the High Court of Kerala in 1964. He was active in the socialist movement and started his social interventions by organising Scavengers of Paravur, a small town near Aluva at the age of 20 inspired by local socialist leaders. During his student days, he organised workers of the industries of Ernakulam industrial belt and formed their unions. This involvement made him close to Hind Mazdur Sabha, the largest Trade union in India. He became its national president for three consecutive terms.

He represented the Indian working-class and HMS in many international forums including ILO. He was the Worker's Group Adviser of ILOP during 1985–2018. HE was associated with ICFTU, ITUC, SARTUC, Commonwealth Trade Union Congress, NAMA, TUAC, G-20, BRICS, Asia Europe TUF, Migrant Forum Asia etc. he participated in Labour conferences in 40 countries.

He is a premiere in the cooperative movement of Kerala. During the 1967–1984 period he served as the President of Ernakulam District Co=oprtive Society. He served as the Vice President of the National Consumer Cooperative Federation during 1974–1987. During the 1968–74 period he served as the Chairman of Kerala State Warehousing Corporation.

Wife Saramma Varghese. Three daughters- Anupama Thampan Thomas(Advocate, Bahrain) Minu Thampan(Engineer, Abudhabi) Manju Thampan (Doctor, London)

== Bibliography ==
What is happening! How to face it? Thoomba, Thoolika, Parliament (autobiography).

A Life in struggle - Thampan Thomas (autobiography)
