= T. Govindan =

Indian politician (1940–2011)

Member of the Indian Parliament for Kasaragod
- In office 1996–2004
- Preceded by: Ramanna Rai
- Succeeded by: P. Karunakaran

Personal details
- Born: 11 January 1940 Payyanur, Madras Presidency (present day Payyanur, Kannur, Kerala)
- Died: 23 October 2011 (aged 71)
- Party: CPI(M)
- Spouse: Savithri
- Source: Parliament of India

T. Govindan (11 January 1940 - 23 October 2011) was an Indian politician and a former Member of Lok Sabha who represented the Kasaragod constituency of Kerala thrice in the 11th Lok Sabha, 12th Lok Sabha and 13th Lok Sabha respectively. He was a member of the Communist Party of India (Marxist).

Mr. Govindan had served as vice-chairman of the Kerala Khadi and Village Industries Board. He died on 23 October 2011.
