= I. Rama Rai =

Indian politician (1931–2010)

Ichilampady Rama Rai

Member of the Indian Parliament for Kasaragod
- In office 1984–1989
- Preceded by: Ramanna Rai
- Succeeded by: Ramanna Rai

Personal details
- Born: 13 March 1931 Ichilampady, Kasaragod Taluka, Madras Presidency
- Died: 2 December 2010 (aged 79) Mangalore, India
- Party: Indian National Congress
- Spouse: K.B. Umawathi R. Rai
- Children: 2 sons 2 daughters
- Source: Parliament of India

Ichilampady Rama Rai was an Indian politician who served as member of parliament representing the Kasaragod constituency of Kerala in the 8th Lok Sabha. He was a member of the Indian National Congress and served as the vice-president of the Cannanore DCC from 1965 to 1980, and as its president for 18 years. He was also the vice-president of the Kerala state Karshaka Congress for 7 years, apart from serving as the member of All-India Congress Committee (I) and as executive committee member of Karnataka Pradesh Congress Committee.

== Bio ==
Rai was born to mother Ichlampady Shanthamma Rai and father Ariadka Subbaya Rai. He completed his education at Kumbla Government School, St. Aloysius College (Mangalore) and Pachaiyappa's College, Chennai earning the degree Bachelor of Science. He was married to Umavathi Rai and has four children two sons and two daughters. He died on 2 December 2010 after a prolonged illness and was cremated on 3 December.
