= Ramanna Rai =

Indian politician (1930–2009)

Gadigudde Ramanna Rai

Member of the Indian Parliament for Kasaragod
- In office 1980–1984
- Preceded by: Ramachandran Kadannappalli
- Succeeded by: I. Rama Rai

Member of the Indian Parliament for Kasaragod
- In office 1984–1996
- Preceded by: I. Rama Rai
- Succeeded by: T. Govindan

Personal details
- Born: 28 September 1930 Kumbadaje, Kasaragod Taluka, Madras Presidency
- Died: 6 October 2009 (aged 79) Kasaragod Town, Kerala, India
- Party: CPI(M)
- Source: Parliament of India

Ramanna Rai Gadigudde (28 September 1930 – 6 October 2009) was an Indian politician, social activist and Member of Parliament who represented the Kasaragod constituency of Kerala thrice in the 7th Lok Sabha, 9th Lok Sabha and 10th Lok Sabha respectively. He was a member of the Communist Party of India (Marxist).

== Early life ==
Rai was born in an affluent Tulu-speaking Bunt family of landlords. He completed his education at Government college, Madras University and Karnataka University earning the degrees of B.A. and L.L.B.

== Political career ==
Rai's public life started with his active participation in the movement against the merger of Kasaragod with Kerala in 1956. Later he joined the Communist Party of India (CPI) and served as the secretary of the Kasaragod local committee of undivided Communist Party from 1960 to 1964. After a division in the Communist party, he identified himself with CPM and served as member of the Kannur district committee of CPM from 1965 to 1986. He served as the president of Kasargod Municipal Council from 1968 to 1979 and got elected to the Lok Sabha from Kasaragod constituency thrice in the year 1980, 1989 and 1991.

== Later life ==
Rai died on 6 October 2009. He had withdrawn himself from public life due to ill health. An atheist by conviction, his body was donated to the Pariyaram Medical College as per his wishes instead of being cremated according to the traditional Hindu rites of the Bunt community to which he belonged.

== Electoral performance ==
=== Lok Sabha ===
Year	Constituency	Party	Votes	%	Opponent	Party	Votes	%	Result	Margin	%
1977	Kasaragod	CPI(M)	222,263	49.44	K. Ramachandran	INC	227,305	50.56	Lost	▼5,042	▼1.12
1980	Kasaragod	CPI(M)	263,673	56.95	O. Rajagopal	JP	190,086	41.05	Won	▲73,587	▲15.90
1989	Kasaragod	CPI(M)	358,723	44.99	I. Rama Rai	INC	357,177	44.80	Won	▲1,546	▲0.19
1991	Kasaragod	CPI(M)	344,536	44.82	K.C. Venugopal	INC	335,113	43.59	Won	▲9,423	▲1.23
