= Susheela Gopalan =

Indian Communist leader and members of the Communist Party of India (1929–2001)

- Portrait of Susheela Gopalan

Minister for Industries and Social Welfare Kerala
- In office 20 May 1996 – 13 May 2001
- Ministry: Third E.K.Nayanar Ministry
- Constituency: Ambalappuzha
- Preceded by: P. K. Kunhalikutty (Minister for Industries); P. K. K. Baava (Minister for Social Welfare)
- Succeeded by: P. K. Kunhalikutty (Minister for Industries and Social Welfare)

Member of Parliament
- In office 1980–1984
- Constituency: Alappuzha
- In office 1991–1996
- Constituency: Chirayinkil

Personal details
- Born: 29 December 1929 Muhamma, Alappuzha, Kerala
- Died: 19 December 2001 (aged 71) Thiruvananthapuram, Kerala
- Party: Communist Party of India (Marxist)
- Spouse: A. K. Gopalan

Susheela Gopalan (29 December 1929 – 19 December 2001) was an Indian Communist leader and one of the founding members of the Communist Party of India (Marxist).

== Life ==
She was elected Member of Parliament thrice, from Ambalappuzha (1967), Alappuzha (1980) and Chirayinkil (1991), and was a Minister in the Government of Kerala for a number of years. Born to the famous kalari family, Cheerappanchira in Muhamma, she was educated in Alappuzha and Trivandrum and joined the Communist Party. She married A. K. Gopalan in 1952, one of the veterans of the party, whom she had met during his years in hiding. She was 25 years younger than him.

She was one of the few women who held major responsibilities in the CPI (M) structure. She was a Minister in a number of LDF cabinets in Kerala. During her last term she was the Minister for Industries and Social Welfare. She lost by one vote to E. K. Nayanar in an election for chief ministership in the state committee of CPI(M), in whose cabinet she became the Minister for Industries and Social Welfare.
