= Mukundapuram Lok Sabha constituency =

Former Lok Sabha constituency

Coordinates: 10.21°N 76.26°E

Mukundapuram
- Former Lok Sabha constituency

Constituency details
- Country: India
- Region: South India
- State: Kerala
- Established: 1957
- Abolished: 2008
- Reservation: None

Mukundapuram Lok Sabha constituency was a Lok Sabha constituency in Kerala state in southern India. It was dissolved in 2008, and was replaced by Chalakudy Lok Sabha Constituency.

== Assembly segments ==
Mukundapuram Lok Sabha constituency was composed of the following legislative assembly segments:

1. Mala
2. Irinjalakuda
3. Vadakkekara
4. Kodungallore
5. Angamali
6. Chalakudy
7. Perumbavur

== Members of Parliament ==
As Crangannur in Thiru–Kochi

- 1952: K. T. Achuthan

Year	Winner	Party
1957	Narayanankutty Menon	Communist Party of India
1962	Panampilly Govinda Menon	Indian National Congress
1967	Panampilly Govinda Menon	Indian National Congress
1971	A. C. George	Indian National Congress
1977	A. C. George	Indian National Congress
1980	E. Balanandan	Communist Party of India (Marxist)
1984	K. Mohandas	Kerala Congress (Joseph)
1989	Savithri Lakshmanan	Indian National Congress
1991	Savithri Lakshmanan	Indian National Congress
1996	P. C. Chacko	Indian National Congress
1998	A. C. Jose	Indian National Congress
1999	K. Karunakaran	Indian National Congress
2004	Lonappan Nambadan	Communist Party of India (Marxist)

== Election results ==
Vote share of Winning candidates
2004	51.89%
1996	47.81%
1991	48.32%
1989	48.77%
1984	51.44%
1980	56.73%
1977	48.53%
1971	58.08%
1967	49.75%
1962	54.10%
1957	44.02%

=== General Elections 2004 ===
2004 Indian general election: Mukundapuram
Party	Candidate	Votes	%	±%
CPI(M)	Lonappan Nambadan	375,175	51.89%	8.01%
INC	Padmaja Venugopal	2,58,078	35.69%	−14.86%
BJP	Prof. Mathew Pailee	62,338	8.62%	
Independent	Rani Jose	7,999	1.11%	
Independent	Sabu Ali	7,071	0.98%	
Independent	D. R. Pisharody	6,020	0.83%	
BSP	T. K. Manoj	4,377	0.61%	
Margin of victory		1,17,097	16.20%	9.52%
Turnout		7,23,009	70.68%	−2.52%
Registered electors		10,24,150		−5.47%
CPI(M) gain from INC		Swing	1.33%	

=== General Elections 1999 ===
1999 Indian general election: Mukundapuram
Party	Candidate	Votes	%	±%
INC	K. Karunakaran	397,156	50.56%	3.85%
CPI(M)	E. M. Sreedharan	3,44,693	43.88%	−1.63%
Socialist Republican Party (Kerala)	M. S. Muraleedharan	30,779	3.92%	
Independent	M. K. Thankappan	4,071	0.52%	
Margin of victory		52,463	6.68%	5.48%
Turnout		7,85,578	73.12%	−1.49%
Registered electors		10,83,445		4.75%
INC hold		Swing	2.75%	

=== General Elections 1998 ===
1998 Indian general election: Mukundapuram
Party	Candidate	Votes	%	±%
INC	A. C. Jose	347,945	46.71%	−1.10%
CPI(M)	P. Govindappillai	3,38,996	45.50%	1.08%
BJP	P. D. Purushothaman Master	54,479	7.31%	2.50%
Margin of victory		8,949	1.20%	−2.18%
Turnout		7,44,981	72.73%	−1.88%
Registered electors		10,34,337		2.98%
INC hold		Swing	-1.10%	

=== General Elections 1996 ===
1996 Indian general election: Mukundapuram
Party	Candidate	Votes	%	±%
INC	P. C. Chacko	349,801	47.81%	−0.51%
CPI(M)	V. Viswanatha Menon	3,25,044	44.43%	−2.25%
BJP	Narayana Iyer	35,227	4.81%	0.71%
Independent	Thomas Parokkaran	10,208	1.40%	
Independent	Prof. Abdul Khayyum Punnilath	6,888	0.94%	
Independent	Kunjukuttan Kodinjilli	3,335	0.46%	
Margin of victory		24,757	3.38%	1.73%
Turnout		7,31,666	74.61%	−3.12%
Registered electors		10,04,427		3.03%
INC hold		Swing	-0.51%	

=== General Elections 1991 ===
1991 Indian general election: Mukundapuram
Party	Candidate	Votes	%	±%
INC	Savithri Lakshmanan	362,029	48.32%	−0.44%
CPI(M)	A. P. Kurian	3,49,664	46.67%	0.39%
BJP	K. V. Sreedharan Master	30,776	4.11%	0.29%
Independent	V. M. Ayoob	3,688	0.49%	
Margin of victory		12,365	1.65%	−0.84%
Turnout		7,49,194	77.74%	−4.69%
Registered electors		9,74,881		5.83%
INC hold		Swing	-0.44%	

=== General Elections 1989 ===
1989 Indian general election: Mukundapuram
Party	Candidate	Votes	%	±%
INC	Savithri Lakshmanan	367,931	48.77%	
CPI(M)	C. O. Poulose Master	3,49,177	46.28%	2.69%
BJP	K. K. Gangadharan Master	28,781	3.81%	
Margin of victory		18,754	2.49%	−5.37%
Turnout		7,54,460	82.42%	1.46%
Registered electors		9,21,201		31.03%
INC gain from KC(J)		Swing	-2.68%	

=== General Elections 1984 ===
1984 Indian general election: Mukundapuram
Party	Candidate	Votes	%	±%
KC(J)	K. Mohandas	290,594	51.44%	
CPI(M)	M. M. Lawrence	2,46,209	43.59%	−13.15%
Independent	V. Balakrishnan	20,234	3.58%	
Independent	Garvasts Areekkal	2,989	0.53%	
Independent	P. T. Johny	2,566	0.45%	
Margin of victory		44,385	7.86%	−8.40%
Turnout		5,64,866	80.96%	17.17%
Registered electors		7,03,029		10.79%
KC(J) gain from CPI(M)		Swing	-5.29%	

=== General Elections 1980 ===
1980 Indian general election: Mukundapuram
Party	Candidate	Votes	%	±%
CPI(M)	E. Balanandan	227,235	56.73%	
Independent	C. G. Kumaran	1,62,104	40.47%	
Independent	K. V. Francis	7,374	1.84%	
Independent	K. L. Thimothy	2,054	0.51%	
Margin of victory		65,131	16.26%	15.35%
Turnout		4,00,526	63.79%	−20.24%
Registered electors		6,34,533		12.89%
CPI(M) gain from INC		Swing	8.21%	

=== General Elections 1977 ===
1977 Indian general election: Mukundapuram
Party	Candidate	Votes	%	±%
INC	A. C. George	225,095	48.53%	−9.55%
Independent	S. C. S. Menon	2,20,875	47.62%	
Independent	C. K. Balkrishnan	12,583	2.71%	
Independent	Varkey Master	3,820	0.82%	
Margin of victory		4,220	0.91%	−18.65%
Turnout		4,63,849	84.04%	12.71%
Registered electors		5,62,082		6.65%
INC hold		Swing	-9.55%	

=== General Elections 1971 ===
1971 Indian general election: Mukundapuram
Party	Candidate	Votes	%	±%
INC	A. C. George	215,636	58.08%	8.32%
CPI(M)	C. O. Paul	1,43,026	38.52%	
SSP	C. G. Janardhanan	12,624	3.40%	
Margin of victory		72,610	19.56%	18.05%
Turnout		3,71,286	71.33%	−10.30%
Registered electors		5,27,041		16.79%
INC hold		Swing	8.32%	

=== General Elections 1967 ===
1967 Indian general election: Mukundapuram
Party	Candidate	Votes	%	±%
INC	Panampilly Govinda Menon	175,778	49.75%	−4.35%
Independent	C. G. Janardhanan	1,70,440	48.24%	
Independent	S. P. Luis	7,078	2.00%	
Margin of victory		5,338	1.51%	−9.16%
Turnout		3,53,296	81.63%	1.28%
Registered electors		4,51,269		−1.33%
INC hold		Swing	-4.35%	

=== General Elections 1962 ===
1962 Indian general election: Mukundapuram
Party	Candidate	Votes	%	±%
INC	Panampilly Govinda Menon	195,038	54.10%	11.93%
CPI	Narayankutty Menon Thekkechalil	1,56,587	43.44%	−0.58%
Independent	E. P. Varghese	8,866	2.46%	
Margin of victory		38,451	10.67%	8.82%
Turnout		3,60,491	80.35%	5.44%
Registered electors		4,57,338		12.11%
INC gain from CPI		Swing	10.09%	

=== General Elections 1957 ===
1957 Indian general election: Mukundapuram
Party	Candidate	Votes	%	±%
CPI	Narayanankutty Menon	134,505	44.02%	
INC	E. K. Madhavan	1,28,860	42.17%	
PSP	Mathai Alunkal	34,117	11.17%	
Independent	Moothedan Varkey	8,087	2.65%	
Margin of victory		5,645	1.85%	
Turnout		3,05,569	74.90%	
Registered electors		4,07,952		
CPI win (new seat)				

== See also ==
- Chalakudy (Lok Sabha constituency)
- List of former constituencies of the Lok Sabha
