= Kasaragod Lok Sabha constituency =

Constituency of the Indian parliament in Kerala

Coordinates: 12.51°N 74.98°E

Kasaragod KL-1
- Lok Sabha constituency
- Kasaragod Lok Sabha constituency

Constituency details
- Country: India
- Region: South India
- State: Kerala
- Assembly constituencies: Manjeshwar; Kasaragod; Udma; Kanhangad; Trikaripur; Payyanur; Kalliasseri
- Established: 1957
- Total electors: 14,52,230
- Reservation: None

Member of Parliament
- 18th Lok Sabha
- Incumbent Rajmohan Unnithan
- Party: INC
- Alliance: UDF
- Elected year: 2024

Kasaragod Lok Sabha constituency is one of the 20 Lok Sabha (parliamentary) constituencies in Kerala state in southern India.

== Assembly segments ==
Kasaragod Lok Sabha constituency is composed of the following assembly segments:

No	Name	District	Member	Party	2024 Lead
1	Manjeshwar	Kasaragod	A. K. M. Ashraf	IUML	INC
2	Kasaragod	Kasaragod	Kallatra Mahin	IUML	INC
3	Udma	Kasaragod	K. Neelakandan	INC	INC
4	Kanhangad	Kasaragod	Govindan Pallikappil	CPI	INC
5	Trikaripur	Kasaragod	Sandeep Varier	INC	INC
6	Payyanur	Kannur	V. Kunhikrishnan	IND	CPI(M)
7	Kalliasseri	Kannur	M. Vijin	CPI(M)	CPI(M)

== Members of Parliament ==
Most Successful parties from Kasaragod Lok Sabha
1. CPI(M) (10 Times) (62.5%)
2. INC (5 Times) (25.0%)
3. CPI (2 Times) (12.5%)

Year	Member	Party
1957	A. K. Gopalan	Communist Party of India
1962	A. K. Gopalan	Communist Party of India
1967	A. K. Gopalan	Communist Party of India (Marxist)
1971	Kadannappalli Ramachandran	Indian National Congress
1977	Kadannappalli Ramachandran	Indian National Congress
1980	Ramanna Rai	Communist Party of India (Marxist)
1984	I. Rama Rai	Indian National Congress (I)
1989	Ramanna Rai	Communist Party of India (Marxist)
1991	Ramanna Rai	Communist Party of India (Marxist)
1996	T. Govindan	Communist Party of India (Marxist)
1998	T. Govindan	Communist Party of India (Marxist)
1999	T. Govindan	Communist Party of India (Marxist)
2004	P. Karunakaran	Communist Party of India (Marxist)
2009	P. Karunakaran	Communist Party of India (Marxist)
2014	P. Karunakaran	Communist Party of India (Marxist)
2019	Rajmohan Unnithan	Indian National Congress
2024	Rajmohan Unnithan	Indian National Congress

== Election results ==
Vote share of Winning candidates
2024	44.10%
2019	43.50%
2014	39.52%
2009	45.51%
2004	48.50%
1999	45.77%
1998	45.69%
1996	46.63%
1991	44.82%
1989	44.99%
1984	45.54%
1980	56.95%
1977	50.56%
1971	45.98%
1967	61.47%
1962	62.17%
1957	51.02%

=== General Elections 2029 ===
2029 Indian general election: Kasaragod
Party	Candidate	Votes	%	±%
UDF				
LDF				
NDA				
NOTA	None of the above			
Margin of victory				
Turnout				
		Swing		

=== General Elections 2024 ===
2024 Indian general election: Kasaragod
Party	Candidate	Votes	%	±%
INC	Rajmohan Unnithan	490,659	44.10	▲0.60
CPI(M)	M. V. Balakrishnan	3,90,010	35.06	▼4.75
BJP	M. L. Ashwini	2,19,558	19.73	▲3.60
BSP	M. Sukumari	1,612	0.14	
Independent	K. R. Rajeshwari	897	0.08	
Independent	K. Manoharan	804	0.07	
Independent	Aneesh Payyanur	759	0.07	
Independent	N. Keshav Nayak	507	0.05	
NOTA	None of the above	7,112	0.64	
Majority		1,00,649	9.04	+5.34
Turnout		11,17,221	76.76	
Registered electors		14,52,230		
INC hold		Swing		

By Assembly Segments
No.	Status (Assembly Constituency)	Votes			Lead
No.	Status (Assembly Constituency)	Rajmohan Unnithan	M. V. Balakrishnan	M. L. Ashwini	Lead
1	Manjeshwar	74,437	30,156	57,179	17,258
2	Kasaragod	73,407	26,162	47,032	26,372
3	Udma	72,448	60,489	31,245	11,959
4	Kanhangad	69,171	67,121	29,301	2,050
5	Thrikaripur	75,643	65,195	17,085	10,448
6	Payyannur	58,184	71,441	18,466	13,257
7	Kalliasseri	64,347	65,405	17,688	1,058

=== General Elections 2019 ===
2019 Indian general election: Kasaragod
Party	Candidate	Votes	%	±%
INC	Rajmohan Unnithan	474,961	43.50	4.70
CPI(M)	K. P. Satheesh Chandran	4,34,523	39.80	0.29
BJP	Ravisha Thanthri Kuntar	1,76,049	16.13	−1.61
Independent	Govindan B. Alinthazhe	2,670	0.24	
BSP	Basheer Alady	1,910	0.17	
Independent	Rameshan Bandadka	1,711	0.16	
Independent	R. K. Ranadivan	1,478	0.13	
Independent	Saji	1,278	0.12	
Independent	K. Narendra Kumar	1,058	0.10	
NOTA	None of the above	4,417	0.40	
Margin of victory		40,438	3.70	2.99
Turnout		10,91,752	80.66	1.71
Registered electors		13,63,937		9.67
INC gain from CPI(M)		Swing	3.99	

By Assembly Segments
No.	Status (Assembly Constituency)	Votes			Lead
No.	Status (Assembly Constituency)	Rajmohan Unnithan	K. P. Satheesh Chandran	Ravisha Thanthri Kuntar	Lead
1	Manjeshwar	68,217	32,796	57,104	11,113
2	Kasaragod	69,790	28,567	46,630	23,160
3	Udma	72,324	63,387	23,786	8,937
4	Kanhangad	72,570	74,791	20,046	2,221
5	Thrikaripur	74,504	76,403	8,652	1,899
6	Payyannur	56,730	82,861	9,268	26,131
7	Kalliasseri	59,848	73,542	9,854	13,694

=== General Elections 2014 ===
2014 Indian general election: Kasaragod
Party	Candidate	Votes	%	±%
CPI(M)	P. Karunakaran	384,964	39.52	−6.00
INC	T. Siddique	3,78,043	38.80	0.90
BJP	K. Surendran	1,72,826	17.74	2.93
SDPI	N. U. Abdul Salam	9,713	1.00	
NOTA	None of the Above	6,103	0.63	
AAP	Ambalathara Kunhikrishnan	4,996	0.51	
Margin of victory		6,921	0.71	−6.90
Turnout		9,74,215	78.41	2.28
Registered electors		12,43,730		11.66
CPI(M) hold		Swing	-6.00	

By Assembly Segments
No.	Status (Assembly Constituency)	Votes			Lead
No.	Status (Assembly Constituency)	P. Karunakaran	T. Siddique	K. Surendran	Lead
1	Manjeshwar	29,433	52,459	46,631	5,828
2	Kasaragod	22,827	54,426	41,236	13,190
3	Udma	55,456	56,291	24,584	835
4	Kanhangad	64,669	56,954	23,578	7,715
5	Thrikaripur	65,642	62,001	12,990	3,451
6	Payyanur	75,167	47,025	12,878	28,142
7	Kalliasseri	71,208	48,423	10,758	22,782

=== General Elections 2009 ===
2009 Indian general election: Kasaragod
Party	Candidate	Votes	%	±%
CPI(M)	P. Karunakaran	385,522	45.51	−2.99
INC	Shahida Kamal	3,21,095	37.91	1.41
BJP	K. Surendran	1,25,482	14.81	2.58
BSP	K. H. Madhavi	5,518	0.65	−0.01
Independent	P. K. Raman	5,008	0.59	
Margin of victory		64,427	7.61	−4.40
Turnout		8,47,096	76.15	−1.67
Registered electors		11,13,892		−3.99
CPI(M) hold		Swing	-2.99	

=== General Elections 2004 ===
2004 Indian general election: Kasaragod
Party	Candidate	Votes	%	±%
CPI(M)	P. Karunakaran	437,284	48.50	2.73
INC	N. A. Mohammed	3,29,028	36.49	−5.87
BJP	V. Balakrishna Shetty	1,10,328	12.24	1.22
Independent	P. Sivanandan	7,726	0.86	
BSP	Sukumaran	5,947	0.66	
Independent	M. A. Mohammed	4,652	0.52	
Margin of victory		1,08,256	12.01	8.59
Turnout		9,01,603	77.77	0.08
Registered electors		11,60,134		−3.32
CPI(M) hold		Swing	2.73	

=== General Elections 1999 ===
1999 Indian general election: Kasaragod
Party	Candidate	Votes	%	±%
CPI(M)	T. Govindan	423,564	45.77	0.08
INC	Khader Mangad	3,91,986	42.36	2.24
BJP	P. K. Krishna Das	1,01,934	11.02	−0.88
Margin of victory		31,578	3.41	−2.15
Turnout		9,25,384	77.64	5.09
Registered electors		11,99,964		5.16
CPI(M) hold		Swing	-0.85	

=== General Elections 1998 ===
1998 Indian general election: Kasaragod
Party	Candidate	Votes	%	±%
CPI(M)	T. Govindan	395,910	45.69	−0.94
INC	Khader Mangad	3,47,670	40.12	2.86
BJP	P. K. Krishna Das	1,03,093	11.90	−0.33
INL	N. A. Nellikunnu	17,736	2.05	
Margin of victory		48,240	5.57	−3.80
Turnout		8,66,525	76.41	3.86
Registered electors		11,41,067		1.91
CPI(M) hold		Swing	-0.94	

=== General Elections 1996 ===
1996 Indian general election: Kasaragod
Party	Candidate	Votes	%	±%
CPI(M)	T. Govindan	371,997	46.63	1.81
INC	I. Rama Rai	2,97,267	37.26	−6.33
BJP	P. K. Krishnadas	97,577	12.23	2.34
Independent	T. M. Kunhi	4,446	0.56	
Independent	B. K. Ahammed Kunhi	4,155	0.52	
Margin of victory		74,730	9.37	8.14
Turnout		7,97,847	72.55	−2.23
Registered electors		11,19,715		7.99
CPI(M) hold		Swing	1.81	

=== General Elections 1991 ===
1991 Indian general election: Kasaragod
Party	Candidate	Votes	%	±%
CPI(M)	Ramanna Rai	344,536	44.82	−0.18
INC	K. C. Venugopal	3,35,113	43.59	−1.21
BJP	C. K. Padmanabhan	76,067	9.89	1.19
Independent	L. Ismail	3,590	0.47	
Margin of victory		9,423	1.23	1.03
Turnout		7,68,757	74.78	−4.67
Registered electors		10,36,913		2.64
CPI(M) hold		Swing	-0.18	

=== General Elections 1989 ===
1989 Indian general election: Kasaragod
Party	Candidate	Votes	%	±%
CPI(M)	Ramanna Rai	358,723	44.99	1.42
INC	I. Rama Rai	3,57,177	44.80	−0.74
BJP	C. K. Padmanabhan	69,419	8.71	−1.52
Margin of victory		1,546	0.19	−1.78
Turnout		7,97,296	79.46	1.28
Registered electors		10,10,280		35.57
CPI(M) gain from INC		Swing	-0.55	

=== General Elections 1984 ===
1984 Indian general election: Kasaragod
Party	Candidate	Votes	%	±%
INC	I. Rama Rai	262,904	45.54	
CPI(M)	Balanandan	2,51,535	43.57	−13.38
BJP	K. G. Marar	59,021	10.22	
Independent	N. M. Mohamood	2,787	0.48	
Margin of victory		11,369	1.97	−13.92
Turnout		5,77,331	78.17	9.35
Registered electors		7,45,222		9.84
INC gain from CPI(M)		Swing	-11.41	

=== General Elections 1980 ===
1980 Indian general election: Kasaragod
Party	Candidate	Votes	%	±%
CPI(M)	Ramanna Rai	263,673	56.95	7.51
JP	O. Rajagopal	1,90,086	41.05	
Independent	Pattathil Raghavan	4,360	0.94	
Independent	M. A. Abdulla Mallath	2,492	0.54	
Independent	K. V. Balakrishnan	2,415	0.52	
Margin of victory		73,587	15.89	14.77
Turnout		4,63,026	68.83	−11.19
Registered electors		6,78,476		17.29
CPI(M) gain from INC		Swing	6.38	

=== General Elections 1977 ===
1977 Indian general election: Kasaragod
Party	Candidate	Votes	%	±%
INC	Ramachandran Kadannappalli	227,305	50.56	4.58
CPI(M)	M. Ramanna Rai	2,22,263	49.44	10.35
Margin of victory		5,042	1.12	−5.77
Turnout		4,49,568	80.02	8.23
Registered electors		5,78,474		−0.11
INC hold		Swing	4.58	

=== General Elections 1971 ===
1971 Indian general election: Kasaragod
Party	Candidate	Votes	%	±%
INC	Ramachandran Kadannappalli	189,486	45.98	19.80
CPI(M)	E. K. Nayanar	1,61,082	39.09	−22.38
ABJS	U. Ishwara Bhat	43,564	10.57	
Independent	Pattathil Raghavan	17,930	4.35	
Margin of victory		28,404	6.89	−28.39
Turnout		4,12,062	71.79	−3.33
Registered electors		5,79,127		23.91
INC gain from CPI(M)		Swing	-15.48	

=== General Elections 1967 ===
1967 Indian general election: Kasaragod
Party	Candidate	Votes	%	±%
CPI(M)	A. K. Gopalan	206,480	61.47	New
INC	T. V. C. Nair	87,970	26.19	N/A
ABJS	M. U. Rao	41,471	12.35	▲10.10
Margin of victory		1,18,510	35.28	▲7.77
Turnout		3,35,921	75.12	▲8.12
Registered electors		4,67,371		▲1.52
CPI(M) gain from CPI		Swing	▼0.70	

=== General Elections 1962 ===
1962 Indian general election: Kasaragod
Party	Candidate	Votes	%	±%
CPI	A. K. Gopalan	188,384	62.17	▲11.15
PSP	K. R. Karanth	1,05,021	34.66	N/A
ABJS	Govinda Menoki Illath	6,816	2.25	N/A
Independent	C. V. Ebrayan	2,806	0.93	N/A
Margin of victory		83,363	27.51	▲25.47
Turnout		3,03,027	67.00	10.80
Registered electors		4,60,358		▲2.46
CPI hold		Swing	▲11.15	

=== General Elections 1957 ===
1957 Indian general election: Kasaragod
Party	Candidate	Votes	%	±%
CPI	A. K. Gopalan	128,839	51.02	
Independent	B. Achutha Shenoy	1,23,694	48.98	
Margin of victory		5,145	2.04	
Turnout		2,52,533	56.21	
Registered electors		4,49,300		
CPI win (new seat)				

== See also ==
- Kasaragod district
- Kannur district
- List of constituencies of the Lok Sabha
- 2019 Indian general election in Kerala
