= Splits and Mergers of Kerala Congress =

History of Kerala Congress and its fractions

The Kerala Congress (KEC) has suffered severe divisions and several factions (called groups), and a number of parties have emerged over the years, all claiming the name Kerala Congress in various times in its history. Factions include KEC under P. J. Joseph, KEC(M) under Jose K. Mani, KEC(B) under K. B. Ganesh Kumar, and KEC(J) under Anoop Jacob.

The Group that had retained the official recognition by the Election Commission of India to the name Kerala Congress was the one led by P. J. Joseph from 1979 to 2010 and again from 2021 (which is informally called by the media as KEC(J)).

Release timeline
1964	Kerala Congress
1965
1966
1967
1968
1969
1970
1971
1972
1973
1974
1975
1976
1977	Split - Kerala Congress (Balakrishna Pillai)
1978
1979	Split - Kerala Congress (K. M. Mani)
1980
1981
1982
1983
1984
1985	Merger -: 1. Kerala Congress (P. J. Joseph); 2. Kerala Congress (K. M. Mani); 3. Kerala Congress (Balakrishna Pillai)
1986
1987	Split - Kerala Congress (K. M. Mani) (2nd)
1988
1989	Split - Kerala Congress (Balakrishna Pillai) (2nd)
1990
1991
1992
1993	Split - Kerala Congress (T. M. Jacob)
1994
1995
1996
1997
1998
1999
2000	Split - Indian Federal Democratic Party (P. C. Thomas)
2001
2002
2003
2004	Split - Kerala Congress (Secular)
2005	Merger -: 1. Kerala Congress (P. J. Joseph); 2. Indian Federal Democratic Party (P. C. Thomas); Split - Indian Federal Democratic Party (M. P. George)
2006
2007
2008	Merger -: 1. Kerala Congress (K. M. Mani); 2. Kerala Congress (Secular); Split - Kerala Congress (Socialist)
2009	Merger -: 1. Kerala Congress (Socialist); 2. Janata Dal (United)
2010	Merger -: 1. Kerala Congress (P. J. Joseph); 2. Kerala Congress (K. M. Mani); Split - Kerala Congress (Anti-merger Group)
2011	Kerala Congress dissolved by ECI
2012
2013
2014	Merger -: 1. All India Forward Bloc; 2. Indian Federal Democratic Party (M. P. George); Split -: 1. Forward Bloc Secular (M. P. George); 2. Kerala Congress (Nationalist); 3. Kerala Vikas Congress
2015	Merger -: 1. Forward Bloc Secular (M. P. George); 2. All India Federal Bloc; Split -: 1. Kerala Congress (Secular) (2nd); 2. Kerala Janapaksham (Secular); 3. Kerala Congress (Skaria Thomas); 4. Kerala Congress (Thomas); Merger -: 1. Kerala Congress (Secular) (2nd); 2. Kerala Congress (K. M. Mani); 3. Nationalist Congress Party
2016	Split - Janadhipathya Kerala Congress Revival Of Kerala Congress
2017	Split -: 1. Kerala Vikas Congress (Jose Chemperi); 2. Kerala Vikas Congress (Prakash Kuriakose)
2018	Merger -: 1. Kerala Vikas Congress (Jose Chemperi); 2. Kerala Congress (Balakrishna Pillai)
2019	Split -: 1. Kerala Congress (K. M. Mani); 2. Kerala Congress (P. J. Joseph)
2020
2021	Merger -: 1. Kerala Congress (P. J. Joseph); 2. Kerala Congress; Split - Janadhipathya Kerala Congress
2022
2023
2024	Merger -: 1. Kerala Janapaksham (Secular); 2. Bharatiya Janata Party; Split - Kerala Congress Democratic
2025	Merger -: 1. Kerala Congress Democratic; 2. All India Trinamool Congress

== Active Factions ==
Notable party's formed by leader
Party	Founder	Leader	Alliance
KEC	K. M. George	P. J. Joseph	UDF
KEC(M)	K. M. Mani	Jose K. Mani	LDF
KEC(J)	T. M. Jacob	Anoop Jacob	UDF
KEC(B)	R. Balakrishna Pillai	K. B. Ganesh Kumar	LDF
KEC(ST)	Skariah Thomas	Binoy Joseph	LDF
KEC(N)	Noble Mathew	Kuruvilla Mathews	NDA
KVC(JC)	Jose Chemberi	Prakash Kuriakose	NDA
JKC	Francis George	K. C. Joseph, Antony Raju, P. C. Joseph	LDF

== Defunct Fractions ==
- Kerala Congress (Joseph) led by P. J. Joseph (merged with Kerala Congress)
- Kerala Congress (Thomas) led by P. C. Thomas (merged with Kerala Congress)
- Kerala Janapaksham (Secular) led by P. C. George (merged with Bharatiya Janata Party)
- Janadhipathya Kerala Congress led by Francis George (merged with Kerala Congress)
- Kerala Congress (Nationalist) led by Noble Mathew (merged with Bharatiya Janata Party)
- Kerala Congress (Secular) led by P. C. George (renamed as Kerala Janapaksham (Secular))
- Kerala Congress (Secular) led by T. S. John (merged with Kerala Congress)
- Kerala Vikas Congress (Jose Chemberi) led by Jose Chemberi (merged with Kerala Congress (B))
- Kerala Congress (Anti-merger Group) led by Skaria Thomas split between Kerala Congress (Thomas) and Kerala Congress (Skaria Thomas)
- Kerala Congress (Socialist) (merged with Janata Dal (United))
- Indian Federal Democratic Party led by P. C. Thomas (merged with Kerala Congress)
- Indian Federal Democratic Party (M. P. George) led by M. P. George (merged with All India Forward Bloc)
- Kerala Congress Democratic led by Saji Manjakadambil (merged to All India Trinamool Congress)

== History ==
=== 1977 Split - Kerala Congress (B) ===
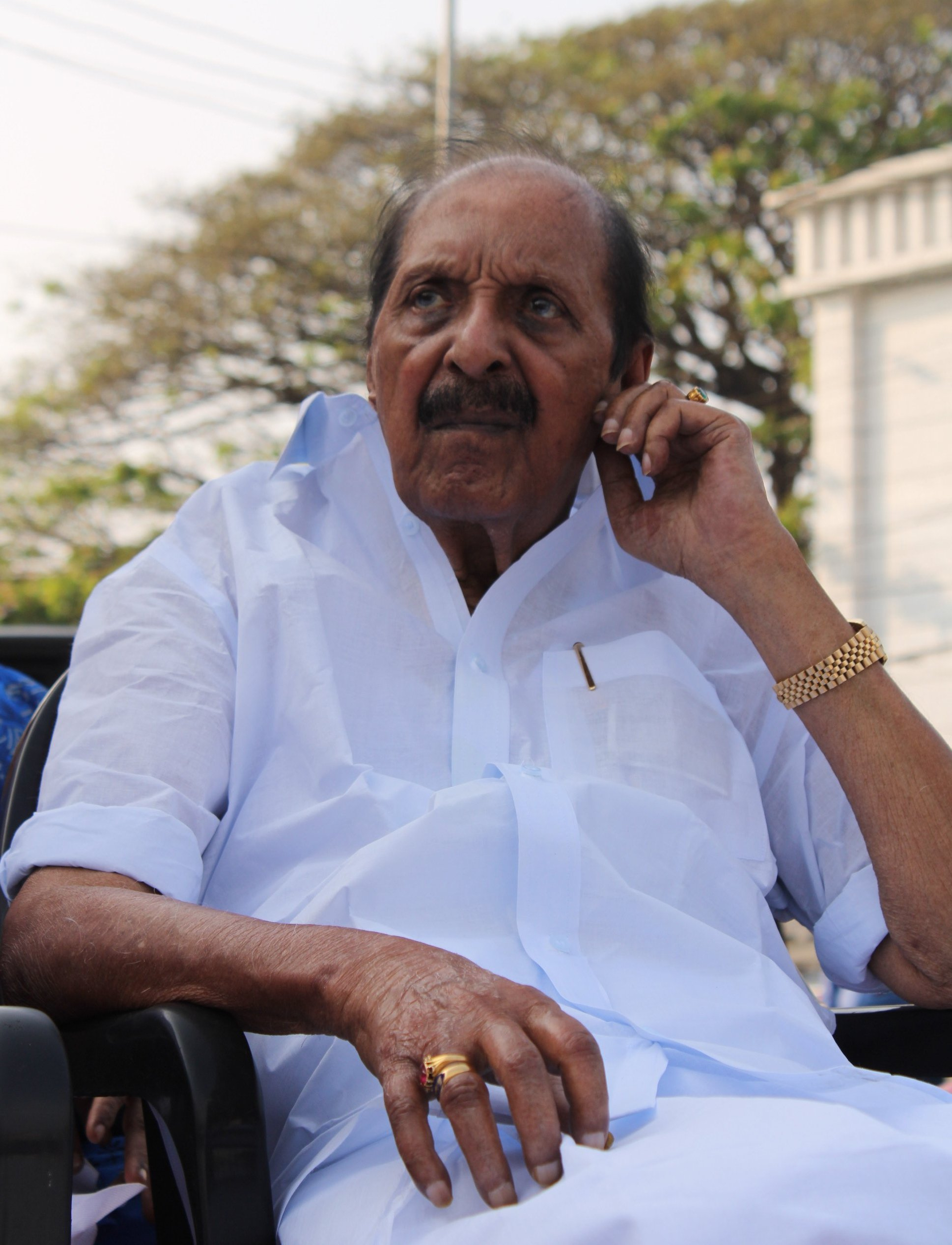
R Balakrishna Pillai

Kerala Congress grew under K. M. George. R. Balakrishna Pillai was another founding leader of the party.

Besides these two leaders, K. M. Mani and P. J. Joseph, the youth front leader rose as prominent leaders of the party. After the death of K. M. George in 1976, there was tussle for control over the party between Pillai and Mani. Pillai felt, as the senior most leader, he would be the de facto leader of the party. However Mani and Joseph had more followers.

In the year 1977, just before the Assembly elections, R. Balakrishna Pillai announced a split from the parent Kerala Congress. This group came to be known as Kerala Congress (Balakrishna Pillai) with R. Balakrishna Pillai as the chairman.

In the Assembly elections of 1977, Kerala Congress stayed with UDF and secured 20 seats where as Pillai group secured 2 seats with LDF.

=== 1979 Split – Kerala Congress (Mani) ===
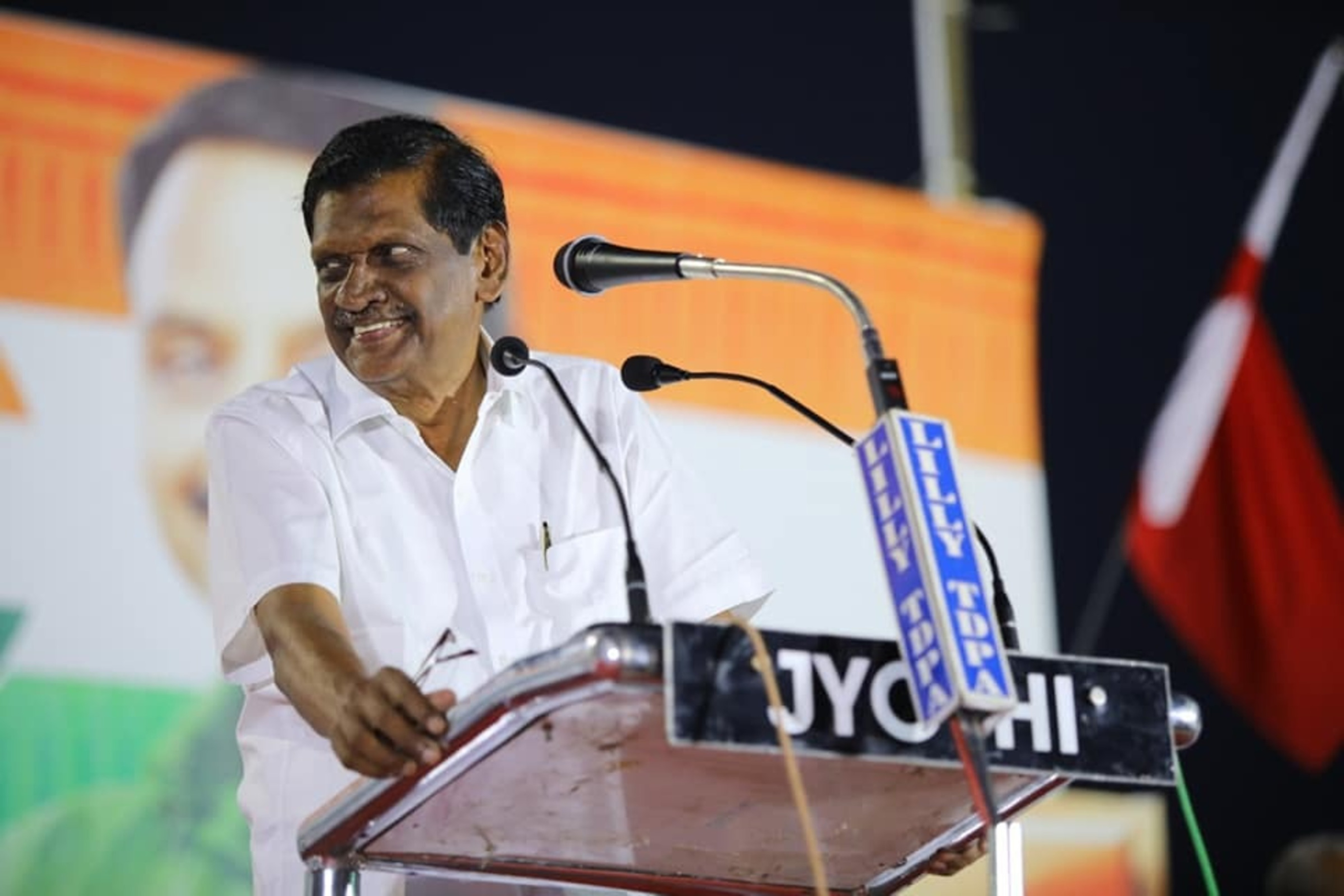
P. J. Joseph

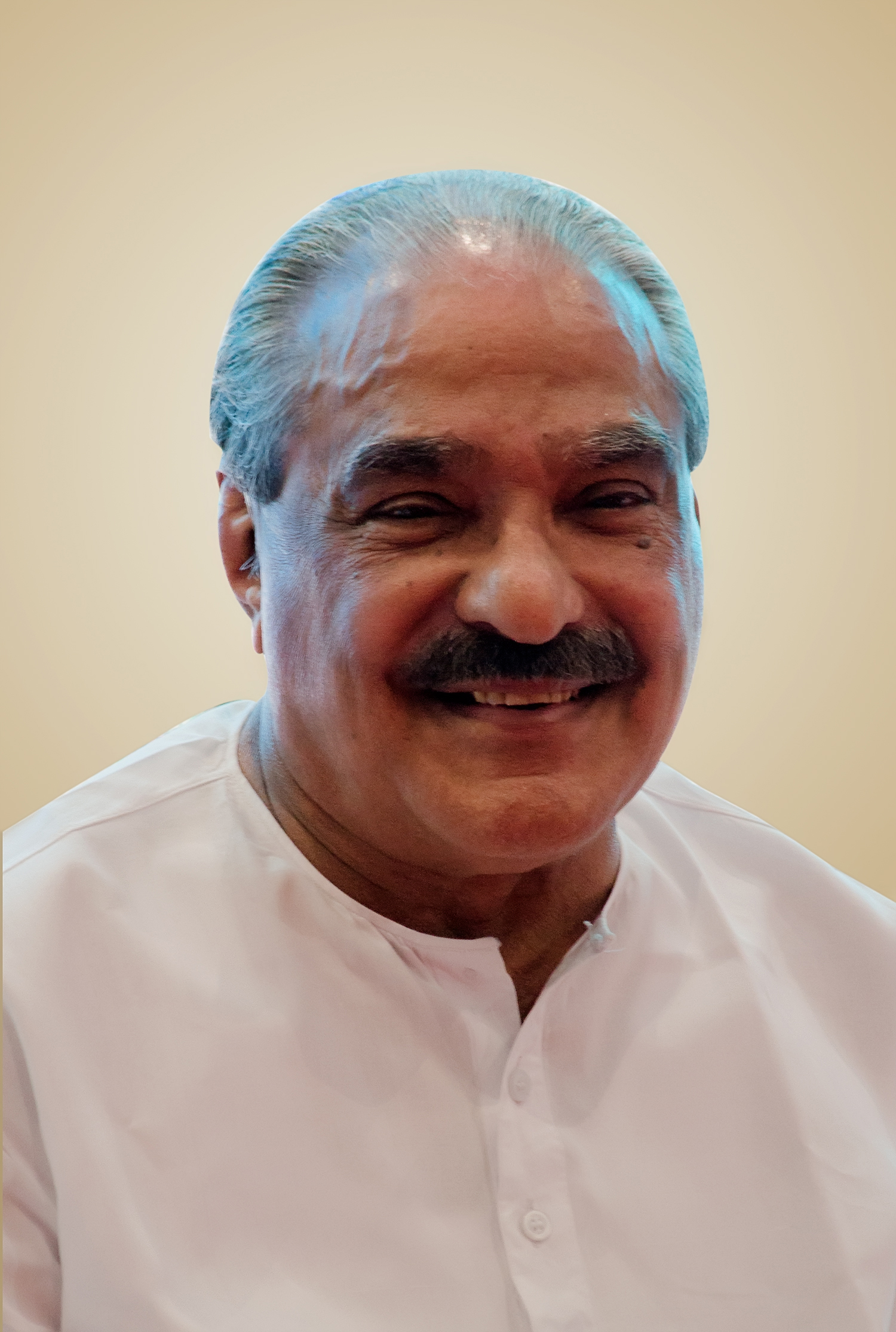
K. M. Mani

Kerala Congress was again split in the year 1979, when veteran Indian politician and the then Minister of Home Affairs in the Kerala government, K. M. Mani announced a split from the parent Kerala Congress, owing to difference of opinions with P. J. Joseph. This first group came to be known as Kerala Congress (Mani) with K. M. Mani as the chairman.

Since then Kerala Congress addressed by the media as Kerala Congress (J) or Kerala Congress (Joseph). Since then P. J. Joseph is the chairman of the party.

In the 1979 Panchayat elections, Kerala Congress (M) stayed with UDF and Kerala Congress under P. J. Joseph stayed with LDF.

In 1980 Assembly elections both factions switched the sides. Kerala Congress (M) moved over to LDF along with Congress Leader A. K. Antony and Kerala Congress under P. J. Joseph moved over to UDF. Later Kerala Congress (M) returned to the UDF. All three factions represented the UDF in the 1982 Assembly election as separate entities. In the 1982 UDF government, K. M. Mani (Finance), P. J. Joseph (Revenue), R. Balakrishna Pilai (Transport), T. M. Jacob (Education) are became ministers.

=== 1985 Merger – Kerala Congress ===
In 1985, the Kerala Congress (M) and Kerala Congress (Balakrishna Pillai) merged with its parent Kerala Congress under P. J. Joseph.

While the two factions realized that the splits are indeed weakening the party. The merged Kerala Congress had 25 MLAs and 4 Ministers.

On 25 May 1985, at a public meeting at Ernakulam, R. Balakrishna Pllai, then a Minister in the Kerala Cabinet, allegedly incited the people to resort to protests like 'Punjab Model' to get the rights of Kerala State. This became a huge controversy and Pillai was forced to resign from the Cabinet and his portfolio was given to K. M. Mani. Later the Kerala High Court gave relief to Pillai.

On this grounds the Kerala Congress under Chairman P. J. Joseph requested the then Chief Minister K. Karunakaran to reindic Pillai to the cabinet. Karunakaran saw this as an opportunity to weaken Kerala Congress and took a stand that for Pillai to be re-indicted to the cabinet Kerala Congress has to surrender the Finance portfolio held by Mani or be content with 3 minister ships.

This caused Mani to be upset and following a sequence of events, the seeds of another split was already sown.

=== 1987 & 1989 Split – Kerala Congress (Mani) And Kerala Congress (Balakrishna Pillai) ===
Just before the Assembly elections of 1987 the differences between the factions under K. M. Mani and P. J. Joseph got wider following the Punjab Model speech issue. The Kerala Congress was again split.

The faction under K. M. Mani was again known as Kerala Congress (Mani). Pillai and Joseph remained as Kerala Congress. T. M. Jacob choose to stay with K. M. Mani.

In general there was a discontent among the Kerala Congress leaders that K. M. Mani was not putting the interests of the party, but a large number of ordinary party men stayed with Mani thinking he is right. A lot of Mani's earlier loyal leadership team including the leaders who were initially chosen by Mani to negotiate with Joseph, like O. Lukose and P. C. Joseph had to finally align with Joseph in the political situation that unfolded. However K. M. Mani still commanded his loyalty in ordinary party men who were unaware of the insider information.

On 1989 R Balakrishnan Pillai Left Kerala Congress and revived Kerala Congress (Balakrishna Pillai).

=== 1993 Split – Kerala Congress (Jacob) ===
On 16 December 1993, then Irrigation Affairs Minister T. M. Jacob along with Johnny Nellore MLA, P. M. Mathew MLA, Mathew Stephen MLA, Oommen Mathew, Vakkanad Radhakrishnan, and George Kunnappuzha split from Kerala Congress (M) citing differences with K. M. Mani.

The newly formed faction was called Kerala Congress (Jacob).

=== Late 2000 splits and mergers - Kerala Congress (Secular) and IFDP ===
Kerala Congress (Mani) member and then sitting Member of Parliament from Muvattupuzha P. C. Thomas, son of P. T. Chacko who having growing differences with K. M. Mani because he was trying to make his son, Jose K. Mani his successor while a lot of other senior members in the party disagreed so.

This caused a split of a group of leaders from Kerala Congress (M) to form Indian Federal Democratic Party a.k.a. IFDP. IFDP tried to form a national level alliance but failed.

Meanwhile, the parent Kerala Congress under P. J. Joseph also split when P. C. George formed the Kerala Congress (Secular) splitting away from parent Kerala Congress under P. J. Joseph.

Later Indian Federal Democratic Party (IFDP), under P. C. Thomas which split from the Kerala Congress (Mani) group, merged with the parent Kerala Congress. A section of the Indian Federal Democratic Party under M. P. George retains its own cadre (As usual in every Kerala Congress merger).

In October 2009, Kerala Congress (Secular) under P. C. George, which split from the Parent party, merged with the Mani group. A section of the Kerala Congress (Secular) denied the merger and began to be known as Kerala Congress (Socialist). Kerala Congress (Socialist) soon got dissolved when it merged with the Janata Dal (Secular).

=== Moves for United Kerala Congress ===
There were several unofficial moves for bringing back the various splinter groups together under one umbrella ever since the first split of 1979. In 2007, Kerala Congress (Mani), Kerala Congress (Secular), Kerala Congress (Balakrishna Pillai), and Kerala Congress (Jacob) tried to form a united forum, but this was unsuccessful.

=== Merger of Kerala Congress (Mani) And Kerala Congress (Joseph) ===
P. J. Joseph announced on 30 April 2010 the intention of his group to leave the Left Democratic Front (LDF), of which his group had been a constituent for two decades, and merge with the group led by K. M. Mani to form a united Kerala Congress.

K. M. Mani reciprocated shortly thereafter, welcoming the exit of the Joseph group from the LDF.

This reunited the two factions which had split in 1979 to form a single Kerala Congress, and made it the largest constituent of the United Democratic Front (UDF) after the Indian National Congress.

However, other factions including Kerala Congress (Balakrishna Pillai), kept out of this merger. A faction under P. C. Thomas also dissented and stayed back with the Left Democratic Front, forming the Kerala Congress (Anti-merger Group).

During the 2011 Kerala Assembly elections, both P. J. Joseph and P. C. Thomas claimed the party symbol Bicycle and the party name Kerala Congress. Registration of the name Kerala Congress was temporarily frozen by the Election Commission as the arguments were inconclusive.

The Joseph group which united with the Mani group was asked to adopt the name of Kerala Congress (M) and its symbol Two Leaves. The Thomas group was allotted the name Kerala Congress (Anti-merger Group) and the symbol Chair.

So Kerala Congress became dissolved party for the first time since 2011.

==== 2014 Lok Sabha Election ====
After the merger with Joseph Group, Kerala Congress (Mani) made claims to the Idukki Lok Sabha seat within the United Democratic Front for the 2014 elections.

There was a strong sentiment against the sitting congress MP P. T. Thomas because of his stand on the Kasturirangan Report. Francis George, who was earlier MP from the constituency, was very vocal against the Kasturirangan Report and had mobilized the people in protest along with several other banners. The Congress high command denied seat to Kerala Congress and Dean Kuriakose was announced as the UDF candidate.

The LDF tactically didn't announce its candidate in the hope of pulling over a winnable candidate like Francis George or P. C. Joseph from Kerala Congress, who were spearheading the protests against the Kasturirangan Report. But Francis George openly refused the offer to contest under the LDF banner.

Finally Mr. Joice George, an advocate of 'Highrange Samrakshana Samiti', the forum set up against Kasturirangan Report, was fielded as LDF candidate and he went on to win the election banking on the sentiment against Kasturirangan Report.

Just before 2014 Lok Sabha elections, on 11 March 2014, a few members led by Noble Mathew left Kerala Congress (Mani) and form new fractional party named as Kerala Congress (Nationalist). This party is in alliance with BJP led National Democratic Alliance.

=== 2015 Split - Revival of Kerala Congress (Secular) And Kerala Janapaksham (Secular) ===
On 2015 P. C. George left Kerala Congress (M) and Revived Kerala Congress (Secular) However, before 2016 Kerala Legislative Assembly election P. C. George got ousted from the party. All members of Kerala Congress (Secular) merged with Kerala Congress (M), Nationalist Congress Party and other Kerala Congress Parties.

So P. C. George formed Kerala Janapaksham (Secular).

=== Revival of Kerala Congress (2016) ===
On 2015 Kerala Congress (Anti-merger Group) split and formed Kerala Congress (Skaria Thomas) fraction led by Skaria Thomas and Kerala Congress (Thomas) led by P. C. Thomas. On 2016 Thomas received permission from Election commission of India to use Kerala Congress name and its symbol (wherever the party was recognized as state or national party). So Thomas dissolved Kerala Congress (Thomas) and revived parent Kerala Congress.

So Kerala Congress again became an active political party in Kerala from 2016.

=== 2016 Split - Janadhipathya Kerala Congress ===
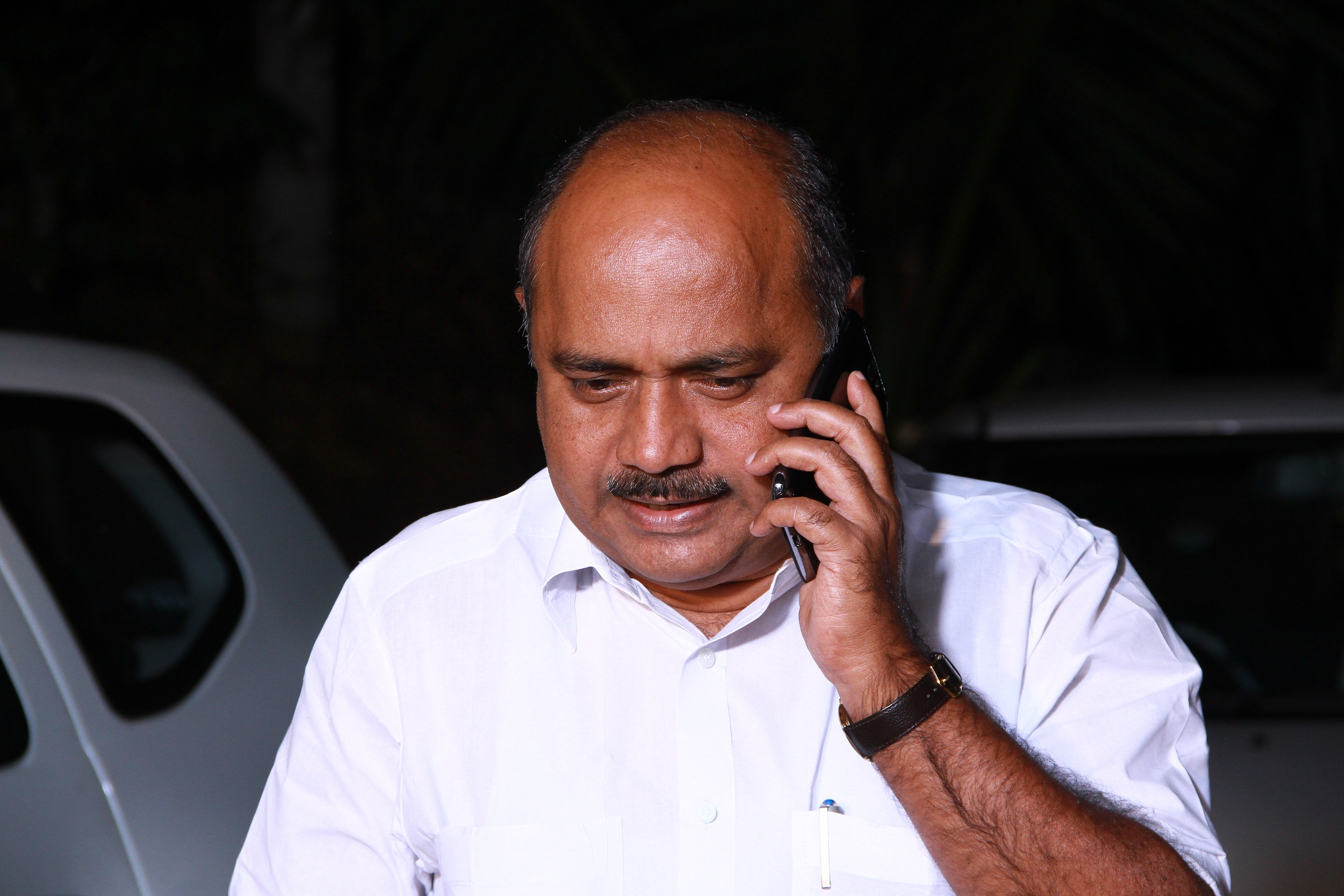
Francis George, Kerala Congress leader from Muvattupuzha and the son of K. M. George, founder of Kerala Congress

On 2016 before Kerala assembly elections K. Francis George, son of founder of Kerala Congress K. M. George, along with Antony Raju and Dr. K C Joseph left Kerala Congress (Mani) and formed Janadhipathya Kerala Congress.

=== 2019 Split - Revival of Kerala Congress (Joseph) ===
A power struggle erupted in the party after the death of Kerala Congress (M) chairman K. M. Mani. One faction was led by his son Jose K. Mani and another was led by senior leader P. J. Joseph. The Election Commission intervened and it ruled in favor of Jose K Mani. The commission passed a verdict recognizing the faction led by Jose K. Mani as the Kerala Congress (M). This was challenged by P. J. Joseph in Kerala High Court and he was granted an interim stay order. The Jose faction approached the Supreme Court of India and it agreed with the Election Commission's verdict.

Due to the disputes with Jose K. Mani fraction in 2019 June, P. J. Joseph and C. F. Thomas revived Kerala Congress (J) by splitting from Kerala Congress (M).

== P. J. Joseph rejoins Kerala Congress ==
On 17 March 2021, P. J. Joseph announced that his party Kerala Congress (Joseph) has merged with Kerala Congress led by P. C. Thomas to form a new party,

P.J Joseph Became chairman of Kerala Congress after 11 years and P. C. Thomas became deputy chairman. The new party currently haven't any bracket with its name so the new party will be called Kerala Congress.

After resigning from the party over allegations of discrimination, rebel leaders of the Kerala Congress, led by Saji Manjakadambil, launched a new political entity – Kerala Congress Democratic. The newly formed party, aiming to connect with the agricultural community in Central Travancore, has formally declared its allegiance to the National Democratic Alliance (NDA).

== Notable leaders of Kerala Congress parties ==
=== Current leaders ===
Office Bearer	Position	Current Group
Jose K. Mani	Chairman, MP (Rajya Sabha)	Kerala Congress (M)
K. B. Ganesh Kumar	Cabinet Minister	Kerala Congress (B)
Dr. N. Jayaraj	Chief Whip	Kerala Congress (M)
Roshy Augustine	Cabinet Minister	Kerala Congress (M)
Thomas Chazhikadan	Chairman	Kerala Congress (M)
Adv. Elizabeth Mammen Mathai	General Secretary	Kerala Congress (M)
P. T. Jose	General Secretary	Kerala Congress (M)
Adv. Job Michael	MLA (Kerala Legislative Assembly)	Kerala Congress (M)
P. J. Joseph	Chairman, MLA (Kerala Legislative Assembly	Kerala Congress
P. C. Thomas	Working Chairman	Kerala Congress
Monce Joseph	Executive Chairman, MLA (Kerala Legislative Assembly)	Kerala Congress
Anoop Jacob	Leader, MLA (Kerala Legislative Assembly)	Kerala Congress (Jacob)
K. Francis George	Deputy Chairman	Kerala Congress

=== Other notable leaders ===
- K. M. George Muvattupuzha, Transport Minister, Founder Chairman
- Mathachan Kuruvinakunnel Founder
- R. Balakrishna Pillai Mavelikara/Kottarakkara, Transport, Electricity Minister, Founder General Secretary
- K. M. Mani, Pala, Home, Finance, Irrigation, Revenue, Law Minister
- C. F. Thomas, Changanacherry, Kottayam, Khadi & Rural Development Minister.
- E. John Jacob, Thiruvalla, Pathanamthitta, Food and Civil Supplies Minister.
- M V Mani, Ex. MLA - Angamaly & Kothamangalam.
- Prof. K. Narayana Kurup, Vazhoor, Kottayam, Transport Minister, Deputy Speaker.
- T. M. Jacob, Piravom/Kothamangalam, Ernakulam, Education, Irrigation, Food and Civil Supplies Minister.
- Prof. K. A Mathew, Ranni/Kallooppara, Pathanamthitta, Minister for Industries and Forest.
- T. S. John, Kallooppara, Pathanamthitta, Transport Minister, Speaker.
- K. R Saraswathy Amma, Ex. MLA, Chengannur, Alleppey.
- Vayala Idikkula, Ex. MLA, Ranny/Pathanamthitta, Pathanamthitta.
- T. Krishnan, Ex. MLA, Thrikadavoor (Kunnathur), Kollam.
- Dr. K. George Thomas, Ex. MLA, Kallooppara, Pathanamthitta.
- P. K Ittoop, Ex. MLA, Chalakudy, Thrissur.
- P. Chacko, Ex. MLA, Thiruvalla, Pathanamthitta.
- Prof. Oommen Mathew, Ex. MLA, Kuttanadu, Alleppey.
- George Joseph Mundakkan, Ex. MP, Muvattupuzha, Ernakulam.
- Varkey George, Ex. MP, Kottayam.
- K.V Kurian, Ex. MLA, Kanjirapally, Kottayam.
- Eapen Varghese, Ex. MLA, Palluruthy, Ernakulam.
- O. Lukose, Ex. MLA, Kaduthuruthy, Kottayam.
- E.J. Lukose, Ex. MLA, Ettumanoor, Kottayam.
- A.T. Pathrose, Ex. MLA, Muvattupuzha, Ernakulam.
- V.V. Joseph, Ex. MLA, Muvattupuzha, Ernakulam.
- N. Bhaskaran Nair, Ex. MLA, Changanacherry, Kottayam.
- Adv. Sam Oommen, Ex. MLA, Punalur, Kollam.
- Adv. Thomas Kallampally, Ex. MLA, Kanjirapally, Kottayam.
- Adv. Mammen Mathai, Ex. MLA, Thiruvalla, Pathanamthitta.
- Dr. George Mathew, Ex. MLA, Aranmula, Pathanamthitta.
- Chathannoor S. Thankappan Pillai, Ex. MLA, Chathannoor, Kollam.
- T A Darmaraja Ayyer, Ex. MLA, Thrissur.
- M I Markose, Ex. MLA, Kothamangalam, Ernakulam.
- K. Mohandas, Ex. MP, Mukundapuram(Chalakudy), Thrissur.
- Thomas John, Ex. MLA, Kuttanadu, Alleppey.
- V T Sebastian, Ex. MLA Idukki/Udumbanchola, Idukki.
- A. George, Ex. MLA Pathanapuram, Kollam.
- C V Jacob, Ex. MLA, Cherthala, Allepppey
- K K Gopalan Nair, Ex. MLA, Adoor, Pathanamthitta.
- George Thomas, Ex. MLA, Kalloopara, Pathanathitta
- C A Mathew, Ex. MLA, Thodupuzha, Idukki.
