= Kerala Congress (disambiguation) =

Kerala Congress may refer to: Committee of Kerala INC, See Kerala Pradesh Congress Committee Other Parties

== Active Parties ==
- Kerala Congress
- Kerala Congress (M)
- Kerala Congress (B)
- Kerala Congress (Jacob)
- Janadhipathya Kerala Congress
- Kerala Congress (Skaria Thomas)
- Kerala Congress (Nationalist)
- Kerala Congress (Secular)
- Kerala Vikas Congress
- Kerala Kamaraj Congress

== Defunct Parties ==
- Kerala Congress Democratic
- Aikya Kerala Congress
- Kerala Congress (Anti-merger Group)
- Kerala Congress (Joseph)
- Kerala Congress (Thomas)
- Kerala Janapaksham (Secular)
