= List of Indian National Congress breakaway parties =

Since India gained independence in 1947, the Indian National Congress (INC) has seen a number of splits and breakaway factions. Some of the breakaway organisations have survived as independent parties, some have become defunct, while others have merged with the parent party or other political parties.

== List of breakaway parties ==
Year	Party	Abbr.	Leader	Region	Status
1915	Akhil Bharatiya Hindu Mahasabha	ABHM	Madan Mohan Malviya	National	active
1923	Swaraj Party	SP	Chittaranjan Das, Motilal Nehru	Bengal Presidency	defunct merged with INC
1939	All India Forward Bloc	AIFB	Sardul Singh Caveeshar; Sheel Bhadra Yagee; Subhas Chandra Bose	National	active
1947	Pakistan National Congress	PNC	Kiran Shankar Roy	Pakistan	defunct
1951	Kisan Mazdoor Praja Party	KMPP	Jivatram Kripalani	Madras State; Vindhya Pradesh	defunct merged with Praja Socialist Party
1951	Hyderabad State Praja Party		Tanguturi Prakasam; N. G. Ranga	Hyderabad State	defunct merged with Kisan Mazdoor Praja Party
1951	Saurashtra Khedut Sangh		Narsinhbhai Dadhaniya; Ratibhai Ukabhai	Saurashtra State	defunct merged with Swatantra Party
1956	Indian National Democratic Congress		C. Rajagopalachari	Madras State	defunct merged with Swatantra Party
1959	Swatantra Party		C. Rajagopalachari; N. G. Ranga	Bihar; Rajasthan; Gujarat; Orissa	defunct merged with Bharatiya Kranti Dal
1964	Kerala Congress		K. M. George	Kerala	active as the original party has various factions, which have split off from it such as Kerala Congress (M), Kerala Congress (Jacob), Kerala Congress (B), Kerala Congress (Democratic), Kerala Congress (Skaria Thomas), Kerala Congress (Thomas), Kerala Congress (Nationalist)
1966	Orissa Jana Congress		Harekrushna Mahatab	Odisha	defunct merged with Janata Party
1967	Bangla Congress		Ajoy Mukherjee	West Bengal	defunct merged with INC
1967	Vishal Haryana Party		Birender Singh	Haryana	defunct merged with INC
1967	Bharatiya Kranti Dal		Charan Singh	Uttar Pradesh	defunct merged with Bharatiya Lok Dal
1968	Manipur Peoples Party		Mohammed Alimuddin	Manipur	active
1969	Indian National Congress (R)		Indira Gandhi	National	defunct merged with INC
1969	Indian National Congress (Organisation)		K. Kamaraj	National	defunct merged with Janata Party
1969	Utkal Congress		Biju Patnaik	Odisha	defunct merged with Janata Party
1969	Telangana Praja Samithi		Marri Chenna Reddy	Andhra Pradesh	defunct merged with INC
1971	Biplobi Bangla Congress		Sukumar Roy	West Bengal	active part of the Left Front (West Bengal)
1971	Bangladesh National Congress		Manoranjan Dhar	Bangladesh	defunct
1977	Congress for Democracy		Jagjivan Ram	National	defunct merged with Janata party
1978	Indian National Congress (Indira)		Indira Gandhi	National	defunct merged with INC
1979	Indian National Congress (Urs)		D. Devaraj Urs	Karnataka; Maharashtra; Goa	defunct become Indian National Congress (Socialist)
1980	Congress (A)		A. K. Antony	Kerala	defunct merged with INC
1981	Indian National Congress (Socialist)		Sharad Pawar	Karnataka; Maharashtra; Goa	defunct merged with INC
1981	Indian National Congress (Jagjivan)		Jagjivan Ram	Bihar	defunct
1984	Indian Congress (Socialist) - Sarat Chandra Sinha		Sarat Chandra Sinha	Assam	defunct Major faction of the party merged with Nationalist Congress Party. However a residual faction still exists in Kerala as a part of Left Front.
1986	Rashtriya Samajwadi Congress		Pranab Mukherjee	West Bengal	defunct merged with INC
1988	Thamizhaga Munnetra Munnani		Sivaji Ganesan	Tamil Nadu	defunct merged with Janata Dal
1990	Haryana Vikas Party		Bansi Lal	Haryana	defunct merged with INC in 2004
1994	All India Indira Congress (Tiwari)		Narayan Datt Tiwari; Arjun Singh; Natwar Singh; Rangarajan Kumaramangalam	Uttar Pradesh	defunct merged with INC
1994	Karnataka Congress Party		Bangarappa	Karnataka	defunct merged with INC
1994	Tamizhaga Rajiv Congress		Vazhapadi Ramamurthy	Tamil Nadu	defunct merged with INC
1996	Karnataka Vikas Party		Bangarappa	Karnataka	defunct merged with INC
1996	Arunachal Congress		Gegong Apang	Arunachal Pradesh	defunct merged with INC
1996; 2014	Tamil Maanila Congress (Moopanar)		G. K. Moopanar 1996-2001; G. K. Vasan (2014–present)	Tamil Nadu	active merged with INC in 2001 split again from INC in 2014
1996	Madhya Pradesh Vikas Congress		Madhavrao Scindia	Madhya Pradesh	defunct merged with INC
1997	Tamil Nadu Makkal Congress		Vazhapadi Ramamurthy	Tamil Nadu	defunct
1997	Himachal Vikas Congress		Sukh Ram	Himachal Pradesh	defunct merged with INC
1997	Manipur State Congress Party		Wahengbam Nipamacha Singh	Manipur	defunct merged with RJD
1998	All India Trinamool Congress	TMC, AITC	Mamata Banerjee	West Bengal	Seized by ECI; Broke into 2 Factions-Mamata All India Trinamool Congress and Democratic Trinamool Congress led by Mamata Banerjee and Ritabrata Banerjee respectively.
1998	Goa Rajiv Congress Party		Francis de Souza	Goa	defunct merged with Nationalist Congress Party
1998	Arunachal Congress (Mithi)		Mukut Mithi	Arunachal Pradesh	defunct merged with INC
1998	All India Indira Congress (Secular)		Shish Ram Ola	Rajasthan	defunct merged with INC
1998	Maharashtra Vikas Aghadi		Suresh Kalmadi	Maharashtra	defunct merged with INC
1999	Bharatiya Jan Congress		Jagannath Mishra	Bihar	defunct merged with Nationalist Congress Party
1999	Nationalist Congress Party		Sharad Pawar; P.A. Sangma; Tariq Anwar	Maharashtra; Meghalaya; Kerala	active
1999	Jammu and Kashmir Peoples Democratic Party		Mufti Mohammad Sayeed	Jammu and Kashmir	active
2000	Goa People's Congress		Francisco Sardinha	Goa	defunct merged with INC
2001	Congress Jananayaka Peravai		P. Chidambaram	Tamil Nadu	defunct formed as TMCJP, merged with inc
2001	Thondar Congress		Kumari Ananthan	Tamil Nadu	defunct merged with INC
2001	Pondicherry Makkal Congress		P. Kannan	Puducherry	defunct
2002	Vidarbha Janata Congress		Jambuwantrao Dhote	Maharashtra	active
2002	Indian National Congress (Sheik Hassan)		Sheik Hassan	Goa	defunct merged with Bharatiya Janata Party
2002	Gujarat Janata Congress		Chhabildas Mehta	Gujarat	defunct merged with NCP
2003	Congress (Dolo)		Kameng Dolo	Arunachal Pradesh	defunct merged with Bharatiya Janata Party
2003	Nagaland People's Front		Neiphiu Rio	Nagaland	active
2005	Pondicherry Munnetra Congress		P. Kannan	Puducherry	defunct merged with INC
2005	Democratic Indira Congress (Karunakaran)		K. Karunakaran	Kerala	defunct merged with Nationalist Congress Party and a large number of workers returned to the INC with K. Karunakaran later his son K. Muraleedharan also returned to INC
2007	Haryana Janhit Congress (BL)		Kuldeep Bishnoi	Haryana	merged with INC
2008	Pragatisheel Indira Congress (PIC)		Somendra Nath Mitra	West Bengal	defunct merged with All India Trinamool Congress
2011	Yuvajana Sramika Rythu Congress Party		Y. S. Jagan Mohan Reddy	Andhra Pradesh	active
2011	All India N.R Congress		N. Rangaswamy	Puducherry	active
2014	Jai Samaikyandhra Party		Nallari Kiran Kumar Reddy	Andhra Pradesh	defunct merged with INC
2016	Chhattisgarh Janata Congress		Ajit Jogi	Chhattisgarh	active
2019	Makkal Munnetra Congress		P. Kannan	Puducherry	defunct
2021	Punjab Lok Congress		Captain Amarinder Singh	Punjab	defunct merged with Bharatiya Janata Party
2022	Democratic Progressive Azad Party		Gulam Nabi Azad	Jammu and Kashmir	active

== See also ==
- Dravidian parties
- List of chief ministers from the Indian National Congress
- List of Janata Dal breakaway parties
- Splits and Mergers of Kerala Congress
