= Poonjar Assembly constituency =

Constituency of the Kerala legislative assembly in India

Poonjar
- Constituency No. 101 for the Kerala Legislative Assembly
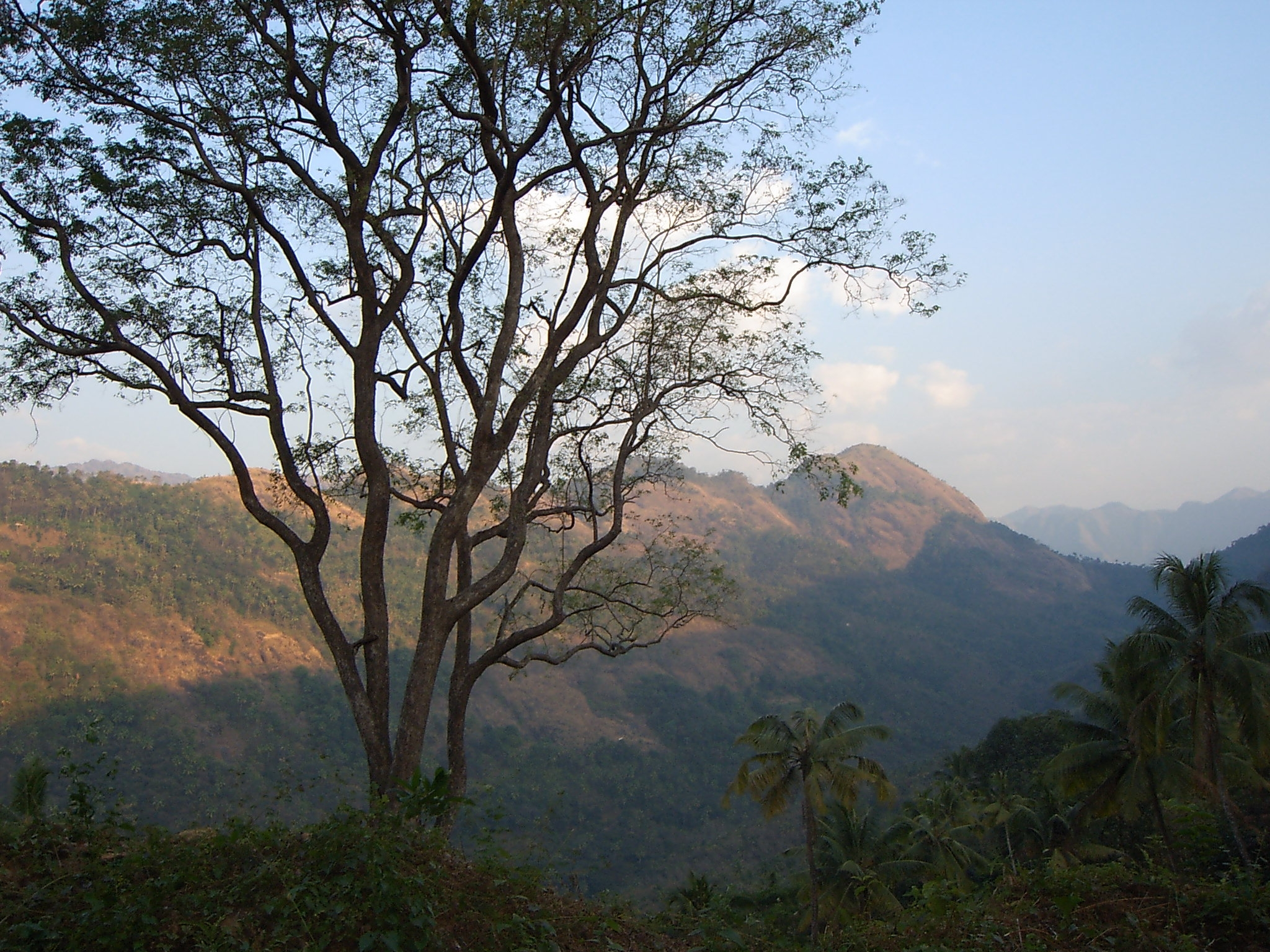
- Kaippally, the hilly region of Poonjar

Constituency details
- Country: India
- Region: South India
- State: Kerala
- District: Kottayam
- Established: 1957
- Total electors: 3,00,000 (2021)
- Reservation: None

Member of Legislative Assembly
- 16th Kerala Legislative Assembly
- Incumbent Sebastian M. J.
- Party: Indian National Congress
- Elected year: 2026

Poonjar State assembly constituency is one of the 140 state legislative assembly constituencies in Kerala in southern India. It is also one of the seven state legislative assembly constituencies included in Pathanamthitta Lok Sabha constituency. As of the 2026 Assembly elections, the current MLA is M.J Sebastian of INC.

== Local self-governed segments ==
Poonjar Assembly constituency is composed of the following local self-governed segments:

Sl no.	Name	Status (Grama panchayat/Municipality)	Taluk
1	Erattupetta	Municipality	Meenachil
2	Poonjar	Grama panchayat	Meenachil
3	Poonjar Thekkekara	Grama panchayat	Meenachil
4	Teekoy	Grama panchayat	Meenachil
5	Thidanad	Grama panchayat	Meenachil
6	Erumely	Grama panchayat	Kanjirappally
7	Koottickal	Grama panchayat	Kanjirappally
8	Koruthodu	Grama panchayat	Kanjirappally
9	Mundakayam	Grama panchayat	Kanjirappally
10	Parathodu	Grama panchayat	Kanjirappally

== Members of the Legislative Assembly ==
The following list contains all members of Kerala Legislative Assembly who have represented the constituency:

Key

INC Independent KC(M) KEC JD

Election	Niyama Sabha	Member	Party
1957	1st	T. A. Thomman	Indian National Congress
1960	2nd	T. A. Thomman	Indian National Congress
1967	3rd	K. M. George	Kerala Congress
1970	4th	K. M. George	Kerala Congress
1977	5th	V. J. Joseph	Kerala Congress
1980	6th	P. C. George	Kerala Congress
1982	7th	P. C. George	Kerala Congress
1987	8th	N. M. Joseph	Janata Dal
1991	9th	Joy Abraham	Kerala Congress
1996	10th	P. C. George	Kerala Congress
2001	11th	P. C. George	Kerala Congress
2006	12th	P. C. George	Kerala Congress
2011	13th	P. C. George	Kerala Congress
2016	14th	P. C. George	Independent
2021	15th	Sebastian Kulathunkal	Kerala Congress
2026	16th	Adv. Sebastian M. J.	Indian National Congress

== Election results ==
=== 2026 ===
2026 Kerala Legislative Assembly election: Poonjar
Party	Candidate	Votes	%	±%
INC	Adv. Sebastian M. J.	56,900	40.30	▲15.54
KC(M)	Sebastian Kulathunkal	50,207	34.67	▼7.27
BJP	P. C. George	36,172	24.98	▼6.13
BSP	Shiny A C	603	0.42	▼0.01
NOTA	None of the above	498	0.34	▲0.09
Independent	Abhiram Babu	205	0.14	−
Independent	Mayamol K P	136	0.09	−
Independent	Santhosh Joseph	73	0.05	−
Margin of victory		6,693	4.62	▼7.85
Turnout		1,44,794	78.34	▲4.36
INC gain from KC(M)		Swing		

=== 2021 ===
There were 1,89,091 registered voters in the constituency for the 2021 election.

2021 Kerala Legislative Assembly election: Poonjar
Party	Candidate	Votes	%	±%
KC(M)	Sebastian Kulathunkal	58,668	41.94	▲26.66
KJ (S)	P. C. George	41,851	29.99	▼13.72
INC	Tomy Kallany	34,633	24.76	▲0.20
BDJS	M. P Sen	2,965	2.12	▼11.58
BSP	Ancy George	596	0.43	
NOTA	None of the above	345	0.25	
Independent	M. V George	278	0.2	
Independent	Abdu Samad	259	0.19	−
Independent	Albin Mathew	205	0.15	−
Independent	Tomy Chemarapallil	94	0.07	
Margin of victory		16,581	11.85%	▲7.25
Turnout		1,39,894	73.98	▼5.41
KC(M) gain from Independent		Swing	▲26.66	

|}

=== 2016 ===
There were 1,83,590 registered voters in the constituency for the 2016 Kerala Assembly election.

2016 Kerala Legislative Assembly election: Poonjar
Party	Candidate	Votes	%	±%
Independent	P. C. George	63,621	43.65	−
KC(M)	Georgekutty Augustine	35,800	24.56	▼26.21
JKC	P. C. Joseph Ponnattu	22,270	15.28	▼22.16
BDJS	M. R. Ullas	19,966	13.70	▲9.45
WPOI	P. A. Abdul Hakkim	804	0.55	−
PDP	Nishad Nadakkal	530	0.36	−
Independent	Sainulladeen	525	0.36	−
Independent	Indulekha Joseph	397	0.27	−
Independent	Georgekutty Sebastan	375	0.26	−
NOTA	None of the above	313	0.21	−
Independent	Joseph P. C. Purathayil	234	0.16	−
Independent	Siyam P. Ashraf	194	0.13	
Independent	George Chacko	166	0.11	
SUCI(C)	Raju Vattapara	148	0.10	▼0.11
Independent	James Joseph	143	0.10	−
KJ	Santhosh Chennadu	96	0.07	−
CPI(M-L)	T. M. Surendran	94	0.06	−
Independent	Abraham	77	0.05	−
Margin of victory		27,821	19.10	▲5.77
Turnout		1,45,753	79.39	▲9.24
Independent gain from KC(M)		Swing		

=== 2011 ===
There were 1,67,928 registered voters in the constituency for the 2011 election.

2011 Kerala Legislative Assembly election: Poonjar
Party	Candidate	Votes	%	±%
KC(M)	P. C. George	59,809	50.77	▲6.86
LDF	Mohan Thomas	44,105	37.44	▼14.62
BJP	K. M. Santhosh Kumar	5,010	4.25	▲2.49
SDPI	V. M. Sulaiman Moulavi	3,579	3.04	−
BSP	P. P. Joshy	2,956	2.51	−
Independent	Sivan	524	0.44	−
Independent	P. K. Divakaran	455	0.39	−
Independent	P. C. George	417	0.35	−
Independent	K. Rajappan	280	0.24	−
SUCI(C)	Raju Vattapara	243	0.21	−
Independent	Mano George	192	0.16	
Independent	Anoop Bhaskaran	132	0.11	
Independent	Anil Mathew	107	0.09	
Margin of victory		14,984	13.33	▲5.20
Turnout		1,17,809	70.15	▼4.66
KC(M) gain from Kerala Congress (Secular)		Swing	▲6.86	

=== 2006 ===
There were 1,24,825 registered voters in the constituency for the 2006 election.

2006 Kerala Legislative Assembly election: Poonjar
Party	Candidate	Votes	%	±%
Kerala Congress (Secular)	P. C. George	48,878	52.06	▲1.93
KC(M)	T. V. Abraham	41,158	43.91	▼4.26
BJP	T. S. Jayakumar	1,652	1.76	
United India Peoples Party	P. C. George Padinjarepur	736	0.79	
Independent	P. V. Abraham	372	0.40	
Independent	Saji Abraham	314	0.34	
Independent	P. C. George Plakkuttam	293	0.31	
Independent	Rajendra Prasad	287	0.31	
Independent	T. S. Abraham	122	0.13	
Rejected	Rejected & Missing Votes	21		
Margin of victory		7,637	8.13	▲6.18
Turnout		93,750	74.81	▼2.41
LDF hold		Swing	▲1.93	

=== 2001 ===
There were 1,25,310 registered voters in the constituency for the 2001 election.

2001 Kerala Legislative Assembly election: Poonjar
Party	Candidate	Votes	%	±%
KEC	P. C. George	48,449	50.13	
KC(M)	T. V. Abraham	46,605	48.17	
Independent	P. C. George	1,047	1.08	
JD(U)	Rajesh Abraham Kallarackal	600	0.62	
Rejected	Rejected & Missing Votes	17		
Margin of victory		1,894	1.95	
Turnout		96,768	77.22	
KEC hold		Swing		

== See also ==
- Poonjar
- Kottayam district
- List of constituencies of the Kerala Legislative Assembly
- 2016 Kerala Legislative Assembly election
