= Kerala Janapaksham (Secular) =

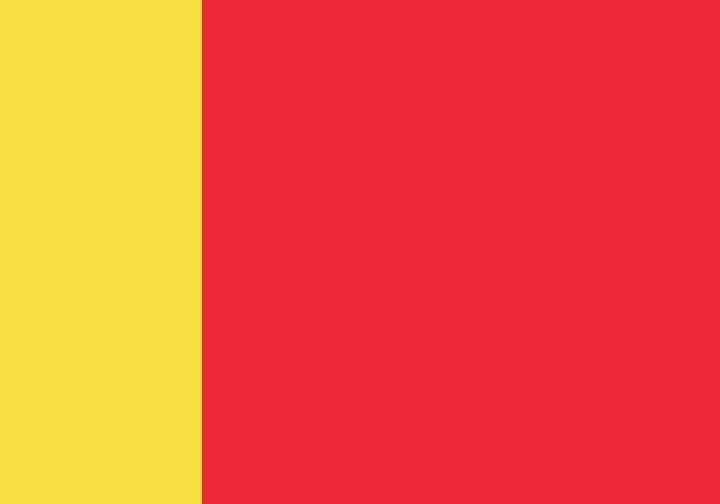
- Abbreviation: KJ(S)
- Chairperson: P. C. George
- Founder: P. C. George
- Founded: 8 May 2019; 7 years ago
- Registered: registered
- Dissolved: 31 January 2024; 2 years ago
- Split from: Kerala Congress (Secular)
- Preceded by: Kerala Janapaksham
- Merged into: Bharatiya Janata Party
- Headquarters: T.C. 16/882(13), Sreekrishna Nagar, Jagathy P.O, Thiruvananthapuram, Kerala- 695014
- Political position: Centre
- Colors: yellow
- Kerala Legislative Assembly: 0 / 140

Kerala Janapaksham (Secular) was a registered political party in the Indian state of Kerala. It was founded by P. C. George in 2019. It had an MLA from the Poonjar constituency.

== History ==
Kerala Janapaksham (Secular) formed after P.C. George was expelled from Kerala Congress (Secular), along with his followers.

The party formed after it split from Kerala Congress (Joseph) in the early 2000's. P.C George was the leader of the fraction. The party chai was T.S. John. George was MLA From Poonjar. Kerala Congress (Secular) (KCS) was then part of LDF. George was expelled from LDF and forced to join UDF. KCS became part of UDF by merger into Kerala Congress (Mani) in 2010. and George became vice chairman of Kerala Congress (Mani) .

After the Revival of KCS no one in Kerala politics wanted to work with George. He was expelled from KCS, which launched many factions in the party who all tried to merge with other parties. and George then created Kerala Janapaksham (Secular).

=== First Faction ===
TS John announced that his faction was rejoining Kerala Congress (Mani). A section of the party led by Kallada Das, PA Alexander, and A. A. Abraham rejoined.

=== Second Faction ===
A group of leaders led by PA Alexander and A. A. Abraham merged with the Nationalist Congress Party (NCP).

=== Third Faction ===
A faction led by Deacon Thomas Kayyathra merged with Kerala Congress (Skaria Thomas) group

=== Fourth Faction ===
A faction led by Kallada Das decided to join the National Democratic Alliance. Later this faction merged with Kerala Congress (Thomas). In 2018, Kerala Congress (Secular) Kalalda Das faction merged with Kerala Congress.

=== Fifth Faction ===
George's group merged with Kerala Janapaksham (Secular) with the Bharatiya Janata Party (BJP) on 31 January 2024.

== Assembly elections ==
In the 2016 Kerala Legislative Assembly election George contested Poonjar constituency as an independent candidate and won. Later he briefly allied with BJP-led NDA and UDF. In 2021 Kerala Legislative Assembly election George lost.
