= Kerala Congress (Secular) =

Kerala Congress (secular)
- Chairperson: Kallada Das
- Split from: Kerala Congress (J)(2004); Kerala Congress (M) (2015); Kerala Congress (2021)
- Merged into: Kerala Congress (M) (2008), (2017)
- Headquarters: Poonjar' Kottayam (India)
- Student wing: Kerala Students Congress (KSC)
- Youth wing: Kerala youth front (S)
- ECI Status: State Party
- Alliance: National Democratic Alliance (2024–present)
- Seats in Rajya Sabha: 0 / 245
- Seats in Lok Sabha: 0 / 543

Kerala Congress (Secular) is a registered regional political party in the Indian state of Kerala. It was a faction of Kerala Congress led by P. C. George, Eapen Varghese, and T. S. John. The party was split from Kerala Congress (M). It had been revived by T.S. John.

== History ==
Kerala Congress (Secular) fraction formed after the split from Kerala Congress (Joseph) in early 2000's. Main leader of the fraction was P.C George however party chairman was T. S. John. PC George was the MLA From Poonjar. Kerala Congress (Secular) was part of LDF then. However he was expelled from LDF and forced to join UDF. Kerala Congress (Secular) became part of UDF and merged into Kerala Congress (Mani) on 2010. and Pc George became vice chairman of Kerala Congress (Mani) .

=== Expelled By Mani Family And Revival of Kerala Congress (Secular) ===
In 2015 Mani tried to make his son as his successor, George tried to prevent this power exchange within the Mani family. It created a lot of problems between KM Mani and PC George. Other opponents of George also want him out of the party so they joined hands with Mani family. As a result, he was expelled from party. The supporters of PC George revived Kerala Congress (Secular) under the leadership of T. S. John.

The opponents of PC George later leaved Kerala congress (Mani) stating same reasons.

=== Merger 2.0 ===
After the Revival of Kerala Congress (Secular) no one in the kerala politics want to work with P.C George. So George was expelled from the Kerala Congress (Secular) which ultimately created many fractions in the party, and they all tried to merge with other parties. P.C George later created his own party called Kerala Janapaksham (Secular) but fate is similler like Kerala Congress (Secular)

==== First faction ====
First group was led by TS John, he announced its decision to rejoin with Kerala Congress (Mani). However, a section of the party led by Kallada Das, PA Alexander, A. A. Abraham decided to retain the party.

==== Second faction ====
Second group of leaders led by PA Alexander and A. A. Abraham, announced its decision to merge with the Nationalist Congress Party (NCP).

==== Third faction ====
Third faction led by Deacon Thomas Kayyathra merged with Kerala Congress (Skaria Thomas) group.

==== Fourth faction ====
fourth the Fraction led by Kallada Das decided to retain the party and join the National Democratic Alliance. Later this faction merged with Kerala Congress (Thomas). In 2018, Kerala Congress (Secular) Kallada Das faction merged with Kerala Congress.

==== Fifth Faction ====
In 2021, Kallada Das split from Kerala Congress and revived Kerala Congress (Secular). Now, Kallada Das leading the party as Chairman. Kerala Congress (Secular) has been allowed by the Election commission of India to use its native election emblem, the "Electric Bulb". since 2012, Kerala Congress (Secular) has been a companion of the NDA. In March 2024, after a meeting with BJP state President Shri K Surendran, Organisational Secretary Shri K Subhash, State General Secretary Adv. P Sudheer and BJP Leader Shri PK Krishnadas, it was announced that Kerala Congress (Secular) is a related party(അനുബന്ധ കക്ഷി) of the NDA.

== Merger move of Kerala Congress factions within NDA ==
There is a move for grand-merger of Kerala Congress factions within NDA - Kerala Congress(D) of Ranjith Abraham Thomas, Kerala Congress(N) of Kuruvila Mathews, Kerala Congress(S) of Kallada Das, Kerala Vikas Congress (KVC) of Prof. Prakash Kuriakose along with National Progressive Party of V. V. Augustine along with some individual former Kerala Congress leaders like George J. Mathew, V. Surendran Pillai, Mathew Stephen, M. V. Mani, George Sebastian, Jerry Easow Oommen, etc.
