= Sebastian M. J. =

(born 1969) Indian politician and lawyer

Adv. Sebastian M. J.

Member of the Kerala Legislative Assembly
- Incumbent
- Assumed office May 2026
- Preceded by: Sebastian Kulathunkal
- Constituency: Poonjar

Personal details
- Born: Sebastian M. J. 1969 (age 56–57) Kottayam district, Kerala, India
- Party: Indian National Congress
- Parent: Joseph (father)
- Education: BA, LLB, MBA
- Occupation: Advocate, Politician, Businessman

Adv. Sebastian M. J. (born 1969) is an Indian politician and lawyer serving as the member of the legislative assembly (MLA) for the Poonjar constituency in the Kerala Legislative Assembly. A member of the Indian National Congress, he was elected in the 2026 Kerala Legislative Assembly election, defeating the incumbent representative and a veteran regional leader.

== Early life and education ==
Sebastian M. J. was born to Joseph in the Kottayam district of Kerala. He completed his Bachelor of Arts (BA) at St. Thomas College, Palai, in 1989. He subsequently pursued a legal education, obtaining an LLB from Symbiosis Law School in 1993, followed by an MBA from Symbiosis International University, in 1995. Professionally, he has been involved in legal practice, agriculture, and business.

== Political career ==
Sebastian rose through the ranks of the Congress party's local organizational structure in Kottayam. In the 2026 Kerala Assembly elections, he was nominated by the Congress to contest from Poonjar, a constituency noted for its high-profile electoral contests.

In a victory described by media outlets as a major shift in Central Travancore politics, Sebastian polled 56,900 votes. He defeated the incumbent MLA, Sebastian Kulathunkal of the Kerala Congress (M), who secured 50,207 votes, and veteran politician P. C. George of the Bharatiya Janata Party, who finished in third place. His campaign primarily focused on the issues faced by rubber farmers and the agricultural community in the eastern reaches of Kottayam district.

== Election results ==
=== 2026 Kerala Legislative Assembly election ===
Party	Candidate	Votes	%	±%	
	INC	Adv. Sebastian M. J.	56,900	39.43	+16.32
	KC(M)	Sebastian Kulathunkal	50,207	34.79	-14.12
	BJP	P. C. George	36,172	25.07	-
	BSP	Shiny A. C.	603	0.42	-
Margin of victory		6,693	4.64		
Total valid votes		1,44,302			
INC gain from KC(M)		Swing	+15.22		
