= P. C. George =

Indian politician (born 1951)

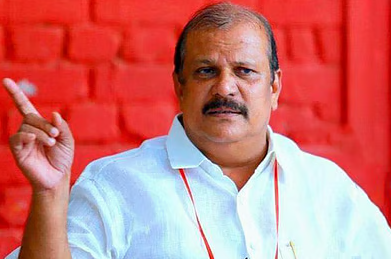

Chief Whip of the Kerala Legislative Assembly
- In office 18 May 2011 – 7 April 2015
- Succeeded by: Thomas Unniyadan

Member of the Kerala Legislative Assembly
- In office 20 May 1996 – 2 May 2021
- Preceded by: Joy Abraham
- Succeeded by: Sebastian Kulathunkal
- Constituency: Poonjar
- In office 1980 – 1987
- Preceded by: V. J. Joseph
- Succeeded by: N. M. Joseph
- Constituency: Poonjar

Personal details
- Born: 28 August 1951 (age 75) Aruvithura, Erattupetta, Kottayam, State of Travancore–Cochin (present day Kerala)
- Party: Bharatiya Janata Party (2024-present)
- Other political affiliations: Kerala Janapaksham (Secular) (2019-2024); NDA Independent (2016-2019); Kerala Congress (M) (2006-2016); Independent (1996-2006); Kerala Congress (Joseph) (1980-1987)
- Spouse: Usha George (m. 1981)
- Children: 2 Shone George & Shane George
- Education: Sacred Heart College, Thevara

Plathottathil Chacko George (born 28 August 1951) is an Indian politician and member of the Bharatiya Janata Party. George is a seven-time former MLA of the Poonjar constituency in the Kottayam district of Kerala state (1982–87) and (1996-2021). He was in the Kerala Legislative Assembly for 33 years. After the legislative election in 2016, he created his own party named as Kerala Janapaksham (Secular). Formerly, he was the member of political parties like KC, KC(J), KC(M) and KC(S). Prior to the 2024 Indian general election, his party Kerala Janapaksham (Secular) merged with the BJP.

George served as the Chief Whip of the Kerala Legislative Assembly from 2011 to 2015, under KC(M) party of the UDF government. George later became an independent politician. In 2017, he formed the party Kerala Janapaksham (Secular). Prior to the 2019 Indian general election, his party joined the NDA. In 2021, he was lost to Adv. Sebastian Kulathunkal in Poonjar Constituency. He was one of the leaders considered as an NDA candidate for the Pathanamthitta constituency in the 2024 Lok Sabha election.

== Personal life ==
George was born on August 28, 1951, in Aruvithura in present-day Kottayam district of Kerala to Chackochan and Mariamma. He married Usha George on 25 January 1981 and has two sons, Shone and Shane. One of his sons, Shone, is married to Parvathy, daughter of veteran actor Jagathy Sreekumar. His son, Adv. Shone George is a member of Kottayam district panchayat from the Poonjar division.

== Political career ==
His political career started through students' movement. He was Ernakulam District President of K.S.C. (1971–73); General Secretary of K.S.C. (1973–76). He was elected as MLA from poonjar in 1980 Kerala congress LDF candidate He was arrested several times in connection with students agitations.There are a lot friends for P. C. George in Poonjar during that time itself. They have taken care his initial elections.He was Chairman of the Petitions Committee of the Legislative Assembly for seven and a half years. He was Chairman of the Subordinate Legislation Committee for two and a half years; Chairman of the Committee on Papers Laid on the Table for two and a half years. He was General Secretary, Kerala Congress; and Party leader of Kerala Congress (Secular) (2003–2010). He served as K.S.R.T.C. Board Member for ten years. He was elected to the Niyamasabha in 1981, 1982, 1996, 2001 and 2006, all from Poonjar constituency.

He was the incumbent MLA from Poonjar constituency in Kottayam District of Kerala until 2021. George was also vice-chairman of Kerala Congress (M), a splinter faction of Kerala Congress. The splinter groups of Kerala Congress are known for frequent splits and mergers. P. C. George was formerly a leader of the Kerala Congress (J) party and was critical of K. M.. Mani, the leader of Kerala Congress (M). Later George quit the Joseph group and formed his own group and named it "Kerala Congress (secular)". Recently, P. C. George merged his group with K. M. Mani's faction. Before joining Kerala Congress (M) his party was affiliated with the LDF.

P.C. George served as the Chief Whip, Government of Kerala in the UDF Government from 2011, until he was removed from the post on 7 April 2015. This removal was triggered based on the fights within the Kerala Congress (M), spurred due to the bar scam allegations on K M Mani.

After these dramatic incidents, P. C. George made a huge comeback in the 2016 panchayat elections and was looking forward to the upcoming Assembly election.

Just before the election, P. C. George was removed from "Kerala Congress (M)" party. And hence he decides to face the election without the support of any parties and to compete in the election as independent candidate. It was a fight unlike anything seen in this elections in the district: One man against the three major political formations. In the end, P.C. George came out victorious in style with a thumping margin of 27,821 votes with support of an Islamic out fit Popular front. Mr. George was ousted from both the LDF and the UDF and even dubbed as the man leaders loved to hate. He was a marked man by CPI(M) leader Pinarayi Vijayan and hated by K. M.. Mani, P.J. Joseph, and even Oommen Chandy. Though he expected the Left to take him back, it was not to be so. In fact, during the protracted campaign period, Mr. Vijayan had personally visited Poonjar twice to ensure that Mr. George was defeated. However, it appears that his major success was in operating a major split in the local unit of the CPI(M) and the UDF. In 2011, the LDF Independent Mohan Thomas received 44,105 votes. This time, LDF candidate P.C. Joseph could only muster just half the votes at 22,270 votes. Mr. George, in fact, raised his vote share from 59,809 in 2011 to 63,621. The UDF share came down to 35,800.

On 10 April 2019, Kerala Janapaksham, led by P. C. George joined the NDA.

On 31 January 2024, Kerala Janapaksham (Secular), led by P. C. George Merged with the Bharatiya Janata Party (BJP).

Electoral victories of P. C. George
Year	Closest rival	Political Party	Votes polled
1980	V. J. Joseph	KEC	25,806
1982	N. M. Joseph	JNP	33,844
1996	Joy Abraham	KEC-M	48,834
2001	Adv. T. V. Abraham	KEC-M	48,499
2006	Adv. Abraham Kaipanplackal	KEC-M	48,795
2011	Adv. Mohan Thomas	Independent	59,809
2016	Georgekutty Augusty	Kerala Congress (M)	63,621

== Controversies ==
George has been strongly criticized for his derogatory comments against women. He was summoned by the women's commission for his derogatory reference about a Catholic nun, who was a victim of rape.

George got into a controversy when he demanded that India should be declared as a Hindu nation.

George is also highly controversial as he was arrested and is dealing with two cases of hate speech towards the Muslim community as of May 2022.

On 2 July 2022, George was arrested for sexual assault complaint filed by an accused in the solar panel case. A new case has now been registered against him for insulting a woman journalist in July 2022

As of 2024-25, many of the hate speech cases filed against him are still on going.

== Filmography ==
- 2007: Hareendran Oru Nishkalankan as himself
- 2010: 9 KK Road as Leader of Opposition, Keralam
- 2017: Achayans as himself
- 2018: Daivame Kaithozham K. Kumar Akanam as Chief Minister of Kerala
- 2018: Theekuchiyum Panithulliyum as Police officer
- 2026: KKK Moonnu Raja as Home Minister of Keralam
