= Thomas Kallampally =

Indian politician and educationist

Member of Kerala Legislative Assembly for Kanjirappally
- In office 25 January 1980 – 25 March 1987
- Preceded by: KV Kurien
- Succeeded by: KJ Thomas

Personal details
- Born: Joseph Thomas Kallampally; 19 April 1953 Kanjirappally, Travancore-Cochin, India
- Died: 27 February 2002 (aged 48) Kanjirappally, Kerala, India
- Party: Kerala Congress
- Spouse: Thresikutty Thomas
- Children: Subhash Chandra Jose; Mohan Roy Mathews; Vivek Anand T Kallampally; Ashok T Kallampally
- Education: St. Thomas College, Pala; Government Law College, Ernakulam; Mahatma Gandhi University
- Website: Kanjirappaly

Thomas Kallampally (19 April 1953 – 27 February 2002) was a notable politician and educationist from Kanjirappally, Kerala. He was born in Kanjirappally. He started Netaji Vayanasaala, a library for the youth, at Anakkal, Kanjirappally at the age of 18. He was elected as the State General Secretary of Kerala Students Congress, the students' wing of Kerala Congress, while doing his Law Degree at Government Law College, Ernakulam. He also served as the PTA president of St Antony's Public school from its inception till his demise. Kallampally was also a member of Center for Human Resourced Development of State of Kerala and Kerala State Pollution Control Board. He was also a lead campaign manager for the Kerala Congress for various Lok Sabha elections. Kallampally holds the record of the second youngest MLA in the history of Kerala Legislative Assembly having elected to the Assembly at the age of 26.

== Early life and education ==
Kallampally was born on 19 April 1953 in a family of agriculturists belonging to the Nasrani community, in Kanjirappally in Kottayam district of Kerala, India. as the second son of Mr K. M Joseph and Annamma. Thomas Kallampally's parents send him to the AKJM school since he was good at studies from an early age. At the age of 18, he organized the local youth at his hometown to start a library in his ancestral property, which he named after Netaji Subhash Chandra Bose. After predegree at St. Dominics College, he joined St. Thomas College, Pala for his bachelor's degree in botany. He was attracted to the students' politics of Kerala Students Congress and soon rose as a dynamic student leader. He then joined Government Law College, Ernakulam for LLB. He had a brilliant academic career.

== Early political career ==
Kallampally became a member of the Kerala Congress during his student days. He was elected as the district president of Kerala Students Congress, the student wing of the Kerala Congress. Due to his dynamic leadership and flamboyant oratory skills, he was soon elected as the state general secretary of Kerala Students Congress under Mr P. M. Mathew as the state president. Kallampally led a foot protest march of KSC from Kasargod to Parasala against the anti-student policies of the government. He was the only leader to walk the entire 600+ kilometers with his president. He was asked to contest the panchayat elections in Parathodu and he won the election to be the member of Parathodu panchayat. He worked briefly as a lawyer in High Court of Kerala.

== MLA of Kanjirappally ==
In 1980 Kallampally contested for the Legislative Assembly from Kanjirappally as the Kerala Congress candidate. He defeated Joseph Varanam. Under the leadership of Kallampally, there were many development initiatives like roads, bridges, drinking water schemes and schools that was brought in Kanjirappally. He was subsequently re-elected in 1982 when he defeated Mr Mustafa Kamal by a margin of 8437 votes. He made a mark both inside and outside the Kerala Legislative Assembly with his oratory. He could use both a forensic style and a more flamboyant grand style with ease depending on the situation. A development roadmap was put forth for constituency which he chased professionally to bring the development initiatives. He remained in office until 1987 elections and was known for exceptional development works that he brought in the constituency.

=== 1987 Election ===
1987 saw a lot of political polarization in Kerala. Kerala Congress was split just before the elections under P. J. Joseph and K. M. Mani. Kallampally's effort to avoid the split turned futile. Meanwhile, George J Mathew, another leader from Kerala Congress and earlier Member of Parliament from the Lok Sabha constituency was at odds with Kerala Congress, decided to contest the legislative elections from Kanjirappally against Kallampally. Both these developments caused the split in the United Democratic Front votes. In the triangular contest, Kallampally was defeated and Mr KJ Thomas of the Communist Party of India (Marxist) won.

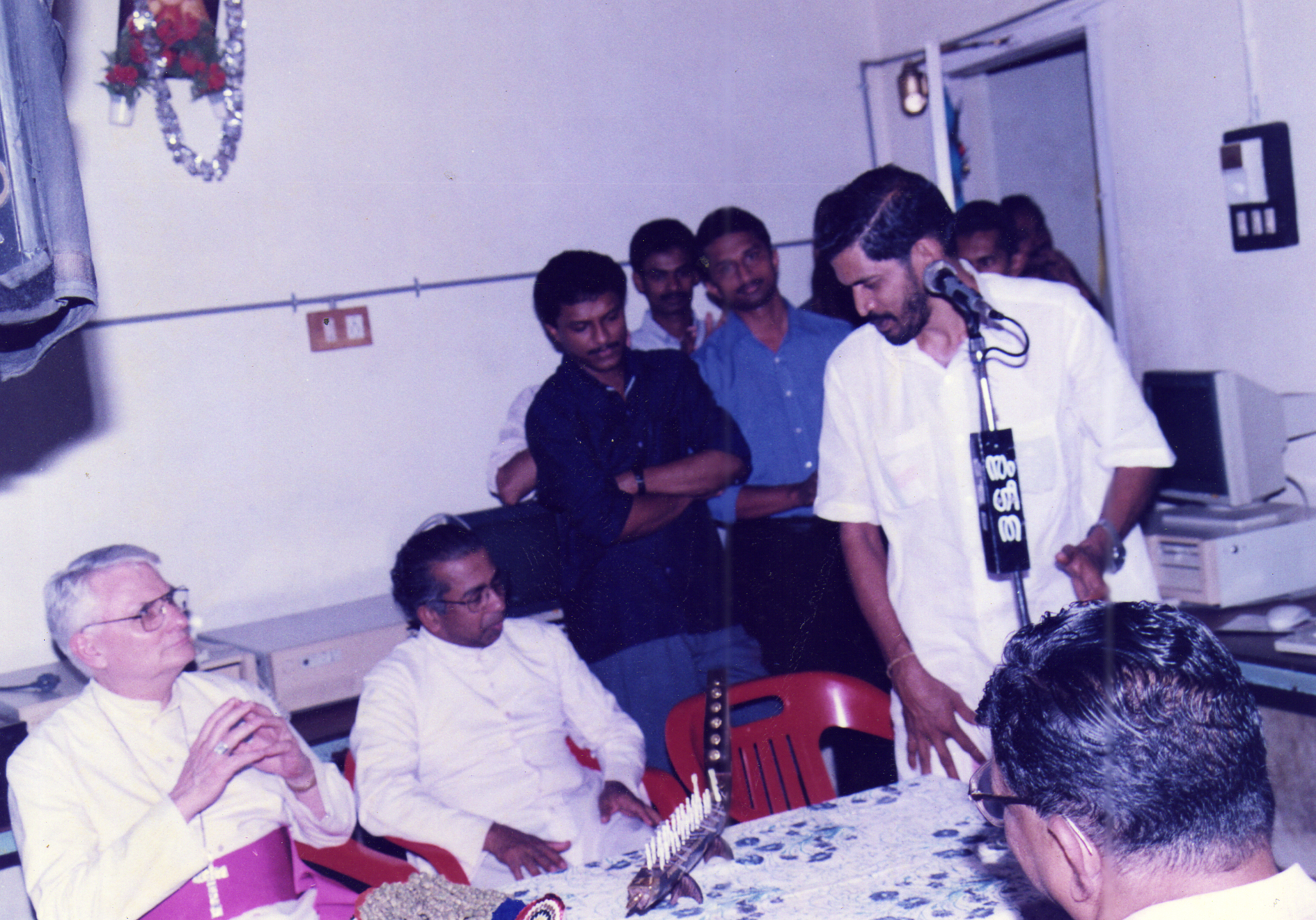
Kallampally at St Antony's College Function

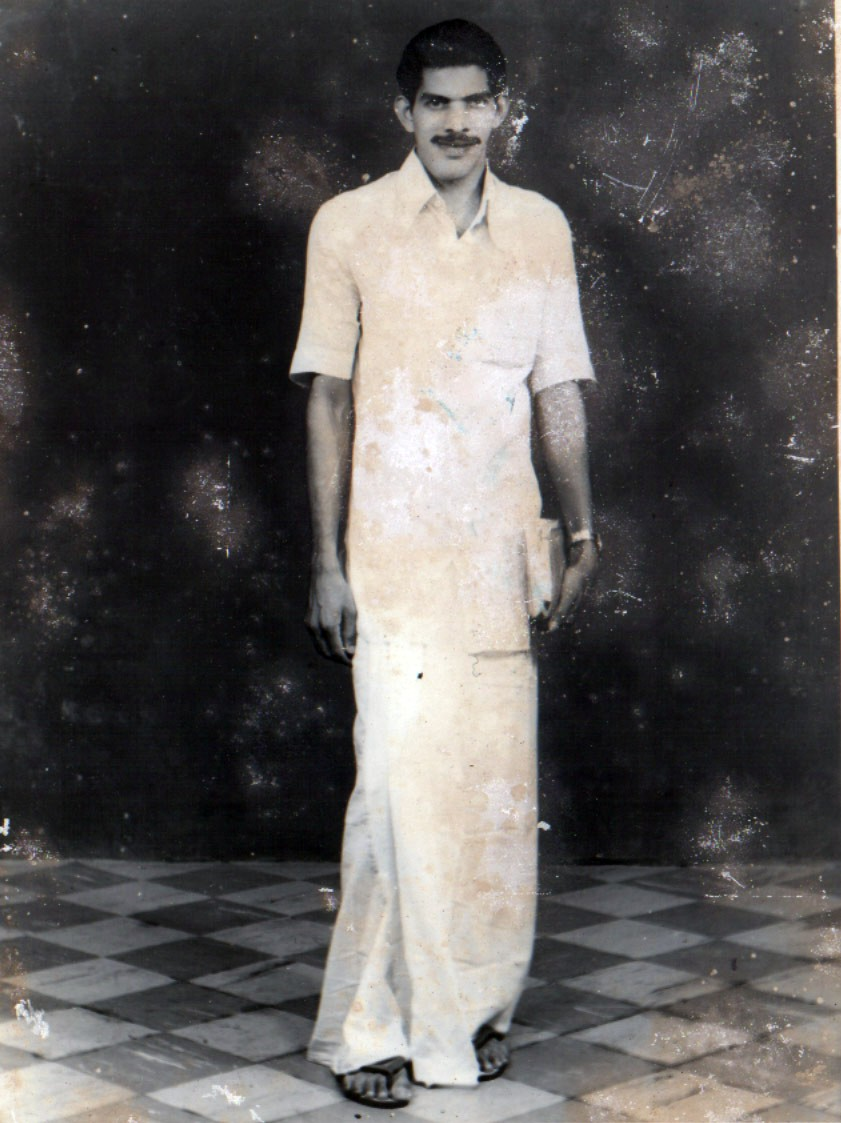
Young Kallampally as MLA

== Education Initiatives ==
Kallampally worked as a lawyer after the 1987 election. He spent a lot of his time on education initiatives around Kanjirappally apart from legal career and politics. He worked with the parish priests of Anakkal church to start the St Antony's Public School and Junior College in 1988. Initially the school was set up as an English medium school affiliated to the state syllabus. But the state government under E. K. Nayanar. ordered to cancel the newly setup English medium schools as per the policy of the LDF government. Kallampally decided to pursue a CBSE affiliation to the school on the advice of the then education minister K. Chandrasekharan. It was a time when CBSE schools were unknown in the central Travancore area and CBSE schools at Yercaud and Ootty was the privilege of the elite rich planters. Kallampally realized that a CBSE school was the best way to attain his objective to give the poor people of Kanjirappaly an affordable opportunity to have quality education on par with international standards. In 1988, after his continuous effort, visits to Delhi, meetings with the then Chairman of Central Board of Secondary Education (CBSE), H. S Sinha and an inspection from a high power committee, CBSE affiliation was granted to the school. St Antony's Public School and Junior College has since then grown to be one of the best schools in the State of Kerala. Kallampally was part of the Managing Council and played an intense role from selection of staff, laying down policies, aiding the principal in day-to-day administration challenges to spearheading the larger development initiatives of the school.
In 1991, he founded St Antony's College along with few other volunteers in Kanjirappaly with an aim to provide better higher education to the people around Kanjirappally. It was a time when computers were unknown in the area. St Antony's College was the first institution in the central Travancore area to provide DOEACC recognized A Level courses in computer science. He served as the Principal of St Antony's College until his death.

== Personal life and family ==
He married Thresikutty Mathew, a teacher by profession, on 26 September 1982 while he was an MLA. She retired as the principal of St. Dominic's Higher Secondary School in Kanjirapally. They have four sons - Subhash Chandra Jose, an engineer, working as Managing Director - Information Technology, European Bank for Reconstruction and Development (EBRD), UK; Mohan Roy Mathews, a lawyer, working with Maatrum Technologies and Legal Ventures as their state legal head, Kerala; Vivek Anand T Kallampally, an engineer, working with Microsoft, Bengaluru and Ashok T Kallampally, an architect who is running his own firm Habiqube Architecture Studio.

== Personality and image ==
Kallampally had a frugal lifestyle and was a workaholic. In spite of his academic and political success, he lived an exceptionally simple life. He stayed away from controversies his whole lifetime. He had exemplary oratory skills and was known as the 'Roaring Lion of Kerala' due to his style of speech. He could speak for hours on any subject concerning the state of Kerala or even international matters of relevance. He was referred by the media as the most ego less politician in Kerala politics. Kallampally was easily accessible to the people, travelled in KSRTC buses, mingled freely with the poor and favored anyone in need above political affiliations, which earned him a unique position among the people of Kanjirappally.
