= Janata Parivar =

Loose grouping of Indian political parties

Janata Parivar (translated as Janata Family) is an umbrella term which refers to various political parties that emerged from Janata Dal. Janata Dal was formed through the merger of Janata Party factions, the Lok Dal, Indian National Congress (Jagjivan) and the Jan Morcha under the leadership of V. P. Singh on 11 October 1988 on the birth anniversary of Jayaprakash Narayan.

By 1996 Indian general election Janata Dal gradually disintegrated into various smaller factions, largely regional parties Biju Janata Dal, Rashtriya Janata Dal, Janata Dal (Secular) and Janata Dal (United).

Some of the breakaway organisations have thrived as independent parties, some have become defunct, while others have merged with the parent party or other political parties.

A formal union of some of these parties, the Janata Parivar Alliance, was formed in 2015 but became inactive after the withdrawal of various parties.On 14 April 2015, the RJD, Janata Dal (United), Janata Dal (Secular), the Indian National Lok Dal, Samajwadi Party, and Samajwadi Janata Party (Rashtriya) announced that they would merge into a new national Janata Parivar alliance in order to oppose the BJP, thus breaking their long time alliance with the INC. This would give the alliance 14 Lok Sabha seats and 30 Rajya Sabha seats.

== Representation of active parties ==
Party	Abbreviation	Foundation	Party Supremo	Fouder(s) ^{[D]}	Current No. of MPs in Lok Sabha (As of November 22, 2025)	Current No. of MPs in Rajya Sabha (As of November 22, 2025)	Base State	Alliance
Samajwadi Party	SP	1992	Akhilesh Yadav	Mulayam Singh Yadav	37	4	Uttar Pradesh, Madhya Pradesh, Maharastra	I.N.D.I.A
Samata Party	SAP	1994	Uday Mandal	George Fernandes	0	0	Bihar	NDA
Indian National Lok Dal	INLD	1996	Om Prakash Chautala	Chaudhary Devi Lal	0	0	Haryana	None
Rashtriya Janata Dal	RJD	1997	Lalu Prasad Yadav	Lalu Prasad Yadav	4	5	Bihar, Jharkhand	I.N.D.I.A
Rashtriya Lok Dal	RLD	1998	Jayant Chaudhary	Chaudhary Ajit Singh	2	1	Uttar Pradesh, Rajasthan	NDA
Biju Janata Dal	BJD	1997	Naveen Patnaik	Naveen Patnaik	0	7	Odisha	None
Janata Dal (United)	JD(U)	1999	Nitish Kumar	Nitish Kumar, Sharad Yadav, George Fernandes	12	4	Bihar, Arunachal Pradesh	NDA
Janata Dal (Secular)	JD(S)	1999	H. D. Deve Gowda	H. D. Deve Gowda	2	1	Karnataka, Kerala	NDA
Socialist Janata Dal	SJD	2014	V. V. Rajendran	V. V. Rajendran	0	0	Kerala	None
Hindustani Awam Morcha (Secular)	HAM(S)	2015	Jitan Ram Manjhi	Jitan Ram Manjhi	1	1	Bihar	NDA
Jannayak Janta Party	JJP	2018	Dushyant Chautala	Ajay Singh Chautala, Dushyant Chautala	0	0	Haryana	None
Rashtriya Lok Janshakti Party	RLJP	2021	Pashupati Kumar Paras	Pashupati Kumar Paras	0	0	Bihar, Manipur	None
Lok Janshakti Party (Ram Vilas)	LJP(RV)	2021	Chirag Paswan	Chirag Paswan	5	0	Bihar, Nagaland	NDA
Rashtriya Lok Morcha	RLM	2023	Upendra Kushwaha	Upendra Kushwaha	0	1	Bihar	NDA
Janshakti Janata Dal	JJD	2025	Tej Pratap Yadav	Tej Pratap Yadav	0	0	Bihar	NDA
Indian Socialist Janata Dal	ISJD	2026	Mathew T. Thomas	Mathew T. Thomas	0	0	Kerala	LDF (Kerala)
National Janata Dal	NJD	2018	Adv. John John	Adv. John John	00	00	Kerala	UDF

== List of breakaway parties ==
Year	Party	Founder	Region	Status
1990	Samajwadi Janata Party (Rashtriya)	Chandra Shekhar	Uttar Pradesh	Abolished
1990	Janata Dal (Gujarat)	Chimanbhai Patel; Chhabildas Mehta	Gujarat	Abolished
1990	Janata Dal (Ajit)	Ajit Singh	Uttar Pradesh	Merged with the Indian National Congress in the early 1990s
1992	Samajwadi Party	Mulayam Singh Yadav	Uttar Pradesh	Active
1994	Samta Party	George Fernandes; Nitish Kumar	Bihar	Active now led by Uday Mandal.
1997	Indian National Lok Dal	Chaudhary Devi Lal	Haryana	Active
1997	Biju Janata Dal	Naveen Patnaik	Odisha	Active
1997	Rashtriya Janata Dal	Lalu Prasad Yadav; Raghuvansh Prasad Singh; Kanti Singh	Bihar	Active
1998	Lok Shakti	Ramakrishna Hegde	Karnataka	Merged with Janata Dal (United)
1998	Rashtriya Lok Dal	Ajit Singh	Uttar Pradesh	Active
1999	Janata Dal (Secular)	H. D. Deve Gowda	Karnataka	Active
2000	Lok Janshakti Party	Ram Vilas Paswan	Bihar	Split into two Factions
2002	All India Progressive Janata Dal	Ramakrishna Hegde	Karnataka	Dissolved in 2006
2003	Janata Dal (United)	George Fernandes; Nitish Kumar; Sharad Yadav; Ramakrishna Hegde	Bihar; Jharkhand; Arunachal Pradesh; Nagaland	Active
2009	National Jan Morcha	Ajeya Pratap Singh	Uttar Pradesh	Merged with the Indian National Congress
2010	Socialist Janata (Democratic)	M. P. Veerendra Kumar	Kerala	Merged with Janata Dal (United) on 29 December 2014
2013	Rashtriya Lok Samta Party	Upendra Kushwaha	Bihar	Merged with Janata Dal (United) on 14 March 2021
2014	Socialist Janata Dal	V. V. Rajendran	Kerala	Active
2015	Hindustani Awam Morcha (Secular)	Jitan Ram Manjhi	Bihar	Active
2015	Jan Adhikar Party Loktantrik	Pappu Yadav	Bihar	Merged with Indian National Congress
2018	Samajwadi Secular Morcha	Shivpal Singh Yadav	Uttar Pradesh	Renamed as Pragatisheel Samajwadi Party (Lohiya) Merged with Samajwadi Party
2018	Jannayak Janta Party	Ajay Singh Chautala; Dushyant Chautala	Haryana	Active
2018	Loktantrik Janata Dal	Sharad Yadav	Bihar; Kerala	Merged with Rashtriya Janata Dal
2021	Lok Janshakti Party (Ram Vilas)	Chirag Paswan	Bihar	Active
2021	Rashtriya Lok Janshakti Party	Pashupati Kumar Paras	Bihar	Active
2023	Rashtriya Lok Morcha	Upendra Kushwaha	Bihar	Active party started as Rashtriya Lok Janata Dal in 2023
2025	Janshakti Janata Dal	Tej Pratap Yadav	Bihar	Active
2026	Indian Socialist Janata Dal	Mathew T. Thomas	Kerala	Active
2018	National Janata Dal	Adv. John John	Kerala	Active

== See also ==
- Dravidian parties, a movement starting with Justice Party (India)
- List of chief ministers from the Janata Dal
- List of Indian National Congress breakaway parties
  - Splits and Mergers of Kerala Congress
- List of chief ministers from the Janata Party
