= Sebastian Kulathunkal =

Indian politician

Member of the Kerala Legislative Assembly for Poonjar
- In office May 2021 – May 2026
- Preceded by: P. C. George
- Succeeded by: Sebastian M. J.

Personal details
- Born: 10 October 1966 (age 60) Kerala
- Party: Kerala Congress (M)

Sebastian Kulathunkal is an Indian politician who served as the MLA of Poonjar Constituency from May 2021 to May 2026. His party is Kerala Congress (M). In the 2021 election, he won against the preceding MLA P.C. George by a total of 16000 votes.
