= Aikya Kerala Congress =

Aikya Kerala Congress was an alliance consisting of four political parties in Kerala, India; Kerala Congress (Mani), Kerala Congress (Balakrishna Pillai), Kerala Congress (Jacob) and Kerala Congress (Secular). The alliance was formed in November 2008. K.M. Mani was the chairman of AKC, whilst R. Balakrishna Pillai was the convenor of the alliance.

The alliance was unsuccessful and disbanded.
