= George Thomas (Indian politician) =

Indian politician, journalist, and academic

- Constituency: Kallooppara

Personal details
- Born: March 1926 Kottayam, Kerala, India
- Died: 17 September 1993 (aged 66–67)
- Party: Indian National Congress
- Spouse: Rachel Thomas

Dr. K. George Thomas was a journalist, academic, Indian National Congress politician and former Member of the Legislative Assembly of Kallooppara to Kerala Legislative Assembly in 1967. He was also a founding member of Kerala Congress.

Thomas was born in March 1926 at Kottayam as son of K G Thomas, a versatile preacher and evangelist in the Christian Brethren Church. He belonged to the Kallarakkal subfamily of Pakalomattom Ayrookuzhiyil family.

He took his Doctorate in Political Science from the University of Washington and later was a teaching fellow at University of Washington.

He was one of the founding members of Kerala Congress. and moved Indian National Congress during the splits in Kerala Congress to many factions.

He became publisher and managing editor of Kerala Dhwani, Kerala Bhushanam, and the Malayalam weekly Manorajyam. Manorajyam, started by EJ Kanam, was bought by Thomas. Rachel Thomas, his wife, was the editor for some time. After her death it was bought by Goodnight Mohan. Now the weekly have stopped publishing.

He was elected as a MLA to Third Kerala Legislative Assembly in 1967, defeating N.T.George of CPM. George Thomas received 17,267 votes while N.T.George received 13,668 votes of the total valid 44,242 votes of the total electorate of 58,804 people. He was also Deputy Leader, Congress Legislature Party in the Kerala Assembly.

Thomas and Rachel have one son and one daughter.

He died on 17 September 1993.
