= K. R. Saraswathy Amma =

Indian politician

Member of Kerala Legislative Assembly
- Chief Minister: Pattom A. Thanu Pillai
- Constituency: Chengannur
- In office 1960–1965
- Preceded by: R. Sankaran Thampi
- Succeeded by: P. G. P. Pillai

Personal details
- Born: February 1923
- Died: 20 July 1999 (aged 76)
- Party: Kerala Congress

K. R. Saraswathy Amma (February 1923 - July 1999) was an Indian politician who served as the Member of the Legislative Assembly (M.L.A.) of the Kerala Legislative Assembly from Idukki from 1960 to 1965.
