= Kerala Congress Democratic =

- Abbreviation: KECD
- Chairperson: Saji Manjakadambil
- Founded: 19 April 2024; 2 years ago
- Dissolved: 2025; 1 year ago
- Split from: Kerala Congress
- Merged into: All India Trinamool Congress
- Colours: White; Red
- ECI status: Unrecognized party
- Alliance: NDA (Kerala); (2024–2025)

Kerala Congress Democratic (KECD) was an Indian political party in the state of Kerala. It was formed on 19 April 2024, through a split from the Kerala Congress.

== History ==
Kerala Congress Kottayam district president and chairman of the United Democratic Front (Kerala) Saji Manjakadambil, left his original party, founding another and joining the NDA.

== Leaders ==
- Saji Manjakadambil
- Dinesh Kartha
- Balu G Vellikkara
- Prasad Urulikunnam
- Tijo Koottummelkattil
- Ranjith Abraham Thomas
- Adv. Rajesh Puliyaneth

== Split and merger with Trinamool Congress ==
In 2025 February, Kerala Congress (Democratic) split into three:

- Kerala Congress (D) Saji Manjakadambil of Saji Manjakadambil
- Kerala Congress (D) Ranjith Abraham Thomas of Ranjith Abraham Thomas
- Kerala Congress (D) Rajesh Puliyaneth of Adv. Rajesh Puliyaneth

The faction led by Saji Manjakadambil decided to merge his faction with All India Trinamool Congress. The other factions led by Ranjith Abraham Thomas and Adv. Rajesh Puliyaneth decided to continue with NDA.

== Merger move of Kerala Congress factions within NDA ==
There is a move for grand-merger of Kerala Congress factions within NDA - Kerala Congress(D) of Ranjith Abraham Thomas, Kerala Congress(N) of Kuruvila Mathews, Kerala Congress(S) of Kallada Das, Kerala Vikas Congress (KVC) of Prof. Prakash Kuriakose along with National Progressive Party of V. V. Augustine along with some individual former Kerala Congress leaders like George J. Mathew, V. Surendran Pillai, Mathew Stephen, M. V. Mani, George Sebastian, Jerry Easow Oommen, etc.
