= Kerala Congress (Anti-merger Group) =

- Leader: Skariah Thomas
- Founder: Skariah Thomas
- Founded: 2010
- Dissolved: 2015
- Split from: Kerala Congress
- Succeeded by: Kerala Congress (Skaria Thomas); Kerala Congress (Thomas)
- Alliance: LDF
- Seats in Rajya Sabha: 0
- Seats in Lok Sabha: 0

Election symbol

Kerala Congress (Anti-merger Group) was a faction of Kerala Congress led by Skariah Thomas in Kerala. Kerala Congress (Anti-merger Group) was formerly a part of Left Democratic Front (LDF).

== History ==
In April 2010 the Kerala Congress (M) and Kerala Congress (J) led by P. J. Joseph decided to merge. But P. C. Thomas opposed the merger. Both P. J. Joseph and P. C. Thomas claimed the party symbol of a bicycle and the party name of Kerala Congress. Registration of Kerala Congress has been frozen by the Election Commission. The case is under review. The P. C. Thomas faction is known as the Kerala Congress (Anti-merger Group) with a chair for its symbol.

== 2011 State assembly elections ==
It participated in 2011 elections as a part of LDF. The Party was assigned three seats to contest but was unable to win.

The party enjoys a strong presence in southern Kerala and is active in that region.

Sl. No:	District	Constituency	Name
1	Kottayam	Kaduthuruthy	Stephen George
2	Thiruvananthapuram	Thiruvananthapuram	V. Surendran Pillai
3	Ernakulam	Kothamangalam	Skaria Thomas

== Split in Kerala Congress (Anti-merger Group) ==
In 2015, Kerala Congress (Anti-merger Group) is split into 2 parties

1. Kerala Congress (Skaria Thomas)
2. Kerala Congress (Thomas)

=== Leaders in Skaria Thomas faction ===
- Skariah Thomas
- V. Surendran Pillai
- Thomas Kunnapally
- Jerry Easow Oommen

=== Leaders in P. C. Thomas faction ===
- P. C. Thomas
- Rajan Kannattu
