= Kerala Vikas Congress =

- Leader: Jose Chemperi
- Chairperson: Prakash Kuriakose
- Founded: 25 October 2014
- Headquarters: Chemperi, Kannur(India)

Election symbol
- Car

Kerala Vikas Congress (KVC) is a political party led by Jose Chemperi that was found on 25 October 2014 in the Indian state of Kerala.

== Alliance and break-up ==
Kerala Vikas Congress (KVC) had an alliance with BJP in kerala and it also supported the NDA in the centre since 2014 until 2016 when Jose Chemperi] decided to break the alliance and go alone in the 2016 Kerala Legislative Assembly elections.

== Splinter groups ==
Sl.No:	Name of the Party Group	Party Party Leader	Alliances
1	Kerala Vikas Congress (Jose Chemperi)	Jose Chemperi	Left Democratic Front. Merged with Kerala Congress (B)
2	Kerala Vikas Congress (Prakash Kuriakose)	Prakash Kuriakose	National Democratic Alliance

== Merger move of Kerala Congress factions within NDA ==
There is a move for grand-merger of Kerala Congress factions within NDA - Kerala Congress(D) of Ranjith Abraham Thomas, Kerala Congress(N) of Kuruvila Mathews, Kerala Congress(S) of Kallada Das, Kerala Vikas Congress (KVC) of Prof. Prakash Kuriakose along with National Progressive Party of V. V. Augustine along with some individual former Kerala Congress leaders like George J. Mathew, V. Surendran Pillai, Mathew Stephen, M. V. Mani, George Sebastian, Jerry Easow Oommen, etc.
