= V. Surendran Pillai =

Indian politician

Minister for Port & Youth welfare
- In office 10 September 2010 – 16 May 2011
- Preceded by: M. Vijayakumar
- Succeeded by: K. Babu
- Constituency: Thiruvananthapuram West

Member of the Legislative Assembly
- In office 22 May 1984 – 1987
- Preceded by: M. Sam Oommen
- Succeeded by: J. Chitharanjan
- Constituency: Punalur

Personal details
- Born: Anchal
- Party: Rashtriya Janata Dal

V. Surendran Pillai was the former minister for Ports and Youth Affairs in the government of Kerala, India. He is a vice president of Loktantrik Janata Dal Kerala State Committee.

== Politics ==
He entered politics as a member of Kerala Congress. He was the president of Anchal Block Panchayath. He held the post of Kerala Congress district president and general secretary. In 1984, he was elected to Kerala Legislative Assembly from Punalur constituency in a by-election.

When party split, he stood with P.J. Joseph, and became the Kerala Congress Trade Union Congress (J) state president. In 2006, he was elected from Thiruvananthapuram West assembly constituency. He defeated Sharath Chandra Prasad from Congress. He was the 183rd minister in the Kerala Legislative Assembly and the sixteenth minister to be sworn in from the Kerala Congress. When Kerala Congress (J) merged with Kerala Congress (M), he joined Kerala Congress (Anti-merger Group). He lost to V.S. Sivakumar in the 2011 State Election.

Once again the party split when he and Skaria Thomas formed Kerala Congress (Skaria Thomas) group. The party had alliance with LDF. But he was enraged after the LDF dumped him while rejecting his claim for the Thiruvananthapuram Central Assembly seat in 2016 election and allotting it to the Kerala Congress (Democratic) nominee. Surendran Pillai announced his decision to leave the Kerala Congress (Skaria Thomas) party and work together with secular and democratic forces. He also claimed that four general secretaries and six district secretaries of the party had quit along with him. He joined Janata Dal (United) and the party gave the Nemom seat to contest.
