= E. John Jacob =

Indian politician

Elanjickal John Jacob

MLA of Kerala Assembly for Thiruvalla
- Constituency: Thiruvalla

Personal details
- Born: 23 August 1913
- Died: 26 September 1978 (aged 65)
- Party: Kerala Congress
- Spouse: Smt.Saramma Jacob

Elanjikal John Jacob was a member of 3rd, 4th and 5th Kerala Legislative Assembly. He was from Kerala Congress party and represented Thiruvalla constituency.

== Positions held ==
He was Minister for Food and Civil supplies from 11 April 1977 to 25 April 1977 and from 27 April 1977 to 26 September 1978. He served Merchant navy as Officer from 1927 to 1940 and commissioned officer in Indian Army from 1942 to 1944. He expired on 26 September 1978, while serving as Minister.
