= Joy Abraham =

Indian politician

MP of Rajya Sabha for Kerala
- In office 2 July 2012 – 1 July 2018
- Succeeded by: Jose K. Mani, KC(M)

Personal details
- Born: 7 March 1951 (age 74)
- Political party: Kerala Congress
- Spouse: Shrimati Valsamma Joy 18 August 1975

Joy Abraham (born 7 March 1951, Bharananganam, District Kottayam (Kerala)) is an Indian Politician and a Member of Parliament in the Rajya Sabha, Upper House of Indian Parliament. He represents Kerala State and is a member of the Kerala Congress (M) party.

He is Advocate by profession. He studied B.A at Saint Thomas College, Pala and completed his LL.B. at Law Academy of Law College at Thiruvananthapuram.

Shri Joy Abraham is a graduate of St. Thomas College, Palai where he got his B.A., LL.B. degrees.
