= Francis George (politician) =

Indian politician

K. Francis George
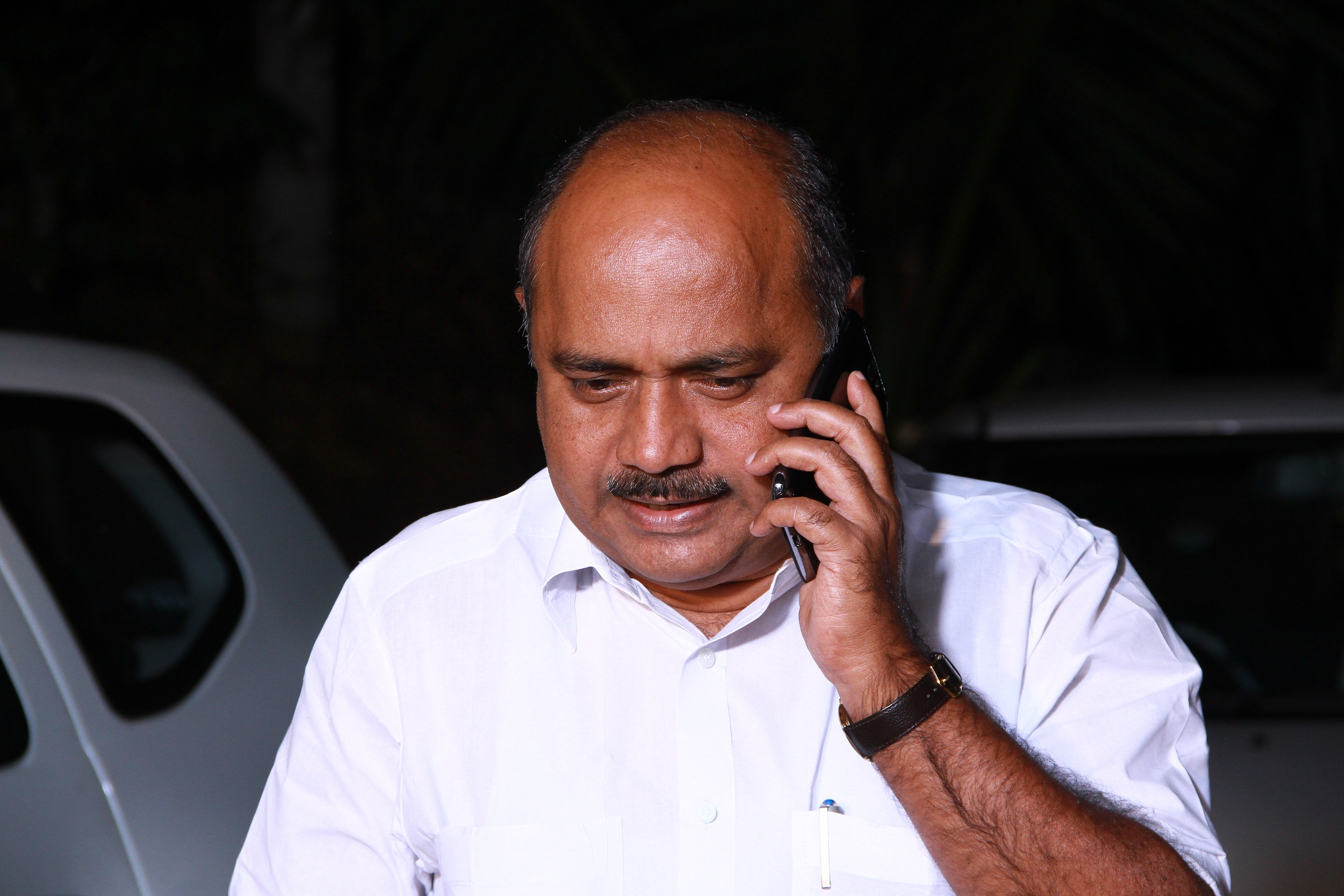
- Francis George at Arakuzha

Member of Parliament, Lok Sabha
- Incumbent
- Assumed office 4 June 2024
- Preceded by: Thomas Chazhikadan
- Constituency: Kottayam
- In office 6 October 1999 – 16 May 2009
- Preceded by: P. C. Chacko
- Succeeded by: P. T. Thomas
- Constituency: Idukki

Personal details
- Born: 29 May 1955 (age 71) Muvattupuzha, Kottayam, State of Travancore–Cochin (present day Kerala), India
- Party: Kerala Congress
- Other party: Janadhipathya Kerala Congress (formerly); Kerala Congress (M) (formerly)
- Spouse: Shiny Francis George
- Children: 3
- Website: http://www.francisgeorge.in

Kalambattuparambil Francis George is an Indian politician who is a member of the Kerala Congress. He is presently a member of 18th Lok Sabha representing Kottayam Lok Sabha constituency. He was a member of the 13th and 14th Lok Sabha, representing Idukki constituency of Kerala. He was formerly a leader of the Kerala Congress (M) and that of his former party Janadhipathya Kerala Congress.

== Political career ==
Prior to the 2016 assembly election, he left Kerala Congress (M) and created a new party — Janadhipathya Kerala Congress. The party joined the Left Democratic Front (LDF) and he contested in the 2016 Kerala assembly election from Idukki. He lost the election to the sitting MLA Roshy Augustine. In 2020, he left the Janadhipathya Kerala Congress and rejoined Kerala Congress and is currently part of the P. J. Joseph faction of the party. In the 2021 elections, he contested as UDF candidate from Idukki. He lost yet again to Roshy Augustine from Kerala Congress (M) in a rematch of sorts with both contestants switching sides from 2016.

Francis George has been on Parliamentary Committees on External Affairs, Defence, Industry, and Commerce. He was nominated as the UDF candidate for the Parliament Constituency of Kottayam and won the Kottayam Parliament Constituency in the 2024 election to the 18th Lok Sabha.

== Personal life ==
Francis graduated from Christ College in Bangalore and has been graduated in law by the Law Academy at Trivandrum. He was formerly a banker.

He is the son of K. M. George, the founder of Kerala Congress. Francis George is married to Shiny Chettisseril. They have three children namely K. F. George, K. F. Jose and K. F. Jacob.
