= Kerala Congress (Nationalist) =

- Abbreviation: KEC(N)
- Leader: Kuruvilla Mathews
- Chairperson: Kuruvilla Mathews
- Secretary: M. N. Giri
- Founder: Noble Mathew, Kuruvilla Mathews And M. N. Giri
- Founded: March 2014
- Split from: Kerala Congress (M)
- Headquarters: Kottayam (India)
- Ideology: Indian nationalism
- Alliance: National Democratic Alliance

Kerala Congress (Nationalist) or KEC(N) is a state-level political party in Kerala, India. It was formed on 11 March 2014 through a split from KEC(M). Its leader is Kuruvilla Mathews.

The party contested the 2014 Indian general election in alliance with the Bharatiya Janata Party-led National Democratic Alliance, with Noble Mathew standing in the Kottayam Lok Sabha constituency.

== Split in Kerala Congress (Nationalist) and merger with BJP ==
Kerala Congress (Nationalist) split into two groups in 2016. One of the split groups was led by Noble Mathew & the other group led by Kuruvilla Mathews.

On 24 January 2016, former party Chairman Noble Mathew joined with the Bharatiya Janata Party at an event conducted in presence of BJP Kerala State President Kummanam Rajasekharan.

Kerala Congress Nationalist led by Kuruvilla Mathews is still with the National Democratic Alliance.

== Merger move of Kerala Congress factions within NDA ==
There is a move for grand-merger of Kerala Congress factions within NDA - Kerala Congress(D) of Ranjith Abraham Thomas, Kerala Congress(N) of Kuruvila Mathews, Kerala Congress(S) of Kallada Das, Kerala Vikas Congress (KVC) of Prof. Prakash Kuriakose along with National Progressive Party of V. V. Augustine along with some individual former Kerala Congress leaders like George J. Mathew, V. Surendran Pillai, Mathew Stephen, M. V. Mani, George Sebastian, Jerry Easow Oommen, etc.
