= N. M. Joseph =

Indian politician (1943–2022)

Neendukunnel Mathew Joseph (18 October 1943 – 13 September 2022) was an Indian politician who was a member of the 8th Kerala Legislative Assembly. N. M. Joseph is the son of Shri N. J. Mathew and Annamma Mathew. He married Elizabeth and has one son and one daughter. He was Minister of Forests from 1987 to 1991. He served as the Gen.secretary, Senior vice-president and President of Janata Dal (Secular) during multiple times.

Joseph was a professor at St. Thomas College in Pala before entering politics. He died in Kottayam on 13 September 2022, at the age of 78.
