= K. M. George (politician) =

Indian politician (1919–1976)

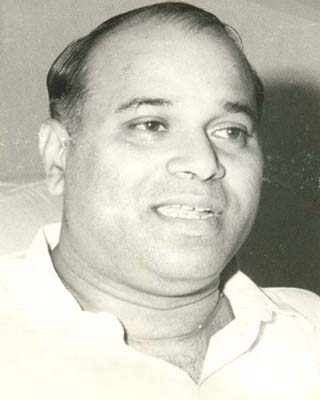
- K. M. George

Minister for Transport, Government of Kerala
- In office 26 June 1976 – 11 December 1976

Member of the Kerala Legislative Assembly
- In office 1970 – 1976
- Constituency: Poonjar

Minister for Transport and Health, Government of Kerala
- In office 1 November 1969 – 1 August 1970

Member of the Kerala Legislative Assembly
- In office 1967 – 1970
- Constituency: Poonjar

Member of the Kerala Legislative Assembly
- In office 1960 – 1964
- Constituency: Muvattupuzha

Member of the Kerala Legislative Assembly
- In office 1957 – 1959
- Constituency: Muvattupuzha

Personal details
- Born: 18 January 1919 Arakuzha, Muvattupuzha, Kingdom of Travancore (present day Ernakulam, Kerala, India)
- Died: 11 December 1976 (aged 57) Muvattupuzha, Ernakulam, Kerala, India
- Party: Kerala Congress
- Spouse: Marthamma
- Children: 5 (incl. Francis George)

Kalambattuparambil M. George (18 January 1919 – 11 December 1976) was an Indian politician from the state of Kerala. He is the founder Chairman of Kerala Congress, a political party in India.

== Political career ==
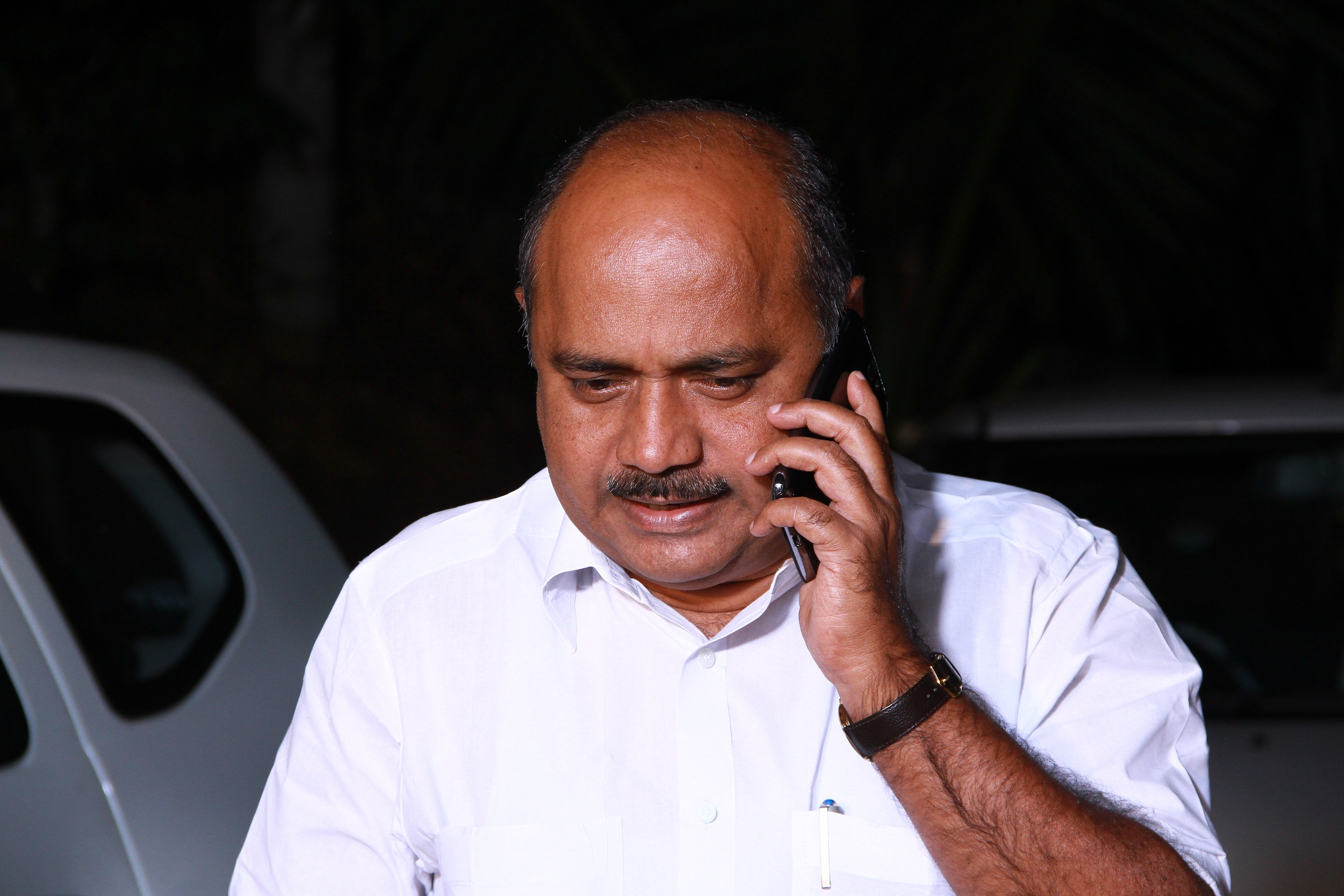
Francis George, Kerala Congress leader and the son of K. M. George

K. M. George began his political career in the Indian National Congress. Following the death of P. T. Chacko, Pullolil in 1964 under turbulent circumstances, 15 MLAs under the leadership of K. M. George withdrew their support to the Congress and, sitting as a separate group in the Assembly, brought down the R. Sankar ministry and formed a new political party called the Kerala Congress under his chairmanship at Kottayam.

== Personal life ==
George was born to the Kalambattuparambil family in Muvattupuzha on 18 January 1919. He was married to Marthamma Padinjarekkara and was survived by five children, one of whom is K. Francis George, who has represented the constituency of Idukki twice in the Parliament of India. George died on 11 December 1976, while serving as a Kerala state minister in the cabinet of C. Achutha Menon.

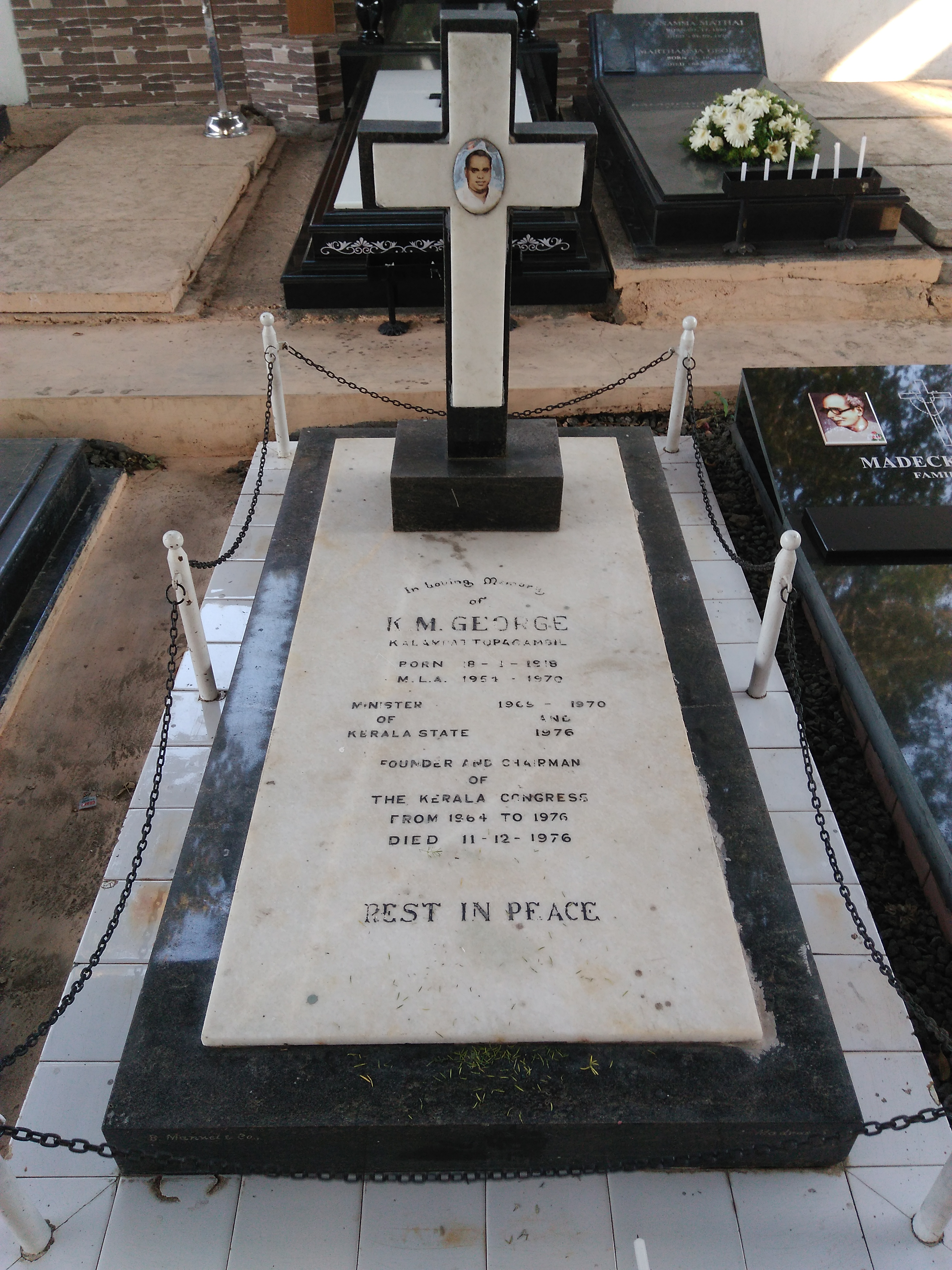
K M George Tomb Muvattupuzha
