= Skariah Thomas =

Indian politician (1943 – 2021)

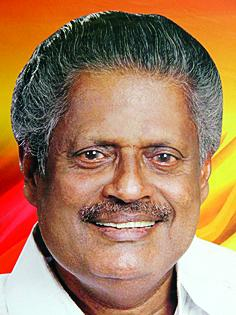

Skariah Thomas (31 March 1943 – 18 March 2021) was an Indian politician, a veteran leader of Kerala Congress and a former member of Lok Sabha from Kottayam during 1977–1984. He was the chairman of Kerala Congress (Skaria Thomas) faction group from 2015.

== Biography ==
He was the chairman of Kerala Congress (Skaria Thomas), which is one among several factions of the Kerala Congress. He was a member of the 6th and 7th Lok Sabha of India. He represented the Kottayam constituency of Kerala. He was in office from 1977 to 1984. He died on 18 March 2021 in Kochi due to post-COVID-19 complications.

== Personal life ==
Skariah Thomas was the son of KT Skaria and Achamma. He was married to Lalitha and the couple have 3 daughters, Nirmala, Anitha and Latha, and a son Sakariya. He died on 18 March 2021 while serving as the chairman of KSIE.
