= T. S. John =

Indian politician

T. S. John (21 October 1939 – 9 June 2016) was an Indian politician who was a founder member of Kerala Congress party and was its chairman. He was speaker of the Kerala Legislative Assembly and was a minister in A. K. Antony's cabinet in the Government of Kerala.
