= Kerala Congress =

- Abbreviation: KC
- Chairperson: P. J. Joseph
- Lok Sabha Leader: K. Francis George
- Founder: K. M. George; R. Balakrishna Pillai; Mathachan Kuruvinakunnel; Mannathu Padmanabha Pillai; Vayala Idiculla
- Founded: 9 October 1964; 61 years ago
- Headquarters: State Committee Office, Near Star Theatre junction, Kottayam, Kerala
- Student wing: Kerala Students Congress
- Youth wing: Kerala Youth Front
- Women's wing: Kerala Vanitha Congress
- Labour wing: Kerala Trade Union Congress
- Ideology: Liberalism; Regionalism
- Political position: Centre
- Colours: White; Red
- ECI status: State Party
- Alliance: UDF (1964–1989, 2010–present); INDIA (2023–present); LDF (1989–2010)
- Seats in Rajya Sabha: 0 / 245
- Seats in Lok Sabha: 1 / 543
- Seats in Kerala Legislative Assembly: 7 / 140

Election symbol

Kerala Congress is an Indian political party primarily active in central Kerala. it was founded in Kottayam, Kerala on 9 October 1964, by a block of former Indian National Congress leaders led by K. M. George. Initially, its main support came from the Syrian Christians and the Nair community of southern Kerala.

The establishment of the Kerala Congress could be traced to the resignation and later death of P. T. Chacko, the Home Minister in the R. Sankar-led Congress ministry (1962–64). Fifteen rebel Congress Members of the Legislative Assembly subsequently supported a successful no confidence motion on the Sankar Ministry. K. M. George, R. Balakrishna Pillai and other leaders backed by the Syro-Malabar Catholic Church and the Nair Service Society leader Mannathu Padmanabhan, formed the "Kerala Congress" at Kottayam Thirunakkara Ground on 9th October 1964.

== History ==
Kerala Congress was formed as a breakaway faction from Indian National Congress in 1964, led by K. M. George and R. Balakrishna Pillai. The party won 26 seats in the 1965 Kerala Assembly election.

George and Pillai were arrested and imprisoned during the National Emergency. Kerala Congress joined the C. Achutha Menon-led Kerala ministry in 1975 (R. Balakrishna Pillai and K. M. Mani as ministers). R. Balakrishna Pillai was later replaced by K. M. George (who died in 1976).

R. Balakrishna Pillai formed the Kerala Congress (B) in 1977.

K. M. Mani, with the Congress alliance, served as the Home Minister in the later K. Karunakaran and A. K. Antony led ministries (replaced in between by P. J. Joseph).

Kerala Congress (Mani) was formed from Kerala Congress in 1979.

== Kerala Congress (P. J. Joseph Era) (1979–2010) ==
However, Splinter fractions of R. Balakrishna Pillai and K. M. Mani merged with parent Kerala Congress led by P. J. Joseph in 1985.

These parties again split in 1987 by K. M. Mani, after the split in the same year since there was a big legal battle for the name and symbol between P. J. Joseph and K. M. Mani. The court ruled in favor of P. J. Joseph. In 1989, R. Balakrishnan Pillai also left Parent Kerala Congress.

P. J. Joseph was minister several times until 2010 representing Kerala Congress.

=== Merger with Kerala Congress (M) and dissolution (2010–2015) ===
In 2010, one of the founder's sons, P. C. Thomas, joined the Party. He was a Kerala Congress (M) member until 2001 and later formed his own party, the Indian Federal Democratic Party.

Later that year, Kerala Congress (J) and Kerala Congress (M) decide to merge into one party. P. C. Thomas did not support this merger and made his own fraction called Kerala Congress (Anti-merger Group).

Eventually, the Kerala Election Commission froze the party's name and symbol, thereby dissolving Kerala Congress.

== Revival of Kerala Congress (2016–present) ==
=== Alliance with NDA (P. C. Thomas Era (2016–2021)) ===
P. C. Thomas was a chairman of Kerala Congress (Anti-merger Group). In 2014, a power struggle erupted in that party and on 2015 Thomas left Kerala Congress (Anti-merger Group) and formed Kerala Congress (Thomas) but Left Democratic Front did not approve this split and kicked out Thomas from their alliance.

In August 2015, the Kerala Congress faction led by P. C. Thomas join the Kerala unit of the Bharatiya Janata Party-led National Democratic Alliance (NDA).

In 2016, after a long legal battle P. C. Thomas received approval to use the name as bracket less Kerala Congress party. So Thomas dissolved Kerala Congress (Thomas) and revived the Kerala Congress.

P. C. Thomas contested from Kottayam Lok Sabha constituency for NDA on 2019 Indian general election

In October 2020, it was reported that P. C. Thomas was leaving NDA and was likely to join the United Democratic Front (UDF). The party however decided to stay in the NDA and extended their support to NDA candidates in the 2020 Kerala local elections.

From 2016 to 2021 Kerala Congress was in an alliance with NDA (National Democratic Alliance).

On 17 March 2021, the party left the NDA. later the Kerala Congress (Joseph), which was part of the Congress-led UDF merged into bracket-less Kerala Congress. which lead to P. J. Joseph becoming the Kerala Congress Party chairman again.

=== 2021 Kerala Legislative Assembly election ===
After the merger with Kerala Congress, P. J. Joseph, and Mons Joseph resigned from the MLA post to avoid the technicalities regarding the Anti-Defection Law as they had won the assembly election in 2016 in KEC(M) tickets However, 8 out of 10 candidates of Kerala Congress lost in elections, only P. J. Joseph and Mons Joseph were re-elected to the legislative assembly from Thodupuzha and Kaduthuruthy respectively.

== Splinter Factions of Kerala Congress ==
=== Parties in UDF ===
- KEC of P. J. Joseph
- KEC(J) of Anoop Jacob

=== Parties in LDF ===
- KEC(M) of Jose K. Mani
- KEC(B) of K. B. Ganesh Kumar
- JKC of Dr. K. C. Joseph and Antony Raju
- KEC(ST) of Binoy Joseph

=== Parties in NDA ===
- KEC(D) Ranjith Abraham Thomas of Ranjith Abraham Thomas
- KEC(D) Rajesh Puliyaneth of Adv. Rajesh Puliyaneth
- KEC(N) of Kuruvila Mathews
- KEC(S) of Kallada Das
- KVC of Prof. Prakash Kuriakose

There is a move for grand-merger of Kerala Congress factions within NDA - Kerala Congress (B) Ranjith of Ranjith Abraham Thomas, Kerala Congress(N) of Kuruvila Mathews, Kerala Congress(S) of Kallada Das, Kerala Vikas Congress (KVC) of Prof. Prakash Kuriakose along with National Progressive Party of V. V. Augustine along with some individual former Kerala Congress leaders like George J. Mathew, V. Surendran Pillai, Mathew Stephen, M. V. Mani, George Sebastian, Jerry Easow Oommen, etc.

=== Parties with Trinamool Congress ===
- Kerala Congress (D) Saji Manjakadambil of Saji Manjakadambil (to be merge with All India Trinamool Congress)

== Party organisation ==
=== Leadership ===
On 27 April a meeting convened online by the party leadership in Thodupuzha and chose P.J Joseph as party chairman and PC Thomas as working chairman. Mons Joseph has been elected as the Executive Chairman, Francis George, Johnny Nelloor and Thomas Unniyadan as deputy chairman, while Joy Abraham is the secretary-general.

== Electoral performance ==
Loksabha election results in Kerala
Election Year	Alliance	Seats contested	Seats won	Total Votes	Percentage of votes	± Vote
2024	UDF	1	1 / 20	364,631	1.84%	New
2009	LDF	1	0 / 20	333,688	2.09%	▼0.26%
2004	LDF	1	1 / 20	353,905	2.35%	▼0.05%
1999	LDF	1	1 / 20	365,313	2.40%	▲0.20%
1998	LDF	1	0 / 20	327,649	2.20%	▼0.03%
1996	LDF	1	0 / 20	320,539	2.23%	▼0.01%
1991	LDF	1	0 / 20	319,933	2.24%	▲1.78%
1989	LDF	1	0 / 20	68,811	0.46%	▼1.91%
1984	UDF	1	0 / 20	258,591	2.37%	▼2.00%
1980	UDF	2	1 / 20	356,997	4.37%	▼1.23%
1977	UDF	2	2 / 20	491,674	5.6%	▼2.70%
1971	UDF	3	3 / 19	542,431	8.3%	▲3,18%
1967	UDF	5	0 / 19	321,219	5.12%	New

Kerala Legislative Assembly election results
Election Year	Alliance	Seats contested	Seats won	Total Votes	Percentage of votes	± Vote
2026	UDF	8	7 / 140	5,25,323	2.43	▲0.23
2021	UDF	10	2 / 140	554,115	2.66%	▲2.48%
2016	UDF	3	0 / 140	37,108	0.18%	
2006	LDF	6	4 / 140	271,854	1.75%	▼1.15%
2006	LDF	10	2 / 140	455,748	2.9%	▼0.20%
1996	LDF	10	6 / 140	442,421	3.10%	▼0.27%
1991	LDF	10	1 / 140	477,849	3.37%	▼0.17%
1987	LDF	14	5 / 140	451,159	3.54%	▼0.90%
1982	UDF	12	8 / 140	435,200	4.55%	▼0.40%
1980	UDF	17	6 / 140	471,817	4.95%	▼3.43%
1977	UDF	22	20 / 140	734,879	8.38%	▲2.47%
1970	UDF	31	12 / 140	445,232	5.91%	▼1.66%
1967	Steady	61	5 / 133	475,172	7.57%	▼5.01%
1965	Steady	54	23 / 133	796,291	12.58%	New

== Notable leaders of various factions of Kerala Congress ==
- K. M. George
- O. V. Lukose
- K. M. Mani
- Mathachan Kuruvinakunnel
- R. Balakrishna Pillai
- M. V. Mani
- P. K. Ittoop
- E. John Jacob
- K. R. Saraswathy Amma
- Vayala Idiculla
- T. S. John
- K. Mohandas
- Sam Oommen
- Thomas Kallampally
- P. J. Joseph
- P. C. Thomas
- Mons Joseph
- C. F. Thomas
- Francis George
- Thomas Unniyadan
- Joy Abraham
- Prince Lukose
- T. M. Jacob
- Oommen Mathew
