= Janadhipathya Kerala Congress =

- Abbreviation: JKC
- Chairperson: K. C. Joseph
- Founder: K. Francis George
- Founded: 9 March 2016; 10 years ago
- Split from: Kerala Congress (M)
- Headquarters: Near Jawahar Balbhavan, Building No. 641, Ward No. 21, Kottayam Municipality, District – Kottayam, Kerala.
- Student wing: Janadhipathiya Kerala Students Congress
- Youth wing: Janadhipathiya Kerala Youthfront
- Ideology: Socialism
- Political position: Left-wing
- Colours: White and Red
- ECI Status: Registered-Unrecognized
- Alliance: Left Democratic Front (LDF)
- Seats in Kerala Legislative Assembly: 0 / 140
- Number of states and union territories in government: 0 / 31

Janadhipathya Kerala Congress (JKC) also known as Democratic Kerala Congress, is an Indian political party in Kerala. It was formed on 9 March 2016, through a split from the KEC(M)

== History ==
In 2016, before Kerala Legislative Assembly elections a disagreement developed in Kerala Congress (M) about seats and where who contest LDF used this opportunity and splits Kerala Congress (M). Several of P. J. Joseph's supporters left the party because they felt everyone with Joseph was being sidelined. Politicians including K. Francis George, K. C. Joseph, P. C. Joseph and Antony Raju left Kerala Congress (M) looking for better chances.

However all of them wanted KC(J) as their new party's abbreviation and purposed Kerala Congress (Janadhipathyam) as name. However the Election Commission give JKC as their abbreviation and Janadhipathya Kerala Congress as their name.

K. Francis George was elected chairman of the new party which contested in the 2016 assembly elections but did not win any seats.

In 2019, K. Francis George left the party and joined Kerala Congress. On 14 March 2020, Dr. K. C. Joseph was elected as the new chairman of Janadhipathya Kerala Congress. They decided to stay with the LDF.

== Minister from JKC ==
- Antony Raju (2021- 2023)

== Main Leaders of JKC ==
- K. C. Joseph
- P. C. Joseph
- Antony Raju
- Vamanapuram Prakashkumar
- Thomas Fernandes
- Adv. Francis Thomas
- George Augustine
- Prof. Jacob M. Abraham
- Kochara Mohanan Nair
- Raju Neduvampuram
- Mathews George

== Electoral performance ==
Kerala Legislative Assembly election results
Election Year	Alliance	Seats contested	Seats won	Total Votes	Percentage of votes	+/- Vote
2016	LDF	4	0 / 140	157,584	0.78%	New
2021	LDF	1	1 / 140	48,748	0.23%	▼0.55%
