= Kerala Congress (Thomas) =

Kerala Congress (Thomas) Or Thomas Group
- Abbreviation: KEC(T)
- Leader: P. C. Thomas
- Founded: 2015; 11 years ago
- Dissolved: 2016; 10 years ago
- Split from: Kerala Congress (Anti-merger Group)
- Succeeded by: Kerala Congress
- Headquarters: 67, Kumaranasn Nagar, Kadavanthara, P.O. Ernakulam, Kerala.
- Colours: Half white and half red
- ECI status: Registered-Unrecognized

Election symbol

Kerala Congress (Thomas) or Thomas Group was a political party in India from 2015 to 2016 and a Kerala Congress faction led by P. C. Thomas from 2016 to 2021.

After the Permission of using the name as bracket less Kerala Congress in 2016, Thomas dissolved Kerala Congress (Thomas) and revived Parent Kerala Congress. so his fraction became official Kerala Congress from 2016 to 2021.

In 2021 it merged with its own parent fraction called Joseph Group.

== History ==
P.C Thomas was the chairman of Kerala Congress (Anti-merger Group). Since 2014 a power struggle erupted in that party and 2015 Thomas left Kerala Congress (Anti-merger Group) and formed Kerala Congress (Thomas).

In August 2015, the Kerala Congress Fraction led by P. C. Thomas joined the Kerala unit of the Bharatiya Janata Party-led National Democratic Alliance (NDA).

In 2016, after a long legal battle P. C. Thomas received approval to use the name as bracketless Kerala Congress party. So Thomas dissolved Kerala Congress (Thomas) and revived Kerala Congress, and since then to 2021 Kerala Congress (Thomas) was the Bracketless Kerala Congress party.

Kerala congress participated in 2016 elections as a part of National Democratic Alliance. The party had been provided five seats in 2016 Kerala Legislative Assembly election, and PC Thomas contested from Kottayam (Lok Sabha constituency) for NDA on 2019 Indian general election

In October 2020, it was reported that P. C. Thomas was leaving NDA and was likely to join the United Democratic Front (UDF). The party however decided to stay in the NDA and extended their support to NDA candidates in the 2020 Kerala local elections.

On 17 March 2021, P. C. Thomas announced that the party has merged with Kerala Congress (Joseph) to form Kerala Congress, with him being its Deputy Chairman.

== See also ==
- Kerala Congress
- Kerala Congress (Joseph)
- Indian Federal Democratic Party
