= George J. Mathew =

Indian politician (born 1939)

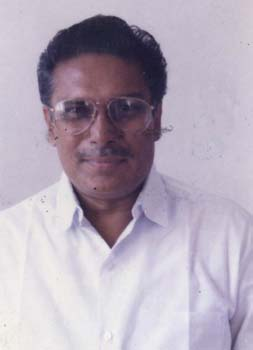
- Headshot of Mr. Mathew for the parliamentary elections

Member of the Legislative Assembly
- In office 1991–2006
- Preceded by: K. J. Thomas
- Succeeded by: Alphons Kannanthanam
- Constituency: Kanjirappally

Member of Parliament, Lok Sabha
- In office 1977·1980

Personal details
- Born: 3 August 1939 (age 86) Kanjirappally, Kerala, India
- Party: Kerala Congress (Until 1983), INC (Began in 1983)
- Spouse: Meera
- Children: 3 Sons & 1 Daughter
- As of 20 February, 2021 Source: [കേരള നിയമസഭ ]

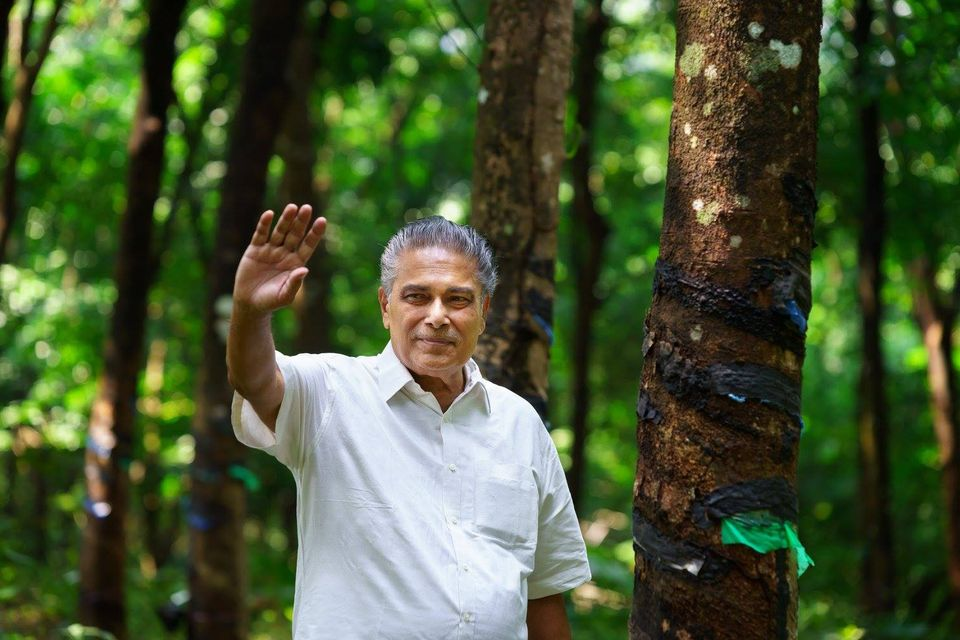
George J. Mathew

George J. Mathew (/ˈmæθjuː/ "Matthew"; born 3 August 1939) is an Indian politician and a senior Congress leader from the Kottayam district who served as a Member of the Legislative Assembly from Kanjirappally from 1991 to 2006 as well as a former Lok Sabha member.

== Early life and education ==
Mr. George was born on August 3, 1939, to K. V. Mathew and Thresyamma Mathew in a village known as "Koottickal" of the Kanjirapalli taluk within the Kottayam district. He attended the Bangalore European School as well as the Madras Loyola College. His highest qualification is a Bachelor's degree, of a Bachelor of Science (BSc).

== Political career ==
Mr. George, who started his political career as a Congress worker, joined the party Kerala Congress in 1964 when it was formed, but later left the Kerala Congress in 1983 and returned to its parent party, the Indian National Congress, after the splits in the party continued. From 1977 to 1980, he was elected as a member of the Lok Sabha from Muvattupuzha constituency. From 1991 to 2006, he was a Member of Legislative Assembly from Kanjirapally for 15 consecutive years.

Political Roles

- 1971-1978: Treasurer, Kerala
- 1977-1980: Member of Lok Sabha, Muvattupuzha
- 1977-1979: Kerala Congress, Parliamentary Party Leader, Lok Sabha
- 1980-1983: Chairman, Kerala Congress
- 1983: Return to the Congress party
- 1991–1996, 1996–2001, 2001–2006: Member of Legislative Assembly, Kanjirapally.

Other Designations

- 2003 Director, Rashtra Deepika
- Chairman & MD, State Spices and Leaf Supply Company
- Member of Plantations Labor Committee, Rubber Board, Kanjirapally Rotary Club
- Book Written : "Anubhavangal Adiyozhukkukal"

== Personal life ==
- Wife: Meera George
- Children: 3 Sons and 1 Daughter

== Elections participated in ==
Elections Participated in
Year	Constituency	Winning candidate	Party/Affiliation	Primary Opposition	Party/Affiliation	Secondary Opposition	Party/Affiliation
1980	Muvatupuzha Lok-Sabha Constituency	George Joseph Mundakkal	Independent Candidate	George J. Mathew	Kerala Congress		
1977	Muvatupuzha Lok-Sabha Constituency	George J. Mathew	Kerala Congress	K. M. Joseph Kuruppamadham	K. C. P		

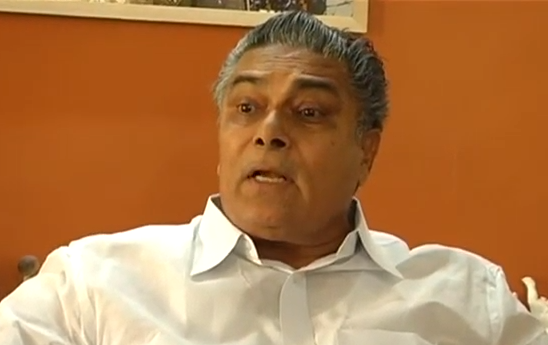
Mr. Mathew attending an interview by Kanjirappilly reporters
