= Kerala Congress (Skaria Thomas) =

- Chairperson: Binoy Joseph
- Founder: Skariah Thomas
- Founded: 2015
- Split from: Kerala Congress (Anti-merger Group)
- Headquarters: Chingavanam in Building No. 711, Ward No.6, Kottayam Municipality, Kottayam, District- Kottayam, Kerala
- Alliance: Left Democratic Front (LDF)

Election symbol

Kerala Congress (Skaria Thomas) is a political party in Kerala, India, formed after a split in Kerala Congress (Anti-merger Group). The party was led by the late Skariah Thomas.

It is a part of Left Democratic Front (LDF).

== Party Organisation ==
Binoy Joseph is the chairman of the party.

=== Other Notable leaders ===
- Skaria Thomas
