= Kerala Congress (Joseph) =

Kerala Congress (J) കേരള കോൺഗ്രസ്‌ (ജോസഫ്)
- Abbreviation: KEC(J)
- Chairperson: P. J. Joseph
- Founder: P. J. Joseph
- Founded: 1979
- Dissolved: 2021
- Merged into: Kerala Congress
- Headquarters: State Committee Office, Near Star Theatre junction, Kottayam, Kerala
- Student wing: Kerala Students Congress
- Youth wing: Kerala Youth Front
- Women's wing: Kerala Vanitha Congress
- Labour wing: Kerala Trade Union Congress
- Colours: White and Red
- ECI status: State Party

Election symbol
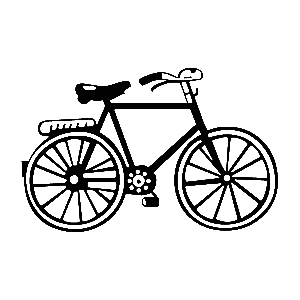

Kerala Congress (Joseph) [Abbr. KEC(J)] was a political party in the Indian state of Kerala. It was formed in 1979. KEC(J) was the breakaway faction of Kerala Congress. The party merged with Kerala Congress (KEC).

== History ==
Kerala Congress (J), also known as Kerala Congress (Joseph) is a faction of the Kerala Congress led by P. J. Joseph. After the split in 1979, Kerala news media started calling the original Kerala Congress party as Kerala Congress (Joseph).

=== Reunited (1985) ===
In 1985, Kerala congress leaders K. M. Mani (from Kerala Congress (M)) and R. Balakrishna Pillai (from Kerala Congress (B)) merged with Kerala Congress to form a united Kerala Congress.

=== Split Again (1987 and 1989) ===
In 1987 K.M Mani left Kerala Congress and revived his Fraction Known as Kerala Congress (Mani). And in 1989 R. Balakrishna Pillai left Kerala Congress to revive Kerala Congress (B).

P. J. Joseph continued in United Democratic Front (UDF) till 1989. After the issue raised in the Muvattupuzha Lok Sabha constituency, Joseph left the alliance and joined LDF. Since 1991, Joseph's party became part of the Left Democratic Front (LDF) as an alliance.

== Merger With Kerala Congress (M) (2010) ==
In 2010, Joseph Group had merged with Kerala Congress (M). However, a faction led by P.C Thomas did not support this merger. The faction of P.C Thomas formed the Kerala Congress (Anti-merger group) and stayed in LDF. For the 2011 Kerala Assembly elections, both P. J. Joseph and P. C. Thomas claimed that their respective factions were entitled to the original party, but the Election Commission froze the claims and directed the followers of Joseph to contest under the name of the Kerala Congress (M) to which it had united, and the followers of Thomas to contest under the name Kerala Congress (Anti-merger group), which ultimately dissolved the original Kerala Congress party (from 2011-2016). In 2016 P.C Thomas revived the Kerala congress party. So, his faction of the Kerala Congress party was called by the media as Kerala Congress (Thomas).

== Revival of Kerala Congress (Joseph) or Joseph Group (split) (2019) ==
After the death of K.M Mani in April 2019, his son and a group of his followers tried to take over party control which caused to form another Group led by another Senior leader P.J Joseph.

In 2019 June, the media declared as P. J. Joseph and C. F. Thomas revived Kerala Congress (J) by splitting from Kerala Congress (M).

In July, both groups announced a split and claimed the party symbol and name. The faction led by Jose K. Mani was expelled from the UDF for not vacating the presidency of the Kottayam district panchayat for the faction led by P. J. Joseph. Following this, Jose announced the intention of his faction to join the LDF in October 2020.

=== Re-joining to Kerala Congress (2021) ===
Since 1979, P.J Joseph was the chairman of the original Kerala Congress party. By 2011, Election Commission of India froze the Kerala Congress party's name and symbol, which ultimately resulted in the dissolution of the Kerala Congress party. However, in 2016, P.C Thomas revived the previously dissolved Party. After the recent events happened that happened within Kerala Congress (M), PJ Joseph and his followers officially left Kerala Congress (M) in February 2021.

On 17 March 2021, P. C. Thomas announced that his party Kerala Congress had merged with the Joseph faction of Kerala Congress (M) with him being its Deputy Chairman. P.J. Joseph became the party chairman.

It also marked P.J. Joseph's return to the parent Kerala Congress party as chairman after 11 years.

== Leadership till 2011 ==
- P. J. Joseph - Founder and chairman
- Monce Joseph
- T. U. Kuruvilla
