= 2024 Indian general election in Kerala =

Elections for the 18th Lok Sabha seats in Kerala

- 26 April 2024

All 20 Kerala seats in the Lok Sabha
- Opinion polls
- Turnout: 72.04% (▼5.8pp)

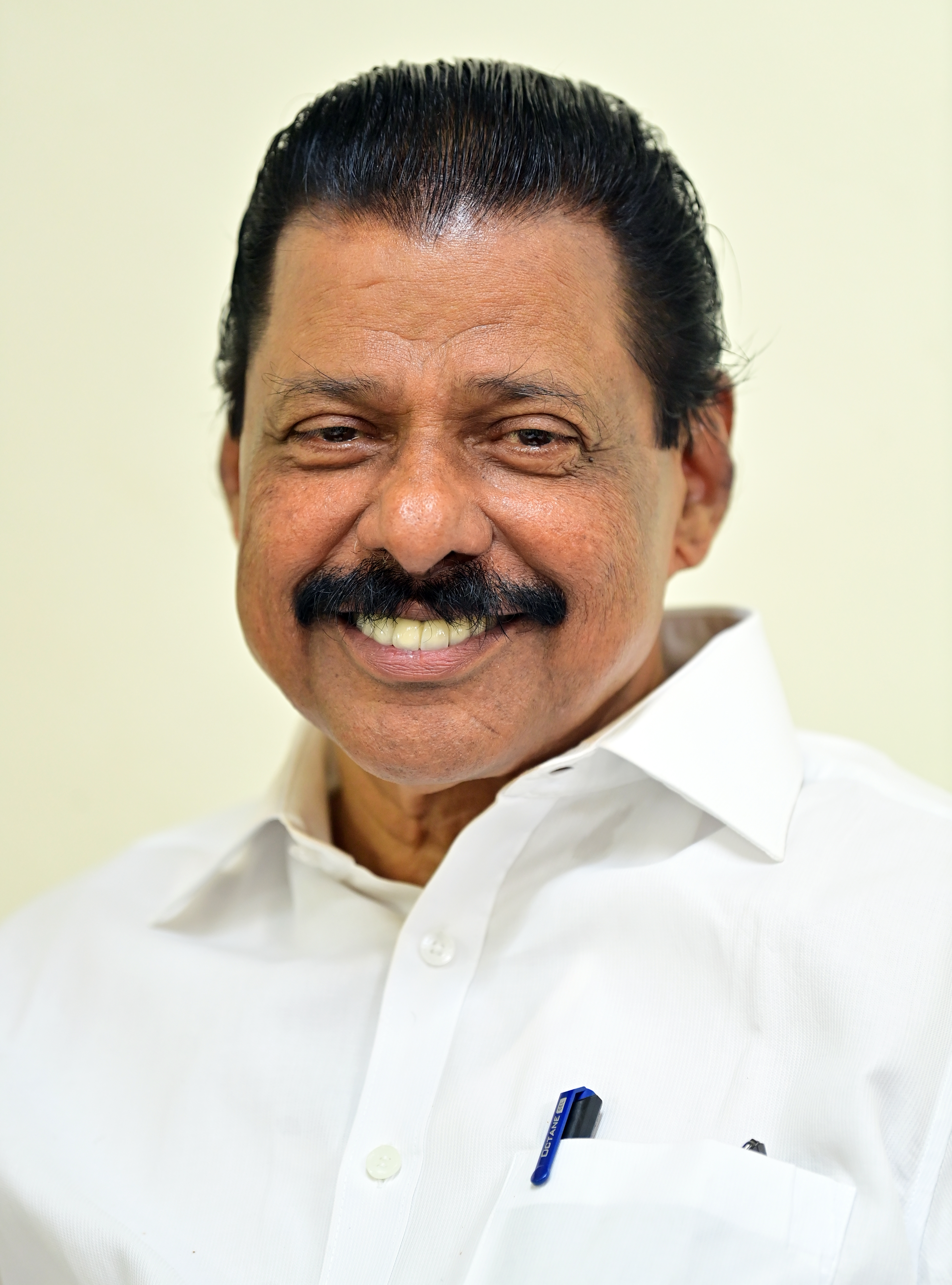

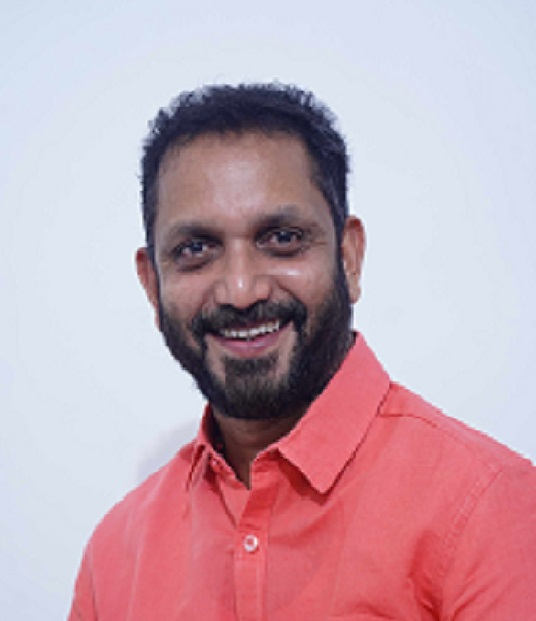
Leader	K. Sudhakaran	M. V. Govindan	K. Surendran
Alliance	UDF	LDF	NDA
Leader since	2021	2022	2020
Leader's seat	Kannur	Did not contest	Wayanad (lost)
Last election	47.48%, 19 seats	35.29%, 1 seat	15.64%, 0 seat
Seats won	18	1	1
Seat change	▼1	Steady	▲1
Popular vote	9,018,752	6,665,370	3,837,003
Percentage	45.40%	33.60%	19.40%
Swing	▼2.08 pp	▼2.69 pp	▲3.76 pp
Prime Minister before election
Narendra Modi
BJP
Elected Prime Minister
Narendra Modi
BJP

The 2024 Indian general election was held in Kerala on 26 April 2024 to elect all 20 members from the state to the 18th Lok Sabha. The result of the election was announced on 4 June 2024.

The United Democratic Front (UDF), led by Indian National Congress (INC), and Left Democratic Front (LDF), led by Communist Party of India (Marxist), contested separately in Kerala. This is in spite of both alliances being part of the Indian National Developmental Inclusive Alliance (INDIA) The UDF swept the elections winning 18 out of 20 seats, one less than in 2019. The Bharatiya Janata Party (BJP) won in Thrissur, their first ever Lok Sabha seat in Kerala, while the remaining seat was won by LDF.

== Election schedule ==
The elections to all 20 seats in Kerala was held on the second, out of seven, phase of the general election on 26 April 2024.

Poll event
Phase	II
No. of constituencies	20
Notification date	28 March
Last date for filing nomination	04 April
Scrutiny of nomination	05 April
Last date for withdrawal of nomination	08 April
Date of poll	26 April
Date of counting of votes/Result	04 June

== Parties and alliances ==
=== United Democratic Front ===
United Democratic Front

Party	Flag	Symbol	Leader	Seats contested
Indian National Congress			K. Sudhakaran	16
Indian Union Muslim League			Sadiq Ali Thangal	2
Revolutionary Socialist Party			Shibu Baby John	1
Kerala Congress			P. J. Joseph	1
Total				20

=== Left Democratic Front ===
Left Democratic Front

Party	Flag	Symbol	Leader	Seats contested
Communist Party of India (Marxist)			M.V. Govindan	15
Communist Party of India			Binoy Viswam	4
Kerala Congress (M)			Jose K. Mani	1
Total				20

=== National Democratic Alliance ===
National Democratic Alliance

Party	Flag	Symbol	Leader	Seats contested
Bharatiya Janata Party			K. Surendran	16
Bharath Dharma Jana Sena			Thushar Vellapally	4
Total				20

=== Others ===
Party	Symbol	Seats contested
Bahujan Samaj Party		18
Socialist Unity Centre of India (Communist)		8
Ambedkarite Party of India		3
Bahujan Dravida Party		3
Bharatheeya Jawan Kisan Party		3
Twenty 20 Party		2
Marxist Communist Party of India (United)		1
New Labour Party		1
People's Party of India (Secular)		1
Samajwadi Jan Parishad		1
Viduthalai Chiruthaigal Katchi		1
Total		42

== Candidates ==
The United Democratic Front fielded one, the Left Democratic Front fielded three and National Democratic Alliance fielded five women candidates.

Constituency							
Constituency		INDIA				NDA	
Constituency		UDF		LDF		NDA	
1	Kasaragod	INC	Rajmohan Unnithan	CPI(M)	M. V. Balakrishnan	BJP	M. L. Ashwini
2	Kannur	INC	K. Sudhakaran	CPI(M)	MV Jayarajan	BJP	C. Raghunath
3	Vatakara	INC	Shafi Parambil	CPI(M)	K. K. Shailaja	BJP	Prafulla Krishna
4	Wayanad	INC	Rahul Gandhi	CPI	Annie Raja	BJP	K. Surendran
5	Kozhikode	INC	M. K. Raghavan	CPI(M)	Elamaram Kareem	BJP	M. T. Ramesh
6	Malappuram	IUML	E. T. Mohammed Basheer	CPI(M)	V. Vaseef	BJP	M. Abdul Salam
7	Ponnani	IUML	Abdussamad Samadani	CPI(M)	K. S. Hamza	BJP	Niveditha Subramanian
8	Palakkad	INC	V. K. Sreekandan	CPI(M)	A. Vijayaraghavan	BJP	C. Krishnakumar
9	Alathur (SC)	INC	Ramya Haridas	CPI(M)	K. Radhakrishnan	BJP	T. N. Sarasu
10	Thrissur	INC	K Muraleedharan	CPI	V. S. Sunil Kumar	BJP	Suresh Gopi
11	Chalakudy	INC	Benny Behanan	CPI(M)	C. Raveendranath	BDJS	K. A. Unnikrishnan
12	Ernakulam	INC	Hibi Eden	CPI(M)	K. J. Shine	BJP	K. S. Radhakrishnan
13	Idukki	INC	Dean Kuriakose	CPI(M)	Joice George	BDJS	Sangeetha Vishwanathan
14	Kottayam	KEC	Francis George	KC(M)	Thomas Chazhikadan	BDJS	Thushar Vellapally
15	Alappuzha	INC	K. C. Venugopal	CPI(M)	A. M. Ariff	BJP	Sobha Surendran
16	Mavelikara (SC)	INC	Kodikunnil Suresh	CPI	C. A. Arun Kumar	BDJS	Baiju Kalasala
17	Pathanamthitta	INC	Anto Antony	CPI(M)	Thomas Issac	BJP	Anil Antony
18	Kollam	RSP	N. K. Premachandran	CPI(M)	Mukesh	BJP	G. Krishnakumar
19	Attingal	INC	Adoor Prakash	CPI(M)	V. Joy	BJP	V. Muraleedharan
20	Thiruvananthapuram	INC	Shashi Tharoor	CPI	Panniyan Raveendran	BJP	Rajeev Chandrasekhar

== Electorate ==
=== Electors by constituency ===
No.	Constituency	Male	Female	Third Gender	Total
1	Kasaragod	7,01,475	7,50,741	14	14,52,230
2	Kannur	6,46,181	7,12,181	6	13,58,368
3	Vatakara	6,81,615	7,40,246	22	14,21,883
4	Wayanad	7,21,054	7,41,354	15	14,62,423
5	Kozhikode	6,91,096	7,38,509	26	14,29,631
6	Malappuram	7,45,978	7,33,931	12	14,79,921
7	Ponnani	7,29,255	7,41,522	27	14,70,804
8	Palakkad	6,82,281	7,15,849	13	13,98,143
9	Alathur (SC)	6,48,437	6,89,047	12	13,37,496
10	Thrissur	7,08,317	7,74,718	20	14,83,055
11	Chalakudy	6,34,347	6,76,161	21	13,10,529
12	Ernakulam	6,40,662	6,83,370	15	13,24,047
13	Idukki	6,15,084	6,35,064	9	12,50,157
14	Kottayam	6,07,502	6,47,306	15	12,54,823
15	Alappuzha	6,74,066	7,26,008	9	14,00,083
16	Mavelikkara (SC)	6,30,307	7,01,564	9	13,31,880
17	Pathanamthitta	6,83,307	7,46,384	9	14,29,700
18	Kollam	6,31,625	6,95,004	19	13,26,648
19	Attingal	6,53,549	7,43,223	35	13,96,807
20	Thiruvananthapuram	6,89,155	7,41,317	59	14,30,531
	Total	1,34,15,293	1,43,33,499	367	2,77,49,159

=== Overseas electors by district ===
No.	District	Male Electors	Female Electors	Third Gender Electors	District Total
1	Kasargod	3,157	133	0	3,290
2	Kannur	13,276	599	0	13,875
3	Wayanad	714	65	0	779
4	Kozhikode	34,002	1,787	4	35,793
5	Malappuram	14,590	529	2	15,121
6	Palakkad	4,200	257	0	4,457
7	Thrissur	3,519	498	1	4,018
8	Ernakulam	1,991	515	0	2,506
9	Idukki	263	62	0	325
10	Kottayam	1,203	322	0	1,525
11	Alappuzha	1,513	286	0	1,799
12	Pathanamthitta	1,801	437	0	2,238
13	Kollam	1,673	244	2	1,919
14	Thiruvananthapuram	1,863	331	0	2,194
	Total	83,765	6,065	9	89,839

=== Electors by age ===
Age Group	Male Electors	Female Electors	Third Gender Electors	State Total
18-19	2,77,084	2,57,288	22	5,34,394
20-29	22,41,328	22,30,491	119	44,71,938
30-39	27,61,925	26,66,165	114	54,28,204
40-49	28,11,446	30,62,002	68	58,73,516
50-59	23,87,739	27,49,835	27	51,37,601
60-69	17,83,503	19,25,095	8	37,08,606
70-79	9,10,122	10,57,726	7	19,67,855
80+	2,42,146	3,84,897	2	6,27,045
	1,34,15,293	1,43,33,499	367	2,77,49,159

== Voter turnout ==
There was a significant dip in the voting percentages in all 20 constituencies as compared to the 2019 elections.

No.	Constituency	Electors	Votes Polled	Male	Female	Third Gender	Turnout %	Change %
1	Kasaragod	14,52,230	11,04,331	5,13,460	5,90,866	5	76.04	▼4.62
2	Kannur	13,58,368	10,48,839	4,85,112	5,63,724	3	77.21	▼6.07
3	Vatakara	14,21,883	11,14,950	5,07,584	6,07,362	4	78.41	▼4.29
4	Wayanad	14,62,423	10,75,921	5,20,885	5,55,033	3	73.57	▼6.80
5	Kozhikode	14,29,631	10,79,683	5,15,836	,563,835	12	75.52	▼6.18
6	Malappuram	14,79,921	10,79,547	5,19,332	5,60,211	4	72.95	▼2.55
7	Ponnani	14,70,804	10,19,889	4,67,726	5,52,148	15	69.34	▼5.64
8	Palakkad	13,98,143	10,28,627	4,95,567	5,33,051	9	73.57	▼4.20
9	Alathur (SC)	13,37,496	9,81,945	4,76,187	5,05,753	5	73.42	▼7.05
10	Thrissur	14,83,055	10,81,125	5,09,052	5,72,067	6	72.90	▼5.04
11	Chalakudy	13,10,529	9,42,787	4,60,351	4,82,428	8	71.94	▼8.57
12	Ernakulam	13,24,047	9,04,131	4,50,659	4,53,468	4	68.29	▼9.35
13	Idukki	12,50,157	8,31,936	4,25,598	4,06,332	6	66.55	▼9.81
14	Kottayam	12,54,823	8,23,237	4,18,285	4,04,946	6	65.61	▼9.86
15	Alappuzha	14,00,082	10,50,726	5,08,933	5,41,791	2	75.05	▼5.30
16	Mavelikkara (SC)	13,31,880	8,78,360	4,17,202	4,61,155	3	65.95	▼8.38
17	Pathanamthitta	14,29,700	9,06,051	4,42,897	4,63,148	6	63.37	▼10.93
18	Kollam	13,26,648	9,04,047	4,24,134	4,79,906	7	68.15	▼6.58
19	Attingal	13,96,807	9,70,517	4,49,212	5,21,292	13	69.48	▼5.0
20	Thiruvananthapuram	14,30,531	9,50,829	4,67,078	4,83,722	29	66.47	▼7.27
Total		2,77,49,159	1,97,77,478	94,75,090	1,03,02,238	150	71.27	▼6.57

^Since the postal votes of service voters are accepted till the counting day, total value may vary.

== Surveys and polls ==
=== Opinion polls ===
Polling agency	Date published (Note: Some polls did not differentiate between UDF and LDF, even though they are contesting separately.)	Margin of error					Lead
Polling agency	Date published	Margin of error	INDIA		NDA	Others	Lead
Polling agency	Date published	Margin of error	UDF	LDF	NDA	Others	Lead
ABP News-CVoter	April 2024	±3-5%	20	0	0	0	INDIA
Mathrubhumi News-P-MARQ	March 2024	±3%	17	3	0	0	INDIA
News 18	March 2024	±3%	17	2	1	0	INDIA
ABP News-CVoter	March 2024	±5%	19	1	0	0	INDIA
India TV-CNX	March 2024	±3%	16	3	1	0	INDIA
India Today-CVoter	February 2024	±3-5%	20		0	0	INDIA
Times Now-ETG	December 2023	±3%	15-17	3-5	0-1	0	INDIA
India TV-CNX	October 2023	±3%	18	2	0	0	INDIA
Times Now-ETG	September 2023	±3%	18-20		0-2	0	INDIA
Times Now-ETG	August 2023	±3%	18-20		0-2	0	INDIA

Polling agency	Date published (Note: Some polls did not differentiate between UDF and LDF, even though they are contesting separately.)	Margin of error					Lead
Polling agency	Date published	Margin of error	INDIA		NDA	Others	Lead
Polling agency	Date published	Margin of error	UDF	LDF	NDA	Others	Lead
ABP News-CVoter	April 2024	±3-5%	43%	31%	21%	5%	12
ABP News-CVoter	March 2024	±5%	44.5%	31.4%	19.8%	4.3%	13.1
India Today-CVoter	February 2024	±3-5%	78%		17%	5%	61
India Today-CVoter	August 2023	±3-5%	81%		14%	5%	67

The opinion polls and exit polls predicted a clear majority for the UDF.

=== Opinion polls (State-wise Alliances) ===
Polling agency	Date published	Margin of Error	I.N.D.I.A.		NDA	Others	Lead
Polling agency	Date published	Margin of Error	LDF	UDF	NDA	Others	Lead
Manorama News - CVoter	January 2024	3%	3	17	0	0	UDF
Reporter TV- Mega Survey	February 2024	2%	5	15	0	0	UDF
24 News - Jana Manasu	February 2024	5%	2	18	0	0	UDF
ABP News - CVoter	March 2024	±3%	0	20	0	0	UDF
CNN News18 - Mega Opinion Poll	March 2024	±3%	4	14	2	0	UDF
Mathrubhumi News-P-MARQ	March 2024	±3%	5-6	14-15	0	0	UDF

=== Exit polls ===
Polling agency					Lead
Polling agency	UDF	LDF	NDA	Others	Lead
ABP News-CVoter	17-19	0	1-3	0	UDF
India Today-Axis My India	17-18	0-1	1-3	0	UDF
India News-Dynamics	14-17	3-5	0-1	0	UDF
India TV-CNX	13-15	3-5	1-3	0	UDF
NDTV-Jan Ki Baat	14-17	3-5	0-1	0	UDF
CNN-CNBC-News 18	15-18	1-3	0	0	UDF
News 24-Today's Chanakya	15	1	4	0	UDF
News Nation	17-19	0	1-3	0	UDF
Republic TV-Matrize	17	3	0	0	UDF
Republic TV-PMarq	17	3	0	0	UDF
Times Now-ETG	14-15	4	1	0	UDF
Times Now-NavBharat	16-18	4	1	0	UDF
DB Live	17-19	2-3	0-1	0	UDF
TV9 Bharatvarsh- People's Insight - Polstrat			1		
Actual results	18	1	1	0	UDF

== Results ==
=== Results by alliance or party ===
Vote Share (By alliance)
1. UDF (45.4%)
2. LDF (33.3%)
3. NDA (19.2%)
4. Others (2.21%)

Alliance/ Party		Popular vote			Seats		
Alliance/ Party		Votes	%	±pp	Contested	Won	+/−
UDF	INC	70,03,971	35.06%	▼2.40%	16	14	▼1
UDF	IUML	12,06,522	6.07%	▲0.59%	2	2	Steady
UDF	RSP	4,43,628	2.24%	▼0.22%	1	1	Steady
UDF	KC	3,64,631	1.84%	New	1	1	▲1
UDF	Total	9,018,752	45.21%	▼2.27%	20	18	▼1
LDF	CPI(M)	51,61,034	26%		15	1	Steady
LDF	CPI	12,26,971	6.14%	▲0.06%	4	0	Steady
LDF	KC(M)	277,365	1.38%	▼0.70%	1	0	▼1
LDF	Total	6,665,370	33.60%	▼2.95%	20	1	Steady
NDA	BJP	3,296,354	16.68%	▲3.68%	16	1	▲1
NDA	BDJS	505,753	2.56%	▲0.68%	4	0	Steady
NDA	Total	3,802,107	19.24%	▲2.60%	20	1	▲1
Others					42	0	Steady
IND					92	0	Steady
NOTA		156,585	0.79%				
Total		19,777,478	100%	-	194	20	-

=== Results by constituency ===
Constituency		Turnout	Winner					Runner-up					Margin	
No.	Name	Turnout	Candidate	Party	Alliance	Votes	%	Candidate	Party	Alliance	Votes	%	Margin	
1	Kasaragod	76.76 ▼	Rajmohan Unnithan	INC	UDF	490,659	44.10	M. V. Balakrishnan	CPI(M)	LDF	390,010	35.06	Margin	100,649
2	Kannur	78.24 ▼	K. Sudhakaran	INC	UDF	518,524	48.74	M. V. Jayarajan	CPI(M)	LDF	409,542	38.50	108,982	
3	Vatakara	79.26 ▼	Shafi Parambil	INC	UDF	557,528	49.65	K. K. Shailaja	CPI(M)	LDF	443,022	39.45	114,506	
4	Wayanad	74.19 ▼	Rahul Gandhi	INC	UDF	647,445	59.69	Annie Raja	CPI	LDF	283,023	26.09	364,422	
5	Kozhikode	76.30 ▼	M. K. Raghavan	INC	UDF	520,421	47.74	Elamaram Kareem	CPI(M)	LDF	374,245	34.33	146,176	
6	Malappuram	73.44 ▼	E. T. Mohammed Basheer	IUML	UDF	644,006	59.35	V. Vaseef	CPI(M)	LDF	343,888	31.69	300,118	
7	Ponnani	69.78 ▼	M. P. Abdussamad Samadani	IUML	UDF	562,516	54.81	K. S. Hamza	CPI(M)	LDF	326,756	31.84	235,760	
8	Palakkad	74.16 ▼	V. K. Sreekandan	INC	UDF	421,169	40.66	A. Vijayaraghavan	CPI(M)	LDF	345,886	33.39	75,283	
9	Alathur (SC)	74.15 ▼	K. Radhakrishnan	CPI(M)	LDF	403,447	40.66	Ramya Haridas	INC	UDF	383,336	38.63	20,111	
10	Thrissur	73.63 ▼	Suresh Gopi	BJP	NDA	412,338	37.80	V. S. Sunil Kumar	CPI	LDF	337,652	30.95	74,686	
11	Chalakudy	72.72 ▼	Benny Behanan	INC	UDF	393,913	41.44	C. Raveendranath	CPI(M)	LDF	330,417	34.73	63,754	
12	Ernakulam	68.77 ▼	Hibi Eden	INC	UDF	482,317	52.97	K. J. Shine	CPI(M)	LDF	231,932	25.47	250,385	
13	Idukki	67.24 ▼	Dean Kuriakose	INC	UDF	432,372	51.43	Joice George	CPI(M)	LDF	298,645	35.53	133,727	
14	Kottayam	66.70 ▼	K. Francis George	KEC	UDF	364,631	43.60	Thomas Chazhikadan	KC(M)	LDF	277,365	33.17	87,266	
15	Alappuzha	75.99 ▼	K. C. Venugopal	INC	UDF	404,560	38.21	A. M. Ariff	CPI(M)	LDF	341,047	32.21	63,513	
16	Mavelikkara (SC)	67.07 ▼	Kodikunnil Suresh	INC	UDF	369,516	41.29	C. A. Arun Kumar	CPI	LDF	358,648	40.07	10,868	
17	Pathanamthitta	64.27 ▼	Anto Antony	INC	UDF	367,623	39.98	Thomas Isaac	CPI(M)	LDF	301,504	32.79	66,119	
18	Kollam	69.00 ▼	N. K. Premachandran	RSP	UDF	443,628	48.45	M. Mukesh	CPI(M)	LDF	293,326	32.03	150,302	
19	Attingal	70.44 ▼	Adoor Prakash	INC	UDF	328,051	33.29	V. Joy	CPI(M)	LDF	327,367	33.22	684	
20	Thiruvananthapuram	67.22 ▼	Shashi Tharoor	INC	UDF	353,679	37.19	Rajeev Chandrasekhar	BJP	NDA	342,078	35.52	16,077	

=== Results by alliance ===
No.	Constituency	UDF Votes	LDF Votes	NDA Votes
1	Kasaragod	490,659	390,010	219,558
2	Kannur	518,524	409,542	119,876
3	Vatakara	557,528	443,022	111,979
4	Wayanad	647,445	283,023	141,045
5	Kozhikode	520,421	374,245	180,666
6	Malappuram	644,006	343,888	85,361
7	Ponnani	562,516	326,756	124,798
8	Palakkad	421,169	345,886	251,778
9	Alathur (SC)	383,336	403,447	188,230
10	Thrissur	328,124	337,652	412,338
11	Chalakudy	394,171	330,417	106,400
12	Ernakulam	482,317	231,932	144,500
13	Idukki	432,372	298,645	91,323
14	Kottayam	364,631	277,365	165,046
15	Alappuzha	404,560	341,047	299,648
16	Mavelikkara (SC)	369,516	358,648	142,984
17	Pathanamthitta	367,623	301,504	234,406
18	Kollam	443,628	293,326	163,210
19	Attingal	328,051	327,367	311,779
20	Thiruvananthapuram	358,155	247,648	342,078

=== Results by state assembly constituency ===

Alliance	assembly segments.
UDF	111
LDF	18
NDA	11
Total assembly lead out of 140.

Alliance	2026 keralam assembly results .
UDF	102
LDF	35
NDA	03
Total assembly lead out of 140.

Alliance	assembly segments
UDF	23
LDF	108
NDA	9
Second position in the assembly segments (out of 140).

No.	Constituency	State assembly constituency	UDF	LDF	NDA	Lead	Runner-up	Margin
1	Kasaragod	Manjeshwaram	74,437	30,156	57,179	UDF	NDA	17,258
2	Kasaragod	Kasaragod	73,407	26,162	47,032	UDF	NDA	26,375
3	Kasaragod	Udma	72,448	60,489	31,245	UDF	LDF	11,959
4	Kasaragod	Kanhangad	69,171	67,121	29,301	UDF	LDF	2,050
5	Kasaragod	Thrikaripur	75,643	65,195	17,085	UDF	LDF	10,448
6	Kasaragod	Payyanur	58,184	71,441	18,466	LDF	UDF	13,257
7	Kasaragod	Kalliasseri	64,347	65,405	17,688	LDF	UDF	1,058
8	Kannur	Taliparamba	84,331	75,544	16,706	UDF	LDF	8,787
9	Kannur	Irikkur	81,144	46,358	13,562	UDF	LDF	34,786
10	Kannur	Azhikode	69,919	47,701	19,832	UDF	LDF	22,218
11	Kannur	Kannur	69,824	43,794	16,975	UDF	LDF	26,030
12	Kannur	Dharmadom	69,178	71,794	16,711	LDF	UDF	2,616
13	Kannur	Mattanur	67,432	70,466	19,159	LDF	UDF	3,034
14	Kannur	Peravoor	70,438	46,957	15,407	UDF	LDF	23,481
15	Vatakara	Thalassery	53,449	62,079	18,869	LDF	UDF	8,630
16	Vatakara	Kuthuparamba	72,134	61,242	20,710	UDF	LDF	10,892
17	Vatakara	Vatakara	72,366	50,284	13,612	UDF	LDF	22,082
18	Vatakara	Kuttiadi	91,782	68,147	11,586	UDF	LDF	23,635
19	Vatakara	Nadapuram	95,767	71,890	12,451	UDF	LDF	23,877
20	Vatakara	Koyilandy	82,099	58,036	20,699	UDF	LDF	24,063
21	Vatakara	Perambra	84,125	65,040	12,485	UDF	LDF	19,085
22	Wayanad	Mananthavady	79,026	40,305	25,503	UDF	LDF	38,721
23	Wayanad	Sulthan Bathery	84,439	40,458	35,709	UDF	LDF	43,981
24	Wayanad	Kalpetta	88,786	39,129	24,431	UDF	LDF	49,657
25	Wayanad	Thiruvambady	83,219	36,663	13,374	UDF	LDF	46,556
26	Wayanad	Eranad	95,194	37,451	9,723	UDF	LDF	57,743
27	Wayanad	Nilambur	99,325	42,962	17,520	UDF	LDF	56,363
28	Wayanad	Wandoor	112,310	43,626	13,608	UDF	LDF	68,684
29	Kozhikode	Balussery	84,834	67,200	22,714	UDF	LDF	17,634
30	Kozhikode	Elathur	69,632	59,141	29,609	UDF	LDF	10,491
31	Kozhikode	Kozhikode North	55,197	40,266	32,481	UDF	LDF	14,931
32	Kozhikode	Kozhikode South	55,671	34,608	25,943	UDF	LDF	21,063
33	Kozhikode	Beypore	76,654	57,093	25,943	UDF	LDF	19,561
34	Kozhikode	Kunnamangalam	88,054	64,752	32,860	UDF	LDF	23,302
35	Kozhikode	Koduvally	84,772	46,128	12,830	UDF	LDF	38,644
36	Malappuram	Kondotty	95,025	50,038	14,150	UDF	LDF	44,987
37	Malappuram	Manjeri	92,346	50,026	12,823	UDF	LDF	42,320
38	Malappuram	Perinthalmanna	85,319	58,520	10,486	UDF	LDF	26,799
39	Malappuram	Mankada	92,383	51,350	10,604	UDF	LDF	41,033
40	Malappuram	Malappuram	104,787	50,706	7,983	UDF	LDF	54,041
41	Malappuram	Vengara	90,142	33,745	7,414	UDF	LDF	56,397
42	Malappuram	Vallikunnu	80,307	47,125	21,069	UDF	LDF	33,182
43	Ponnani	Tirurangadi	92,980	38,833	11,393	UDF	LDF	54,147
44	Ponnani	Tanur	83,556	41,587	14,861	UDF	LDF	41,969
45	Ponnani	Tirur	99,468	49,138	12,592	UDF	LDF	50,330
46	Ponnani	Kottakkal	93,070	47,143	14,406	UDF	LDF	45,927
47	Ponnani	Thavanur	66,681	48,665	24,204	UDF	LDF	18,016
48	Ponnani	Ponnani	63,995	48,579	20,115	UDF	LDF	15,416
49	Ponnani	Thrithala	59,820	50,617	26,162	UDF	LDF	9,203
50	Palakkad	Pattambi	75,240	48,104	22,208	UDF	LDF	27,136
51	Palakkad	Shornur	52,366	56,117	36,409	LDF	UDF	3,781
52	Palakkad	Ottapalam	57,063	54,855	42,091	UDF	LDF	2,208
53	Palakkad	Kongad	52,851	46,193	34,606	UDF	LDF	6,658
54	Palakkad	Mannarkkad	78,478	46,374	22,715	UDF	LDF	32,104
55	Palakkad	Malampuzha	49,295	55,815	48,467	LDF	UDF	6,520
56	Palakkad	Palakkad	52,779	34,640	43,072	UDF	NDA	9,707
57	Alathur	Tarur	46,890	52,082	24,198	LDF	UDF	5,192
58	Alathur	Chittur	56,844	55,372	24,157	UDF	LDF	1,472
59	Alathur	Nenmara	56,768	55,451	26,867	UDF	LDF	1,317
60	Alathur	Alathur	46,894	55,692	22,612	LDF	UDF	8,798
61	Alathur	Chelakkara	55,195	60,368	28,974	LDF	UDF	5,173
62	Alathur	Kunnamkulam	54,722	58,549	29,378	LDF	UDF	3,827
63	Alathur	Wadakkanchery	61,918	61,304	30,255	UDF	LDF	614
64	Thrissur	Guruvayur	57,925	50,519	45,049	UDF	LDF	7,406
65	Thrissur	Manalur	50,897	53,183	61,196	NDA	LDF	8,013
66	Thrissur	Ollur	47,639	48,633	58,996	NDA	LDF	10,363
67	Thrissur	Thrissur	40,940	34,253	55,057	NDA	UDF	14,117
68	Thrissur	Nattika	38,195	52,909	66,854	NDA	LDF	13,945
69	Thrissur	Irinjalakuda	46,499	45,022	59,515	NDA	UDF	13,016
70	Thrissur	Puthukkad	42,719	49,943	62,635	NDA	LDF	12,692
71	Chalakudy	Kaipamangalam	47,598	58,286	19,077	LDF	UDF	10,688
72	Chalakudy	Chalakudy	56,502	50,786	14,185	UDF	LDF	5,716
73	Chalakudy	Kodungallur	51,725	52,091	23,836	LDF	UDF	366
74	Chalakudy	Perumbavoor	55,873	41,923	15,180	UDF	LDF	13,950
75	Chalakudy	Angamaly	57,791	40,924	9,869	UDF	LDF	16,867
76	Chalakudy	Aluva	68,204	44,283	15,414	UDF	LDF	23,921
77	Chalakudy	Kunnathunad	52,523	39,089	8,145	UDF	TTP	13,434
78	Ernakulam	Kalamassery	76,227	37,780	21,144	UDF	LDF	38,447
79	Ernakulam	Paravur	68,989	42,594	23,737	UDF	LDF	26,395
80	Ernakulam	Vypen	63,996	34,128	15,145	UDF	LDF	29,868
81	Ernakulam	Kochi	68,365	28,079	15,072	UDF	LDF	40,286
82	Ernakulam	Thrippunithura	69,661	37,696	27,951	UDF	LDF	31,965
83	Ernakulam	Ernakulam	57,962	20,893	18,320	UDF	LDF	37,069
84	Ernakulam	Thrikkakara	73,789	28,889	22,204	UDF	LDF	44,900
85	Idukki	Muvattupuzha	69,981	42,361	13,248	UDF	LDF	27,620
86	Idukki	Kothamangalam	63,391	42,910	11,497	UDF	LDF	20,481
87	Idukki	Devikulam	54,160	41,723	9,205	UDF	LDF	12,437
88	Idukki	Udumbanchola	53,085	46,325	14,316	UDF	LDF	6,760
89	Idukki	Thodupuzha	69,900	36,280	16,413	UDF	LDF	33,620
90	Idukki	Idukki	58,348	42,753	14,680	UDF	LDF	15,595
91	Idukki	Peerumade	58,264	43,623	11,304	UDF	LDF	14,641
92	Kottayam	Piravom	61,586	45,931	21,777	UDF	LDF	15,655
93	Kottayam	Pala	52,295	39,830	22,505	UDF	LDF	12,465
94	Kottayam	Kaduthuruthy	51,830	40,356	20,889	UDF	LDF	11,474
95	Kottayam	Vaikom	40,066	45,262	27,515	LDF	UDF	5,196
96	Kottayam	Ettumanoor	46,871	37,261	24,412	UDF	LDF	9,610
97	Kottayam	Kottayam	46,644	31,804	24,214	UDF	LDF	14,840
98	Kottayam	Puthuppally	59,077	31,974	21,915	UDF	LDF	27,103
99	Alappuzha	Aroor	60,978	49,962	37,491	UDF	LDF	11,016
100	Alappuzha	Cherthala	62,701	61,858	40,474	UDF	LDF	843
101	Alappuzha	Alappuzha	65,718	47,300	35,594	UDF	LDF	18,418
102	Alappuzha	Ambalappuzha	52,212	37,657	37,547	UDF	LDF	14,555
103	Alappuzha	Haripad	48,466	41,769	47,121	UDF	NDA	1,345
104	Alappuzha	Kayamkulam	50,216	48,020	48,775	UDF	NDA	1,441
105	Alappuzha	Karunagappally	57,955	49,030	48,839	UDF	LDF	8,925
106	Mavelikara	Changanassery	54,843	38,393	14,276	UDF	LDF	16,450
107	Mavelikara	Kuttanad	45,736	44,865	15,553	UDF	LDF	871
108	Mavelikara	Mavelikara	49,317	55,483	24,584	LDF	UDF	6,166
109	Mavelikara	Chengannur	49,031	47,393	25,424	UDF	LDF	1,638
110	Mavelikara	Kunnathur	59,155	60,502	22,473	LDF	UDF	1,347
111	Mavelikara	Kottarakkara	53,526	56,929	20,999	LDF	UDF	3,403
112	Mavelikara	Pathanapuram	50,601	49,143	17,261	UDF	LDF	1,458
113	Pathanamthitta	Kanjirappally	50,705	40,905	30,013	UDF	LDF	9,800
114	Pathanamthitta	Poonjar	51,932	39,322	27,053	UDF	LDF	12,610
115	Pathanamthitta	Thiruvalla	53,299	41,769	31,444	UDF	LDF	11,530
116	Pathanamthitta	Ranni	46,594	36,997	30,758	UDF	LDF	9,597
117	Pathanamthitta	Aranmula	59,626	44,939	38,545	UDF	LDF	14,717
118	Pathanamthitta	Konni	47,488	44,909	34,619	UDF	LDF	2,579
119	Pathanamthitta	Adoor	51,313	49,047	38,740	UDF	LDF	2,266
120	Kollam	Chavara	64,842	38,996	18,965	UDF	LDF	25,846
121	Kollam	Punalur	62,748	44,704	24,703	UDF	LDF	18,044
122	Kollam	Chadayamangalam	64,178	49,559	23,064	UDF	LDF	14,619
123	Kollam	Kundara	72,496	45,391	23,787	UDF	LDF	27,105
124	Kollam	Kollam	60,410	36,618	20,519	UDF	LDF	23,792
125	Kollam	Eravipuram	60,356	36,678	18,255	UDF	LDF	23,678
126	Kollam	Chathannoor	52,486	36,915	31,643	UDF	LDF	15,571
127	Attingal	Varkala	39,806	45,930	40,816	LDF	NDA	5,114
128	Attingal	Attingal	42,006	46,161	52,448	NDA	LDF	6,287
129	Attingal	Chirayinkeezhu	47,695	44,874	42,929	UDF	LDF	2,821
130	Attingal	Nedumangad	50,437	50,042	45,180	UDF	LDF	395
131	Attingal	Vamanapuram	50,667	45,617	40,170	UDF	LDF	5,050
132	Attingal	Aruvikkara	49,607	47,375	38,333	UDF	LDF	2,232
133	Attingal	Kattakkada	43,055	41,716	47,834	NDA	UDF	4,779
134	Thiruvananthapuram	Kazhakkoottam	39,602	34,382	50,444	NDA	UDF	10,842
135	Thiruvananthapuram	Vattiyoorkavu	44,863	28,336	53,025	NDA	UDF	8,162
136	Thiruvananthapuram	Thiruvananthapuram	48,296	27,076	43,755	UDF	NDA	4,541
137	Thiruvananthapuram	Nemom	39,101	33,322	61,227	NDA	UDF	22,126
138	Thiruvananthapuram	Parassala	59,026	46,654	45,957	UDF	LDF	12,372
139	Thiruvananthapuram	Kovalam	64,042	39,137	47,376	UDF	NDA	16,666
140	Thiruvananthapuram	Neyyattinkara	58,749	35,526	36,136	UDF	NDA	22,613

== See also ==
- 2024 Indian general election in Ladakh
- 2024 Indian general election in Lakshadweep
- 2024 Indian general election in Tamil Nadu
