= 2019 Indian general election in Kerala =

Indian lower house election in Keralam

2019 Indian general election
- 23 April 2019

20 seats
- Turnout: 77.84% (▲3.95%)
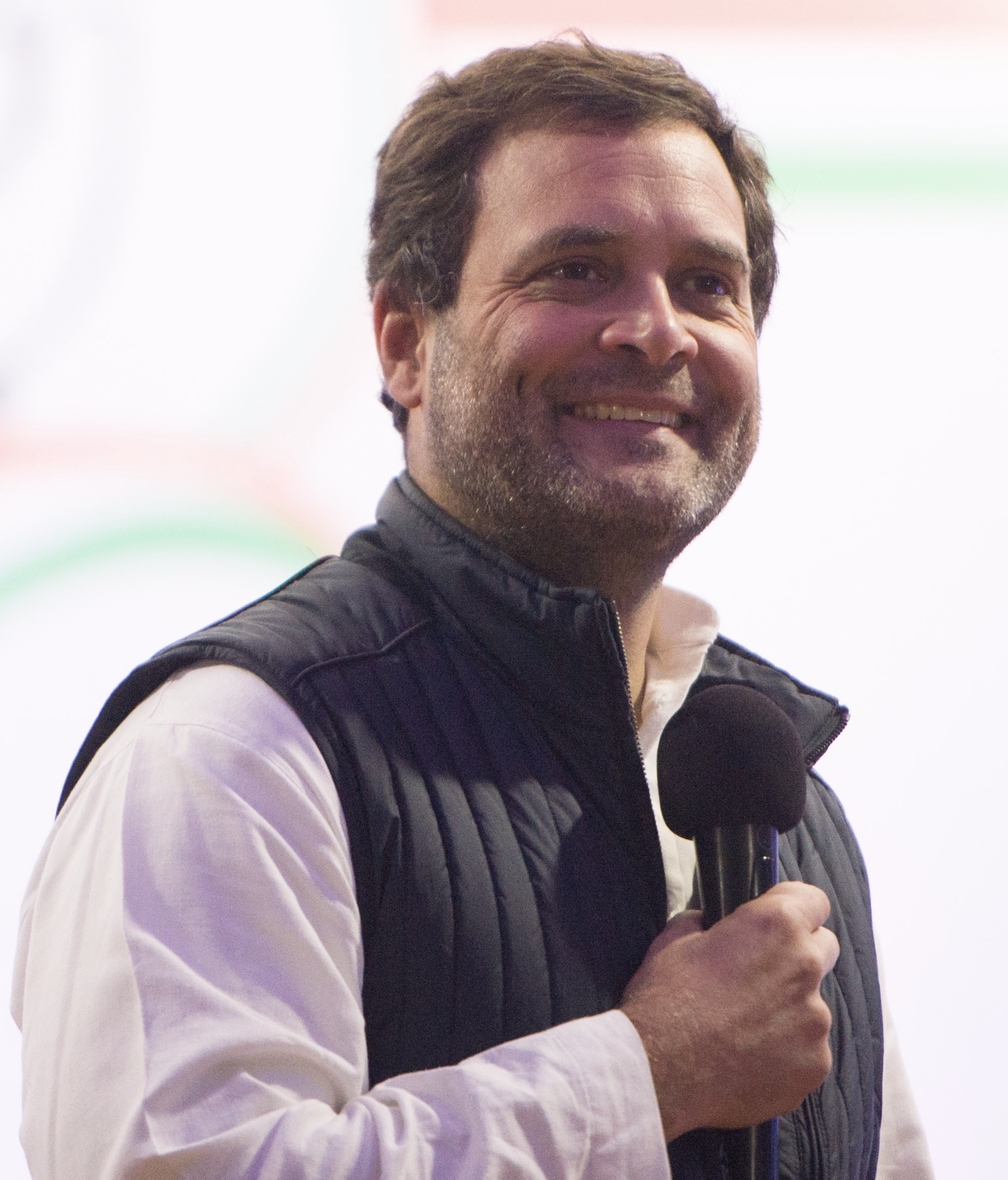

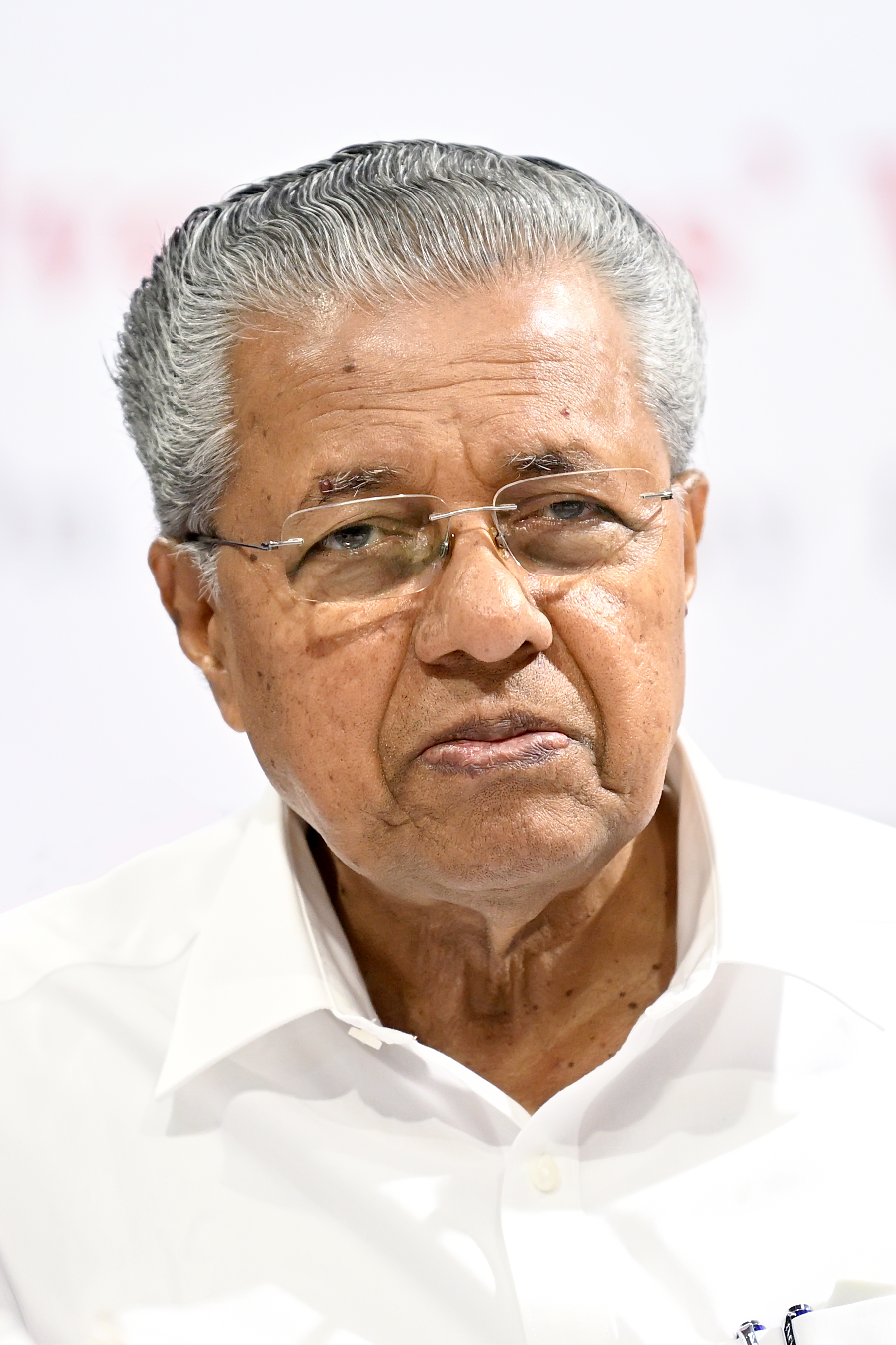

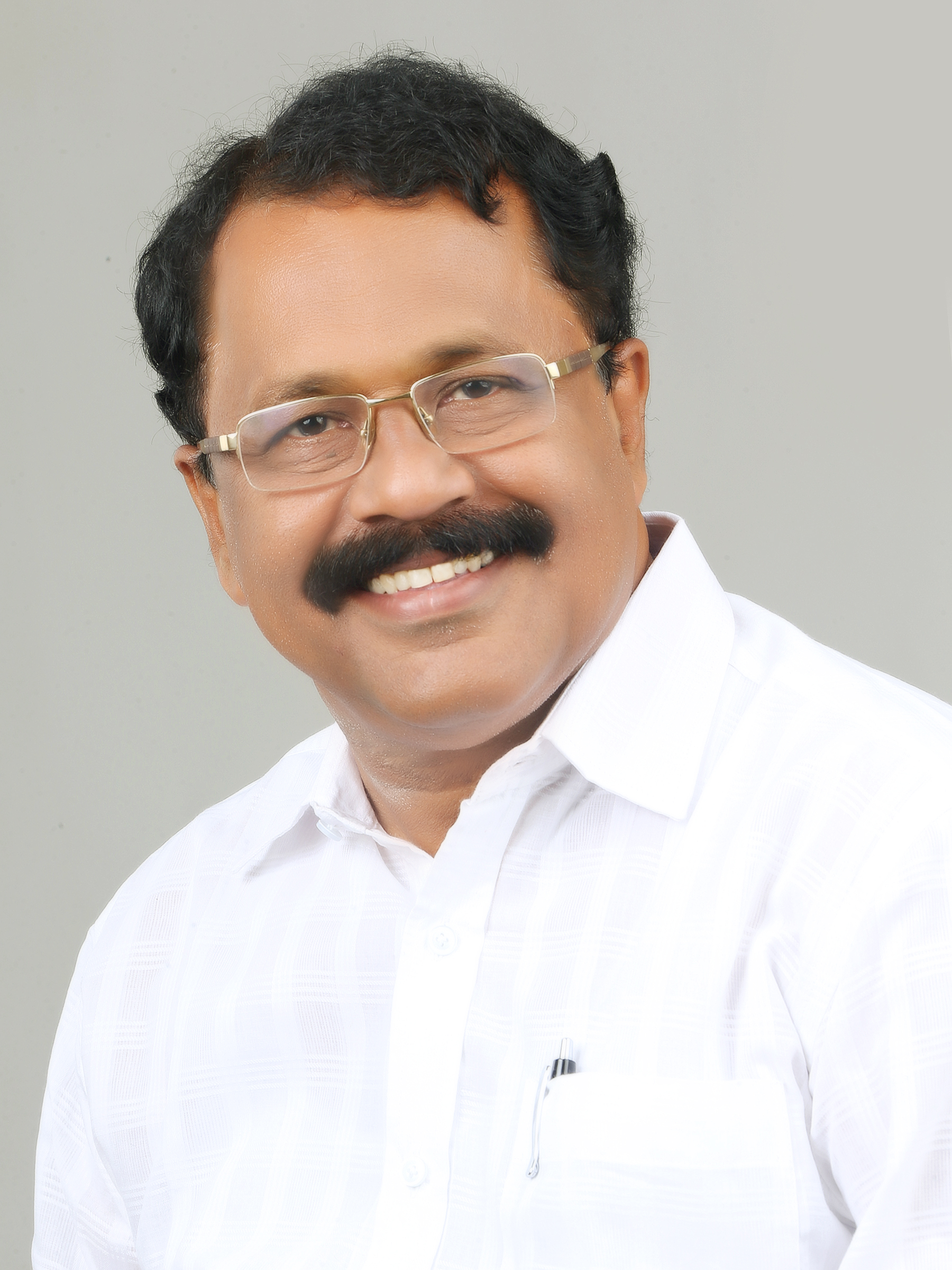
	First party	Second party	Third party
Leader	Rahul Gandhi	Pinarayi Vijayan	P. S. Sreedharan Pillai
Party	INC	CPI(M)	BJP
Alliance	UDF	LDF	NDA
Leader's seat	Wayanad	-	-
Last election	12	8	0
Seats won	19	1	0
Seat change	▲7	▼7	Steady
Percentage	47.48%	35.29%	15.64%
- Kerala
Prime Minister before election
Narendra Modi
BJP
Prime Minister after election
Narendra Modi
BJP

The 2019 Indian general election was held in Kerala on 23 April 2019 to constitute the 17th Lok Sabha.

Indian National Congress led United Democratic Front swept 19 out of 20 seats in the state winning more than 47% of total polled votes. Bharatiya Janata Party led National Democratic Alliance which formed government at center couldn't win any seats but gathered around 15% vote share. The ruling Left Democratic Front was decimated in the elections with just one seat, vote share dropped to 36% from 40% in 2014 general elections.

The state witnessed elections in the backdrop of Sabarimala Temple Protests, UDF’s PM candidate Rahul Gandhi contesting from state and NDA’s new alliance partner Bharath Dharma Jana Sena which is a political wing of the powerful SNDP. Even Demonetization and GST issues were discussed during election campaign though they were implemented years before the election. Both Sabarimala issue and BDJS’s partnership were expected to help NDA gain by huge margin, however final results favoured UDF due to shift of some of core voters of LDF to NDA through BDJS and more importantly presence of prime minister candidate Rahul Gandhi.

Despite no National Democratic Alliance winners from the state, it got one ministerial berth in Second Modi ministry through V. Muraleedharan a Member of Parliament, Rajya Sabha.

== Alliances and parties ==
The key alliances that fought for representation of Lok Sabha seats in Kerala are the UDF which is the Kerala state legislative alliance aligned with the UPA at the national level and the LDF comprising primarily the CPI(M) and the CPI. National Democratic Alliance (NDA), which had not won any seat in the state, placed candidates in all constituencies. A new force in the election is the Left United Front.

=== United Democratic Front ===
No.	Party	Election symbol	Seats contested
1.	Indian National Congress		16
2.	Indian Union Muslim League		2
3.	Kerala Congress (M)		1
4.	Revolutionary Socialist Party		1

=== Left Democratic Front ===
No.	Party	Election symbol	Seats contested
1.	Communist Party of India (Marxist)	Key	16 (Note: It includes two Independent candidates contesting on CPI(M) symbol)
2.	Communist Party of India	Star	4

=== National Democratic Alliance ===
No.	Party	Election symbol	Seats contested
1.	Bharatiya Janata Party		15
2.	Bharath Dharma Jana Sena		4
3.	Kerala Congress (Thomas)		1

=== Parties not in any Coalition ===
No.	Party	Election symbol	Seats contested
1.	Bahujan Samaj Party	frameles	16
2.	Social Democratic Party of India		10
3.	Socialist Unity Centre of India (Communist)		9
4.	Communist Party of India (Marxist-Leninist) Red Star		4
5.	Ambedkarite Party of India		3
6.	Peoples Democratic Party		2
7.	Secular Democratic Congress		2
8.	Marxist Communist Party of India (United)		1
9.	Pravasi Nivasi Party		1
10.	Indian Gandhiyan Party		1
11.	Rashtriya Samaj Paksha		1
12.	Viduthalai Chiruthaigal Katchi		1
13.	Samajwadi Forward Bloc Party		1
14.	National Labour Party		1
15.	Akhila India Makkal Kazhagam		1

Aam Admi Party, who had contested in the 2014 elections decided not to contest this election so as to not split anti-BJP votes.

== Opinion polls ==
=== Seat projections ===
Date published	Polling agency				Lead
Date published	Polling agency	UDF	LDF	NDA	Lead
Apr 2019	AZ Research – Asianet	13	6	1	7
Apr 2019	CSDS-Lokniti-Hindu	5–13	6–14	0–2	1–9
Apr 2019	AC Nielsen – Mathrubhumi	14	5	1	9
Apr 2019	Times Now – VMR	17	2	1	15
Apr 2019	CVoter	17	3	0	14
Apr 2019	Manorama – Karvy	13–15	4–5	0–1	9–12
Mar 2019	CVoter – IANS	17	2	1	12
Feb 2019	AZ Research – Asianet	14–16	4–6	0	10–13
Jan 2019	Spick Media	13	5	2	9
Jan 2019	CVoter	16	4	0	16
Oct 2018	ABP News – CSDS	16	4	0	13
Sep 2018	Spick Media	12	7	1	16

=== Vote percentage predictions ===
Date published	Polling agency				Lead
Date published	Polling agency	UDF	LDF	NDA	Lead
Apr 2019	CSDS-Lokniti-Hindu	34%	38%	18%	4%
Apr 2019	A C Nielsen – Mathrubhumi	41%	37%	16%	4%
Apr 2019	Times Now – VMR	46.97%	28.11%	20.85%	18.86%
Apr 2019	CVoter	40.7%	23.3%	23.2%	17.4%
Apr 2019	Manorama – Karvy	43%	38%	13%	5%
Jan 2019	CVoter	42.4%	37.4%	15.3%	10.8%
May 2019	Axis My India	48%	36%	13%	12%

=== Constituency predictions ===
	Manorama – Karvy			Mathrubhumi – AC Nielsen			AZ Research – Asianet		
Constituencies									
Constituencies	UDF	LDF	NDA	UDF	LDF	NDA	UDF	LDF	NDA
Kasaragod	43%	35%	19%	43%	35%	21%	33%	34%	17%
Kannur	49%	38%	9%	47%	44%	5%	39%	38%	17%
Vatakara	43%	44%	8%	41%	43%	12%	45%	38%	13%
Wayanad	43%	38%	9%	42%	34%	13%	45%	39%	16%
Kozhikode	42%	38%	14%	39%	42%	14%	44%	36%	16%
Malappuram	44%	36%	10%	48%	39%	8%	52%	29%	15%
Ponnani	55%	22%	15%	45%	39%	10%	46%	36%	16%
Palakkad	27%	51%	17%	30%	34%	31%	35%	37%	28%
Alathur (SC)	45%	38%	13%	37%	44%	16%	39%	41%	17%
Thrissur	41%	37%	16%	39%	36%	16%	36%	32%	26%
Chalakudy	40%	39%	13%	39%	37%	14%	36%	38%	19%
Ernakulam	41%	33%	11%	45%	34%	15%	43%	32%	20%
Idukki	44%	39%	9%	42%	36%	16%	37%	38%	14%
Kottayam	49%	39%	2%	47%	36%	9%	50%	31%	14%
Alappuzha	44%	47%	4%	47%	35%	9%	45%	37%	13%
Mavelikkara (SC)	45%	44%	8%	44%	35%	18%	46%	33%	18%
Pathanamthitta	42%	33%	21%	32%	29%	31%	36%	20%	35%
Kollam	48%	41%	7%	47%	39%	8%	44%	32%	16%
Attingal	38%	44%	13%	38%	46%	10%	35%	36%	17%
Thiruvananthapuram	35%	25%	36%	33%	23%	40%	34%	25%	40%

== Constituency candidates ==
Constituency		UPA		Left Front		NDA	
#	Name	Party	Candidate	Party	Candidate	Party	Candidate
1	Kasaragod	INC	Rajmohan Unnithan	CPM	K. P. Satheesh Chandran	BJP	Raveesh Thanthri Kuntar
2	Kannur	INC	K. Sudhakaran	CPM	P. K. Sreemathy	BJP	C. K. Padmanabhan
3	Vatakara	INC	K. Muraleedharan	CPM	P. Jayarajan	BJP	V. K. Sajeevan
4	Wayanad	INC	Rahul Gandhi	CPI	P. P. Suneer	BDJS	Thushar Vellapally
5	Kozhikode	INC	M. K. Raghavan	CPM	A. Pradeepkumar	BJP	K. P. Prakash Babu
6	Malappuram	IUML	P. K. Kunhalikutty	CPM	V. P. Sanu	BJP	Unnikrishnan Master
7	Ponnani	IUML	E. T. Mohammed Basheer	IND	P. V. Anvar	BJP	V. T. Rema
8	Palakkad	INC	V. K. Sreekandan	CPM	M. B. Rajesh	BJP	C. Krishnakumar
9	Alathur (SC)	INC	Remya Haridas	CPM	P. K. Biju	BDJS	T. V. Babu
10	Thrissur	INC	T. N. Prathapan	CPI	Rajaji Mathew Thomas	BJP	Suresh Gopi
11	Chalakudy	INC	Benny Behanan	CPM	Innocent	BJP	A. N. Radhakrishnan
12	Ernakulam	INC	Hibi Eden	CPM	P. Rajeev	BJP	Alphons Kannanthanam
13	Idukki	INC	Dean Kuriakose	IND	Joice George	BDJS	Biju Krishnan
14	Kottayam	KC(M)	Thomas Chazhikadan	CPM	V. N. Vasavan	KC(T)	P. C. Thomas
15	Alappuzha	INC	Shanimol Usman	CPM	A. M. Ariff	BJP	K. S. Radhakrishnan
16	Mavelikkara (SC)	INC	Kodikunnil Suresh	CPI	Chittayam Gopakumar	BDJS	Thazhava Sahadevan
17	Pathanamthitta	INC	Anto Antony	CPM	Veena George	BJP	K. Surendran
18	Kollam	RSP	N. K. Premachandran	CPM	K. N. Balagopal	BJP	K. V. Sabu
19	Attingal	INC	Adoor Prakash	CPM	A. Sampath	BJP	Shobha Surendran
20	Thiruvananthapuram	INC	Shashi Tharoor	CPI	C. Divakaran	BJP	K. Rajasekharan

== Voter turnout ==
Constituency no.	Constituency	Electors	Total Votes	% Voter Turnout					
Constituency no.	Constituency	Electors	Total Votes	% Voter Turnout	1	Kasaragod	1,363,937	1,100,099	80.6%
2	Kannur	1266550	1054746	83.2%					
3	Vadakara	1288926	1065932	82.6%					
4	Wayanad	1359679	1092759	80.3%					
5	Kozhikode	1318024	1076882	81.7%					
6	Malappuram	1370544	1034799	75.5%					
7	Ponnani	1356803	1017366	74.9%					
8	Palakkad	1323010	1028874	77.7%					
9	Alathur	1266794	1019376	80.4%					
10	Thrissur	1337110	1042122	77.9%					
11	Chalakudy	1230197	990433	80.5%					
12	Ernakulam	1245972	967390	77.6%					
13	Idukki	1204191	919559	76.3%					
14	Kottayam	1206698	910648	75.4%					
15	Alappuzha	1356701	1090112	80.3%					
16	Mavelikkara	1308102	972360	74.3%					
17	Pathanamthitta	1382741	1027378	74.3%					
18	Kollam	1296720	969017	74.7%					
19	Attingal	1350710	1006048	74.4%					
20	Thiruvananthapuram	1371427	1011268	73.7%					

== Bogus votes detection and re-polling ==
The Election Commission of India ordered re-polling on 19 May 2019 in 3 booths in Kasaragod and one in Kannur constituencies after confirming bogus votes.

== Results ==
=== Results by alliance or party ===
Vote Share (By alliance)
1. UDF (47.5%)
2. LDF (35.3%)
3. NDA (15.6%)
4. Others (1.59%)

Alliance/Party		Popular vote			Seats		
Alliance/Party		Votes	%	±pp	Contested	Won	+/−
UDF	INC	7,596,610	37.46%	▲6.36%	16	15	▼7
UDF	IUML	1,111,697	5.48%	▲0.94%	2	2	Steady
UDF	RSP	499,677	2.46%	▲0.19%	1	1	Steady
UDF	KEC(M)	421,046	2.08%	▼0.28%	1	1	Steady
UDF	Total	9,629,030	47.48 %	▲5.50%	20	19	▼5
LDF	CPI(M)	5,266,510	25.97%	▲4.38%	14	1	▼4
LDF	CPI	1,233,886	6.08%	▼1.51%	4	0	▼1
LDF	LDF Ind.	655,991	4.24%	▼5.01%	2	0	▼2
LDF	Total	7,156,387	35.29%	▼4.83%	20	1	▲8
NDA	BJP	2,635,810	13.00%	▼2.67%	15	0	Steady
NDA	BDJS	380,847	1.88%	New	4	0	Steady
NDA	KC (T)	155,135	0.76%	New	1	0	Steady
NDA	Total	3,171,792	15.64%	▲4.82%	20	0	Steady
Others		324,125	1.59%				
Total		20,397,168	100%	▲3.95%		20	

=== Constituency results ===
Constituency		Winner				Runner Up				Margin	%
#	Name	Candidate	Party	Votes	%	Candidate	Party	Votes	%	Margin	%
1	Kasaragod	Rajmohan Unnithan	INC	4,74,961	43.17	K. P. Sathishchandran	CPI(M)	4,34,523	39.50	40,438	3.67
2	Kannur	K. Sudhakaran	INC	5,29,741	50.22	P. K. Sreemathi Teacher	CPI(M)	4,35,182	41.26	94,559	8.96
3	Vadakara	K. Muraleedharan	INC	5,26,755	49.42	P. Jayarajan	CPI(M)	4,42,092	41.47	84,663	7.95
4	Wayanad	Rahul Gandhi	INC	7,06,367	64.64	P. P. Suneer	CPI	2,74,597	25.13	4,31,770	39.51
5	Kozhikode	M. K. Raghavan	INC	4,93,444	45.82	A. Pradeep Kumar	CPI(M)	4,08,219	37.91	85,225	7.91
6	Malappuram	P. K. Kunhalikutty	IUML	5,89,873	57.00	V. P. Sanu	CPI(M)	3,29,720	31.86	2,60,153	25.14
7	Ponnani	E. T. Mohammed Basheer	IUML	5,21,824	51.29	P. V. Anvar Puthan Veetil	IND	3,28,551	32.29	1,93,273	19.00
8	Palakkad	V. K. Sreekandan	INC	3,99,274	38.81	M. B. Rajesh	CPI(M)	3,87,637	37.68	11,637	1.13
9	Alathur	Ramya Haridas	INC	5,33,815	52.37	Dr. P. K. Biju	CPI(M)	3,74,847	36.77	1,58,968	15.60
10	Thrissur	T. N. Prathapan	INC	4,15,089	39.83	Rajaji Mathew Thomas	CPI	3,21,456	30.85	93,633	8.98
11	Chalakudy	Benny Behanan	INC	4,73,444	47.80	Innocent	CPI(M)	3,41,170	34.45	1,32,274	13.35
12	Ernakulam	Hibi Eden	INC	4,91,263	50.78	P. Rajeev	CPI(M)	3,22,110	33.30	1,69,153	17.48
13	Idukki	Adv. Dean Kuriakose	INC	4,98,493	54.21	Adv. Joice George	IND	3,27,440	35.61	1,71,053	18.60
14	Kottayam	Thomas Chazhikadan	KEC(M)	4,21,046	46.24	V. N. Vasavan	CPI(M)	3,14,787	34.57	1,06,259	11.67
15	Alappuzha	Adv. A. M. Ariff	CPI(M)	4,45,970	40.91	Adv. Shanimol Osman	INC	4,35,496	39.95	10,474	0.96
16	Mavelikkara	Kodikunnil Suresh	INC	4,40,415	45.29	Chittayam Gopakumar	CPI	3,79,277	39.01	61,138	6.28
17	Pathanamthitta	Anto Antony	INC	3,80,927	37.08	Veena George	CPI(M)	3,36,684	32.77	44,243	4.31
18	Kollam	N. K. Premachandran	RSP	4,99,677	51.57	K. N. Balagopal	CPI(M)	3,50,821	36.20	1,48,856	15.37
19	Attingal	Adv. Adoor Prakash	INC	3,80,995	37.87	Dr. A. Sampath	CPI(M)	3,42,748	34.07	38,247	3.80
20	Thiruvananthapuram	Dr. Shashi Tharoor	INC	4,16,131	41.15	Kummanam Rajasekharan	BJP	3,16,142	31.26	99,989	9.89

=== Alliance votes by constituency ===
No.	Constituency	UDF Votes	LDF Votes	NDA Votes
1	Kasaragod	4,74,961	4,34,523	1,76,049
2	Kannur	5,29,741	4,35,182	68,509
3	Vatakara	5,26,755	4,42,092	80,128
4	Wayanad	7,06,367	2,74,597	78,816
5	Kozhikode	4,93,444	4,08,219	1,61,216
6	Malappuram	5,89,873	3,29,720	82,332
7	Ponnani	5,21,824	3,28,551	1,10,603
8	Palakkad	3,99,274	3,87,637	2,18,556
9	Alathur (SC)	5,33,815	3,74,847	89,837
10	Thrissur	4,15,089	3,21,456	2,93,822
11	Chalakudy	4,73,444	3,41,170	1,54,159
12	Ernakulam	4,91,263	3,22,110	1,37,749
13	Idukki	4,98,493	3,27,440	78,648
14	Kottayam	4,21,046	3,14,787	1,55,135
15	Alappuzha	4,35,496	4,45,970	1,87,729
16	Mavelikkara (SC)	4,40,415	3,79,277	1,33,546
17	Pathanamthitta	3,80,927	3,36,684	2,97,396
18	Kollam	4,99,677	3,50,821	1,03,339
19	Attingal	3,80,995	3,42,748	2,48,081
20	Thiruvananthapuram	4,16,151	2,58,556	3,16,142

== Party votes by assembly segment ==
=== Results ===
Party	Votes secured	Percentage of total votes (in %)	Assembly segments	Position in Assembly (as of 2021 election)
Indian National Congress	75,96,610	37.46	96	21
Communist Party of India (Marxist)	52,66,510	25.97	16	62
Indian Union Muslim League	11,11,697	5.48	14	15
Kerala Congress (M)	4,21,046	2.08	6	5
Revolutionary Socialist Party	4,99,677	2.46	7	–
Bharatiya Janata Party	26,35,810	13.00	1	0
Communist Party of India	12,33,886	6.08	–	17
Bharath Dharma Jana Sena	3,80,847	1.88	–	–
Kerala Congress (Thomas)	1,55,135	0.76	–	–
Others	–	11	–	20
Total			140	

=== Votes by State Legislative Assembly constituencies ===
According to the ECI, the details of the valid votes polled in the state legislative assembly constituencies of Kerala are as follows:

Alliance	assembly segments.
UDF	123
LDF	16
NDA	1
Total assembly lead out of 140.

Alliance	assembly segments
UDF	16
LDF	117
NDA	7
Second position in the assembly segments (out of 140).

No.	Constituency	Assembly Segment	UDF	LDF	NDA	Lead	Runner-up	Margin
1	Kasaragod	Manjeshwaram	68217	32796	57104	UDF	NDA	11113
2	Kasaragod	Kasaragod	69790	28567	46630	UDF	NDA	23160
3	Kasaragod	Udma	72324	63387	23786	UDF	LDF	8937
4	Kasaragod	Kanhangad	72570	74791	20046	LDF	UDF	2221
5	Kasaragod	Thrikaripur	74504	76403	8652	LDF	UDF	1899
6	Kasaragod	Payyanur	56730	82861	9268	LDF	UDF	26131
7	Kasaragod	Kalliasseri	59848	73542	9854	LDF	UDF	13694
8	Kannur	Taliparamba	81444	80719	8659	UDF	LDF	725
9	Kannur	Irikkur	90221	52901	7289	UDF	LDF	37320
10	Kannur	Azhikode	73075	51218	11728	UDF	LDF	21857
11	Kannur	Kannur	70683	47260	9740	UDF	LDF	23423
12	Kannur	Dharmadom	70631	74730	8538	LDF	UDF	4099
13	Kannur	Mattanur	67092	74580	11612	LDF	UDF	7488
14	Kannur	Peravoor	74539	50874	10054	UDF	LDF	23665
15	Vatakara	Thalassery	53932	65401	13456	LDF	UDF	11469
16	Vatakara	Kuthuparamba	68492	64359	15303	UDF	LDF	4133
17	Vatakara	Vatakara	71162	48199	9469	UDF	LDF	22963
18	Vatakara	Kuttiadi	83628	65736	7851	UDF	LDF	17892
19	Vatakara	Nadapuram	87061	69465	8408	UDF	LDF	17596
20	Vatakara	Koyilandy	79800	58755	16588	UDF	LDF	21045
21	Vatakara	Perambra	80929	67725	8505	UDF	LDF	13204
22	Wayanad	Mananthavady	93237	38606	13916	UDF	LDF	54631
23	Wayanad	Sulthan Bathery	110697	40232	17602	UDF	LDF	70465
24	Wayanad	Kalpetta	101229	37475	14122	UDF	LDF	63754
25	Wayanad	Thiruvambady	91152	36681	7767	UDF	LDF	54471
26	Wayanad	Eranad	92909	36382	6133	UDF	LDF	56527
27	Wayanad	Nilambur	103862	42202	10749	UDF	LDF	61660
28	Wayanad	Wandoor	111948	42393	8301	UDF	LDF	69555
29	Kozhikode	Balussery	83059	73314	18836	UDF	LDF	9745
30	Kozhikode	Elathur	67280	67177	24649	UDF	LDF	103
31	Kozhikode	Kozhikode North	54246	49688	28665	UDF	LDF	4558
32	Kozhikode	Kozhikode South	54608	40877	20173	UDF	LDF	13731
33	Kozhikode	Beypore	69402	58979	25697	UDF	LDF	10423
34	Kozhikode	Kunnamangalam	81551	70259	30650	UDF	LDF	11292
35	Kozhikode	Koduvally	81689	45781	11682	UDF	LDF	35908
36	Malappuram	Kondotty	87561	48248	13832	UDF	LDF	39313
37	Malappuram	Manjeri	85579	49531	11595	UDF	LDF	36048
38	Malappuram	Perinthalmanna	79867	56829	9851	UDF	LDF	23038
39	Malappuram	Mankada	85193	49928	10160	UDF	LDF	35265
40	Malappuram	Malappuram	94704	49728	7343	UDF	LDF	44976
41	Malappuram	Vengara	82388	30500	7504	UDF	LDF	51888
42	Malappuram	Vallikunnu	73861	44339	21802	UDF	LDF	29522
43	Ponnani	Tirurangadi	85428	38444	10663	UDF	LDF	46984
44	Ponnani	Tanur	75210	43044	14791	UDF	LDF	32166
45	Ponnani	Tirur	90734	49349	11365	UDF	LDF	41385
46	Ponnani	Kottakkal	87795	45596	13506	UDF	LDF	42199
47	Ponnani	Thavanur	62481	50128	20769	UDF	LDF	12353
48	Ponnani	Ponnani	61294	51555	17498	UDF	LDF	9739
49	Ponnani	Thrithala	58496	50092	21838	UDF	LDF	8404
50	Palakkad	Pattambi	67644	50465	20716	UDF	LDF	17179
51	Palakkad	Shornur	49810	60902	32308	LDF	UDF	11092
52	Palakkad	Ottapalam	54386	60846	35683	LDF	UDF	6460
53	Palakkad	Kongad	52456	52812	29104	LDF	UDF	356
54	Palakkad	Mannarkkad	78250	48625	18560	UDF	LDF	29625
55	Palakkad	Malampuzha	47743	69037	41413	LDF	UDF	21294
56	Palakkad	Palakkad	48425	44086	39963	UDF	LDF	4339
57	Alathur	Tarur	72441	47602	8601	UDF	LDF	24839
58	Alathur	Chittur	79423	55956	9885	UDF	LDF	23467
59	Alathur	Nenmara	82539	52318	12345	UDF	LDF	30221
60	Alathur	Alathur	73120	50407	6959	UDF	LDF	22713
61	Alathur	Chelakkara	76034	52339	17133	UDF	LDF	23695
62	Alathur	Kunnamkulam	69908	55586	17228	UDF	LDF	14322
63	Alathur	Wadakkanchery	79028	59488	17424	UDF	LDF	19540
64	Thrissur	Guruvayur	65160	44695	33967	UDF	LDF	20465
65	Thrissur	Manalur	63420	50482	44765	UDF	LDF	12938
66	Thrissur	Ollur	63406	47372	39594	UDF	LDF	16034
67	Thrissur	Thrissur	55668	31110	37641	UDF	NDA	18027
68	Thrissur	Nattika	52558	50131	48171	UDF	LDF	2427
69	Thrissur	Irinjalakuda	57481	46091	42857	UDF	LDF	11390
70	Thrissur	Puthukkad	56848	51006	46410	UDF	LDF	5842
71	Chalakudy	Kaipamangalam	51212	51154	24420	UDF	LDF	58
72	Chalakudy	Chalakudy	69536	48827	23433	UDF	LDF	20709
73	Chalakudy	Kodungallur	61085	49355	29732	UDF	LDF	11730
74	Chalakudy	Perumbavoor	69526	46903	22954	UDF	LDF	22623
75	Chalakudy	Angamaly	72496	44696	13863	UDF	LDF	27800
76	Chalakudy	Aluva	76318	44215	21951	UDF	LDF	32103
77	Chalakudy	Kunnathunad	72762	55431	17581	UDF	LDF	17331
78	Ernakulam	Kalamassery	73745	53056	21026	UDF	LDF	20689
79	Ernakulam	Paravur	71025	56940	23035	UDF	LDF	14085
80	Ernakulam	Vypen	68047	44806	14940	UDF	LDF	23241
81	Ernakulam	Kochi	71270	41957	14747	UDF	LDF	29313
82	Ernakulam	Thrippunithura	71631	52404	25304	UDF	LDF	19227
83	Ernakulam	Ernakulam	61920	30742	17769	UDF	LDF	31178
84	Ernakulam	Thrikkakara	73216	41439	20710	UDF	LDF	31777
85	Idukki	Muvattupuzha	78799	46260	12867	UDF	LDF	32539
86	Idukki	Kothamangalam	67942	47346	12092	UDF	LDF	20596
87	Idukki	Devikulam	66748	42712	7498	UDF	LDF	24036
88	Idukki	Udumbanchola	63550	51056	10863	UDF	LDF	12494
89	Idukki	Thodupuzha	79342	42319	15223	UDF	LDF	37023
90	Idukki	Idukki	71218	50290	10891	UDF	LDF	20928
91	Idukki	Peerumade	70098	46718	9070	UDF	LDF	23380
92	Kottayam	Piravom	66192	57088	22772	UDF	LDF	9104
93	Kottayam	Pala	66971	33499	26533	UDF	LDF	33472
94	Kottayam	Kaduthuruthy	65877	39170	20895	UDF	LDF	26707
95	Kottayam	Vaikom	47256	56476	21871	LDF	UDF	9220
96	Kottayam	Ettumanoor	55356	46911	20112	UDF	LDF	8445
97	Kottayam	Kottayam	54831	40864	21564	UDF	LDF	13967
98	Kottayam	Puthuppally	63811	39484	20911	UDF	LDF	24327
99	Alappuzha	Aroor	65656	65008	25250	UDF	LDF	648
100	Alappuzha	Cherthala	66326	83221	22655	LDF	UDF	16895
101	Alappuzha	Alappuzha	65828	65759	21303	UDF	LDF	69
102	Alappuzha	Ambalappuzha	53159	52521	25061	UDF	LDF	638
103	Alappuzha	Haripad	61445	55601	26238	UDF	LDF	5844
104	Alappuzha	Kayamkulam	58073	62370	31660	LDF	UDF	4297
105	Alappuzha	Karunagappally	63303	58523	34111	UDF	LDF	4780
106	Mavelikara	Changanassery	64368	40958	13884	UDF	LDF	23410
107	Mavelikara	Kuttanad	55253	52630	14476	UDF	LDF	2623
108	Mavelikara	Mavelikara	60392	59423	23387	UDF	LDF	969
109	Mavelikara	Chengannur	61242	51403	24854	UDF	LDF	9839
110	Mavelikara	Kunnathur	69500	62327	21136	UDF	LDF	7173
111	Mavelikara	Kottarakkara	62998	60244	19091	UDF	LDF	2754
112	Mavelikara	Pathanapuram	64244	49512	15495	UDF	LDF	14732
113	Pathanamthitta	Kanjirappally	55330	45587	36628	UDF	LDF	9743
114	Pathanamthitta	Poonjar	61530	43601	30990	UDF	LDF	17929
115	Pathanamthitta	Thiruvalla	54250	50511	40186	UDF	LDF	3739
116	Pathanamthitta	Ranni	50755	42931	39560	UDF	LDF	7824
117	Pathanamthitta	Aranmula	59277	52684	50497	UDF	LDF	6593
118	Pathanamthitta	Konni	49667	46946	46506	UDF	LDF	2721
119	Pathanamthitta	Adoor	49280	53216	51260	LDF	NDA	1956
120	Kollam	Chavara	74562	46994	11655	UDF	LDF	27568
121	Kollam	Punalur	73622	54956	16168	UDF	LDF	18666
122	Kollam	Chadayamangalam	70387	56155	15820	UDF	LDF	14232
123	Kollam	Kundara	79217	54908	14696	UDF	LDF	24309
124	Kollam	Kollam	68748	44203	12871	UDF	LDF	24545
125	Kollam	Eravipuram	67582	44162	11488	UDF	LDF	23420
126	Kollam	Chathannoor	63146	46114	19621	UDF	LDF	17032
127	Attingal	Varkala	48019	42335	34343	UDF	LDF	5684
128	Attingal	Attingal	50045	48492	42389	UDF	LDF	1553
129	Attingal	Chirayinkeezhu	56314	47750	32829	UDF	LDF	8564
130	Attingal	Nedumangad	54506	55265	36417	LDF	UDF	759
131	Attingal	Vamanapuram	59671	50231	29681	UDF	LDF	9440
132	Attingal	Aruvikkara	58952	50403	30151	UDF	LDF	8549
133	Attingal	Kattakkada	51962	45822	40692	UDF	LDF	6140
134	Thiruvananthapuram	Kazhakkoottam	46964	37688	45479	UDF	NDA	1485
135	Thiruvananthapuram	Vattiyoorkavu	53545	29414	50709	UDF	NDA	2836
136	Thiruvananthapuram	Thiruvananthapuram	57077	27530	42877	UDF	NDA	14200
137	Thiruvananthapuram	Nemom	46472	33921	58513	NDA	UDF	12041
138	Thiruvananthapuram	Parassala	69944	47942	42887	UDF	LDF	22002
139	Thiruvananthapuram	Kovalam	73221	42050	41092	UDF	LDF	31171
140	Thiruvananthapuram	Neyyattinkara	66834	37925	32368	UDF	LDF	28909

== See also ==
- Elections in Kerala
- Politics of Kerala
- 2020 Kerala local body elections
