= Kottayam Lok Sabha constituency =

Constituency of the Indian parliament in Kerala

Coordinates: 9.60°N 76.52°E

Kottayam KL-14
- Lok Sabha constituency
- Kottayam Lok Sabha constituency

Constituency details
- Country: India
- Region: South India
- State: Kerala
- Assembly constituencies: Piravom; Pala; Kaduthuruthy; Vaikom; Ettumanoor; Kottayam; Puthuppally
- Established: 1952
- Reservation: None

Member of Parliament
- 18th Lok Sabha
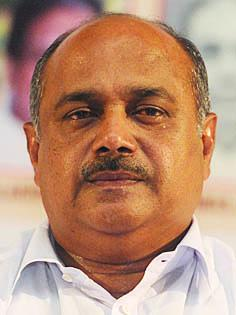
- Incumbent K. Francis George
- Party: KEC
- Alliance: UDF
- Elected year: 2024
- Preceded by: Thomas Chazhikadan

Kottayam Lok Sabha constituency is one of the 20 Lok Sabha (parliamentary) constituencies in Kerala state in southern India.

== Assembly segments ==
Kottayam Lok Sabha constituency is composed of the following assembly segments:

No	Name	District	Member	Party	2024 Lead
85	Piravom	Ernakulam	Anoop Jacob	KC(J)	KEC
93	Pala	Kottayam	Mani C. Kappan	DCK	KEC
94	Kaduthuruthy	Kottayam	Monce Joseph	KEC	KEC
95	Vaikom (SC)	Kottayam	K. Binimon	INC	KC(M)
96	Ettumanoor	Kottayam	Nattakom Suresh	INC	KEC
97	Kottayam	Kottayam	Thiruvanchoor Radhakrishnan	INC	KEC
98	Puthuppally	Kottayam	Chandy Oommen	INC	KEC

Former constituencies

- 88. Vazhoor
- 89. Changanassery
- 90. Kottayam
- 91. Ettumanoor
- 92. Puthuppally
- 95. Kaduthuruthy
- 96. Vaikom

== Members of Parliament ==
Election	Lok Sabha	Member	Party	Tenure
Travancore-Cochin
1952	1st	C. P. Mathew	Indian National Congress	1952 – 1957
After the Formation of Kerala
1957	2nd	Mathew Maniyangadan	Indian National Congress	1957 – 1962
1962	3rd	Mathew Maniyangadan	Indian National Congress	1962 – 1967
1967	4th	K. M. Abraham	Communist Party of India	1967 – 1971
1971	5th	Varkey George	Kerala Congress	1971 – 1977
1977	6th	Skariah Thomas	Kerala Congress	1977 – 1980
1980	7th	Skariah Thomas	Kerala Congress	1980 – 1984
1984	8th	K.Suresh Kurup	Communist Party of India (Marxist)	1984 – 1989
1989	9th	Ramesh Chennithala	Indian National Congress	1989 – 1991
1991	10th	Ramesh Chennithala	Indian National Congress	1991 – 1996
1996	11th	Ramesh Chennithala	Indian National Congress	1996 – 1998
1998	12th	K.Suresh Kurup	Communist Party of India (Marxist)	1998 – 1999
1999	13th	K.Suresh Kurup	Communist Party of India (Marxist)	1999 – 2004
2004	14th	K.Suresh Kurup	Communist Party of India (Marxist)	2004 - 2009
2009	15th	Jose K. Mani	Kerala Congress (Mani)	2009 – 2014
2014	16th	Jose K. Mani	Kerala Congress (Mani)	2014 – 2018
2019	17th	Thomas Chazhikadan	Kerala Congress (Mani)	2019–2024
2024	18th	K. Francis George	Kerala Congress	2024-Incumbent

== Election results ==
=== General Elections 2029 ===
2029 Indian general election: Kottayam
Party	Candidate	Votes	%	±%
UDF				
LDF				
NDA				
NOTA	None of the above			
Margin of victory				
Turnout				
		Swing		

=== General Election 2024 ===
2024 Indian general election: Kottayam
Party	Candidate	Votes	%	±%
KEC	K. Francis George	364,631	43.60	▲26.56
KC(M)	Thomas Chazhikadan	277,365	33.17	▼13.08
BDJS	Thushar Vellappally	165,046	19.74	New
NOTA	None of the above	11,933	1.43	
Margin of victory		87,266	10.43	−1.17
Turnout		837,890	66.70	−8.77
UDF hold		Swing		

By Assembly Segments
No.	Status (Assembly Constituency)	Votes			Lead
No.	Status (Assembly Constituency)	KEC (UDF)	KC(M) (LDF)	BDJS (NDA)	Lead
85	Piravom	61,586	45,931	21,777	15,655
93	Pala	52,295	39,830	22,505	12,465
94	Kaduthuruthy	51,830	40,356	20,889	11,474
95	Vaikom (SC)	40,066	45,262	27,515	5,196
96	Ettumanoor	46,871	37,261	24,412	9,610
97	Kottayam	46,644	31,804	24,214	14,840
98	Puthuppally	59,077	31,974	21,915	27,103

=== General election 2019 ===
2019 Indian general election: Kottayam
Party	Candidate	Votes	%	±%
KC(M)	Thomas Chazhikadan	421,046	46.25	−4.71
CPI(M)	V. N. Vasavan	314,787	34.58	
KEC	Adv. P. C. Thomas	154,658	17.04	
Margin of victory		106,259	11.66	−2.84
Turnout		910,648	75.47	+3.77
KC(M) hold		Swing	-4.71	

By Assembly Segments
No.	Status (Assembly Constituency)	Votes			Lead
No.	Status (Assembly Constituency)	KC(M) (UDF)	CPI(M) (LDF)	KC(T) (NDA)	Lead
85	Piravom	66,192	57,088	22,772	9,104
93	Pala	66,971	33,499	26,533	33,472
94	Kaduthuruthy	65,877	39,170	20,895	26,707
95	Vaikom (SC)	47,256	56,476	21,871	9,220
96	Ettumanoor	55,356	46,911	20,112	8,445
97	Kottayam	54,831	40,864	21,564	13,967
98	Puthuppally	63,811	39,484	20,911	24,327

Elected MP Thomas Chazhikadan switched to LDF alliance as he sided with Jose K Mani after the Split in Kerala Congress in 2020.

=== General election 2014 ===
2014 Indian general election: Kottayam
Party	Candidate	Votes	%	±%
KC(M)	Jose K. Mani	424,194	50.96	+0.83
JD(S)	Mathew T. Thomas	303,595	36.47	N/A
KEC(Nat.)	Noble Mathew	44,357	5.33	N/A
AAP	Adv. Anil Aickara	26,381	3.17	N/A
NOTA	None of the above	14,024	1.69	−−−
Margin of victory		120,599	14.50	−5.65
Turnout		831,636	71.70	
KC(M) hold		Swing		

By Assembly Segments
No.	Status (Assembly Constituency)	Votes			Lead
No.	Status (Assembly Constituency)	KC(M) (UDF)	JD(S) (LDF)	KC(N) (NDA)	Lead
85	Piravom	63,942	55,611	4,683	8,331
93	Pala	66,968	35,569	8,533	31,399
94	Kaduthuruthy	63,554	38,594	6,218	24,960
95	Vaikom (SC)	54,623	52,550	5,184	2,073
96	Ettumanoor	56,429	43,921	5,540	12,508
97	Kottayam	56,395	39,943	6,783	16,452
98	Puthuppally	61,552	36,793	7,372	24,759

=== General election 2009 ===
2009 Indian general election: Kottayam
Party	Candidate	Votes	%	±%
KC(M)	Jose K. Mani	404,962	50.13	+50.13
CPI(M)	K. Suresh Kurup	3,33,392	41.27	−7.07
BJP	Narayanan Namboothiri	37,422	4.63	−2.88
Margin of victory		71,570		
Turnout		8,07,820	73.75	
KC(M) gain from CPI(M)		Swing		

=== General election 2004 ===
2004 Indian general election: Kottayam
Party	Candidate	Votes	%	±%
CPI(M)	K. Suresh Kurup	3,41,213	48.34	+1.07
INC	Anto Antony	2,98,299	42.27	−3.55
BJP	B. Radhakrishna Menon	53,034	7.51	+1.81
Margin of victory		42,914		
Turnout		7,05,776		
CPI(M) hold		Swing		

=== General election 1999 ===
1999 Indian general election: Kottayam
Party	Candidate	Votes	%	±%
CPI(M)	K. Suresh Kurup	3,44,296	47.27	+0.29
INC	P. C. Chacko	3,33,697	45.82	−0.40
BJP	K. R. Surendran	41,531	5.70	−0.29
Margin of victory		10,599		
Turnout		7,33,725	72.05	
CPI(M) hold		Swing		

=== General election 1998 ===
1998 Indian general election: Kottayam
Party	Candidate	Votes	%	±%
CPI(M)	K. Suresh Kurup	3,35,893	46.98	−−−
INC	Ramesh Chennithala	3,30,447	46.22	−4.04
BJP	George Kurian	42,830	5.99	−−−
Margin of victory		5,446		
Turnout		7,19,864	73.26	
CPI(M) gain from INC		Swing		

=== General election 1996 ===
1996 Indian general election: Kottayam
Party	Candidate	Votes	%	±%
INC	Ramesh Chennithala	3,44,587	50.26	−1.72
JD	Jayalakshmi	2,77,539	40.48	−2.62
Independent	A. K. Achary	29,319	4.28	−−−
BSP	Paul Chirakarode	10,083	1.47	+0.65
Margin of victory		67,048		
Turnout		7,13,707	76.07	
INC hold		Swing		

=== General election 1991 ===
1991 Indian general election: Kottayam
Party	Candidate	Votes	%	±%
INC	Ramesh Chennithala	3,66,759	51.98	+0.63
JD	Thampan Thomas	3,04,137	43.10	−−−
BJP	George Kurian	22,622	3.21	+0.75
Margin of victory		62,622		
Turnout		7,01,660	72.46	
INC hold		Swing		

=== General election 1989 ===
1989 Indian general election: Kottayam
Party	Candidate	Votes	%	±%
INC	Ramesh Chennithala	3,84,809	51.35	
CPI(M)	K. Suresh Kurup	3,31,276	44.21	
BJP	Ettumanoor Radhakrishnan	18,449	2.46	
Margin of victory		53,533		
Turnout		7,52,839	84.57	
INC gain from CPI(M)		Swing		

== See also ==
- Kottayam district
- 2019 Indian general election
- Indian general election, 2019 (Kerala)
- List of constituencies of the Lok Sabha
