= K. Suresh Kurup =

Indian politician (born 1956)

Suresh Kurup
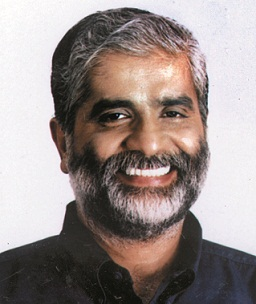

Member of the Kerala Legislative Assembly
- In office 1 June 2011 – 24 May 2021
- Preceded by: Thomas Chazhikadan
- Succeeded by: V. N. Vasavan
- Constituency: Ettumanoor

Member of Parliament, Lok Sabha
- In office 1998 – 2009
- Preceded by: Ramesh Chennithala
- Succeeded by: Jose K. Mani
- Constituency: Kottayam
- In office 1984 – 1989
- Preceded by: Skariah Thomas
- Succeeded by: Ramesh Chennithala
- Constituency: Kottayam

Personal details
- Born: 25 May 1956 (age 70) Kottayam, State of Travancore–Cochin (present day Kerala), India
- Party: Communist Party of India (Marxist)
- Spouse: Savithry Nampoothiri
- Children: 2
- Parents: Kunjan Pillai; Bharathy Amma
- Education: CMS College, Kottayam; NSS Hindu College, Changanassery; The Kerala Law Academy Law College, Thiruvananthapuram
- As of 3 August, 2009

Kunjan Pillai Suresh Kurup (born 25 May 1956) is an Indian politician and a member of the Communist Party of India (Marxist). He was a member of the Kerala Legislative Assembly representing Ettumanoor constituency from 1 June 2011 to 24 May 2021.

He was a member of the 8th, 12th, 13th and 14th Lok Sabha from Kottayam constituency of Kerala.

== Personal life ==
K. Suresh Kurup was born on 25 May 1956 as the son of Kunjan Pillai and Bharathy Amma at Kottayam in the erstwhile State of Travancore–Cochin.

He was educated at CMS College in Kottayam, NSS Hindu College, Changanassery and The Kerala Law Academy Law College, Thiruvananthapuram. He has B.A and LL.B degrees and has practised as a lawyer.

He is married to Savithry Nampoothiri and has two sons.

== Political career ==
Kurup was chairman of the Kerala University Students Union in 1978-1979 and president of the state branch of the Students Federation of India between 1982 and 1985.

In 1984, Kurup was elected to the 8th Lok Sabha. He was elected to the 12th Lok Sabha in 1998 and to the 13th Lok Sabha in 1999, as well as to the 14th Lok Sabha in 2004.

Kurup won the Ettumanoor constituency in the elections for the Legislative Assembly of Kerala in 2011 and 2016.

== Electoral History ==
=== Lok Sabha ===
Year	Constituency	Party	Votes	%	Opponent	Party	Votes	%	Result	Margin	%
1984	Kottayam	CPI(M)	264,444	47.49	Skaria Thomas	KEC	258,591	46.44	Won	▲5,853	▲1.05
1989	Kottayam	CPI(M)	331,276	44.21	Ramesh Chennithala	INC	384,809	51.35	Lost	▼53,533	▼7.14
1991	Mavelikara	CPI(M)	279,031	44.98	P. J. Kurian	INC	304,519	49.09	Lost	▼25,488	▼4.11
1998	Kottayam	CPI(M)	335,893	46.98	Ramesh Chennithala	INC	330,447	46.22	Won	▲5,446	▲0.76
1999	Kottayam	CPI(M)	344,296	47.27	P. C. Chacko	INC	333,697	45.82	Won	▲10,599	▲1.45
2004	Kottayam	CPI(M)	341,213	48.35	Anto Antony	INC	298,299	42.27	Won	▲42,914	▲6.08
2009	Kottayam	CPI(M)	333,392	41.27	Jose K. Mani	KC(M)	404,962	50.13	Lost	▼71,570	▼8.86

=== Assembly ===
Year	Constituency	Party	Votes	%	Opponent	Party	Votes	%	Result	Margin	%
2011	Ettumanoor	CPI(M)	57,381	48.52	Thomas Chazhikadan	KC(M)	55,580	47.00	Won	▲1,801	▲3.32
2016	Ettumanoor	CPI(M)	53,085	40.67	Thomas Chazhikadan	KC(M)	44,906	33.94	Won	▲8,899	▼
