= C. P. Mathew =

Indian politician (1896–1970)

Prof. C. P. Mathew

Member of Parliament for Kottayam
- In office 1952–1957
- Preceded by: Inaugural Holder
- Succeeded by: Mathew Maniyangadan

Personal details
- Born: 19 March 1896; Ayirure, Kingdom of Travancore
- Died: 24 September 1970 (aged 74)
- Political party: Indian National Congress
- Spouse: Aley Mathew

C. P. Mathew (19 March 1896 – 24 September 1970) was an Indian politician from Kerala and a leader of the Indian National Congress. He was elected to the Lok Sabha from Kottayam in 1952.

== Early life ==
C. P. Mathew was born on 19 March 1896 at Ayirure, Travancore. He was educated at Maharaja's College, St. Aloysius College and Madras Christian College. He married Shrimati Aley Mathew on 1 May 1924.

== Career ==
He was a professor of philosophy. He worked as a lecturer in Madras Christian College from 1918 to 1921. He was one of the founders of Union Christian College, Aluva in 1921 where he served during 1921—47 and later became principal from 1947 to 1952. He went on a lecturing tour of the United Kingdom in 1939, at the invitation of the British Conference of Missionary Societies. Mathew served on the Delegation to the UNESCO General Conference held in Paris in 1952 and Member of Delegation to the United Nations Assembly in 1954.

He maintained intimate association with the Union Christian College, where he served as principal from 1947 to 1952 until his death on 24 September 1970. The Mathew Block in the college is named after him.
