= Jose K. Mani =

Indian politician (born 1965)

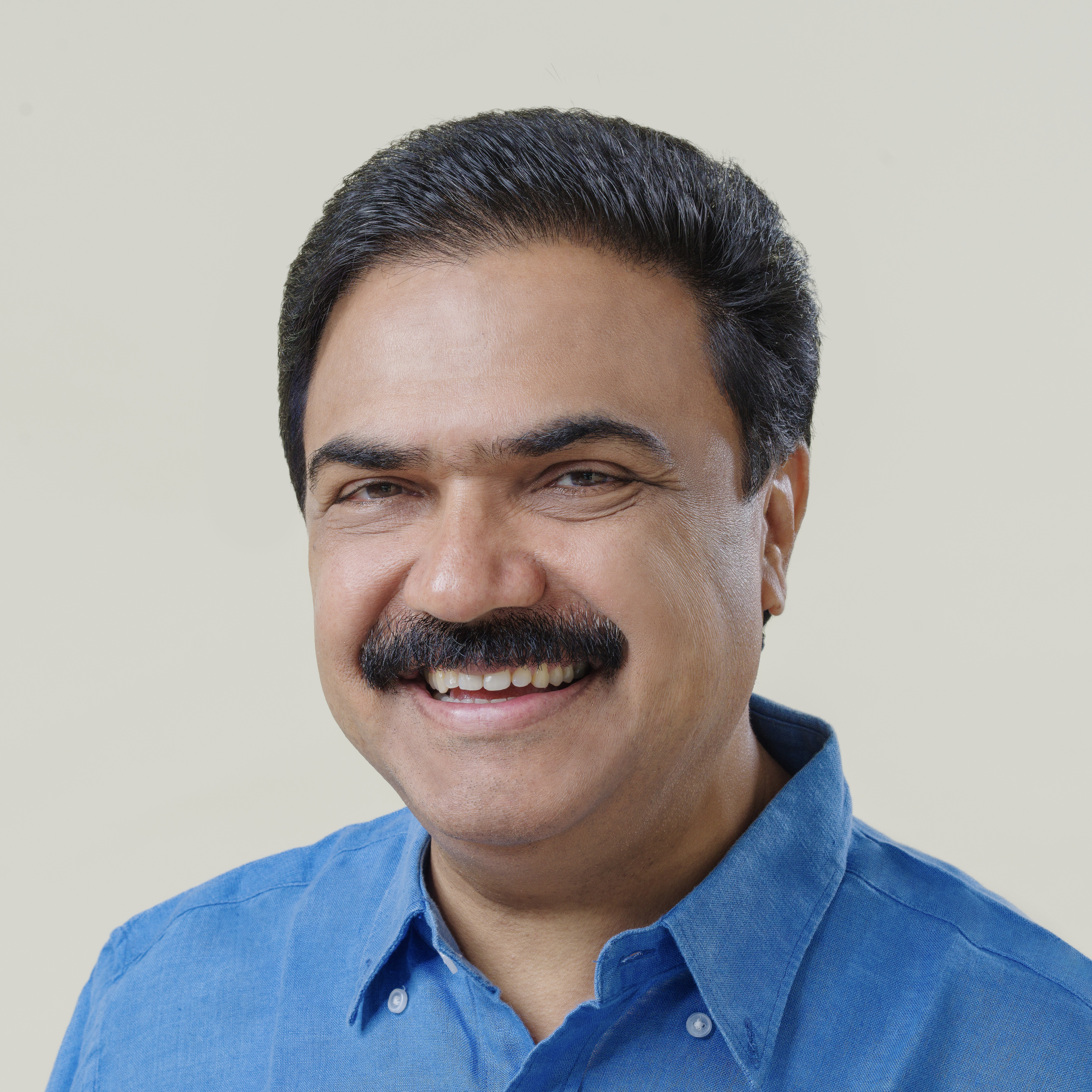

Member of Parliament, Rajya Sabha
- Incumbent
- Assumed office 2 July 2018
- Preceded by: Joy Abraham
- Constituency: Kerala

Chair, Kerala Congress (M)
- Preceded by: K. M. Mani

Member of Parliament, Lok Sabha
- In office 31 May 2009 – 14 June 2018
- Preceded by: K. Suresh Kurup
- Succeeded by: Thomas Chazhikadan
- Constituency: Kottayam

Personal details
- Born: Jose Karingozhackal Mani; 29 May 1965 (age 61) Pala, Kottayam, Kerala, India
- Party: Kerala Congress (M)
- Spouse: Nisha Jose (m. 1994)
- Children: 3
- Parents: K. M. Mani; Kuttiyamma
- Education: Montfort School, Yercaud; Loyola College, Chennai; PSG College of Arts and Science, Coimbatore

Jose Karingozhackal Mani (born 29 May 1965) is an Indian politician and MP (Rajya Sabha) and former MP (Lok Sabha) from Kerala. He is the son of veteran politician K. M. Mani and the Chairman of Kerala Congress (M).

== Political life ==
Electoral History
Election	Party	House	Constituency	Status
2004	KCM in UDF	Lok Sabha	Muvattupuzha	Lost
2009	KCM in UDF	Lok Sabha	Kottayam	Won
2014	KCM in UDF	Lok Sabha	Kottayam	Won
2021	KCM in LDF	Kerala Legislative Assembly	Pala	Lost
2026	KCM in LDF	Kerala Legislative Assembly	Pala	Lost

=== Rajya Sabha ===
Position	Party	Constituency	From	To	Tenure
Member of Parliament, Rajya Sabha (1st Term)	KC(M)	Kerala	2 July 2018	11 Jan 2021	2 years, 193 days
Member of Parliament, Rajya Sabha (2nd Term)	KC(M)	Kerala	30 Nov 2021	1 July 2024	2 years, 214 days
Member of Parliament, Rajya Sabha (3rd Term)	KC(M)	Kerala	2 July 2024	1 July 2030	5 years, 364 days

He unsuccessfully contested the parliament election in 2004 from Muvattupuzha constituency, losing to P. C. Thomas who contested as the candidate of National Democratic Alliance (NDA). In 2007, he was elected as the General Secretary of Kerala Congress (Mani) party. He won the 2009 Lok Sabha election from the Kottayam constituency, by a margin of more than 70,000 votes over K. Suresh Kurup of CPI(M). He was re-elected in 2014 with a winning margin of 120,599 over Mathew T. Thomas of JD(S).

He is also the President of Vikasana Sena, a youth association associated with Prateeksha Rotary Centre for Mentally Challenged Children.

=== As chairman of Kerala Congress (M) ===
After the death of KEC(M) chairman K. M. Mani, a power struggle erupted in the party between Jose K. Mani faction and P. J. Joseph faction. The Election Commission intervened and ruled in favor of Jose K. Mani. Later, the faction led by P. J. Joseph merged with Kerala Congress and faction led by Jose K. Mani elected K. M. Mani's son Jose K. Mani as the Chairman of Kerala Congress (M).

=== Expulsion from UDF ===
After the death of K. M. Mani, UDF asked the Mani faction to give up the post of Kottayam District Panchayat presidency which they dismissed, as per a previous agreement. UDF expelled KEC(M) from the alliance on 30 June 2020 citing the District Panchayat presidency dispute. Later, Jose K. Mani and his party KEC(M), joined the LDF alliance in October 2020.

=== With Left Democratic Front (2020–present) ===
Kerala Congress (M) joined hands with the LDF for the 2020 Kerala local elections held in December and also for the 2021 Kerala Legislative Assembly election. It is alleged that KC(M) allowed a CPI(M) party member to contest as a KEC(M) candidate in the Piravom Assembly constituency. During the 2021 Kerala Legislative Assembly election, Jose K. Mani was defeated from the Pala constituency for more than 15,000 votes to the UDF candidate Mani C. Kappan.

== Personal life ==
Jose K. Mani was born in a Syrian Catholic family to K. M. Mani and Kuttiyama on 29 May 1965 in Pala, Kerala. Mani did his schooling at St. Thomas Primary School, Pala and Montfort School, Yercaud, where Indian actor Vikram was his classmate. He attended Loyola College, Chennai for his undergraduate degree in B.Com and then graduated with a M.B.A from PSG College of Arts and Science, Coimbatore.

Preceded by K. Suresh Kurup	Member of Parliament from Kottayam; 2009 – 2018	Succeeded by Thomas Chazhikadan
