= Ettumanoor Assembly constituency =

Constituency of the Kerala Legislative assembly

Ettumanoor
- Constituency No. 96 for the Kerala Legislative Assembly
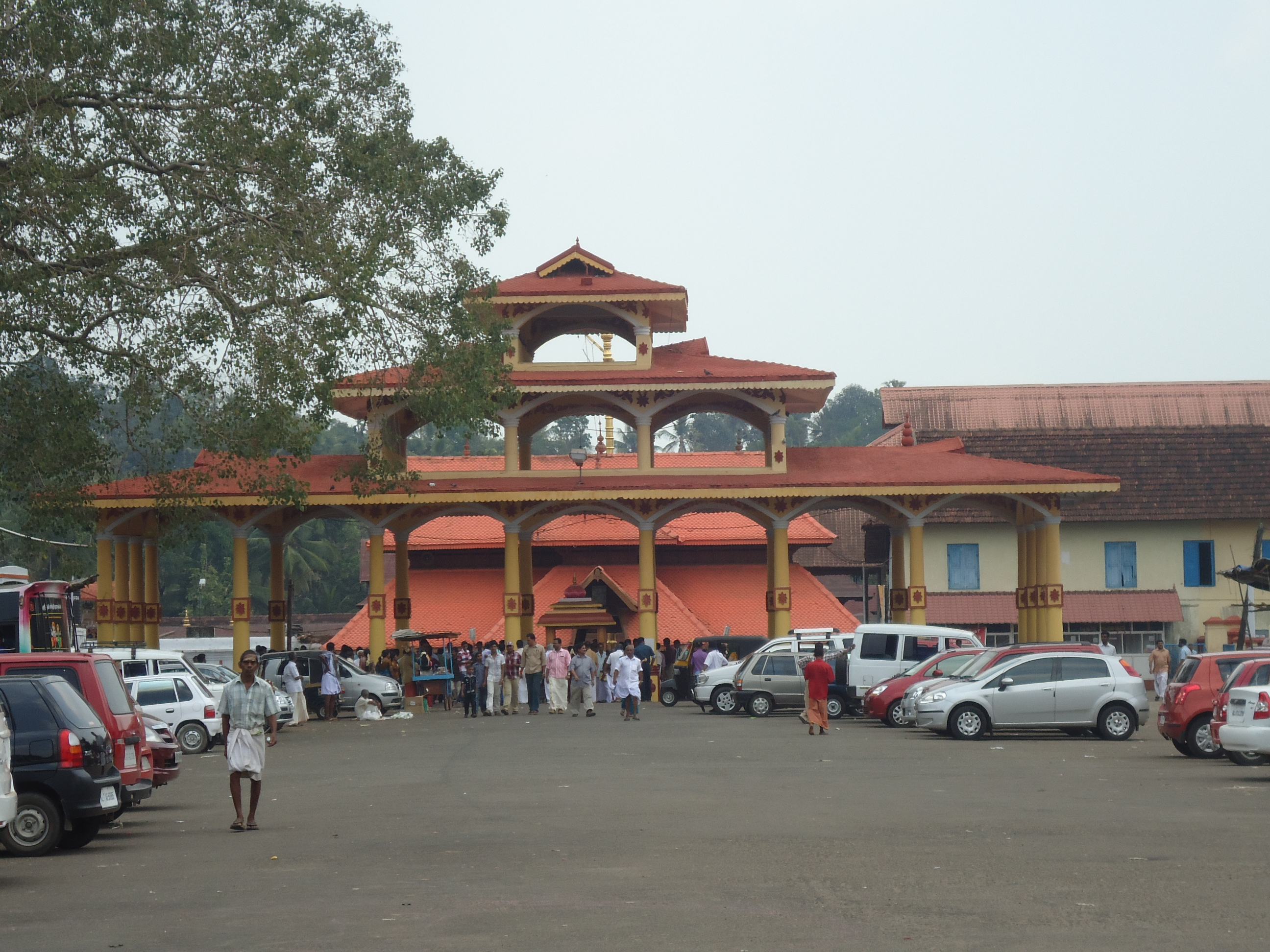
- Famous Ettumanoor mahadeva temple

Constituency details
- Country: India
- Region: South India
- State: Kerala
- Established: 1957
- Total electors: 1,32,313 (2016)
- Reservation: None

Member of Legislative Assembly
- 16th Kerala Legislative Assembly
- Incumbent Nattakom Suresh
- Party: Indian National Congress
- Elected year: 2026

Ettumanoor State assembly constituency is one of the 140 state legislative assembly constituencies in Kerala in southern India. It is also one of the seven state legislative assembly constituencies included in Kottayam Lok Sabha constituency. The incumbent Member of Legislative Assembly for Ettumanoor is Nattakom Suresh of Indian National Congress.

== Local self-governed segments ==
Ettumanoor Assembly constituency is composed of the following local self-governed segments:

Sl no.	Name	Status (Grama panchayat/Municipality)	Taluk
1	Ettumanoor	Municipality	Kottayam
2	Aymanam	Grama panchayat	Kottayam
3	Arpookara	Grama panchayat	Kottayam
4	Athirampuzha	Grama panchayat	Kottayam
5	Kumarakom	Grama panchayat	Kottayam
6	Neendoor	Grama panchayat	Kottayam
7	Thiruvarpu	Grama panchayat	Kottayam

== Members of Legislative Assembly ==
The following list contains all members of Kerala Legislative Assembly who have represented the constituency:

Election	Niyama Sabha	Member	Party	Tenure
1957	1st	Joseph George	Indian National Congress	1957 – 1960
1960	2nd	Joseph George	Indian National Congress	1960 – 1965
1967	3rd	P. P. Wilson	Samyukta Socialist Party	1967 – 1970
1970	4th	P. B. R. Pillai	Socialist Party	1970 – 1977
1977	5th	P. B. R. Pillai	Janata Party	1977 – 1980
1980	6th	Vaikom Vishwan	Communist Party of India	1980 – 1982
1982	7th	E. J. Lukose	Kerala Congress	1982 – 1987
1987	8th	Joseph George	Independent	1987 – 1991
1991	9th	Thomas Chazhikkadan	Kerala Congress	1991 – 1996
1996	10th	Thomas Chazhikkadan	Kerala Congress	1996 – 2001
2001	11th	Thomas Chazhikkadan	Kerala Congress	2001 – 2006
2006	12th	Thomas Chazhikkadan	Kerala Congress	2006 – 2011
2011	13th	K. Suresh Kurup	Communist Party of India	2011 – 2016
2016	14th	K. Suresh Kurup	Communist Party of India	2016 - 2021
2021	15th	V. N. Vasavan	Communist Party of India	2021 - 2026
2026	16^{th}	Nattakom Suresh	Indian National Congress	2026 – Incumbent

== Election results ==
Percentage change (±) denotes the change in the number of votes from the immediate previous election.

=== 2026 ===
2026 Kerala Legislative Assembly election: Ettumanoor
Party	Candidate	Votes	%	±%
INC	Nattakom Suresh	64,077	52.13	
CPI(M)	V. N. Vasavan	44,325	36.06	
TTP	Athira D. Nair	12,975	10.56	
BSP	Binoy Joseph Kulathunkal	455	0.37	
Margin of victory		19,752	16.07	
Turnout		1,22,912		
INC gain from CPI(M)		Swing		

=== 2021 ===
There were 1,68,266 registered voters in the constituency for the 2021 Kerala Assembly election.

2021 Kerala Legislative Assembly election: Ettumanoor
Party	Candidate	Votes	%	±%
CPI(M)	V. N. Vasavan	58,289	46.2	▲5.53
KEC	Adv. Prince Lukose	43,986	34.86	▲0.92
BJP	T. N. Harikumar	13,746	10.4	▼10.42
Independent	Lathika Subhash	7,624	6.04	−
BSP	Jijith K Joy	1,165	0.92	▲0.58
Margin of victory		14,303	11.34	▲4.61
Turnout		1,26,949	75.45	▼4.51
CPI(M) hold		Swing		

=== 2016 ===
There were 1,65,464 registered voters in the constituency for the 2016 Kerala Assembly election.

2016 Kerala Legislative Assembly election: Ettumanoor
Party	Candidate	Votes	%	±%
CPI(M)	K. Suresh Kurup	53,085	40.67	▼7.85
KC(M)	Thomas Chazhikadan	44,906	33.94	▼13.06
BDJS	A. G. Thankappan	27,540	20.82	−
Independent	Josemon Mundackal	3,774	2.85	−
SDPI	Abdul Nazar	706	0.53	−
NOTA	None of the above	600	0.45	−
BSP	C. P. Rajesh	453	0.34	▼0.31
PDP	M. S. Noushad	338	0.26	−
SUCI(C)	Asharaj	182	0.14	▼0.24
Margin of victory		8,899	6.73	▲5.21
Turnout		1,32,304	79.96	▲1.54
CPI(M) hold		Swing	▼7.85	

=== 2011 ===
There were 1,50,807 registered voters in the constituency for the 2011 election.

2011 Kerala Legislative Assembly election: Ettumanoor
Party	Candidate	Votes	%	±%
CPI(M)	K. Suresh Kurup	57,381	48.52	
KC(M)	Thomas Chazhikadan	55,580	47.00	−
BJP	V. G. Gopakumar	3,385	2.86	−
BSP	K .T. Thomas	763	0.65	−
Independent	Justin Mathew	466	0.39	−
SUCI(C)	E. V. Prakash	454	0.38	−
Independent	Anish Kumar	228	0.19	−
Margin of victory		1,801	1.52	
Turnout		1,18,257	78.42	
CPI(M) gain from KC(M)		Swing		

=== 2006 ===
2006 Kerala Legislative Assembly election: Ettumanoor
Party	Candidate	Votes	%	±%
KC(M)	Thomas Chazhikadan	48,789	50.34	
CPI(M)	K. S. Krishnankutty Nair	43,809	45.20	
BJP	Ettumanoor Radhakrishnan	3,262	3.37	
BSP	A. P. Jayaprakash	1,068	1.10	
Margin of victory		4,980	5.1	
Turnout		96,997	70.0	
KC(M) hold		Swing		

=== 2001 ===
2001 Kerala Legislative Assembly election: Ettumanoor
Party	Candidate	Votes	%	±%
KC(M)	Thomas Chazhikadan	59,525	58.78	
CPI(M)	Thampi Podippara	39,381	38.89	
Independent	Jose Varghese	1,469	1.45	
Independent	V. D. Jose	888	0.88	
Margin of victory		20,144	19.9	
Turnout		1,01,268	74.2	
KC(M) hold		Swing		

=== 1996 ===
1996 Kerala Legislative Assembly election: Ettumanoor
Party	Candidate	Votes	%	±%
KC(M)	Thomas Chazhikadan	53,632	54.33	
CPI(M)	Vaikom Viswan	39,759	40.27	
Independent	Ashok Ramachandran	3,492	3.52	
Independent	Haridas Krishnan	494	0.50	
Independent	Roffy Devasia Mathasseril	251	0.25	
Independent	P. S. Joy	224	0.23	
Independent	Varghese Cheriyan	213	0.22	
Akhil Bhartiya Shivsena (Rashtravadi)	Ettumanoor Chandra Bose	206	0.21	
Independent	J. P. Kalluparamban	113	0.11	
Independent	Rajesh Mathew	93	0.09	
Independent	Saji Kumaran	87	0.09	
Independent	O. J. Joseph	85	0.09	
Independent	Rajan Sreedharan Nair	71	0.07	
Margin of victory		13,873	14.1	
Turnout		1,01,783	72.3	
KC(M) hold		Swing		

== See also ==
- Ettumanoor
- Kottayam district
- List of constituencies of the Kerala Legislative Assembly
- 2016 Kerala Legislative Assembly election
