= Thomas Chazhikadan =

Indian politician (born 1952)

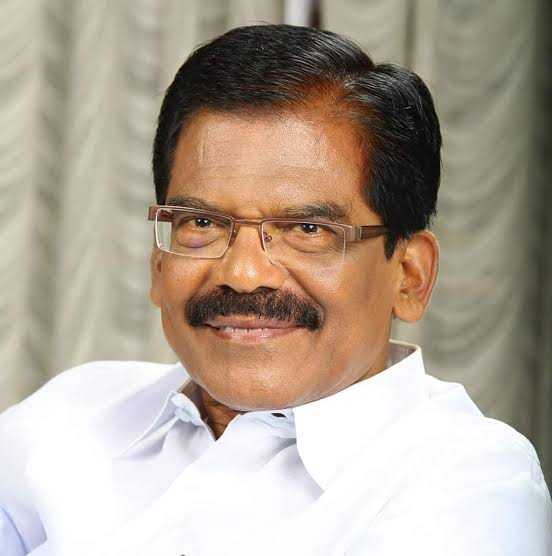

Member of Parliament, Lok Sabha
- In office 23 May 2019 – 4 June 2024
- Preceded by: Jose K. Mani
- Constituency: Kottayam

Member of the Kerala Legislative Assembly
- In office 19 June 1991 – 13 May 2011
- Succeeded by: K. Suresh Kurup
- Constituency: Ettumanoor

Personal details
- Born: 25 September 1952 (age 73) Ettumanoor, State of Travancore–Cochin (present day Kottayam, Kerala), India
- Party: Kerala Congress (M)
- Education: Institute of Chartered Accountants of India

Thomas Chazhikadan (born 25 September 1952) is an Indian politician and Chartered Accountant and former Member of Parliament from Kottayam Lok Sabha constituency from 2019 to 2024 and a former MLA of Kerala for Ettumanoor constituency from 1991 to 2011. He is a member of the Kerala Congress (M) and successfully contested as the party's candidate from Kottayam for the 2019 Lok Sabha election.

His elder brother, politician Babu Chazhikadan, was the original candidate from Ettumanoor, but killed by a lightning strike during the election campaign of 1991.

He is now a partner at Thomas Chazhikadan & Associates, a Chartered Accountancy firm in Kottayam, Kerala.

== Early life ==
Thomas Chazhikadan was born on 25 September 1952 at Veliyannoor, Kottayam to Cyriac and Aleyamma Chazhikadan. He was a member of several social service clubs such as YMCA; Y's Men International and Lions Club International. He has served as the President of the Kottayam District Co-operative Society and the Vice-President of the New Bank of India Officers Association. He had also been the Secretary of the Bankers Club, Kottayam and a member of the Mahatma Gandhi University Senate.
