= Nattakom Suresh =

Indian politician

Member of the Kerala Legislative Assembly
- Incumbent
- Assumed office 2021
- Parliamentary group: Indian National Congress
- Constituency: Ettumanoor

Nattakom Suresh is a politician from Kerala, India. He is a member of the Kerala Legislative Assembly. He represents Ettumanoor Assembly constituency in 16th Kerala State Legislative Assembly. He belongs to the Indian National Congress.
