= Pala Assembly constituency =

Constituency of the Kerala legislative assembly in India

Coordinates: 9°42′58.72″N 76°36′35.60″E

Pala
- Constituency No. 93 for the Kerala Legislative Assembly
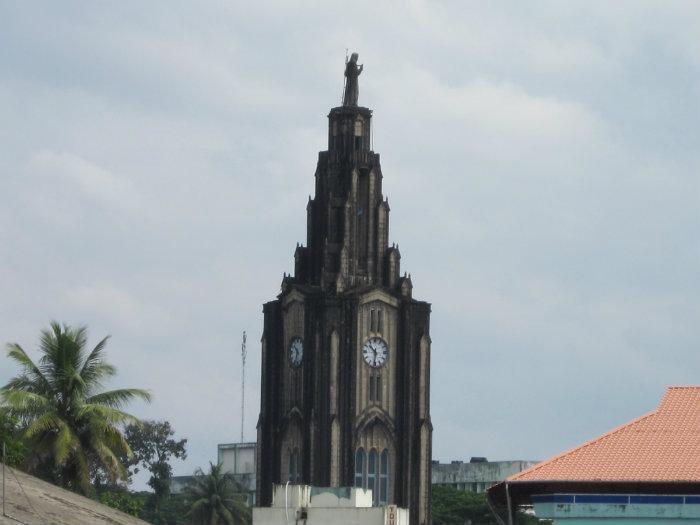

Constituency details
- Country: India
- Region: South India
- State: Kerala
- District: Kottayam
- Established: 1965
- Total electors: 1,84,857 (2019)
- Reservation: None

Member of Legislative Assembly
- 16th Kerala Legislative Assembly
- Incumbent Mani C. Kappan
- Party: KDP
- Alliance: UDF
- Elected year: 2026

Pala State assembly constituency is one of the 140 state legislative assembly constituencies in Kerala in southern India. It is also one of the seven state legislative assembly constituencies included in Kottayam Lok Sabha constituency. As of the 2026 Assembly elections, the current MLA is Mani C. Kappan of Kerala Democratic Party.

== Local self-governed segments ==
Pala Assembly constituency is composed of the following local self-governed segments:

| Sl no. | Name | Status (Grama panchayat/Municipality) | Taluk | Ruling alliance |
|---|---|---|---|---|
| 1 | Pala | Municipality | Meenachil | UDF |
| 2 | Bharananganam | Grama panchayat | Meenachil | UDF |
| 3 | Kadanad | Grama panchayat | Meenachil | UDF |
| 4 | Karoor | Grama panchayat | Meenachil | LDF |
| 5 | Kozhuvanal | Grama panchayat | Meenachil | UDF |
| 6 | Meenachil | Grama panchayat | Meenachil | UDF |
| 7 | Melukavu | Grama panchayat | Meenachil | UDF |
| 8 | Moonilavu | Grama panchayat | Meenachil | UDF |
| 9 | Mutholy | Grama panchayat | Meenachil | LDF |
| 10 | Ramapuram | Grama panchayat | Meenachil | UDF |
| 11 | Thalanadu | Grama panchayat | Meenachil | LDF |
| 12 | Thalappalam | Grama panchayat | Meenachil | UDF |
| 13 | Elikkulam | Grama panchayat | Kanjirappally | UDF |

== Members of the Legislative Assembly ==
The following list contains all members of Kerala Legislative Assembly who have represented Pala Assembly constituency during the period of various assemblies:

| Year | Name | Party |
|---|---|---|
| 1965 | K. M. Mani | Kerala Congress |
| 1967 | K. M. Mani | Kerala Congress |
| 1970 | K. M. Mani | Kerala Congress |
| 1977 | K. M. Mani | Kerala Congress |
| 1980 | K. M. Mani | Kerala Congress |
| 1982 | K. M. Mani | Kerala Congress |
| 1987 | K. M. Mani | Kerala Congress (M) |
| 1991 | K. M. Mani | Kerala Congress (M) |
| 1996 | K. M. Mani | Kerala Congress (M) |
| 2001 | K. M. Mani | Kerala Congress (M) |
| 2006 | K. M. Mani | Kerala Congress (M) |
| 2011 | K. M. Mani | Kerala Congress (M) |
| 2016 | K. M. Mani | Kerala Congress (M) |
| 2019^ | Mani C. Kappan | Nationalist Congress Party |
| 2021 | Mani C. Kappan | Democratic Congress Kerala |
| 2026 | Mani C. Kappan | Independent politician |

*by-election

== Election results ==
Percentage change (±) denotes the change in the number of votes from the immediate previous election.

=== 2026 ===
There were 1, 76,726 registered voters in the constituency for the 2026 Kerala Legislative Assembly election. UDF-backed candidate Mani C. Kappan contested the election as an independent candidate.

2026 Kerala Legislative Assembly election: Pala
| Party | Candidate | Votes | % | ±% |
|---|---|---|---|---|
| Independent | Mani C. Kappan | 50,799 | 37.39 | ▼13.04 |
| KC(M) | Jose K. Mani | 47,808 | 35.19 | ▼4.13 |
| BJP | Adv. Shone George | 35,304 | 25.99 | ▲18.14 |
| NOTA | None of the above | 583 | 0.43 | ▼0.01 |
| AAP | Adv. Rony Nedumpallil | 506 | 0.37 | − |
| Independent | C G Babu | 325 | 0.24 | − |
| BSP | Santhosh Nadoopparampil | 254 | 0.19 | ▼0.08 |
| Independent | Santhosh Pulickal | 272 | 0.20 | ▼0.12 |
| Margin of victory | | 2,991 | 2.30 | ▼8.81 |
| Turnout | | 1,35,851 | 76.87 | ▲0.41 |
| UDF hold | | Swing | | |

=== 2021 ===
There were 1,84,857 registered voters in the constituency for the 2021 election.

2021 Kerala Legislative Assembly election: Pala
| Party | Candidate | Votes | % | ±% |
|---|---|---|---|---|
| DCK | Mani C. Kappan | 69,804 | 50.43 | ▲10.19 |
| KC(M) | Jose K. Mani | 54,426 | 39.32 | ▼3.23 |
| BJP | Prameeladevi J. | 10,869 | 7.85 | ▼6.33 |
| Independent | Mani C. Kuriakose | 1,098 | 0.79 | |
| NOTA | None of the above | 604 | 0.44 | |
| Independent | Santosh Pulickal | 444 | 0.32 | |
| BSP | Joy Thomas Vazhamattom | 368 | 0.27 | |
| Independent | C. V. John | 249 | 0.18 | − |
| Independent | Sreejith V. S. | 195 | 0.14 | |
| Independent | Thomas J. Nidiry | 160 | 0.12 | |
| Independent | Albin Mathew | 121 | 0.09 | − |
| Independent | Sunil Alancheril | 93 | 0.07 | |
| Margin of victory | | 15,378 | 11.11 | ▲8.80 |
| Turnout | | 1,38,431 | 76.46 | ▲5.49 |
| DCK gain from NCP | | Swing | ▲10.19 | |

=== 2019 by-election ===
Due to the death of the sitting MLA K. M. Mani in April 2019, Pala Assembly constituency held a by-election on 23 September 2019.

There were 1,79,107 registered voters in Pala Assembly constituency for the 2019 Kerala Assembly by-election.

2019 Kerala Legislative Assembly by-elections: Pala
| Party | Candidate | Votes | % | ±% |
|---|---|---|---|---|
| NCP | Mani C. Kappan | 54,137 | 42.55 | ▲3.79 |
| KC(M) | Jose Tom Pulikkunnel | 51,194 | 40.24 | ▼1.89 |
| BJP | N. Hari | 18,044 | 14.18 | ▼3.58 |
| Independent | C. J. Philip | 1,085 | 0.85 | − |
| Independent | Maju Puthenkandam | 1,012 | 0.80 | − |
| NOTA | None of the above | 742 | 0.58 | |
| Independent | George Pooveli | 565 | 0.44 | |
| Independent | Tom Thomas | 303 | 0.24 | |
| Independent | Ignatious Illimoottil | 233 | 0.18 | |
| Independent | Joseph Jacob | 178 | 0.14 | |
| Independent | Babu Joseph | 130 | 0.10 | |
| Independent | Joemon Joseph Srampickal | 130 | 0.10 | |
| Independent | Joby Thomas | 112 | 0.09 | |
| Independent | Sunilkumar | 97 | 0.08 | |
| Margin of victory | | 2,943 | 2.31 | ▼1.06 |
| Turnout | | 1,27,220 | 70.97 | ▼6.64 |
| NCP gain from KC(M) | | Swing | ▲3.79 | |

=== 2016 ===
There were 1,80,091 registered voters in the constituency for the 2016 Kerala Assembly election.

2016 Kerala Legislative Assembly election: Pala
| Party | Candidate | Votes | % | ±% |
|---|---|---|---|---|
| KC(M) | K. M. Mani | 58,884 | 42.13 | ▼7.01 |
| NCP | Mani C. Kappan | 54,181 | 38.78 | ▼6.14 |
| BJP | N. Hari | 24,821 | 17.76 | ▲12.66 |
| NOTA | None of the above | 907 | 0.65 | − |
| Independent | Jose Thomas Padiyammakkal | 489 | 0.35 | − |
| Independent | Anthony | 217 | 0.16 | |
| Independent | Shaiju Ponkunnam | 103 | 0.07 | |
| Independent | Hassan Kunju P. S. | 90 | 0.06 | |
| Independent | Babu | 83 | 0.06 | |
| Margin of victory | | 4,703 | 3.37 | ▼0.85 |
| Turnout | | 1,39,775 | 77.61 | ▲3.95 |
| KC(M) hold | | Swing | ▼7.01 | |

=== 2011 ===
There were 1,69,192 registered voters in the constituency for the 2011 election.

2011 Kerala Legislative Assembly election: Pala
| Party | Candidate | Votes | % | ±% |
|---|---|---|---|---|
| KC(M) | K. M. Mani | 61,239 | 49.14 | ▼2.40 |
| NCP | Mani C. Kappan | 55,980 | 44.92 | ▲1.96 |
| BJP | B. Vijayakumar | 6,359 | 5.10 | ▲1.16 |
| Independent | C. V. John | 576 | 0.46 | − |
| Independent | James Joseph | 465 | 0.16 | |
| Margin of victory | | 5,259 | 4.22 | ▼4.36 |
| Turnout | | 1,24,619 | 73.66 | ▲3.10 |
| KC(M) hold | | Swing | ▼2.40 | |

=== 2006 ===
There were 1,28,184 registered voters in the constituency for the 2006 election.

2006 Kerala Legislative Assembly election: Pala
| Party | Candidate | Votes | % | ±% |
|---|---|---|---|---|
| KC(M) | K. M. Mani | 46,608 | 51.54 | ▼11.83 |
| NCP | Mani C. Kappan | 38,849 | 42.96 | ▲6.33 |
| BJP | S. Jayasooryan | 3,566 | 3.94 | |
| BSP | P. I. Thankachan | 362 | 0.40 | |
| Independent | Shiby M. Aikkara | 319 | 0.35 | |
| Independent | K. T. Mathew | 310 | 0.34 | |
| Independent | Paul | 230 | 0.25 | |
| Independent | V. A. Sunny | 191 | 0.21 | |
| Rejected | Rejected & Missing Votes | 18 | | |
| Margin of victory | | 7,759 | 8.58 | ▼18.16 |
| Turnout | | 90,453 | 70.56 | ▲6.54 |
| KC(M) hold | | Swing | ▼11.83 | |

=== 2001 ===
There were 1,30,305 registered voters in the constituency for the 2001 election.

2001 Kerala Legislative Assembly election: Pala
| Party | Candidate | Votes | % | ±% |
|---|---|---|---|---|
| KC(M) | K. M. Mani | 52,838 | 63.37 | |
| NCP | Uzhavoor Vijayan | 30,537 | 36.63 | |
| Rejected | Rejected & Missing Votes | 50 | | |
| Margin of victory | | 22,301 | 26.74 | |
| Turnout | | 83,425 | 64.02 | |
| KC(M) hold | | Swing | | |

== See also ==
- Pala
- Kottayam district
- List of constituencies of the Kerala Legislative Assembly
- 2016 Kerala Legislative Assembly election
- 2019 Kerala Legislative Assembly by-elections
