= V. N. Vasavan =

Indian politician

V. N. Vasawan
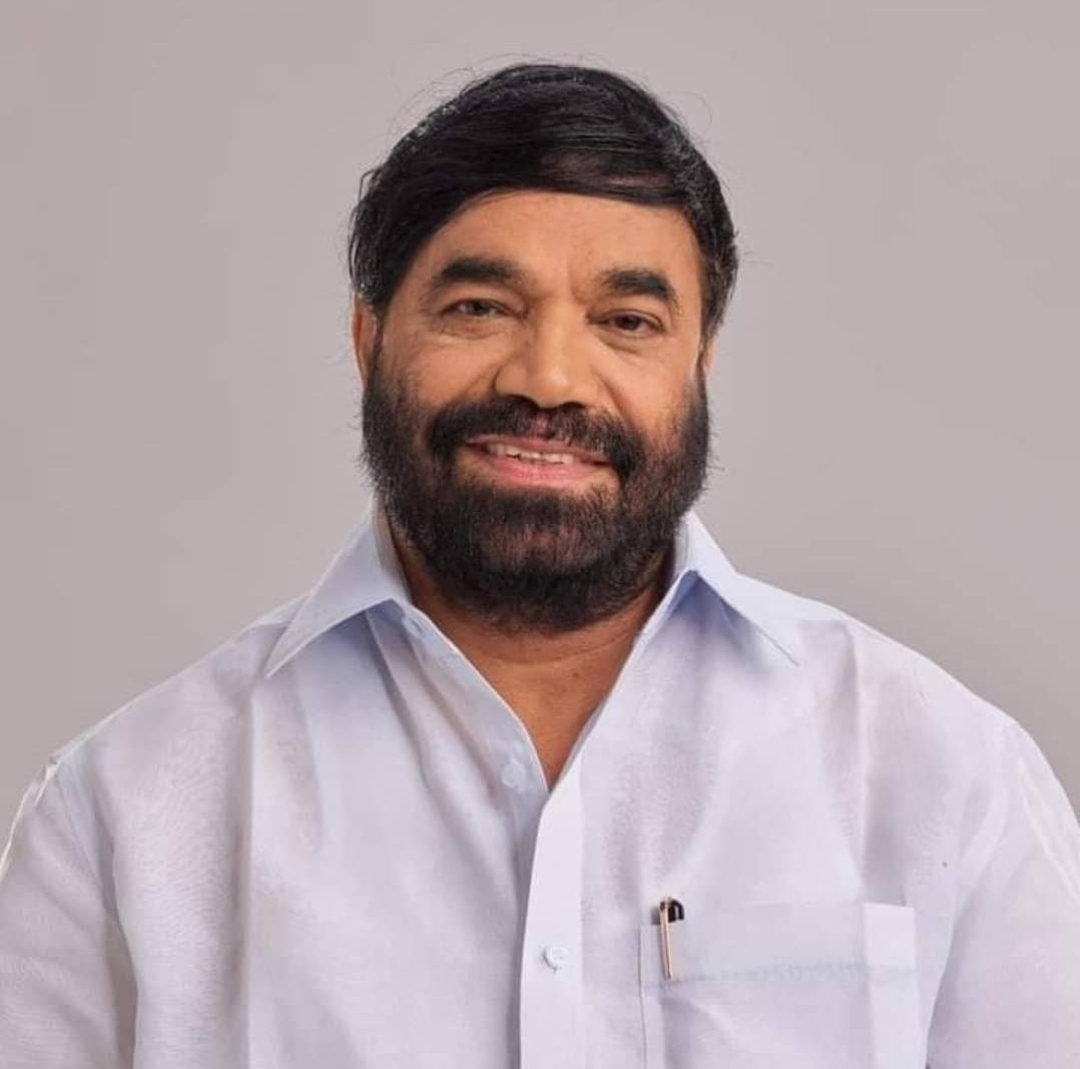

Minister for Devasoms, Government of Kerala
- In office 23 June 2024 – 17 May 2026
- Chief Minister: Pinarayi Vijayan
- Preceded by: K. Radhakrishnan (politician)
- Succeeded by: K. Muraleedharan

Minister for Registration and Co-operation, Government of Kerala
- In office 20 May 2021 – 29 December 2023
- Chief Minister: Pinarayi Vijayan
- Preceded by: Kadakampally Surendran (Minister for Co-operation); G. Sudhakaran (Minister for Registration)
- Succeeded by: Himself (Co-operation) Ramachandran Kadannappalli (Registration)

Minister for Ports and Co-operation, Government of Kerala
- In office 29 December 2023 - 17 May 2026
- Preceded by: Himself (Co-operation), Ahamed Devarkovil (Ports)
- Succeeded by: V. D. Satheesan (Minister Of Ports) M. Liju ] (Minister for Co-operation)

Minister for Cinema and Culture, Government of Kerala
- In office 06 July 2022 - 04 January 2023
- Preceded by: Saji Cherian
- Succeeded by: Saji Cherian

Member of the Kerala Legislative Assembly
- In office 24 May 2021 – 23 May 2026
- Preceded by: K. Suresh Kurup
- Constituency: Ettumanoor
- In office 2006–2011
- Preceded by: Mercy Ravi
- Succeeded by: Thiruvanchoor Radhakrishnan
- Constituency: Kottayam

Personal details
- Born: 9 August 1954 (age 72) Mattakkara, Kottayam
- Party: Communist Party of India (Marxist)

V.N. Vasavan (born in 1954) is an Indian politician and was a former Minister in the second pinarayi ministry in Kerala. He was elected from Ettumanoor assembly constituency of the Communist Party of India (Marxist) in Kottayam district. Vasavan was the member of the Kerala Legislature for the constituency of Ettumanoor.

== Political career ==
Vasavan entered politics through student federation. Then he was district joint secretary of KSYF and DYFI. He became a member of the Communist Party of India (Marxist) in 1974, elected as a District Committee Member in 1991, as District Secretariat Member in 1997 and as Kottayam District Secretary in the district conference held at Ettumanoor on 18 January 2015. Vasavan is one of the State Committee members of CPIM Kerala.

He was a member of Pampady Grampanchayath, President Pampady Housing Cooperative Society, President of Kottayam District Cooperative Bank, Director of State Cooperative Bank, General Secretary Kerala Private Hospital Employees Federation, Syndicate Member Sree Shankaracharya University of Sanskrit, Kalady and District President of CITU, Kottayam.

Vasavan contested the Kerala Legislature elections from Puthuppally in 1987 and 1991 and from Kottayam in 2006 and 2011. He was MLA for Kottayam between 2006 and 2011. Now Vasavan is the District Secretary of CPI(M), Kottayam District, State Committee Member of CPI(M), Director Board Member of RUBCO, General Council and Working Committee member of CITU, President of the Navalokam Cultural Center, General Secretary Pampady Range Toddy Workers Union and President Captain Lakshmy Charitable Society. Vasavan is the Advisory Board Chairman of ABHAYAM CHARITABLE SOCIETY Kottayam.
