= Benny Behanan =

Indian politician (born 1952)

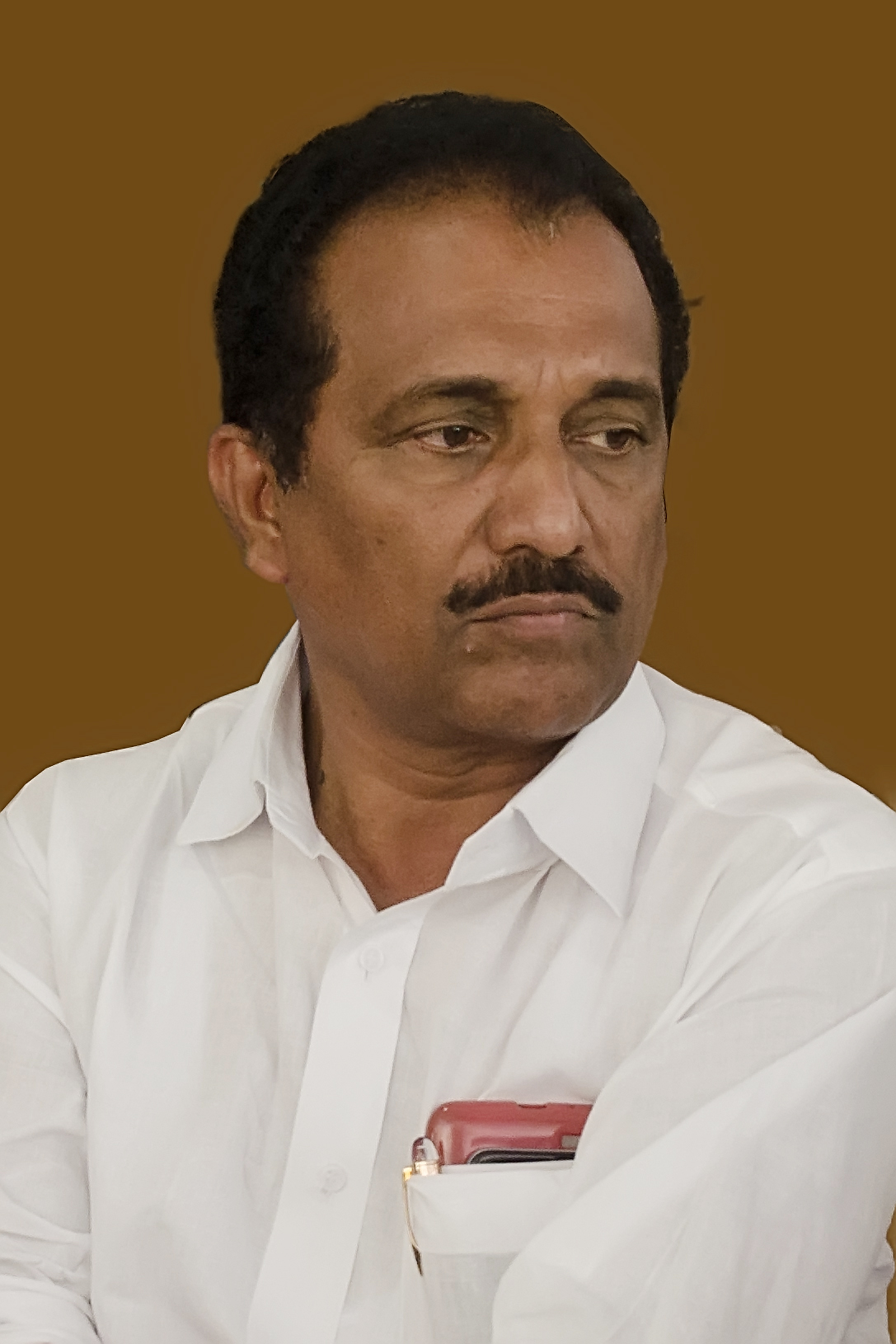

Member of Parliament, Lok Sabha
- Incumbent
- Assumed office 23 May 2019
- Preceded by: Innocent
- Constituency: Chalakudy

Personal details
- Born: 22 August 1952 (age 73) Vengola, Travancore-Cochin (present-day Perumbavoor, Kerala), India
- Party: Indian National Congress
- Spouse: Sherly Benny
- Children: 1 son & 1 daughter
- Parent(s): O. Thomas, Chinnamma Thomas
- Website: www.bennybehanan.in

Benny Behanan (born 22 August 1952) is an Indian politician from Kerala. He is a member of the Indian National Congress party who serves as Member of Parliament from Chalakudy (Lok Sabha constituency). He was the MLA of Thrikkakara Legislative Assembly Constituency from 2011 to 2016. He was the General Secretary of the Kerala Pradesh Congress Committee for 17 years. Earlier he had won Piravom in 1982, and unsuccessfully contested the Idukki Parliament Constituency as UDF Candidate to the Lok Sabha in 2004. In 2019 Indian general election, he won the election with a margin of 1,32,274 votes against the LDF candidate Innocent (actor). In 2024 Indian general election, he won the election with a margin of 63,754 votes against the LDF candidate C. Raveendranath.

== Political life ==
Hailing from a Congress family, Benny Behanan has held var ious positions within the party.

- State president of the Kerala Students Union (KSU) from 1978 to 1979
- General Secretary, Kerala Pradesh Youth Congress Committee from 1979 to 1982
- Member of KPCC Executive Since 1981
- In 1982, he was elected to the Kerala State Legislative Assembly
- All India Congress Committee (AICC) Member since 1996
- Managing Director, Veekshanam Daily Newspaper since 2006
- President of Thrissur District Congress Committee since 2010
- Member Legislative Assembly in 2011 (Thrikkakkara Constituency)
- Convenor, United Democratic Front (UDF), 2018 - 2020

== Personal life ==
Benny Behanan was born to O. Thomas and Chinnamma Thomas on 22 August 1952 at Vengola, near Perumbavoor in present-day Kerala, South India.
