= Kerala Congress (M) =

Kerala Congress (Mani)
- Abbreviation: KEC(M)
- Chairperson: Jose K. Mani
- Rajya Sabha Leader: Jose K. Mani
- Founder: K. M. Mani
- Founded: 1979; 47 years ago
- Split from: Kerala Congress
- Headquarters: State Committee Office, Near Fire Station, Kottayam
- Newspaper: Prathichaya weekly
- Student wing: Kerala Students Congress (M)
- Youth wing: Kerala Youth Front (M)
- Women's wing: Kerala Vanitha Congress (M)
- Labour wing: Kerala Trade Union Congress (M)
- Ideology: Manism; Democratic socialism
- Political position: Centre
- Colours: White Red
- ECI Status: State Party
- Alliance: Left Democratic Front (1979–1989, 2020–present); INDIA (2024–present); United Democratic Front (1989–2020)
- Seats in Rajya Sabha: 1 / 245
- Seats in Lok Sabha: 0 / 543
- Seats in Kerala Legislative Assembly: 0 / 140
- Number of states and union territories in government: 0 / 31

Election symbol

Party flag

Website
- www.keralacongressm.co.in

Kerala Congress (M) or Kerala Congress (Mani) is a state-level political party in the Indian state of Kerala, currently led by chairman Jose K. Mani. It was founded by K. M. Mani in 1979, after a split from the Kerala Congress. The party is a part of the Left Democratic Front since October 2020.

== History ==
Kerala Congress (M) was formed in 1979 after a split in Kerala Congress party. After a series of splits and mergers, Kerala Congress faction of P. J. Joseph merged with Kerala Congress(M). It split again when some leaders including Francis George, Dr. K. C. Joseph, Antony Raju and P. C. Joseph resigned from KEC(M) and formed the Janadhipathya Kerala Congress in 2016. KEC(M) quit the UDF in 2016 citing issues with in the UDF, and rejoined it in June 2018 after reconciliation.

=== Split ===
A power struggle erupted in the party after the death of Kerala Congress (M) chairman K. M. Mani. One faction was led by his son Jose K. Mani and another was led by senior leader P. J. Joseph. The Election Commission intervened and it ruled in favor of Jose K Mani. The commission passed a verdict recognizing the faction led by Jose K. Mani as the Kerala Congress (M). This was challenged by P. J. Joseph in court and he was granted an interim stay order. The Jose faction approached the Supreme Court of India and it agreed with the Election Commission's verdict. UDF Convener Benny Behanan met with Jose K Mani and following the meeting, he announced that the Jose faction was expelled from UDF as a result of a dispute in Kottayam district panchayat.

Later Kerala Congress (M) joined LDF.

==== Ministers from the Kerala Congress (M) Faction ====
2011
Minister	Ministry
K. M. Mani	Minister for Finance; State Treasury, Taxes & Duties; Law and Housing (May 2011–November 2015)
P. J. Joseph	Minister for Water Resources; Irrigation and Inland Navigation (May 2011–May 2016); (After split changed to Kerala Congress (J))
P. C. George	Chief Whip (2011–2015)
Thomas Unniyadan	Chief Whip (June–November 2015)

2001
Minister	Ministry
K. M. Mani	Minister for Law & Revenue
C. F. Thomas	Minister for Rural Development

1991
Minister	Ministry
K. M. Mani	Minister for Law & Revenue
Narayana Kurup	Deputy Speaker

=== With Left Democratic Front (Kerala) (2020–Present) ===
Kerala Congress (M) joined hands with LDF for the 2020 Kerala local elections held in December and also for the 2021 Kerala Legislative Assembly election. However KEC(M) allegedly allowed a CPI(M) party member to contest as a KEC(M) candidate from Piravom (State Assembly constituency). In the 2021 Kerala Legislative Assembly election, KEC(M) contested 12 seats and won 5 of them. However, KEC(M) chairman Jose K. Mani lost from Pala (State Assembly constituency) to incumbent MLA Mani C. Kappan of the Nationalist Congress Kerala for 15,378 votes. The loss of this seat is a considered a major setback for Jose K. Mani, as Pala was the original constituency represented by his late father, K. M. Mani, for 49 years from 1967 to 2016.

==== Ministers Of the Kerala Congress (M) faction With LDF ====
2021
Minister	Ministry
Roshy Augustine	Minister for Water Resources, Irrigation and Inland Navigation
N. Jayaraj	Chief Whip

On 18 May 2021, the LDF and KEC (M) declared that Kanjirappally (State Assembly constituency) MLA N. Jayaraj is to be the chief whip of the alliance. Idukki (State Assembly constituency) MLA Roshy Augustine is set to become a minister.

Members of Kerala Legislative Assembly

- Roshy Augustine
- N. Jayaraj
- Job Michael
- Sebastian Kulathunkal
- Pramod Narayan

Members of Parliament

- Jose K. Mani (Rajya Sabha)

== Electoral performance ==
Lok Sabha election results in Kerala
Election Year	Alliance	Seats contested	Seats won	Total Votes	Percentage of votes	± Vote
2024	LDF	1	0 / 20	277,365	1.38%	▼0.70%
2019	UDF	1	1 / 20	421,046	2.08%	▼0.28%
2014	UDF	1	1 / 20	424,194	2.36%	▼0.17%
2009	UDF	1	1 / 20	404,962	2.53%	▲1.14%
2004	UDF	1	0 / 20	209,880	1.39%	▼0.91%
1999	UDF	1	1 / 20	357,402	2.30%	▼0.10%
1998	UDF	1	1 / 20	356,168	2.40%	▼0.26%
1996	UDF	1	1 / 20	356,168	2.66%	▼0.04%
1991	UDF	1	1 / 20	384,255	2.70%	▲0.34%
1989	UDF	1	1 / 20	352,191	2.36%	New

Kerala Legislative Assembly election results
Election Year	Alliance	Seats contested	Seats won	Total Votes	Percentage of votes	± Vote
2026	LDF	12	0 / 140	561,157	2.60%	▼0.68%
2021	LDF	12	5 / 140	684,363	3.28%	▼0.71%
2016	UDF	15	5 / 140	807,718	3.99%	▼0.95%
2011	UDF	15	9 / 140	861,829	4.94%	▲1.68%
2006	UDF	11	7 / 140	507,349	3.26%	▼0.28%
2001	UDF	11	9 / 140	556,647	3.54%	▲0.36%
1996	UDF	10	5 / 140	453,614	3.18%	▼1.14%
1991	UDF	13	10 / 140	611,702	4.32%	▼1.54%
1982	UDF	17	6 / 140	559,930	5.86%	▲0.61%
1980	LDF	17	8 / 140	500,894	5.25%	New

== Party Organisation ==
Jose K. Mani is the Chairman of the party since 2020.

=== Other Notable leaders ===
- K.M Mani, founder
- K. Narayana Kurup
- Dr.George Mathew
- Mammen Mathai
- A.George
- Varkey George
- Babu Chazikadan

== See also ==
- List of political parties in India
