= Aranmula (disambiguation) =

Aranmula is a town in Kerala, India.

Aranmula may also refer to these within the town:

- Aranmula Assembly constituency, Kerala Legislative Assembly
- Aranmula International Airport
- Aranmula Boat Race
- Aranmula kannadi, an Indian handmade metal-alloy mirror
- Aranmula Kottaram, a palace in Kerala, India
- Aranmula Mangattu Palace
- Aranmula Parthasarathy Temple, a Hindu (Krishna) temple in Kerala, India
- Aranmula Ponnamma, Indian actress
