= V. S. Vijayan =

Indian environmentalist

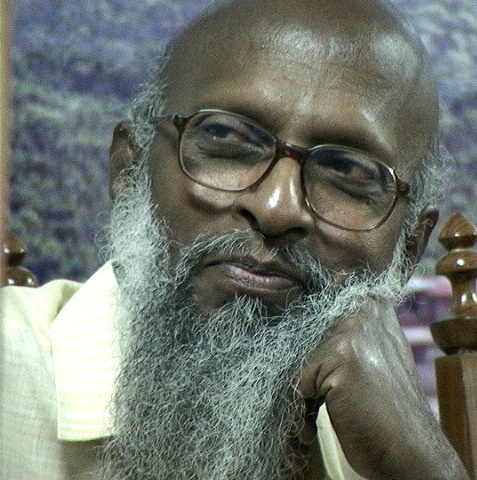
- Dr. V. S. Vijayan
- Born: 1947 (age 78–79); Kerala
- Education: Mumbai University
- Known for: Gadgil Committee; Impact studies on hydro-electric and developmental projects
- Scientific career
- Fields: Ecology, Wetland ecology, Ornithology
- Workplaces: Bombay Natural History Society, Sálim Ali Centre for Ornithology and Natural History, The Kerala State Biodiversity Board
- Doctoral advisor: Salim Ali

Vadayil Sankaran Vijayan (വി. എസ്. വിജയന്‍) (born 29 May 1945) is an Indian environmentalist, wildlife biologist, ornithologist, an admirer of naturopathy and the founding Director of the Salim Ali Centre for Ornithology and Natural History. He is currently the chairman of the Salim Ali Foundation.

Vijayan did his post graduation in Zoology at M.S.University of Baroda. He obtained Ph.D. in Field Ornithology in 1976 from the University of Bombay for his work on the Ecological isolation in bulbuls (Class Aves, family Pycnonotidae) with special reference to Pycnonotus cafer (L) and Pycnonotus luteolus (Lesson) at Point Calimere, Tamil Nadu under the guidance of Salim Ali. He is married to Lalitha Vijayan, a noted ornithologist, a Ph D. student of Salim Ali and former scientist of Salim Ali Centre for Ornithology and Natural History. The couple has a son V.V. Robin, an evolutionary biologist.

== Contributions to environmental conservation ==
His report on the Impact of hydroelectric dam on wildlife in Silent Valley was the first scientific basis for the start of the Save Silent Valley movement. The long-term studies conducted under his leadership on the ecology of Keoladeo National Park was instrumental in developing management plans for the park. This study with large-scale bird banding also contributed to the knowledge on migratory birds of Indian subcontinent. Vijayan brought attention of the public and policy makers through his reports on the environmental impacts of the proposed Pathrakadavu hydroelectric project, Pooyamkutty hydroelectric project, Athirapilly hydroelectric project, Aranmula International Airport, genetically modified crops. As the founder Director of the Salim Ali Centre for Ornithology and Natural History, the premier ornithology institute in the country, he led several studies for the conservation of threatened bird of India. He contributed to the Western Ghats Ecology Expert Panel (WGEEP) known as Gadgil Committee as a member which mooted several controversies and agitations across the Western Ghats states. He was instrumental in developing the Pupil's Biodiversity Register for each Grama Panchayath in the state of Kerala. He also developed an organic farming policy for Kerala state during his tenure as the Chairman of the Kerala State Biodiversity Board.

== Positions held ==
Member: Western Ghats Ecology Expert Panel (WGEEP) known as Gadgil Committee, Chairman: Kerala State Biodiversity Board, Director (1991-2005): Salim Ali Centre for Ornithology and Natural History, Officer on Special Duty (1990): Salim Ali Centre for Ornithology and Natural History, Senior Scientist (1987-1990): Bombay Natural History Society, Project Scientist (1981-1987): Bombay Natural History Society, Member (1980-1984): Senate of Calicut University, Member (1979-1983): Kerala State Wildlife Advisory Board, Member (1979 1982): IUCN's Asian Elephant Specialist Group, Wildlife Biologist and Head of Division of Wildlife Biology (1977-1981): Kerala Forest Research Institute, Research Assistant (1976-1977): Kerala Forest Research Institute, Research Associate (1976): Bombay Natural History Society, Visiting Scientist (1975-1976): Indian Institute of Science, Bangalore, Salim Ali-Loke Wan Tho Research Fellow (1972 75): Bombay Natural History Society, Research Assistant (1969 71): Bombay Natural History Society.

== Awards/fellowships ==
- Padmanabhan Memorial award (2010)
- Salim Ali-Loke Wan Tho Research Fellowship (1972): Bombay Natural History Society,

== Bibliography ==
- 2013: Comparison of Gadgil- Kasturirangan Reports, Salim Ali Foundation, Thrissur.
- 2011: Report of the Western Ghats Ecology Panel, Submitted to the Ministry of Environment and Forests, Govt. of India, New Delhi.
- 2005: Status, Distribution and Ecology of the Grey-headed Bulbul Pycnonotus priocephalus in Western Ghats, India. (With Peroth Balakrishnan) Final Report submitted to MoEF. Sálim Ali Centre for Ornithology Natural History, Coimbatore.
- 2004: Patterns in abundance and seasonality of insects in the Siruvani forest of Western Ghats, Nilgiri Biosphere Reserve, Southern India. With Arun P.R The Scientific World Journal, 4, 381–392.
- 1998. Breeding strategies of birds in a moist deciduous forests at Siruvani in the Nilgiri Biosphere Reserve. With Vijayan, L., Venkatraman, C. & Arun, P. R. pp. 179–185 in R.K. Maikhuri, K. S. Rao & R. K. Rai (ed). Biosphere Reserves and Management in India. (Proc. workshop, 11–15 June 1997, Joshimath, U. P) G.B. Pant Institute of Himalayan Environment & Development, Almora, U. P.
- 1995: Breeding ecology of the Bronzewinged (Metopidius indicus) and Pheasant tailed (Hydrophasianus chirurgus) jacanas in Keoladeo National Park, Bharatpur, Rajasthan. With N. K. Ramachandran, J. Bombay Nat. Hist. Soc. 92 (3): 322–334.
- 1994: Distribution and general ecology of the Sarus Crane (Grus antigone) in Keoladeo National Park, Bharatpur, Rajasthan. With N. K. Ramachandran. JBNHS 91 (2): 194–202.
- 1994: Aestivation of turtles in Keoladeo National Park with special reference to Indian Flap shell Turtle (Lissemys punctata). With S. Bhupathy J. Bombay Nat. Hist. Soc. 91 (3):398-402.
- 1993: A study on the wintering ecology of the Barheaded Goose ( Anser indicus) in Keoladeo National Park, Bharatpur, India. pp. 90. With S. Bhupathy &R Mathur. In: Moser, M and J. van Vessem (Eds.). Wetland and waterfowl conservation in south and west Asia. IWRB and AWB.
- 1992. The Socio economics of the villages around Keoladeo National Park, Bharatpur, Rajasthan India. With Azeez, P.A & N.K. Ramachandran. J.Ecology and Environmental Sci.18:1 15.
- 1991: Freshwater turtle fauna of eastern Rajasthan. With S. Bhupathy J.Bombay Nat.Hist.Soc. 88 (1) :118 122.
- 1991. Keoladeo National Park Ecology Study Summary Report 1980 1990. BNHS.1990. Keoladeo National Park Ecology Study 1980 1990. An overview. (Ibid).
- 1991. Freshwater turtle fauna of eastern Rajasthan. With S. Bhupathy J.Bombay Nat. Hist.Soc.88 (1):118 122.
- 1990: Wintering population of the Siberian Crane Grus leucogeranus and its behaviour in Keoladeo National Park, Bharatpur, India. With L.Vijayan.In Proc.of the Asian Crane Congress, Rajkot, Gujarat 1989.
- 1990: Wetlands: in the Encyclopedia of Indian Natural History. Second (revised) edition. Ed. R.E.Hawkins, Bombay Natural History Society.
- 1990: Ecology of the Sarus Crane Grus antigone in Keoladeo National Park, Bharatpur, India. With N.K. Ramachandran.
- 1990. Blotch structure in individual identification of the Indian Python Python molurus molurus and its possible usage in population estimation. With S. Bhupathy J.Bombay Nat. Hist. Soc. 87: 399 404.
- 1990. Ecology of an Indian Artificial Wetland. With N.Armantrout. Proc. of the Second Asian Fisheries Forum held in Tokyo, Japan.
- 1989: Status, distribution and general ecology of the Indian Python Python molurus molurus Linn.in Keoladeo National Park, Bharatpur. J. Bombay Nat. Hist. Soc. 86(3): 381 387.
- 1989: Keoladeo National Park Ecology Study Annual Report 1988. (Ibid).
- 1989. Predation on the Indian Flap shell Turtle (Lissemys punctata) in Keoladeo National Park, Bharatpur, Rajasthan. Pp. 27 33. in: Behaviour ( B. H. Patel ed.) Proc. Natl. Symp. Anim. Behav. Sir P. P. Institute of Science, Bhavnagar. (with S. Bhupathy).
- 1988:Keoladeo National Park Ecology Study Annual Report 1987. (Ibid).
- 1988: On the Fish fauna of Keoladeo National Park, Bharatpur. With C.R.Ajith Kumar. J. Bombay Nat. Hist. Soc. Vol.85(1).
- 1988: Food habits of the Smooth Indian Otter (Lutra perspicillata) in Keoladeo National Park, Bharatpur. With Md.Nayerul Haque. Proc. of the IUCN Otter Symposium held in Bangalore.
- 1987:Bird Banding. in the Encyclopedia of Indian Natural History. Ed. R.E.Hawkins. Bombay Natural History Society.
- 1987: Vertebrate Fauna of Keoladeo National Park, Bharatpur (Technical Bulletin) (Ed). (Ibid).
- 1987: Keoladeo National Park, Bharatpur. Vivekananda Kendra Patrika 12.
- 1987: Bird Migration.in the Encyclopedia of Indian Natural History. Ed. R.E.Hawkins. Bombay Natural History Society.
- 1987: The Proposed Galvalume Plant of General Engineering Works and Keoladeo National Park an impact assessment. October 1987 .(Ibid).
- 1987: Keoladeo National Park Ecology Study. Annual Report 1986. (Ibid).
- 1987: Keoladeo National Park Ecology Study Report for January to June 1987. (Ibid).
- 1986: Specialization in wildlife conservation and biology: research priorities, organization and funding. Proc. of the Symposium on the 'Role of universities in wildlife education and research'. Aligarh Muslim University (in press).
- 1986: On conserving the bird fauna of Indian Wetlands. Proc. Indian Acad. Sci. (Anim. Sci./Plant Sci.) Suppl. November 1986.
- 1986: Keoladeo National Park Ecology Study. Summary Report 1980 1985. With Salim Ali. (Ibid).
- 1985: Status paper on birds. Proc. Third East Asian Bird Protection Conference. Tokyo.
- 1985: Bird Conservation in India. Proc. Third East Asian Bird Protection Conference. Tokyo.
- 1985: Recommendations for Management of Keoladeo National park. With Salim Ali. Bombay Natural History Society.
- 1984: An ecological study in Periyar Tiger Reserve with special reference to wildlife. Research Report. With P.Vijayakumar, N.K. Ramachandran, P.S.Easa and P.V.Balakrishnan. Kerala Forest Research Institute 1983: Hydrobiological (Ecological) Research at Keoladeo National Park. Ist Interim Report. With Salim Ali. Bombay Natural History Society.
- 1983: Conservation in Kerala. Proc. International Seminar on Conservation held in Bombay. Bombay Natural History Society.
- 1982: Habitat preservation and management of the Liontailed Macaque in the wild. Proc. International Seminar on Liontailed Macaque held in Baltimore, USA.
- 1980: Status of Elephants in Periyar Tiger Reserve. In Status of the Asian elephant in the Indian sub continent. Ed. J.C.Daniel.
- 1980: Ecological reconnaissance of Periyar Tiger Reserve with special reference to wi and P.S. Easa. Kerala Forest Research Institute.
- 1980: Breeding biology of bulbuls, Pycnonotus cafer and P.luteolus (Class: Aves; family: Pycnonotidae) with special reference to their ecological isolation. JBNHS. Vol.75. Suppl.
- 1978: Parambikulam Wildlife Sanctuary and its adjacent areas. JBNHS. Vol. 75 (3).
- 1977: Impact of hydroelectric dam on wildlife in Silent Valley. Research Report. With M.Balakrishnan. Kerala Forest Research Institute.
- 1975: Ecological isolation in bulbuls (Class Aves, family Pycnonotidae) with special reference to Pycnonotus cafer (L) and P.luteolus (Lesson) at Point Calimere, Tamil Nadu. Ph.D. Thesis. University of Bombay.
- 1971: Bird Migration Study at Bharatpur Ghana Bird Sanctuary. Mimeographed report, Bombay Natural History Society.
- 1970: Bird Migration Study at Yercaud, Tamil Nadu. Mimeographed report, Bombay Natural History Society.
