= Western Ghats Ecology Expert Panel =

Indian environmental research commission

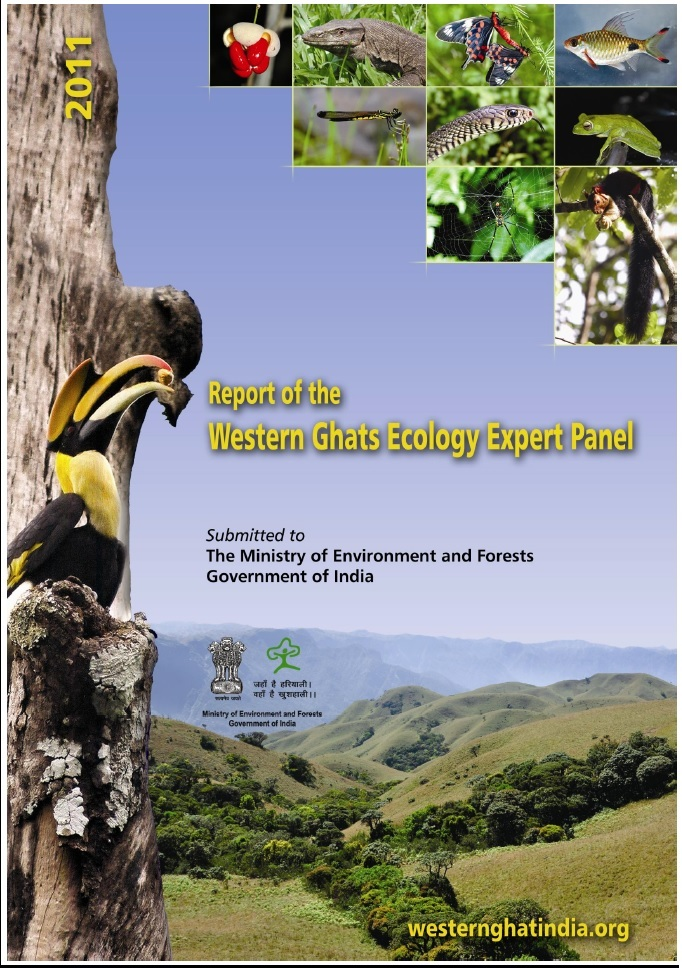
- Gadgil Commission Report
- Abbreviation: WGEEP
- Successor: Kasturirangan Commission
- Location: Environmental Science
- Region served: Western Ghats
- Chairman: Madhav Gadgil

The Western Ghats Ecology Expert Panel (WGEEP), also known as the Gadgil Commission after its chairman Madhav Gadgil, was an environmental research commission appointed by the Ministry of Environment and Forests of India. The commission submitted the report to the Government of India on 31 August 2011. The Expert Panel approached the project through a set of tasks, such as:

1. Compilation of readily available information about Western Ghats
2. Development of Geo-spatial database based on environmental sensitivity (Note: The geospatial datasets restored by OSGEO, contain critical GIS datasets from the WGEEP panel, including boundaries of critical wildlife corridors in the western ghats, biodiversity information, geo regions etc. The ESZ information was missing in the GIS datasets provided by OSGEO. Paani.Earth, a citizen led initiative for conservation of rivers has spatially mapped the ESZ taluks information provided in the WGEEP Report^{.} While there may be errors, our goal is to make this information more accessible) and
3. Consultation with Government bodies and Civil society groups.

Certain sections of people in Kerala, strongly protested the implementation of the report since most of the farmers obtained their livelihood from the hilly regions in Wayanad. During the 20th century, a very large number of people had migrated from southern Kerala and acquired forest land in Wayanad and other areas. The Gadgil Commission report was criticised for being excessively environment-friendly and not in tune with the ground realities.

== Ecology Expert Panel ==
Chairman

- Professor Madhav Gadgil, Ph.D (Harvard University), Former HOD, Centre for Ecological Sciences, Indian Institute of Science, Bangalore.

Members

- Dr. V. S. Vijayan, Ph.D. (University of Mumbai), Founder Director, Salim Ali Centre for Ornithology and Natural History, Coimbatore; Former Chairman, the Kerala State Biodiversity Board.
- Prof. (Ms.) Renee Borges, Centre for Ecological Sciences, Indian Institute of Science, Bangalore.
- Prof. R. Sukumar, Centre for Ecological Sciences, Indian Institute of Science, Bangalore.
- Dr. Ligia Noronha
- Dr. K.N. Ganeshaiah
- Shri. B.J. Krishnan
- Ms Vidya S. Nayak
- Dr. D. K. Subramaniam

Ex-officio members

- Dr. R.V. Varma, Chairman, The Kerala State Biodiversity Board
- Chairman, National Biodiversity Authority(NBA)
- Prof S.P. Gautam, Chairman, Central Pollution Control Board (CPCB)
- Dr. R.R. Navalgund, Director, Space Application Centre (SAC)
- Dr. G.V. Subrahmanyam, Advisor (RE), Ministry of Environment & Forests, Government of India, New Delhi

== Major recommendations of Western Ghats Ecology Expert Panel (WGEEP) ==
- The panel recommended a National-level authority, Western Ghats Ecology Authority (WGEA).
- The Gadgil Commission report was criticised for being too environment-friendly.

The report was considered by UNESCO, which added the 39 serial sites of the Western Ghats on the World Heritage List.

== Kasturirangan Report ==
The Kasturirangan Commission has sought to balance the two concerns of development and environment protection, by watering down the environmental regulation regime proposed by the Western Ghats Ecology Experts Panel’s Gadgil report in 2012. The Kasturirangan report seeks to bring just 37% of the Western Ghats under the Ecologically Sensitive Area (ESA) zones — down from the 64% suggested by the Gadgil report. Dr. V.S. Vijayan, member of the Western Ghats Ecology Expert Panel (WGEEP) said recommendations of the Kasturirangan report are undemocratic and anti-environmental.

A crucial report on Western Ghats prepared by K. Kasturirangan-led high-level working group (HLWG) has recommended prohibition on development activities in 60,000 km^{2} ecologically sensitive area spread over Gujarat, Karnataka, Maharashtra, Goa, Kerala and Tamil Nadu.

The 10-member panel, constituted to examine the Western Ghats ecology expert panel report prepared under the leadership of environmentalist Madhav Gadgil, has also moved away from the suggestions of the Gadgil panel.

The Gadgil panel had recommended a blanket approach consisting of guidelines for sector-wise activities, which could be permitted in the ecologically sensitive zones.

=== Livelihood options ===
"Environmentally sound development cannot preclude livelihood and economic options for this region... The answer (to the question of how to manage and conserve the Ghats) will not lie in removing these economic options, but in providing better incentives to move them towards greener and more sustainable practices," the HLWG report says.

The panel submitted the report to Environment Minister Jayanthi Natarajan.

=== Prohibitory regime ===
Roughly 37 per cent of the total area defined as the boundary of the Western Ghats is ecologically sensitive. Over this area of some 60,000 km^{2}, spread over the States of Gujarat, Maharashtra, Goa, Karnataka, Kerala and Tamil Nadu, the working group has recommended a prohibitory regime on those activities with maximum interventionist and destructive impact on the environment, the panel says in its report.

The Working Group was constituted to advise the government on the recommendations of an earlier report of ecologist Madhav Gadgil-led "Western Ghats Ecology Expert Panel" (WGEEP).

The WGEEP had recommended 64% of Western Ghats to be declared as an ecologically sensitive area. It had suggested three levels of categorization where regulatory measures for protection would be imposed and had recommended the establishment of the Western Ghats Ecology Authority for management of the Ghats.

The 10-member Working Group, headed by Planning Commission member Kasturirangan, has environmental experts and other professionals as its members.

"The Western Ghats is a biological treasure trove that is endangered, and it needs to be protected and regenerated, indeed celebrated for its enormous wealth of endemic species and natural beauty", the report says.

Natarajan said that the recommendations would be looked into urgently so that action can be taken to address these challenges.

Kasturirangan said, "The message of this report is serious, alarming and urgent. It is imperative that we protect, manage and regenerate the lands now remaining in the Western Ghats as biologically rich, diverse, natural landscapes".

== See also ==
- Brundtland Commission
- Sustainability
- Sustainable development
