= K. Sivadasan Nair =

Indian politician (born 1949)

Member of the Kerala Legislative Assembly
- In office 2006 – 2011
- Preceded by: K.K.Nair
- Succeeded by: Constituency Abolished
- Constituency: Pathanamthitta

Member of the Kerala Legislative Assembly
- In office 2011 – 2016
- Preceded by: K. C. Rajagopalan
- Succeeded by: Veena George
- Constituency: Aranmula

Personal details
- Born: 2 March 1949 (age 77) Aranmula, Kingdom of Travancore, Dominion of India (present day Pathanamthitta, Kerala, India)
- Party: Indian National Congress
- Spouse: P. R. Lalithamma
- Children: 2

K. Sivadasan Nair (born 2 March 1949) is an Indian politician and was a member in the 12th and 13th Kerala Legislative Assembly from Pathanamthitta and Aranmula Assembly Constituencies respectively. He belongs to the Indian National Congress.

== Positions held ==
- President Kerala Students Union Unit, N.S.S. College, Pandalam
- Chairman, Pandalam N.S.S. College Union, University College Union, Thiruvananthapuram and Law Academy, Thiruvananthapuram
- President, Kerala University Union
- Vice President, Alappuzha District K.S.U. Committee
- Member, K.S.U. State Committee, Youth Congress State Committee, Aranmula Grama Panchayat
- Chairman, National Federation of Agricultural and Rural Development Banks, Mumbai
- President, Kerala State Co-operative Agricultural and Rural Development Bank
- Director, K.F.C., P.D.C.B., Pathanamthitta
- D.C.C. President, Pathanamthitta

== Personal life ==
He was born at Aranmula on 2 March 1949. His father is Kesava Pillai and mother is Ammukkutty Amma. He has a master's degree in arts and bachelor's degree in law. He is a lawyer by profession. He is married to Prof. P. R. Lalithamma and has two daughters.
