= Kummanam Rajasekharan =

Former Governor of Mizoram

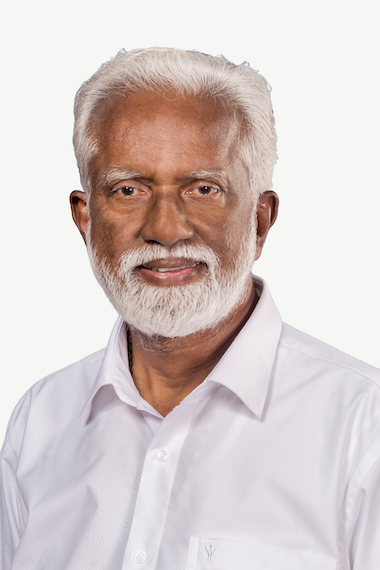

14th Governor of Mizoram
- In office 29 May 2018 – 8 March 2019
- Chief Minister: Lal Thanhawla; Zoramthanga
- Preceded by: Nirbhay Sharma
- Succeeded by: Jagdish Mukhi

State President of Bharatiya Janata Party, Kerala
- In office 19 December 2015 – 25 May 2018
- Preceded by: V. Muraleedharan
- Succeeded by: P. S. Sreedharan Pillai

Personal details
- Born: 23 December 1952 (age 73) Kummanam, Kottayam, Kerala
- Party: Bharatiya Janata Party
- Occupation: Politician
- Website: kummanamrajasekharan.in

Kummanam Rajasekharan (born 23 December 1952) is an Indian politician from Keralam who has served as the BJP Kerala Chief and also the former governor of Mizoram (2018–2019). He began his political career as an activist of Rashtriya Swayamsevak Sangh (RSS) and Sangh Parivar in Kerala in 1970. From 2015 to 2018, he was the state president of Bharatiya Janata Party (BJP) in Kerala. He is the first BJP leader from Kerala to become the head of a state. He previously served as the administrative committee member of the Sree Padmanabha Swamy Temple Devaswom in Thiruvananthapuram, Kerala. He actively contested for BJP in various Loksabha and assembly elections in Kerala.. Under his leadership in 2016 BJP won their first ever MLA seat in the Kerala Legislative Assembly election.

Rajasekharan worked as a journalist between 1974 and 1976, before joining the Food Corporation of India. He became a high-ranking official of the Kerala Vishva Hindu Parishad (VHP) during that time. In 1987, he resigned to become a full-time Sangh Parivar worker, while being instrumental in spearheading Kerala's VHP, Kshetra Samrakshana Samiti, Balasadanams, and Ekal Vidyalayas. Rajasekharan has been the secretary of Hindu Aikya Vedi, Sabarimala Ayyappa Seva Samajam, general-secretary and chairman of Janmabhumi.

In 2019, he was conferred with a Doctor of Letters degree by the Shri Jagdishprasad Jhabrmal Tibrewala University for honouring his contributions to the field of social work.. He is one of the Party's National Executive Members from Keralam.He is also the Chief Parton of the famous Jatayupara Sreerama Temple in kollam.

== Early life ==
Rajasekharan was born on 23 December 1952 to Adv V. K. Ramakrishna Pillai and P. Parukkutty Amma in Kummanam village of Kottayam district, Kerala, India. He completed his school education from Government Upper Primary School in Kummanam and N.S.S. High School in Kottayam. He completed pre-degree education from Baselius College, Kottayam and later joined CMS College Kottayam and graduated with a Bachelor of Science in Botany. He then took a postgraduate diploma in journalism and began a career in journalism as sub-editor in various newspapers.

== Professional career ==
In 1974, Rajasekharan joined Deepika news-daily as sub-editor, embarking on a career in journalism. He later worked in different news-dailies such as Rastravaartha, Keraladesam, Kerala Bhooshanam and Kerala Dwani. In 1976, he took a break from journalism and joined Food Corporation of India (FCI) as a government servant. In 1979, he became Kottayam district Secretary of Vishva Hindu Parishad (VHP) and later became its state Joint Secretary in 1981. He resigned the job from FCI in 1987 and became a pracharak (full-time worker) in Rashtriya Swayamsevak Sangh (RSS).

== Political career ==
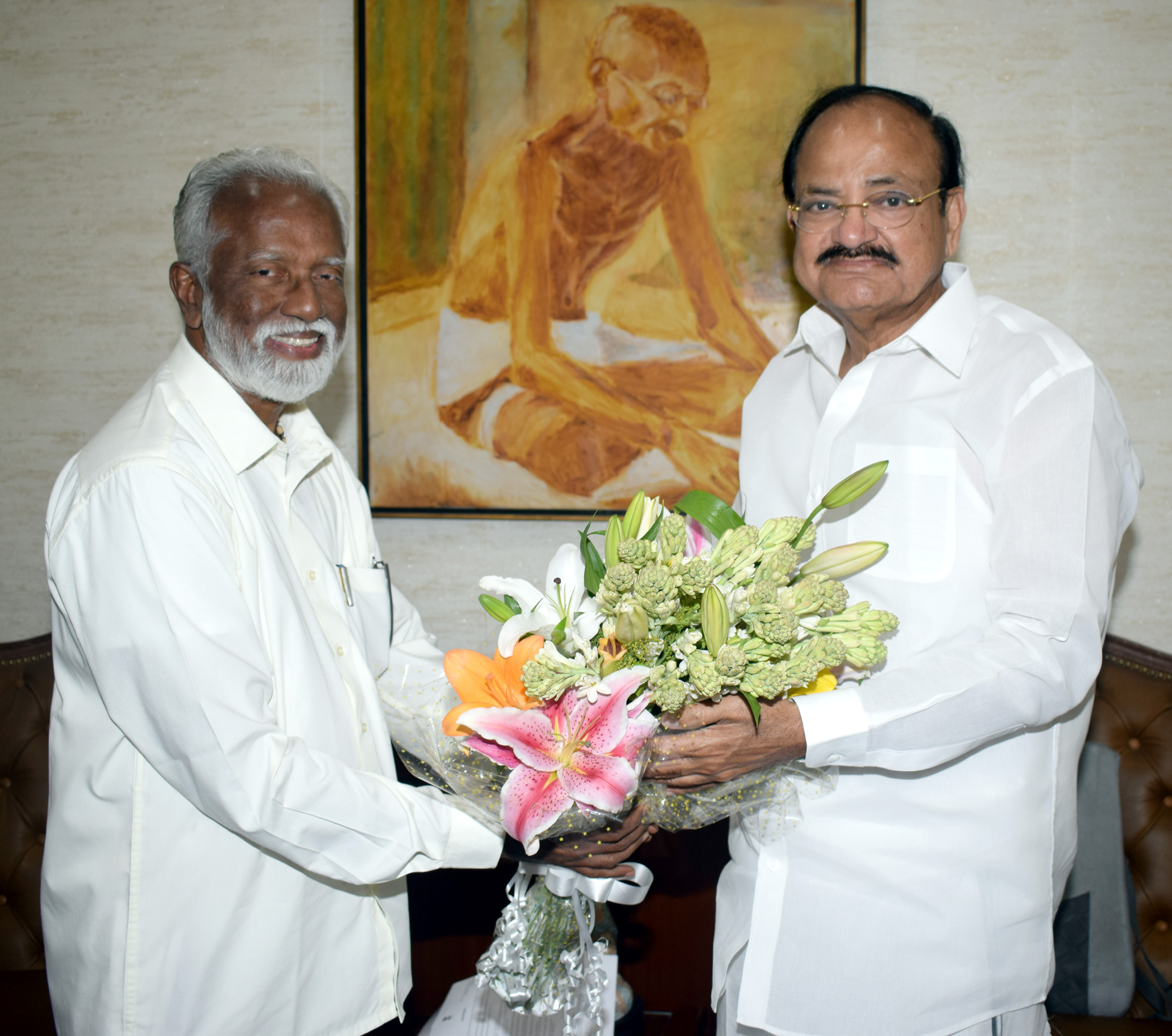
Kummanam Rajasekharan with Venkaiah Naidu

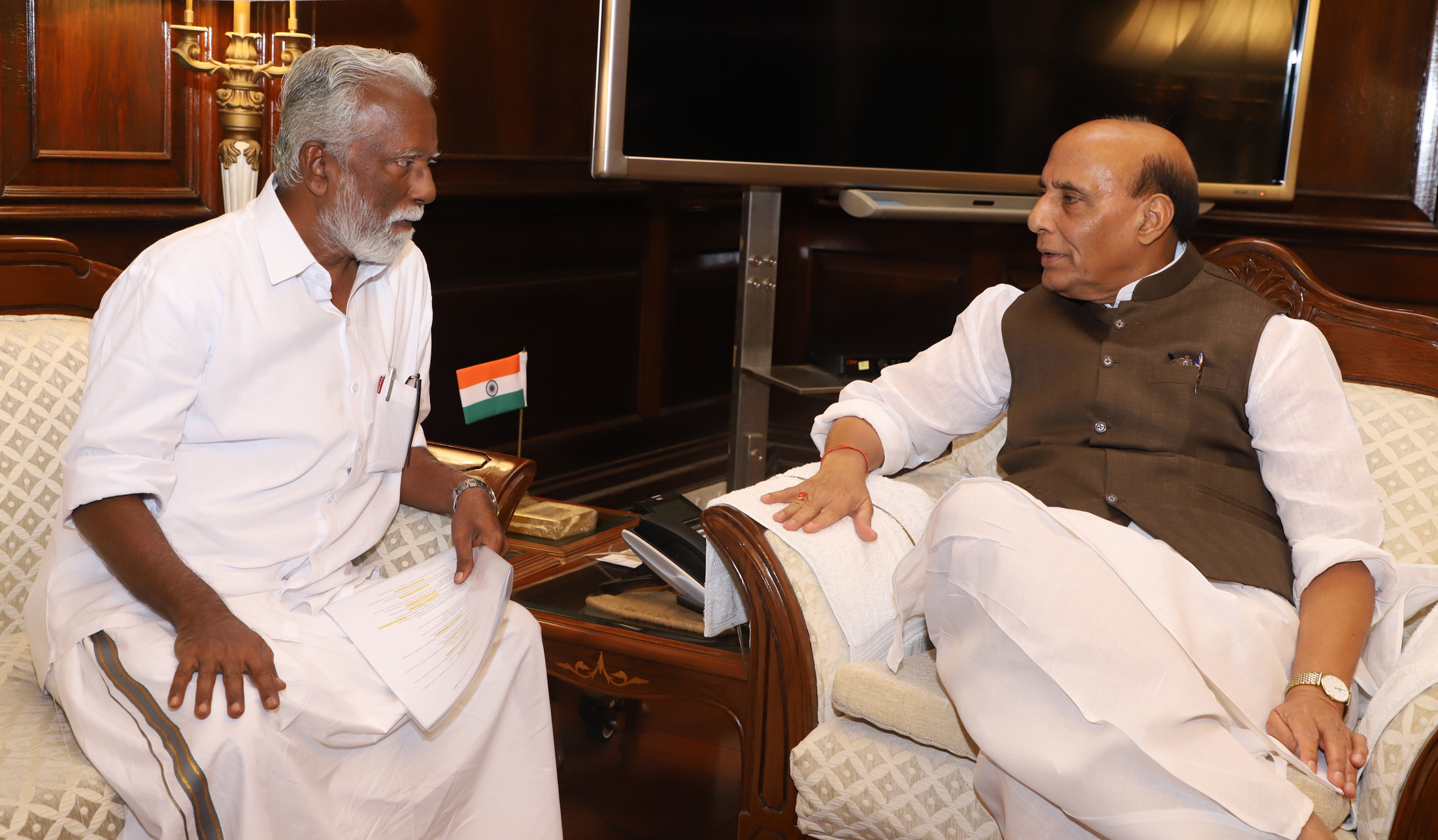
Kummanam Rajasekharan with Rajnath Singh

He came into contact with the Rashtriya Swayamsevak Sangh during his student days. In 1979, he became the district-secretary of Vishwa Hindu Parishad and later was associated with many Hindu organisations in Kerala in various capacities.

In 1983, he participated in the movement against 'Nilakkal land encroachment' and worked for 'Paliyam declaration' pronounced by prominent Hindu religious scholars. In 2012, he participated in the agitation against KGS Aranmula International Airport. He was the Chief Patron of Aranmula Heritage Village Action Council which protested against this airport.

- In 1981, became State Joint-Secretary of Vishwa Hindu Parishad.
- In 1983, was appointed General-Convener of Nilakkal Action Council and led the mass agitation against the encroachment in Nilakkal.
- In 1985, became General-Secretary of Hindu Munnani (Hindu Front)
- In 1987, he contested from Thiruvananthapuram constituency as Hindu Munnani candidate.
- In 1988, he was appointed General-Secretary of Guruvayoor Temple Action Council and led agitation to take out Jacob Thampi from managing committee of Guruvayoor Temple.
- In 1989, was appointed Editor of Janmabhumi daily, Kochi.
- In 1992, was designated General-Convenor of Hindu Aikya Vedi.
- In 1996, was appointed Organising-Secretary of Vishwa Hindu Parishad
- In 1998, was appointed General-Convener of Sivagiri Samara Sahaya Samithi to assist the agitations led by Swami Prakashananda protesting against his removal from presidency of Sivagiri Madom.
- In 2003, led a mass agitation against the Marad massacre.
- In 2007, was designated as Managing Director of Janmabhumi daily.
- In 2009, was selected as General-Secretary of Sabarimala Ayyappa Seva Samajam.
- In 2010, was appointed General-Secretary of Hindu Aikya Vedi.
- In 2011, was appointed Chairman, Janamabhumi daily.
- In 2012, was appointed Chief Patron (Mukhya Rakshadhikari) of Aranmula Heritage Village Action Council.
- In 2015, was appointed President, BJP Kerala State Unit from 18 December.
- In 2018, was appointed the Governor of Mizoram on May 25. He resigned from the post on 8 March 2019.
- In 2019, contested Lok Sabha elections 2019 from Thiruvananthapuram constituency against former Union minister Shashi Tharoor and former state minister C. Divakaran. Tharoor emerged the winner with a margin of 99,989 votes over Rajasekharan. He secured over 3.25 lakhs.
- In October 2020, he was chosen as the representative of the Central Government in the Administrative Committee of Sree Padmanabha Swamy Temple in Thiruvananthapuram.
- He unsuccessfully contested the 2021 Kerala State Legislative Assembly election from Nemom assembly constituency as the BJP Candidate. This seat was the BJP's only seat in the 2016 elections.
- In 2023 he elected as the Chief Parton of the Governing Body of the famous Jatayupara Sreerama Temple Trust in Kollam, Keralam.
- He again unsuccessfully contested from Aranmula constituency in the 2026 Kerala state assembly elections.
- Again appointed as the Chairman of the Aranmula Heritage trust, an organization for protecting and preserving the rich culture of the famous Aranmula village in Pathanamthitta district.

=== Marad massacre ===
On the evening of 2 May 2003, a group of fishermen were attacked by a Muslim mob armed with swords and deadly weapons with the help of local political support. Nine Hindus were killed in that attack. Many were seriously wounded. Mass protests were carried out by various Hindu organisations under the banner of the Hindu Aikya Vedi, against the violence. Kerala government decided to announce compensation for victims' families and ordered a judicial inquiry into the incident. As the General-Secretary of Hindu Aikya Vedi, RSS, Kummanam Rajasekharan helped the victims of the massacre.

== Controversies ==
In December 2015, Kummanam Rajasekharan made a communal statement while attending a public function that, "Vendors from other religions shouldn't be allowed in temple premises and temple committees could decide on letting vendors from other religions operate at temple premises". This led to widespread protest in the state. The Government of Kerala as well as opposition parties opposed this statement and accused that Kummanam is trying to create communal division and transform the temples to RSS offices.

In May 2017, Kummanam circulated a video in his social media account which claimed CPI(M) men celebrating the murder of an RSS worker. The video turned out to be a fake and a police case was registered against him.

In June 2018, just days after Kummanam was sworn in as the Governor of Mizoram, a campaign to remove him from the post was reportedly started by the People's Representation for Identity and Status of Mizoram (PRISM), an anti-corruption organisation turned political party. PRISM appealed to churches and political parties to expel Rajasekharan from the state, the organisation called him an "anti-secular" and a "radical Hindu leader" in the appeal letter.

In October 2020, the Aranmula police filed a lawsuit against Kummanam, among several others, for allegedly defrauding an individual of several lakh rupees. According to the prosecution, on the premise of making him a collaborator in a factory-unit to be established in Palakkad, the accused allegedly took ₹36 lakh from the victim.

Political offices
Preceded by Lt General (Retd) Nirbhay Sharma	Governor of Mizoram; 29 May 2018 - 8 March 2019	Succeeded by Jagdish Mukhi
