= Veena George =

Indian politician and journalist (born 1976)

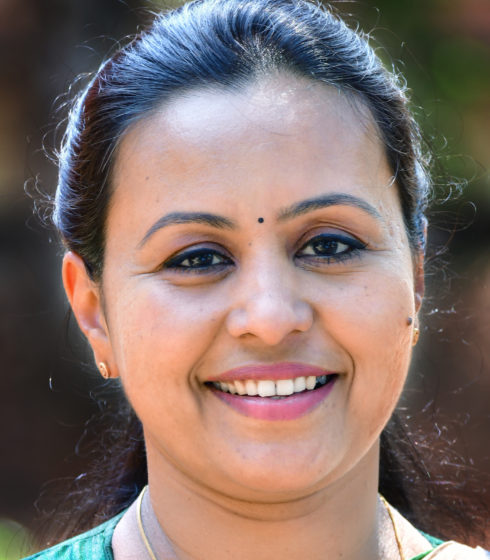

Minister for Health and Woman and Child Development, Government of Kerala
- In office 20 May 2021 – 23 May 2026
- Chief Minister: Pinarayi Vijayan
- Departments: Health and Family Welfare; Ayush; Women and Child Development
- Preceded by: K. K. Shailaja
- Succeeded by: Bindu Krishna (Woman and Child Development); K. Muraleedharan (Health and Family Welfare)

Member of Kerala Legislative Assembly
- In office 2 June 2016 – 23 May 2026
- Preceded by: K. Sivadasan Nair
- Succeeded by: Abin Varkey
- Constituency: Aranmula

Personal details
- Born: 3 August 1976 (age 50) Thiruvananthapuram, Kerala, India
- Party: Communist Party of India (Marxist)
- Spouse: George Joseph
- Children: 2
- Education: Government College for Women, Thiruvananthapuram, University of Kerala (B.Sc., M.Sc., B.Ed.)

Veena George (born 3 August 1976) is an Indian politician and former journalist who served as the minister for health and woman and child development in the Government of Kerala from 2021 till 2026. She previously represented the Aranmula Assembly constituency in the 14th and 15th Kerala Legislative Assembly. A member of the Communist Party of India (Marxist), Veena worked with major Malayalam news channels for over 16 years prior to joining politics. She was also the first female executive editor among regional Malayalam news channels.

== Early life and career ==
Veena George was born in Thiruvananthapuram, Kerala, on 3 August 1976 to Adv. P. E. Kuriakose and Rosamma Kuriakose in a Malankara Orthodox Christian family. She completed her schooling at Mount Bethany High School in Pathanamthitta. She then pursued a B.Sc. and M.Sc. in Physics from the Government College for Women, Thiruvananthapuram, and completed her B.Ed. as a University of Kerala rank holder.

Veena taught Physics as a lecturer at Catholicate College, Pathanamthitta, for one year before taking up journalism as her career choice. She then joined Kairali TV as a journalist trainee and had a 16-year-long successful career with prominent Malayalam news channels. In 2015, she took charge as the executive editor of the Malayalam news channel TV New and became the first woman to do so. She is married to Dr. George Joseph, a higher secondary school teacher.

== Career ==
=== Television career ===
Veena George began her career at Kairali TV as a journalist trainee, later she joined Manorama News as a news anchor and also presented morning shows and special international news programmes. Later she was associated with Malayalam news channels Indiavision, Reporter TV in prominent roles and joined TV New in the role of executive editor in 2015.

=== Political career ===
She was a Students' Federation of India (SFI) activist in her college days. She contested elections for the first time when the CPI (M) fielded her from an INC-held Aranmula seat in the 2016 assembly polls. She defeated senior INC leader K. Sivadasan Nair with a margin of 7,646 votes.

In the 2019 Indian general election, Veena contested from the Pathanamthitta Lok Sabha constituency and came second in a fierce tri-cornered battle with the BJP and INC.

She retained her seat in the 2021 assembly elections with an increased margin of 19,003 votes. On 20 May 2021, she was sworn in as a cabinet minister in the Left Democratic Front government, which became the first administration in Kerala to be re-elected since the 1977 election.

On 21 May 2021, she took charge as the Minister for Health and Family Welfare, succeeding renowned CPI (M) leader K. K. Shailaja. On 4 May 2026, she demitted office as the Minister for Health and Family Welfare following the resignation of the Second Pinarayi Vijayan ministry after the defeat in the 2026 Kerala Legislative Assembly election.

=== Election candidature history ===
==== Parliament election candidature history ====
Year	Constituency	Opponent	Result	Margin
2019	Pathanamthitta	Anto Antony (INC)	lost	44243

==== Assembly election candidature history ====
Year	Constituency	Opponent	Result	Margin
2016	Aranmula	Adv. K. Sivadasan Nair (INC)	win	7646
2021	Aranmula	Adv. K. Sivadasan Nair (INC)	win	19000
2026	Aranmula	Abin Varkey (INC)	Lost	18985

== Controversies and criticism ==
=== Protest-related injury controversy (2026) ===
In February 2026, Veena George, Minister for Health and Family Welfare of Kerala, was reportedly injured during a protest by members of the Kerala Students Union (KSU) at Kannur railway station. The incident occurred when protesters clashed with police, during which she sustained injuries to her neck and hand.

The incident led to a political dispute between the ruling Communist Party of India (Marxist) (CPI(M)) and the opposition Indian National Congress and its student wing, the KSU. Leaders of the ruling party described the episode as a violent attack on a sitting minister. In contrast, opposition leaders disputed this characterization, stating that available visuals did not indicate any direct physical assault and alleging that the extent of the injury had been exaggerated.

The controversy intensified following satirical protests by members of the KSU, including the symbolic presentation of a "Best Actress" award to the minister.

Several KSU members were arrested in connection with the protest. In subsequent legal proceedings, a sessions court granted bail to the accused, noting the absence of evidence indicating the use of weapons during the protest.

The incident received widespread media coverage and escalated into a broader political confrontation between the ruling and opposition alliances in the state.

=== Healthcare administration and negligence cases ===
The protest against the minister was linked to public and political criticism over alleged medical negligence incidents in government hospitals. These included cases that raised concerns regarding patient safety and hospital oversight, prompting protests by opposition groups.

Opposition leaders accused the government of administrative lapses and demanded accountability, while the government maintained that such incidents were isolated and initiated inquiries and disciplinary actions.

=== Public criticism and political response ===
The controversy contributed to sustained criticism from opposition parties and political groups, and led to widespread debate in the media and on social platforms. Analysts noted that the episode intensified political tensions and public discourse regarding governance of the health sector.

Supporters of the government, however, argued that Kerala's public healthcare system continues to perform strongly on national indicators and that many challenges are structural in nature rather than attributable to a single office-holder.

=== Political context ===
These events occurred within the broader political rivalry in Kerala between the CPI(M)-led Left Democratic Front and the Congress-led United Democratic Front, where political confrontations are often amplified during periods of heightened public and electoral activity.
