= Edasserimala =

Village in Pathanamthitta District, Kerala, India

Edasserimala is a village in Aranmula, Pathanamthitta, India.

Some known temples in Edaserimala is Kadagal Devi temple, Kanakakkunnu Mahadevar temple and Pallimukkom Devi temple. Eddaserimala is also one of the host of Uthrathadhi Valam kali. Other places of interest are Eddaserimala Palliyodam and Eddaserimala East Palliyodam vellapura (the boat house), Vasthu vidhya gurukulam, Veera Jawan Smarakam, and Satra Kadvu which is also the finishing point of world-famous Snake boat race.
