= Religious thinkers of India =

India has been home to a large number of religious thinkers and spiritualists. The most important of such religious thinkers include Buddha, Guru Nanak, and Mahavira. Buddha and Guru Nanak were the founders of the Buddhist and Sikh religions respectively. Mahavira was the last Jain Tirthankara.

== Hinduisum social reformers ==
- Adi Shankaracharya
- Ramanujacharya
- Madhvacharya
- Vedanta Desika
- Manavala Mamuni
- Ayya Vaikundar – Initiator of Ayyavazhi; Social reformer.
- Chaitanya Mahaprabhu
- Ramakrishna
- Ram Mohan Roy – Initiator of the Brahmo Samaj movement, which aimed at developing a universal religion in the nineteenth century.
- Swami Dayananda – Founder of the Arya Samaj.
- Swami Vivekananda – A disciple of Ramakrishna, he started the Ramakrishna Mission, a monastic movement with great stress on humanitarian work.
- Sri Aurobindo – Yoga guru, who proposed yogic tantras to attain divine bliss.
- Jagadguru Swami Sathyananda Saraswathi–Hindu Spiritual teacher, authentic authority on Hinduism, pioneer in Ram Janmabhumi movement and founder of Hindu Aikya Vedi
- Sri Narayana Guru – Social reformer who worked for the upliftment of people from the lower caste in Kerala.

Other important figures include Basava, Rabindranath Tagore, Mahatma Gandhi, Vinayak Damodar Savarkar and others

== Islam ==
- Moinuddin Chishti – founder of the Chishti Order in India.
- Shah Waliullah Dehlawi– important scholar of Islamic aqidah and fiqh, best known for his work in tasawwuf, tafsir, Hadith studies, and Islamic law.
- Nizamuddin Auliya– important scholar and Sufi murshid of the Chishti Order
- Fariduddin Ganjshakar – Another Sufi murshid of the Chishti Order whose teachings have also been included in Sikhism.
- Amir Khusro – Sufi poet, and disciple of Nizamuddin Auliya, he is credited with being the founder of both Hindustani classical music and Qawwali (the devotional music of the Sufis).
- Ahmad Sirhindi – a prominent propagator of the Naqshbandi Sufi order in India.
- Syed Ahmed Khan
- Mirza Ghulam Ahmad
- Muhammad Iqbal
- Ahmed Raza Khan Barelvi– important Islamic scholar, Sufi, jurist, and theologian; founder of the Barelvi movement.
- Malik Deenar– one of the first known propagators of Islam in India; is buried in Thalangara, Kerala.

Other important figures include Ali Hujwiri, the five founders of the Deobandi movement, and Akbar. Additionally, the Imamate of the Nizari Ismaili community is based in Gujarat (although the current Agha Khan lives in Britain).

== Zoroastrianism ==
- Dadabhai Naoroji - Also regarded as one of the most important freedom fighter of the country.

== Other important thinkers ==
The Sikh Gurus undoubtedly were very important in propounding the tenets of Sikhism. Thomas, one of the twelve disciples of Jesus, is believed to have preached and finally died in India. Saint Francis Xavier also developed a Jesuit missionary method that left a significant impression upon the missionary history of India.

Jesus of Nazareth may have had spiritual training or influences from South Asian spiritual thought. A school of thought believes Jesus escaped the Roman empire to Kashmir.

== See also ==
- Religion in India
