= Kozhippalam =

- village
- Location in Kerala, India Kozhippalam (India)
- Coordinates: 9°19′49″N 76°40′17″E
- Country: India
- State: Kerala
- District: Pathanamthitta

Languages
  - Official: Malayalam, English
- Time zone: UTC+5:30 (IST)
- PIN: 689531
- Telephone code: 0468-231
- Vehicle registration: KL-
- Nearest city: Kozhanchery, Chenganoor (Alappuzha district)
- Vidhan Sabha constituency: Aranmula constituency

Kozhippalam is a village near Aranmula in the Pathanamthitta district of Kerala, India. It lies on the bank of the Pamba river, about 1 kilometre (0.62 mi) from Aranmula on the Chengannur–Kozhencherry road, along the route used for the annual Aranmula Boat Race. In 2018, floods on the Pamba exposed a terracotta archaeological site on the riverbank at the village.

== Archaeological find ==
After the 2018 Kerala floods, terracotta figurines were exposed on the bank of the Pamba at Kozhippalam. Examined by the Kerala Department of Archaeology, the finds included figures of mother goddesses (Sapta Matrika), naga (serpent) idols and men; thermoluminescence and iconographic studies were expected to establish their age.
