= Aranmula Assembly constituency =

Constituency of the Kerala legislative assembly in India

Coordinates: 9.33°N 76.69°E

Aranmula
- Constituency No. 113 for the Kerala Legislative Assembly
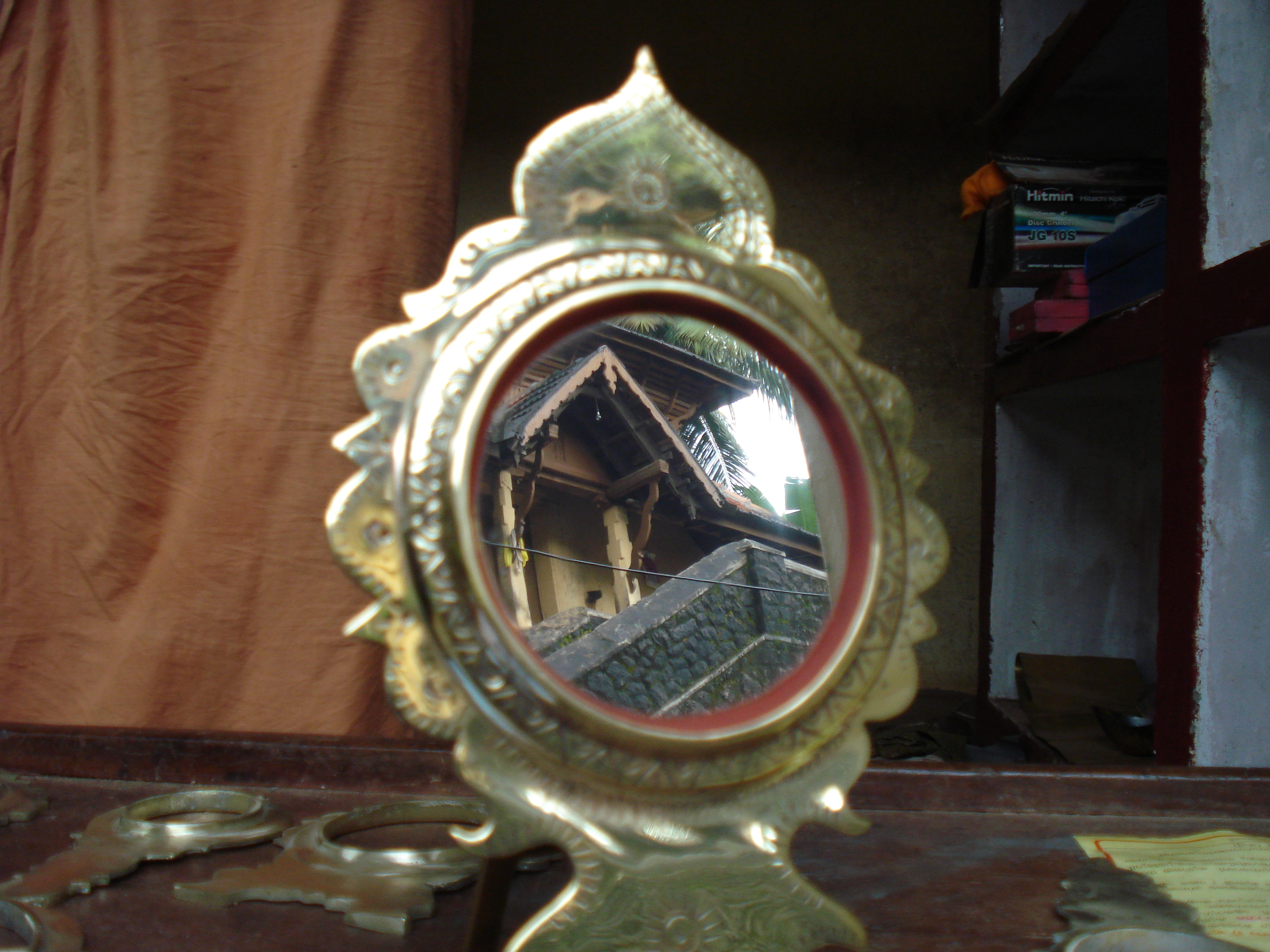
- The centre of the Aranmula kannadi is located in Aranmula Assembly constituency.

Constituency details
- Country: India
- Region: South India
- State: Kerala
- District: Pathanamthitta
- Established: 1957
- Total electors: 2,37,351 (2021)
- Reservation: None

Member of Legislative Assembly
- 16th Kerala Legislative Assembly
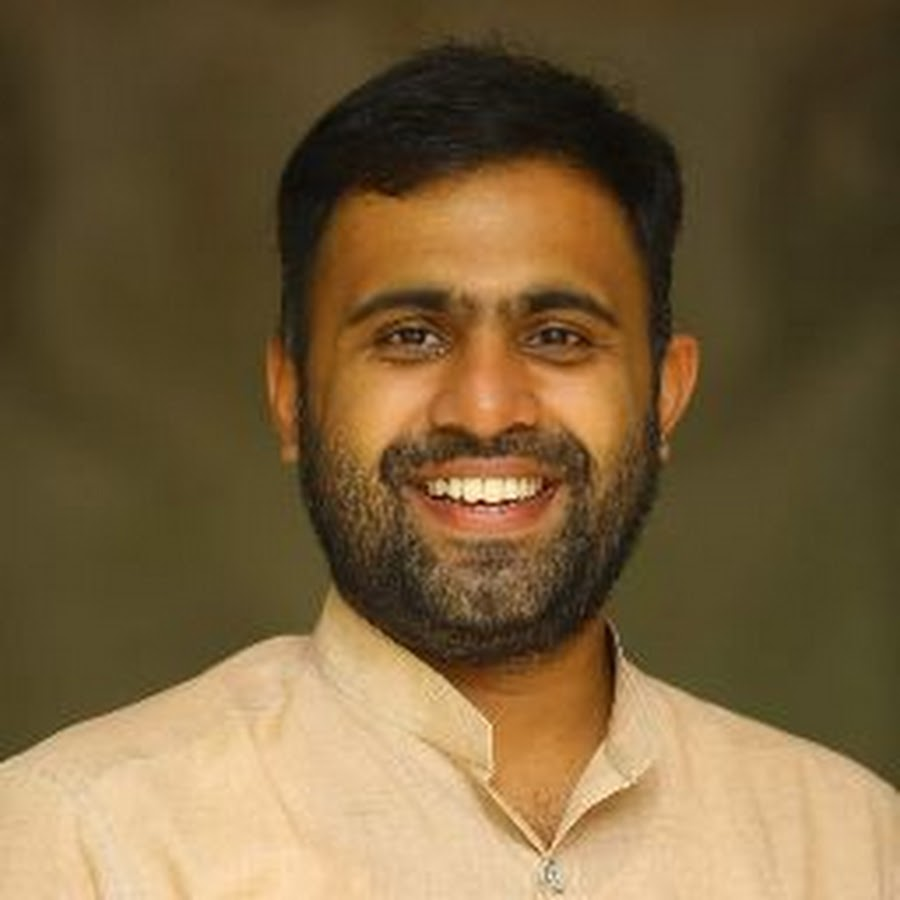
- Incumbent Abin Varkey
- Party: Indian National Congress
- Alliance: UDF
- Elected year: 2026

Aranmula State assembly constituency is one of the 140 state legislative assembly constituencies in Kerala in southern India. It is also one of the seven state legislative assembly constituencies included in Pathanamthitta Lok Sabha constituency. As of the 2026 assembly elections, the current MLA is Adv Abin Varkey of the Indian National Congress.

== Local self-governed segments ==
Aranmula Assembly constituency is composed of the following local self-governed segments:

Name	Status (Grama panchayat/Municipality)	Taluk
Pathanamthitta	Municipality	Kozhencherry
Aranmula	Grama panchayat	Kozhencherry
Chenneerkara	Grama panchayat	Kozhencherry
Elanthoor	Grama panchayat	Kozhencherry
Kozhencherry	Grama panchayat	Kozhencherry
Kulanada	Grama panchayat	Kozhencherry
Mallappuzhassery	Grama panchayat	Kozhencherry
Mezhuveli	Grama panchayat	Kozhencherry
Naranganam	Grama panchayat	Kozhencherry
Omalloor	Grama panchayat	Kozhencherry
Eraviperoor	Grama panchayat	Thiruvalla
Koipuram	Grama panchayat	Thiruvalla
Thottapuzhassery	Grama panchayat	Thiruvalla

== Members of Legislative Assembly ==
The following list contains all members of Kerala Legislative Assembly who have represented Aranmula Assembly constituency during the period of various assemblies:

Key

INC CPI(M) Independent NDP SSP

Election	Niyama Sabha	Member	Party	Tenure
1957	1st	K. Gopinathan Pillai	INC	1957 – 1960
1960	2nd	K. Gopinathan Pillai	INC	1960 – 1965
1967	3rd	P. N. Chandrasenan	SSP	1967 – 1970
1970	4th	P. N. Chandrasenan	Independent	1970 – 1977
1977	5th	M. K. Hemachandran	INC	1977 – 1980
1980	6th	K. K. Sreenivasan	INC	1980 – 1982
1982	7th	K. K. Sreenivasan	INC	1982 – 1987
1987	8th	K. K. Sreenivasan	INC	1987 – 1991
1991	9th	R. Ramachandran Nair	NDP	1991 – 1996
1996	10th	Kadammanitta Ramakrishnan	LDF	1996 – 2001
2001	11th	Malethu Saraladevi	INC	2001 – 2006
2006	12th	K. C. Rajagopalan	CPI(M)	2006 – 2011
2011	13th	K. Sivadasan Nair	INC	2011 – 2016
2016	14th	Veena George	CPI(M)	2016 – 2021
2021	15th	Veena George	CPI(M)	2021 – 2026
2026	16th	Abin Varkey	INC	2026 – 2030

== Election results ==
Percentage change (±%) denotes the change in the number of votes from the immediate previous election.

=== 2026 ===
2026 Kerala Legislative Assembly election: Aranmula
Party	Candidate	Votes	%	±%
INC	Abin Varkey	70,083	44.51	▲9.95
CPI(M)	Veena George	51,098	32.45	▼13.85
BJP	Kummanam Rajasekharan	34,983	22.22	▲4.24
NOTA	None of the above	615	0.39	
Margin of victory		18,985		
Turnout		1,57,450		
INC gain from CPI(M)		Swing		

Local body / category	No. of booths	UDF	LDF	NDA	Leading alliance	Lead
Eraviperoor	16	4,570	3,118	1,946	UDF	1,452
Koipuram	34	8,866	6,417	4,909	UDF	2,449
Thottapuzhassery	22	4,369	3,168	2,042	UDF	1,201
Kozhencherry	10	2,524	1,370	1,081	UDF	1,154
Aranmula	32	6,509	6,028	5,149	UDF	481
Mallappuzhassery	11	2,589	1,954	1,429	UDF	635
Naranganam	16	3,846	2,978	2,646	UDF	868
Elanthoor	15	4,105	2,837	1,890	UDF	1,268
Kulanada	30	7,149	5,398	3,833	UDF	1,751
Mezhuveli	12	3,051	2,799	1,065	UDF	252
Chenneerkara	21	5,423	4,100	2,089	UDF	1,323
Omalloor	16	3,905	2,885	2,718	UDF	1,020
Pathanamthitta Municipality	37	11,283	7,082	3,465	UDF	4,201
Total EVM	272	68,189	50,134	34,262	UDF	18,055
Postal ballot	—	1,894	964	721	UDF	930
Total votes	—	70,083	51,098	34,983	UDF	18,985

=== 2021 ===
There were 2,37,351 registered voters in Aranmula Constituency for the 2021 Kerala Assembly election.

2021 Kerala Legislative Assembly election: Aranmula
Party	Candidate	Votes	%	±%
CPI(M)	Veena George	74,950	46.3	▲6.33
INC	K. Sivadasan Nair	55,947	34.56	▼0.67
BJP	Biju Mathew	29,099	17.98	▼5.5
Independent	Sivadasan Nair S/o Raghavan Nair	629	0.39	N/A
NOTA	None of the above	575	0.36	N/A
Margin of victory		19,003	11.74	▲7
Turnout		1,61,866	68.19	▼2.63
CPI(M) hold		Swing	▲6.33	

=== 2016 ===
There were 2,27,943 registered voters in Aranmula Constituency for the 2016 Kerala Assembly election.

2016 Kerala Legislative Assembly election: Aranmula
Party	Candidate	Votes	%	±%
CPI(M)	Veena George	64,523	39.97	▼2.93
INC	K. Sivadasan Nair	56,877	35.23	▼12.46
BJP	M. T. Ramesh	37,906	23.48	▲15.96
NOTA	None of the above	569	0.35	N/A
BSP	T. Amrithakumar	548	0.34	▼0.19
SP	Sreekanth M. Vallakkottu	252	0.16	N/A
Independent	Chandran	249	0.15	N/A
SUCI(C)	Anil Kumar K. G.	217	0.13	N/A
PDP	Habeeb Rahman	187	0.12	N/A
Independent	Shaji Mezhuveli	104	0.06	N/A
Margin of victory		7,646	4.74	▼0.05
Turnout		1,61,432	70.82	▲5.20
CPI(M) gain from INC		Swing	▼2.93	

=== 2011 ===
There were 2,07,229 registered voters in Aranmula Constituency for the 2011 Kerala Assembly election.

2011 Kerala Legislative Assembly election: Aranmula
Party	Candidate	Votes	%	±%
INC	K. Sivadasan Nair	64,845	47.69	▲35.89
CPI(M)	K. C. Rajagopalan	58,334	42.90	▼5.82
BJP	K. Haridas	10,227	7.52	▼1.44
BSP	T. Amrithakumar	721	0.53	
SDPI	Nazurudheen	709	0.52	
Independent	Sugathan R.	387	0.28	
Independent	D. Sivadasan Achari	343	0.25	
Independent	Madhu G.	206	0.15	
SLAP	K. V. Varghese	134	0.10	▼0.80
Independent	Pushpangadan	69	0.05	
Margin of victory		6,511	4.79	▼16.17
Turnout		1,35,975	65.62	▲3.39
INC gain from CPI(M)		Swing	▲35.89	

=== 2006 ===
There were 1,12,086 registered voters in the constituency for the 2006 election.

2006 Kerala Legislative Assembly election: Aranmula
Party	Candidate	Votes	%	±%
CPI(M)	K. C. Rajagopalan	34,007	48.8	▲2.6
Independent	K. R. Rajappan	19,387	27.8	−
DIC	Malethu Saraladevi	8,244	11.8	▼34.4
BJP	Ashokan Kulanada	6,250	9.0	▼3.8
SLAP	Thomaskutty	632	0.9	
Independent	V. R. Sisily	487	0.7	
Independent	Radhakrishnan S.	461	0.7	
Independent	C. C. Kuttappan	302	0.4	
Margin of victory		14,620	20.9	▲15.8
Turnout		69,794	62.3	▼8.7
CPI(M) gain from INC		Swing	▲2.6	

=== 2001 ===
There were 1,12,967 registered voters in the constituency for the 2001 election.

2001 Kerala Legislative Assembly election: Aranmula
Party	Candidate	Votes	%	±%
INC	Malethu Saraladevi	37,025	46.2	
CPI(M)	A. Padmakumar	32,900	41.1	
BJP	V. N. Unni	10,219	12.8	
Margin of victory		4,125	5.1	
Turnout		80,156	71.0	
INC gain from LDF		Swing		

== See also ==
- Aranmula
- Pathanamthitta
- Pathanamthitta district
- List of constituencies of the Kerala Legislative Assembly
- 2016 Kerala Legislative Assembly election
