= Pathanamthitta (disambiguation) =

Pathanamthitta is a town in Kerala, India.

Pathanamthitta may also refer to:

- Pathanamthitta district, a district in Kerala
- Pathanamthitta (Lok Sabha constituency), a constituency in Kerala
