= Malethu Sarala Devi =

Indian National Congress leader

Member of the Kerala Legislative Assembly
- Constituency: Aranmula

Personal details
- Born: October 1943 (age 82)

Malethu Sarala Devi (born October 1943) is an Indian National Congress leader who represented the Aranmula (State Assembly constituency) in the Kerala Legislative Assembly in 2001.
