= Aranmula Puncha =

Coordinates: 9.321°N 76.693°E

Aranmula Puncha is the vast Paddy fields in Aranmula with an area of approximately 5.36 km^{2}.

As part of Haritha Keralam programme, Government of Kerala relaunched cultivation in Aranmula Puncha in November 2016 following the abandonment of the Aranmula Airport project.

In February 2017, Government conducted a Harvest festival and launched Aranmula Rice brand at the function.
