= Nirbhay Sharma =

Indian politician

Lieutenant General Nirbhay Sharma PVSM, UYSM, AVSM, VSM
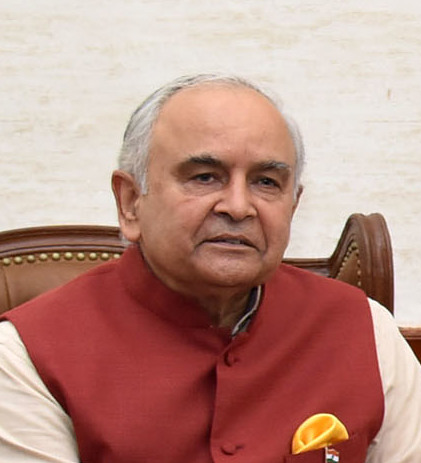

13th Governor of Mizoram
- In office 26 May 2015 – 25 May 2018
- Chief Minister: Lal Thanhawla
- Preceded by: Keshari Nath Tripathi
- Succeeded by: Kummanam Rajasekharan

14th Governor of Arunachal Pradesh
- In office 29 May 2013 – 12 May 2015
- Chief Minister: Nabam Tuki
- Preceded by: Joginder Jaswant Singh
- Succeeded by: Jyoti Prasad Rajkhowa

Personal details
- Born: 11 October 1946 (age 79) Lucknow, United Provinces, British India
- Spouse: Jyotsna Sharma
- Children: Nupur Sharma, Abhay Sharma
- Education: National Defence Academy

Lt Gen (Retd.) Nirbhay Sharma PVSM, UYSM, AVSM, VSM is the former Governor of Mizoram and former Governor of Arunachal Pradesh.

Born in Lucknow (Uttar Pradesh) in 1946, he is an alumnus of the National Defence Academy and was commissioned in the 2nd Battalion of the Parachute Regiment in 1966. General Sharma is one of the most distinguished and decorated Field Commanders of the Indian Army.

== Early life and career ==
Most of his assignments have dealt with Kashmir followed by North Eastern States; the last assignment being a Corps Commander and Security Advisor to the Government of J&K. During the period, his landmark contribution in fighting the ongoing proxy war in Kashmir, including the successful conduct of Parliamentary and Assembly Elections are well known. Apart from brilliantly directing anti-terrorist operations of over one lakh elements of the security force, his accomplishments include the construction of an anti-infiltration obstacle system along the Line of Control, opening the Uri-Muzaffarabad Road and the construction of the ‘Aman Setu’. He had earlier raised a Division during the ‘Kargil War’ (in record time). The concurrent conduct of disaster relief operations during the ‘Snow Tsunami’ and Earthquake also drew praise and recognition. His slogan of "Jawan aur Awaam, Aman hai Maqaam" and its manifestation on ground brought in a new approach and momentum to the ongoing peace process in Kashmir.

As a young captain, he fought in the 1971 War and was part of the Airborne Assault Group, the first Indian Army Unit to enter Dacca. Apart from commanding a battalion on the China border, he was part of the Sino-Indian Working Group and coordinated counter-insurgency operations in the North East with civil agencies and inter-ministerial delegations. The peace process with Naga rebels commenced during this period. Close interaction with the representatives of the armies and governments of Nepal, Bhutan, Myanmar and Bangladesh for effective border management and formulation of joint strategies to combat militancy, anti-national / criminal / hijacking activities and disaster management were also part of his charter.

Peace Building initiatives based on a just resolution of issues have been an integral part of his mandate as a Military Man and Strategic Expert.

As Director General (Perspective Planning) at Army Headquarters, Gen. Sharma worked on the restructuring of Army Headquarters and assisted in drafting Army Vision 2020. As Master General of Ordnance, he was responsible for material management for the Indian Army, including oversight of inventory and budgeting functions.

After 40 years of distinguished service in the Army, General Sharma was appointed Member of the Union Public Service Commission of India. As a Constitutional Authority, he presided over Interview Boards and Departmental Promotion Committees to select officers for the Civil Services. He also examined the framing and amendment of Recruitment and Service Rules and commented on disciplinary cases. He offered specific advice on examination reforms and other matters related to the development of the Indian Civil Service.

With an M.Sc. and an M.Phil. in Defence Studies (by correspondence) from Madras University, he is a widely recognised strategic thinker and defence analyst. General Sharma has been a Distinguished Fellow at the Observer Research Foundation, New Delhi (an independent Strategic and Public Policy think tank and research initiative), and several other similar institutions like the USI (United Service Institution of India), IDSA (Institute of Defence Studies & Analysis) and CPR (Centre for Policy & Research) etc. His articles and perspective have been published in many journals and newspapers and he has also participated in numerable seminars and discussions with leading global think tanks within the country and abroad.

On 4 May 2016, at a Special Convocation held in Mumbai, General Sharma was awarded Doctor of Letters (D.Litt.) Degree (Honoris Causa) by Tibrewala University, "in recognition of his outstanding contribution to the service of our motherland, exemplary patriotism, inspirational leadership and peacemaking initiatives."

The General was appointed Governor of the State of Arunachal Pradesh in May 2013 by His Excellency the President of India and was sworn in on 29 May 2013 as the eighteenth Governor. Arunachal Pradesh is strategically located in the North East of India, and has common borders with Bhutan, China and Myanmar.

After serving the state of Arunachal Pradesh for two years, he took the Oath of Office of the Governor of Mizoram, another North Eastern State sharing an international border of 722 km with Myanmar and Bangladesh, on 26 May 2015.

He is married to Jyotsna Sharma (an educationist) and they have a daughter, Nupur Sharma (a writer) and a son, Abhay Sharma (an international taxation and fund formation lawyer).

== Military awards and decorations ==

	Param Vishisht Seva Medal	Uttam Yudh Seva Medal	
Ati Vishist Seva Medal	Vishisht Seva Medal	Poorvi Star	Paschimi Star
Special Service Medal	Operation Vijay Star Medal	Sangram Medal	Operation Vijay Medal
Operation Parakram Medal	Sainya Seva Medal	High Altitude Service Medal	50th Anniversary of Independence Medal
25th Anniversary of Independence Medal	30 Years Long Service Medal	20 Years Long Service Medal	9 Years Long Service Medal

Political offices
Preceded by Joginder Jaswant Singh	Governor of Arunachal Pradesh; 29 May 2013 – 12 May 2015	Succeeded by Jyoti Prasad Rajkhowa
Preceded by Keshari Nath Tripathi	Governor of Mizoram; 26 May 2015 – 25 May 2018	Succeeded by Kummanam Rajasekharan
