= Sabarimala Ayyappa Seva Samajam =

- Founded: 13 November 2008
- Founder: Kummanam Rajasekharan
- Type: Community service
- Location: India
- Region served: Annadanam, medical facilities, assistance to Ayyappa devotees
- Method: Weekly gatherings, public meetings, awareness campaigns, social service programs etc.
- Key people: S J R Kumar (National Chairman)
- Parent organization: Rashtriya Swayamsevak Sangh
- Affiliations: None
- Employees: 0
- Volunteers: 15000
- Website: https://sassbharath.org

Sabarimala Ayyappa Seva Samajam (SASS) is an organization of Ayyappan devotees and an affiliate of the Sangh Parivar. It is a registered public charitable trust started on 13 November 2008 with headquarters at Pathanamthitta in Kerala. SASS aims to serve Ayyappa devotees in their pilgrimage to Sabarimala and inculcate dharmic values in them and their families and bring them together to further the larger aim of Hindu unity. SASS activities can be listed in 5S: Satsang, Swaadhyay, Seva, Samarasta and Sangharsh.

Sabarimala Ayyappa Seva Samajam was established as a charitable trust with the revered Guruswamy MN Nambiar as Chairman together with Hindu activist Kummanam Rajasekharan as its first General Secretary.

== Activities ==
The activities of Sabarimala Ayyappa Seva Samajam are

- Various services like Annadanam (offering free food), medical facilities, other necessary assistance to Sabarimala pilgrims
- To set up base camps and Seva Kendra (Help Centres) for Sabarimala pilgrims
- Organizing devotees of Ayyappa through weekly gathering, Satsang, Uthram Pooja, etc. throughout the year, to create awareness among people about Ayyappa Dharma and Sanatana Dharma
- Conducting Swach Sabarimala programme for cleaning and sanitation work in Sannidhanam, Pampa and Erumeli in association with Punyam Poonkavanam Project
- Organizing awareness campaigns on plastic free Sabarimala and plastic free Erumely through Ayyappa Yogams
