= Pathanamthitta Lok Sabha constituency =

Constituency of the Indian parliament in Kerala

Coordinates: 9.3°N 76.8°E

Pathanamthitta KL-17
- Lok Sabha constituency
- Pathanamthitta Lok Sabha constituency

Constituency details
- Country: India
- Region: South India
- State: Kerala
- Assembly constituencies: Kanjirappally; Poonjar; Thiruvalla; Ranni; Aranmula; Konni; Adoor
- Established: 2008
- Reservation: None

Member of Parliament
- 18th Lok Sabha
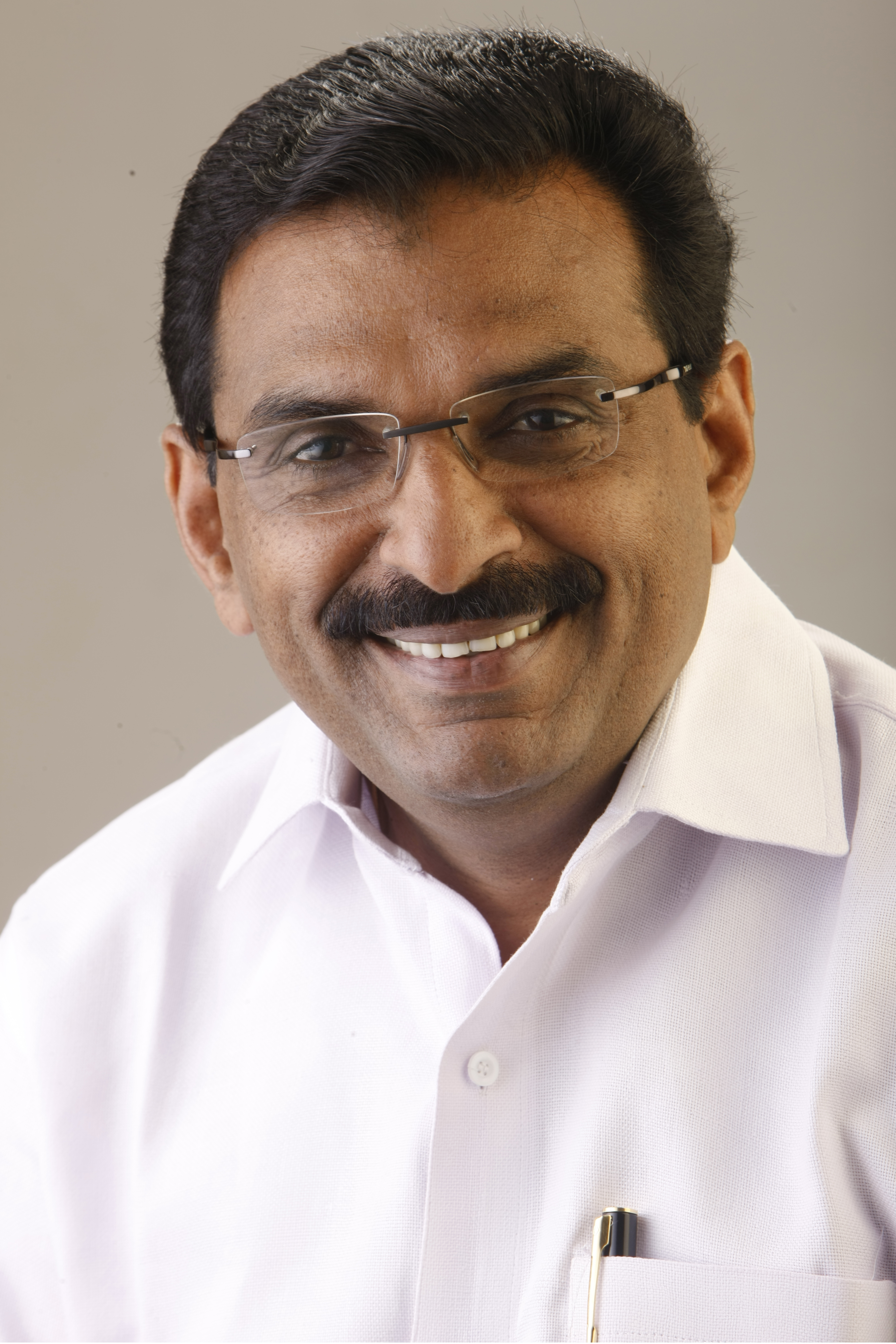
- Incumbent Anto Antony
- Party: INC
- Alliance: UDF
- Elected year: 2024

Pathanamthitta Lok Sabha constituency is one of the 20 Lok Sabha constituencies in Kerala state in southern India. It is a newly formed constituency in the Central Travancore region of Kerala for the election of a member of the Lok Sabha.

The district, which was previously fragmented into different parliamentary constituencies, was unified into a single Parliamentary constituency as per the Delimitation of Parliamentary and Assembly. Constituenciesc Order, 2008.

== Assembly segments ==
Pathanamthitta Lok Sabha constituency is composed of the following assembly segments:

No	Name	District	Member	Party	2024 Lead
100	Kanjirappally	Kottayam	Rony K Baby	INC	INC
101	Poonjar	Kottayam	Sebastian M. J.	INC	INC
111	Thiruvalla	Pathanamthitta	Varghese Mammen	KEC	INC
112	Ranni	Pathanamthitta	Pazhakulam Madhu	INC	INC
113	Aranmula	Pathanamthitta	Abin Varkey	INC	INC
114	Konni	Pathanamthitta	K. U. Jenish Kumar	CPI(M)	INC
115	Adoor (SC)	Pathanamthitta	C. V. Santhakumar	INC	INC

== Members of Parliament ==
Election	Lok Sabha	Member	Party	Tenure
2009	15th	Anto Antony	Indian National Congress	2009-2014
2014	16th	Anto Antony	Indian National Congress	2014-2019
2019	17th	Anto Antony	Indian National Congress	2019-2024
2024	18th	Anto Antony	Indian National Congress	2024-Incumbent

== Election results ==
In the first election held in this district on 16 May 2009, United Democratic Front (UDF) candidate Anto Antony Punnathaniyil of the Indian National Congress was elected by 408,232 votes over K. Ananthagopan of the Communist Party of India (Marxist) 297,026; B. Radhakrishna Menon of the Bharatiya Janata Party 56,294; K. K. Nair of the Bahujan Samaj Party 22,424; and Mani C. Kappan of the Nationalist Congress Party 4,445 votes.

=== General Elections 2029 ===
2029 Indian general election: Pathanamthitta
Party	Candidate	Votes	%	±%
INC				
LDF				
NDA				
NOTA	None of the above			
Margin of victory				
Turnout				
		Swing		

=== General Election 2024 ===
2024 Indian general election: Pathanamthitta
Party	Candidate	Votes	%	±%
INC	Anto Antony	367,623	40.01	▲2.87
CPI(M)	T. M. Thomas Isaac	3,01,504	32.79	▼0.01
BJP	Anil K. Antony	2,34,406	25.49	▼3.48
BSP	Adv. P. K. Geethakrishnan	3,972	0.44	
PPI (S)	Joy P. Mathew	1,181	0.13	
Independent	K. C. Thomas	1,101	0.12	
API	Adv. Harikumar M. K.	762	0.08	
Independent	Anoop V.	609	0.07	
NOTA	None of the above	8,411	0.91	
Majority		66,119	7.30	▲2.99
Turnout		9,21,565	64.27	▼10.03
INC hold		Swing		

By Assembly Segments (2024)

No.	Constituency	Party	Lead
100	Kanjirappally	INC	9,800
101	Poonjar	INC	12,610
111	Thiruvalla	INC	11,530
112	Ranni	INC	9,597
113	Aranmula	INC	14,717
114	Konni	INC	2,579
115	Adoor (SC)	INC	2,266

=== 2019 ===
According to Election Commission, there are 13,40,193 registered voters in Pathanamthitta Constituency for 2019 Lok Sabha Election. Pathanamthitta Constituency was polled 74.19% of total electorate.

2019 Indian general election: Pathanamthitta
Party	Candidate	Votes	%	±%
INC	Anto Antony	380,927	37.11	▼4.08
CPI(M)	Veena George	3,36,684	32.80	▼2.00
BJP	K. Surendran	2,97,396	28.97	▲13.50
BSP	Shibu Parakkadavan	3,814	0.37	
Independent	Veena V.	1,809	0.18	
API	Jose George	1,355	0.13	
SUCI(C)	Binu Baby	622	0.06	
Independent	Ratheesh Choorakkodu	594	0.06	
NOTA	None of the above	3,352		
Margin of victory		44,243	4.31	
Turnout		10,27,378	74.30	
INC hold		Swing		

By Assembly Segments (2019)

No.	Constituency	Party	Lead
100	Kanjirappally	INC	9,743
101	Poonjar	INC	17,929
111	Thiruvalla	INC	3,739
112	Ranni	INC	7,824
113	Aranmula	INC	6,593
114	Konni	INC	2,721
115	Adoor (SC)	CPI(M)	1,956

=== Indian general election, 2014 ===
2014 Indian general election: Pathanamthitta
Party	Candidate	Votes	%	±%
INC	Anto Antony	358,842	41.19	−10.02
LDF	Peelipose Thomas	302,651	34.74	−2.52
BJP	M. T. Ramesh	138,954	15.95	+8.89
Margin of victory		56,191	6.46	−7.49
Turnout		8,69,452	66.01	
INC hold		Swing		

By Assembly Segments (2014)

No.	Constituency	Party	Lead
100	Kanjirappally	INC	9,726
101	Poonjar	INC	2,761
111	Thiruvalla	INC	13,281
112	Ranni	INC	9,091
113	Aranmula	INC	11,349
114	Konni	INC	8,096
115	Adoor (SC)	INC	1,958

=== Indian general election, 2009 ===
2009 Indian general election: Pathanamthitta
Party	Candidate	Votes	%	±%
INC	Anto Antony	408,232	51.21	New
CPI(M)	Adv. K. Anantha Gopan	2,97,026	37.26	New
BJP	B. Radhakrishna Menon	56,294	7.06	New
Margin of victory		1,11,206	13.95	New
Turnout		7,97,154	65.6	
INC hold		Swing		

By Assembly Segments (2009)

No.	Constituency	Party	Lead
100	Kanjirappally	INC	16,855
101	Poonjar	INC	26,224
111	Thiruvalla	INC	15,489
112	Ranni	INC	15,696
113	Aranmula	INC	18,328
114	Konni	INC	8,760
115	Adoor (SC)	INC	9,922

== See also ==
- Kottayam District
- List of constituencies of the Lok Sabha
- Pathanamthitta district
