= Abin Varkey Kodiyattu =

Indian Youth Congress politician and advocate from Kerala

Abin Varkey
- അബിൻ വർകി കൊടിയാട്ട്
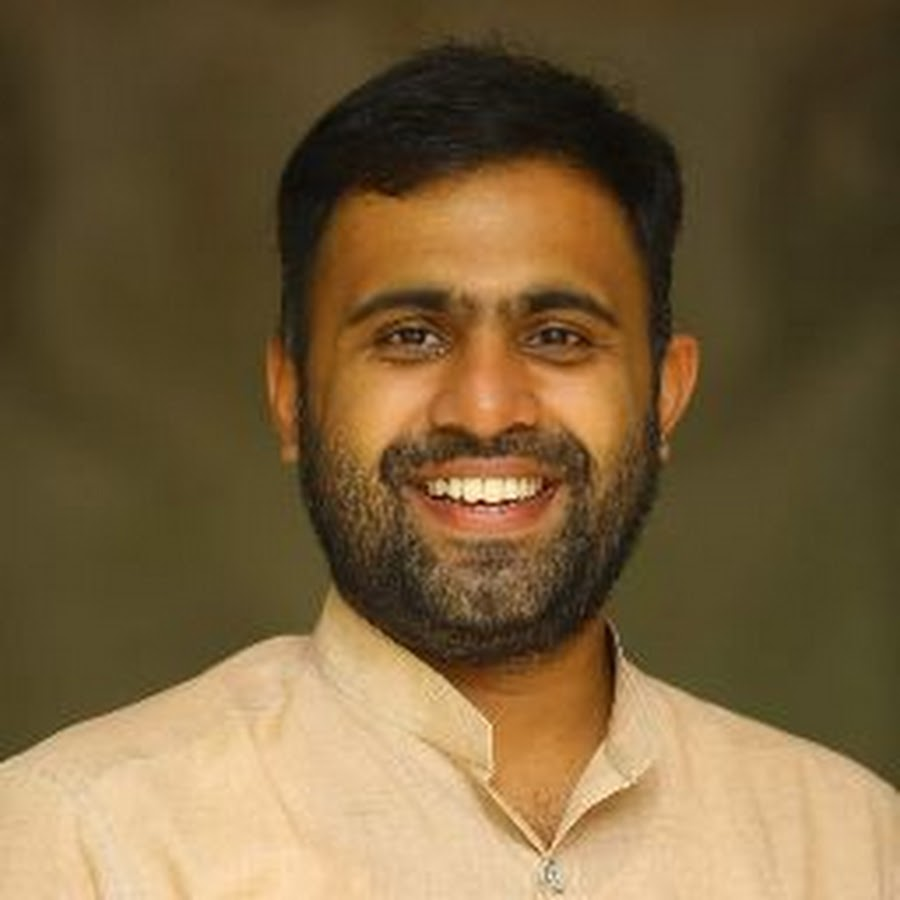
- Abin in 2015

Member of the Kerala Legislative Assembly
- Incumbent
- Assumed office 13 May 2026
- Preceded by: Veena George
- Constituency: Aranmula

Personal details
- Born: Kolenchery, Kerala
- Party: Indian National Congress
- Education: Sree Narayana Gurukulam College of Engineering, Kerala Law Academy Law College, Thiruvananthapuram
- Occupation: Member of Legislative Assembly- Aranmula,Politician, advocate

Abin Varkey is an Indian lawyer and politician affiliated with the Indian National Congress who is the MLA for Aranmula Assembly constituency. He has been active in the party’s youth wings, serving as State Vice President of the Indian Youth Congress in Kerala and as National Secretary of the National Students' Union of India. His involvement in internal party elections and organisational debates has been reported in regional and national media.

== Early life and education ==
Kodiyattu was born in Kolenchery, Ernakulam district, Kerala. He studied civil engineering at Sree Narayana Gurukulam College of Engineering and later obtained a law degree from Kerala Law Academy Law College, Thiruvananthapuram.

== Political career ==
Kodiyattu began his political activity in the National Students' Union of India, where he served as National Secretary. He later became State Vice President of the Indian Youth Congress in Kerala.

In the 2023 Youth Congress Kerala State President election, he received 168,588 votes, finishing second behind Rahul Mamkootathil. He was subsequently appointed one of the State Vice Presidents.

During the 2025 reorganisation of the Youth Congress in Kerala, media reports noted him as a possible candidate for the State President post, though the role went to O. J. Janeesh. Following his appointment as National Secretary of the Youth Congress, Kodiyattu requested permission to continue political work in Kerala.

== Professional career ==
Kodiyattu also practices as an advocate and has a background in civil engineering.
