= Aranmula International Airport =

Proposed airport in Kerala, India

Aranmula International Airport was an airport project planned to be built at Aranmula, Pathanamthitta district of Kerala in India, at a cost of ₹20 billion (US$210 million). The airport never received the necessary clearances and the project was abandoned. The airport was proposed to be built on about 700 acres (2.8 km^{2}) of land. The controversial project faced strong protest from environmentalists and opposition parties of Kerala. After the Supreme Court of India ratified an order of National Green Tribunal verdict declaring the Aranmula Airport Project in violation of environmental requirements, the Government of India withdrew its sanction for the airport, leading to the termination of the project.

== History ==
The Kerala government had provided an in-principle approval for the airport during the Left Democratic Front rule in 2009, with the condition that the promoters procure sufficient land on their own. The Central Government gave the green signal for the proposed airport in October 2012 and the project was estimated to be completed within 18 months. An executive summary of the project including the anticipated environmental impact was prepared by Chennai-based Enviro Care India Pvt. Ltd. and was submitted to the Government of India. However, the Environmental clearance for the project was not granted.

The Legislative Assembly Committee on Environmental Affairs chaired by C P Mohammed MLA found the Airport Project "highly detrimental to the environment" The project met with opposition right from its initial stages from leaders of various streams of society including poet-cum-environmentalist Sugathakumari and politician V. M. Sudheeran, Hindu Ikya Vedi's Secretary Kummanam Rajasekharan. Allegations of discrepancies in awarding clearances through easy processes were raised, adding to the project's controversies. The Communist Party of India leaders like P. Prasad a close aide of Medha Patkar was also at the forefront of the struggle. They have approached National Green Tribunal against the clearance given by Ministry of Environment, Forest and Climate Change to KGS Aranmula Airport Ltd to set up an airport.

The Kerala State Biodiversity Board submitted a report to the government in March 2013, expressing its reservations over "the land use changes and ecological imbalance that the project will entail."

On 2 April 2013, National Green Tribunal Act granted an interim stay on the project banning any construction at the site. It also stayed the Kerala Government's order to convert the 500 acres of land for industrial purposes until further orders. The airport project was given environmental clearance by the Ministry of Environment and Forests, New Delhi on 19 November 2013. The national green tribunal canceled the environmental clearance on 28 May 2014. The promoters failed to overturn this order in the Supreme Court of India which lead to the abandonment of the project.

== Status ==
The project is now abandoned (since 2014). Following the abandonment some of the area of Aranmula Puncha is being returned to rice cultivation.

== See also ==
- Sabarimala Airport
