= Anto Antony =

Indian politician and agriculturist

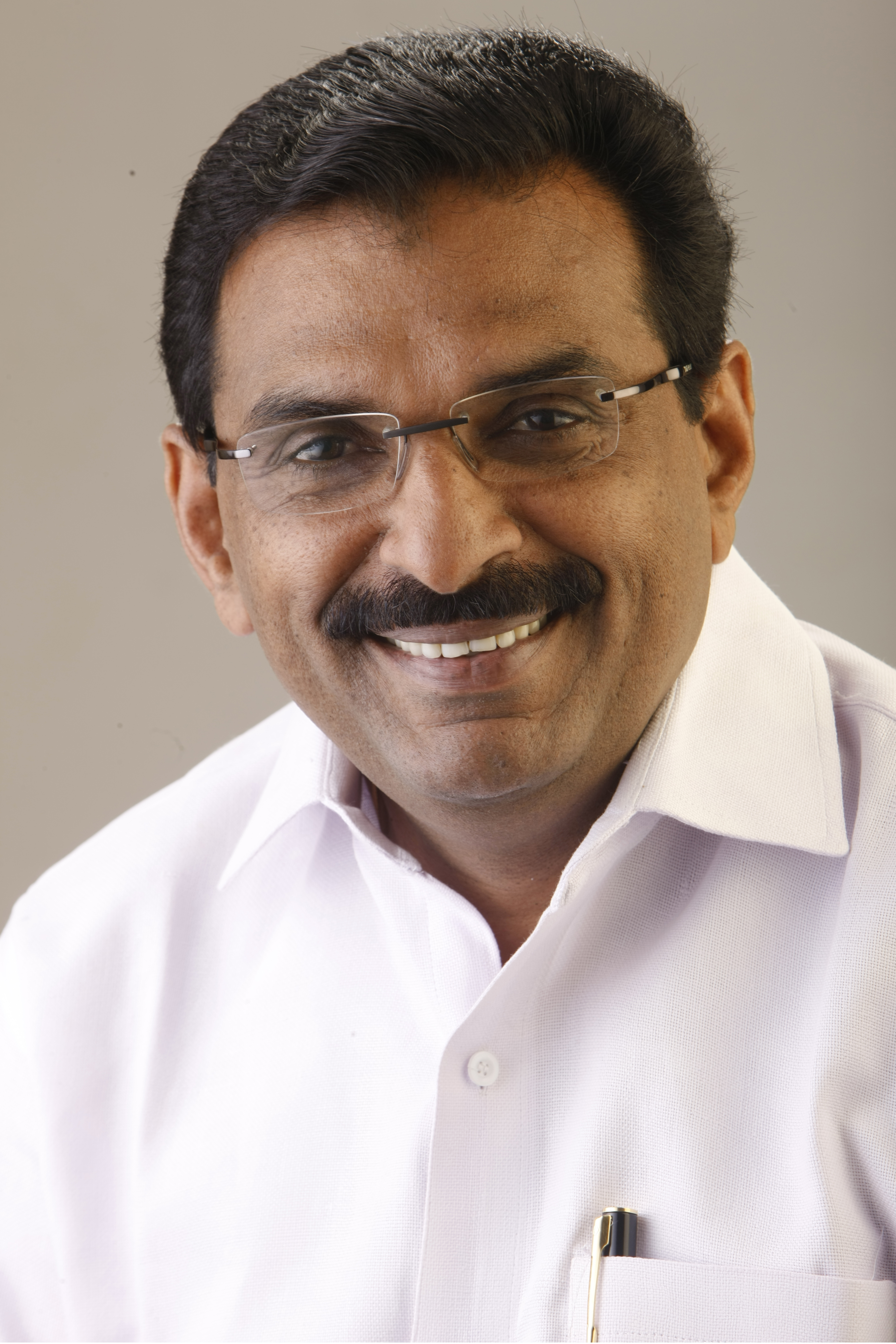

Member of Parliament, Lok Sabha
- Incumbent
- Assumed office 31 May 2009
- Preceded by: Constituency established
- Constituency: Pathanamthitta

Personal details
- Born: 1 May 1957 (age 69) Moonilavu, Kerala, India
- Party: Indian National Congress
- Spouse: Smt. Grace Anto
- Children: 2
- Parent(s): Punnathaniyil Kuruvilla Antony; Chinnamma Antony
- Education: St. Thomas College, Palai; Kerala Law Academy, Thiruvananthapuram; Government Law College, Ernakulam; Rajagiri College of Social Sciences
- Occupation: Politician, Agriculturist
- Website: antoantony.in

Anto Antony Punnathaniyil (born 1 May 1957) is an Indian politician and agriculturist who has been serving as Member of Parliament for Pathanamthitta, Kerala, since 2009. A member of Indian National Congress, he serves as a member of the Standing Committee on Transport, Tourism and Culture and is also a member of the Consultative Committee on Minority Affairs. He was formerly a member of the Standing Committee on External Affairs, Energy and Committee on Government Assurances.

In 2009, he made a significant breakthrough when he was elected as a United Democratic Front (UDF) candidate from the newly apportioned Pathanamthitta district. Since then he has retained the seat through the subsequent elections held in 2014, 2019 and 2024.

== Personal life ==
He was born in Moonilavu, Kerala, to Chinnamma and P. K. Antony of Punnathaniyil house. He pursued his education at St. Thomas College, Pala, followed by the Kerala Law Academy Law College, Thiruvananthapuram, the Government Law College, Ernakulam, and the Rajagiri College of Social Sciences. He is married to Grace Anto and the couple has two children.

== Political life ==
His political career began with his involvement in the Kerala Students Union. His leadership skills were recognised early on, leading to his appointment as the union's general secretary. Being a member of the Indian National Congress, on 16 May 2009, in the first election held in this newly apportioned constituency of Pathanamthitta, he was elected as a United Democratic Front (UDF) candidate by 408,232 votes over K. Ananthagopan of the Communist Party of India (Marxist) with 297,026; B. Radhakrishna Menon of the Bharatiya Janata Party with 56,294 and three other candidates. In 2014 general elections, he was re-elected from the same constituency with a margin of 58,836 against LDF supported opponent independent candidate Peelipose Thomas, who was an ex DCC president.

For the 2024 General elections also, the Congress party renominated Anto Antony to contest from Pathanamthitta Lok Sabha Constituency and he won in the election. In 2004, he had lost in the Kottayam race to CPI(M) candidate K. Suresh Kurup, by 341,213 votes to his 298,299. He won Lok Sabha elections from Pathanamthitta in 2009, 2014, 2019 and 2024.

Election	Constituency	Result	Margin
2004	Kottayam	Lost	42,914
2009	Pathanamthitta	Won	1,11,206
2014	Pathanamthitta	Won	56,191
2019	Pathanamthitta	Won	44,243
2024	Pathanamthitta	Won	66,119
