= Kummanam =

- town
- Location in Kerala, India Kummanam (India)
- Coordinates: 9°35′0″N 76°30′0″E
- Country: India
- State: Kerala
- District: Kottayam

Languages
  - Official: Malayalam, English
- Time zone: UTC+5:30 (IST)
- Vehicle registration: KL-05
- Nearest city: kottayam
- Lok Sabha constituency: kottayam

Kummanam is a village that lies on either side of river Meenachil. Administratively it is in Thiruvarpu and Aymanam Gramapanchayat of Kottayam district in Kerala State, India. Capital town of Kottayam District is 4 km east from here. A bridge named Thazhathangadi palam connects either areas beside river. Kummanam is near the tourist road from Kumarakom to Thekkady.

== Etymology ==
Kummanam has the meaning 'gloomy forest' in Malayalam. The abbreviation "Ku" in Sanskrit refers to anything negative and Vanam refers to forest. Initially Kummanam was known as "Kuvanam" which later evolved into Kummanam.

== History ==
Thazhathangady is an ancient river port in Kummanam. "Thazhe" in Malayalam means low and "Angadi" refers to market. Arabians, Persians, Romans, Greeks, Jews, Syrians and Egyptians travelled to this ancient port for Spice Trade. Portuguese traders built houses here on the banks of River Meenachil and a church dedicated to Saint George.

Thaliyil Kotta near Thazhathangadi was the seat of Thekkumkoor kings. Thali was an administrative division and kotta means fort. King Marthanda Varma annexed Thekkumkoor to Travancore. Vedipurackal is the place where Thekkumkoor kings kept gunpowder. Vanchiyathu is the place where Thekkumkoor kings kept royal canoes. There are houses still bearing these names in Thazhathangadi.

== Festivals ==
Thazathangadi hosts a boat race or Vallam Kali in August/September every year during festival of Onam. This boat race began about one hundred years ago.

== Temples ==
Elamkavu Kaali temple is in Kummanam. Thazhathangady Juma Masjid, third oldest mosques in India is more than 1000 years old locates beside Meenachil river. Southern half of it is demolished and extended with iron pillars, aluminium sheets and minars in 2012. It is famous for its richness of architecture, wood carvings and the beauty.
