= Hindu Aikya Vedi =

Indian Hindutva organisation

- Formation: Kerala
- Founder: Swami Satyananda Saraswati; J. Sisupalan
- Purpose: Hindu renaissance; Temple protection
- Headquarters: Samanwaya Bhavan, Kottakkakom, Thiruvananthapuram
- Region served: India
- Official language: Malayalam
- State President: R.V.Babu
- Parent organisation: Rashtriya Swayamsevak Sangh
- Affiliations: Sangh Parivar
- Website: hinduaikyavedi.org

The Hindu Aikya Vedi, also called Aikya Hindu Vedika (transl. Hindu United Forum), is a Hindutva organisation in the state of Kerala, India. The organisation has been associated with supporting comments on the beef ban in the state of Maharashtra.
