= Sálim Ali Centre for Ornithology and Natural History =

Education centre in India

Logo of the Sálim Ali Centre for Ornithology and Natural History

The Sálim Ali Centre for Ornithology and Natural History (SACON) is the centre of Wildlife Institute of India, located in Anaikatti, Coimbatore, Tamil Nadu (India), near the foothills of the Nilgiri Biosphere Reserve. It is a national centre for information, education and research in ornithology and natural history in India.

According to SACON, its mission is "To help conserve India’s biodiversity and its sustainable use through research, education and peoples' participation, with birds at the centre stage".

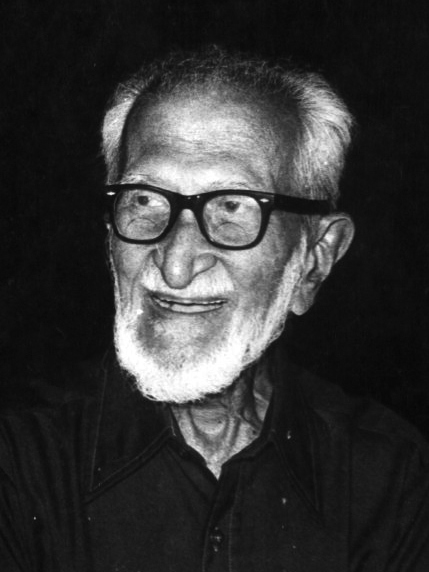
Salim Ali (1890–1987) "The Birdman of India"

== Infrastructure ==
Sálim Ali Centre for Ornithology and Natural History (SACON) in Tamil Nadu

11°6′13″N 76°47′3″E
Area: 223,000 square metres (2,400,000 sq ft)

Elevation: 660 metres (2,170 ft)

SACON's main campus is at Anaikatty, 24 km (15 mi) northwest of Coimbatore, near the trijunction of Kerala, Tamil Nadu and Karnataka at the foothills of the Nilgiri Biosphere Reserve. It offers multiple opportunities for long-term studies on various aspects of avifauna and the biological principles and phenomena involved in the maintenance of fragile eco-systems.

Its 223,000 square metres (2,400,000 sq ft) of land is built up with around 3,438 m^{2} (37,010 sq ft) of buildings for housing offices, laboratory, library, common facilities and a student hostel. The unique round buildings of the campus were designed by Laurie Baker (1917–2007), a world-renowned eco-friendly architect, and was dedicated on 11 February 2000.

Laboratory

The 1,022 m^{2} (11,000 sq ft) SACON laboratory is equipped with advanced scientific equipment to support their research and educational programmes. It is probably the best in the country for ecotoxicological studies of birds and wildlife and includes the following:

UV Spectrophotometer, Perkin Elmer Model Lambda 35

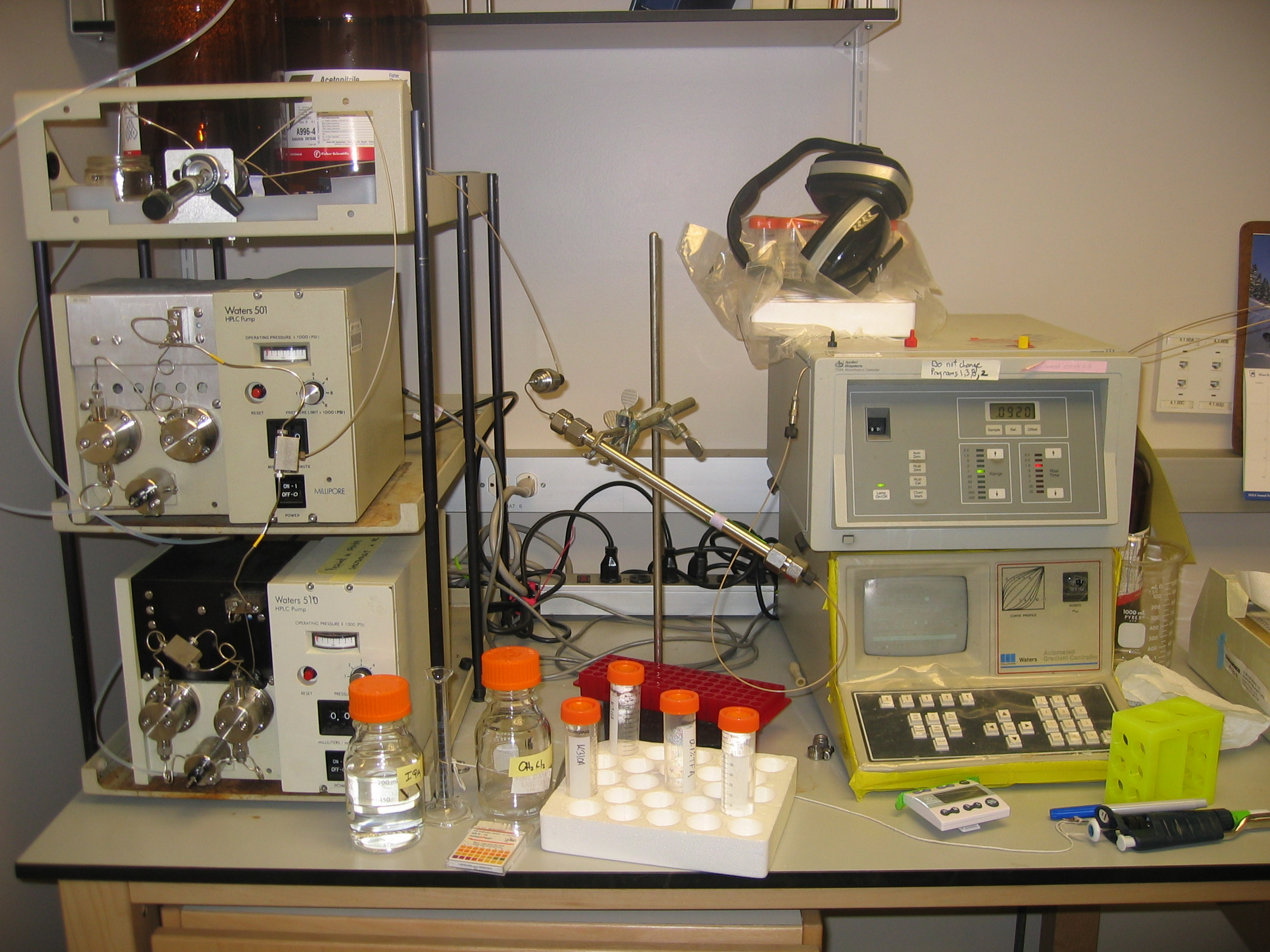
High Performance Liquid Chromatograph

High Performance Liquid Chromatograph – Agilent Technologies Model 1100 series with Diode array detector and Fluorescence detector
Flame Atomic Absorption Spectrophotometer (AAS) – Perkin Elmer, Model 3300 with 13 lamps for analysing metal residues
Graphite Furnace Atomic Absorption Spectrophotometer for analysing metal residues

Mercury Hydride Generator for AAS, Perkin Elmer for analysing mercury and other hydride forming elements
Microwave Digestion System, Milestone Model 1200 for digesting samples for analysis in the AAS

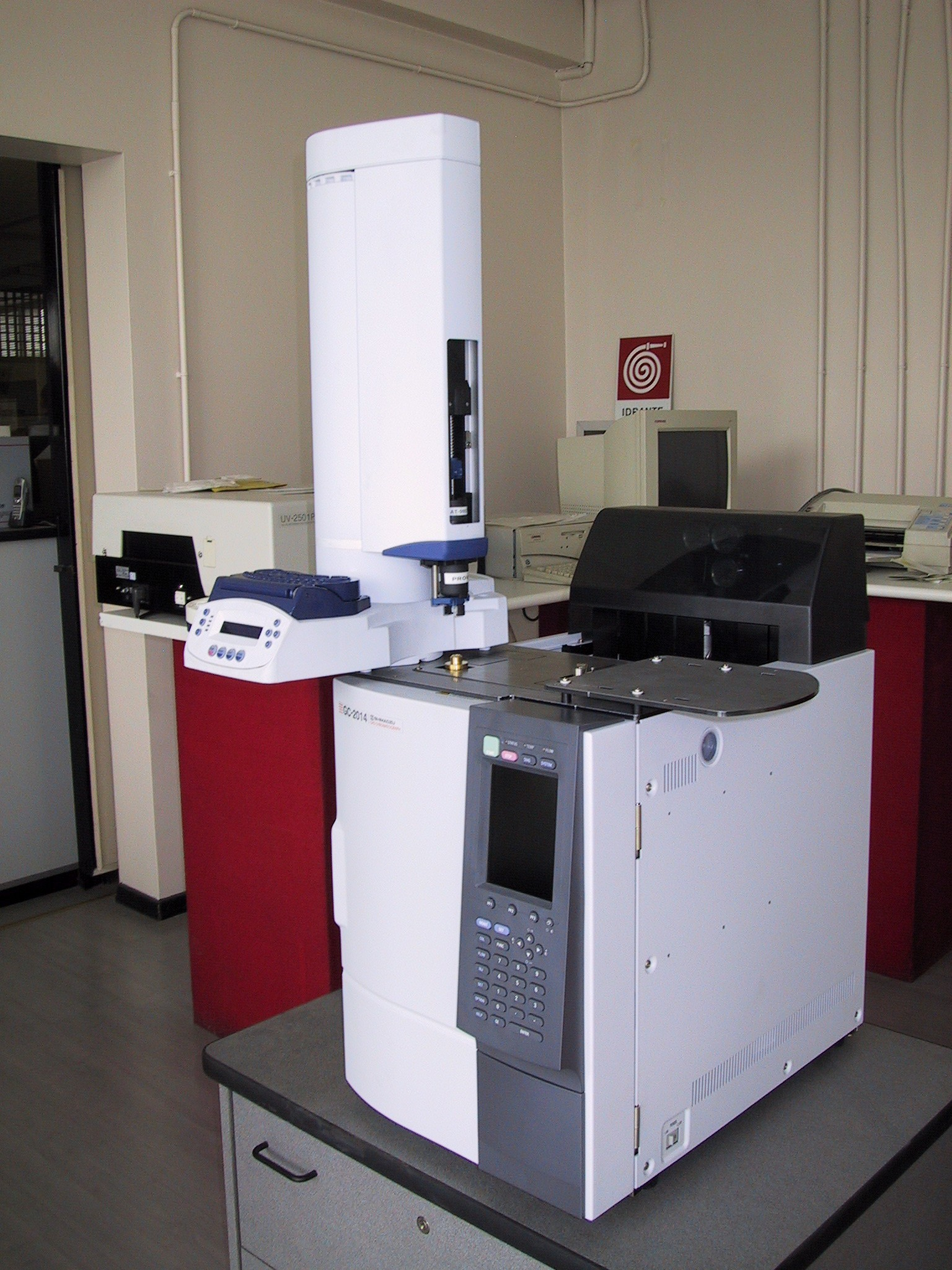
Gas Chromatograph with detector

Gas Chromatograph, Hewlett Packard Model 5890 Series II with three detectors, (Electron Capture Detector, Nitrogen Phosphorus Detector and Flame Photometric Detector) for analysing pesticide residues and organic pollutants.
Dissolved Oxygen Analyser
Biochemical Oxygen Demand Incubator
Flame Photometer
Vertical Laminar Flow Chamber
High volume air sampler for sampling suspended particulate matters, oxides of nitrogen (NOx) and oxides of sulphur (SOx)
Ultracentrifuge
Ultra Deep Freezer (−800 C), New Brunkswick
Walk-in cold room
Library

The 1,394 m^{2} (15,000 sq ft) 2-story library building can accommodate around 50 people. Total holding of the library is 2813 Books, 2381 back volumes of periodicals, 75 Current periodicals (Indian 44; International 31), 2706 maps and 51 CD-ROMs of reference materials. Internet literature searching is available to the staff and students. The library facilities are available to students, scholars and scientists from other institutions.

Computer facilities

Each scientist is provided with a laptop computer and Pentium PC. There is a general facility for students and visiting scientists. All are connected with a broadband local area network.

== Research ==
Research activities are coordinated by the Director Incharge and conducted by five research divisions, namely conservation ecology, ecotoxicology, environmental impact assessment, landscape ecology and restoration ecology. Within the divisions there are research programmes in: Avian ecology and endangered bird conservation, Man and biodiversity conservation, Wetlands conservation, Environmental contamination and biodiversity, Environmental Impact Assessment, Modelling and simulation and Nature Education. The scientific staff includes three Senior Principal Scientists, four Senior Scientists, and one Nature Education Officer.

During 2007-2008 SACON undertook 19 research projects:

Conservation ecology
Status and ecology of the Andaman Crake;
Mumbai trans-harbour sea link project: Study of Flamingos and migratory birds;
Inventory of the biodiversity of Attappady with GIS aid;
Ecology and conservation of the Spot-billed Pelican in Andhra Pradesh;
Identification and mapping of Lesser Florican breeding sites to develop a fodder producing grassland network in western India;
In-situ & Ex-situ conservation of the Edible-nest Swiftlet (Collocalia fuciphaga) in the Andaman & Nicobar Islands;
Strengthening community conservation efforts in Nagaland – A programme to impart technical support on biodiversity conservation and livelihood options to communities, Phase 1: Phek, Tuensang, Kiphere, Longleng and Mon Districts;
Ecology of the endangered Indian Rock Python (Python molurus) in Keoladeo National Park, Bharatpur, Rajasthan, India;
A study on the Herpetofaunal communities of the Upper Vaigai Plateau, Western Ghats, India.
Landscape ecology
ENVIS Centre on Wetland Ecosystems, Multilevel and multiscalar analysis of wetland systems to evaluate balance in ecosystem services and sustainability concerns – Kolleru Wildlife Sanctuary, a Ramsar site in Andhra Pradesh;
GIS for Rajahmundry Parliamentary constituency, Pollination and seed dispersal by animals in the dry deciduous forests of southern Eastern Ghats;
Ecology of Indian Grey Hornbill (Ocyceros birostris) with special reference to its role in seed dispersal in southern Eastern Ghats;
Plant-bird interactions with special reference to identification of bird-attracting plants for afforestation of Attappady valley, Kerala.
Ecotoxicology
Impact of agricultural pesticides on the population status and breeding success of select species of fish-eating birds in Tamil Nadu
Environmental Impact Assessment
Rapid Environmental Impact Assessment of the India-based Neutrino Observatory, Singara, Nilgiris, Tamil Nadu;
Management Plan for the Eco-restoration of Pallikaranai Reserve Forest;
Status of Blewitt's Owl in Araku Valley and Environmental Management Plan in View of the Proposed Bauxite Mines.

== Education ==
The SACON is affiliated with Bharathiar University. In 2006–07, 26 SACON students were enrolled for PhD and 2 for M.Phil. One PhD degree was awarded and three theses for PhDs submitted. Eight MSc students from different colleges and universities did their dissertation work at SACON for the partial fulfillment of their degree.

The nature education division conducted several programmes including a one-month residential vacation training programme on Bioresources for School Children.
SACON collaborates with the Centre for Ecological Sciences, Indian Institute of Science, Bangalore, on the People’s Biodiversity Register through School Children programme, involving five local schools.

In addition to student research programmes, other nature education programmes conducted during 2006–07 included Nature Camps for students of Coimbatore,
Wildlife Week Celebrations,
Nature Awareness Competitions and Sálim Ali Trophy awards,
Young Bird Watcher of the Year contest,
Sálim Ali Birth Anniversary celebrations,
World Wetlands day Programme,
The 3rd Children’s Ecology Congress (CEC) and
Naming common butterflies in Tamil.

"Song of Sparrow: Nature Education e-Newsletter" a bimonthly e-newsletter was also published and circulated to the Salim Ali Naturalists Forum during the period.

SACON also conducted short term training programmes on instrumentation and analytical techniques and offered analytical service to industries and academic institutions.

Consultations and conferences

A rapid environmental assessment of the Kundah pumped storage hydro electric project in the Nilgiris was completed. Another EIA project for the Mumbai trans-harbour sea link project: Study of Flamingos and migratory birds was completed. Andhra Pradesh Community Based Tank Project – Environmental and Social Assessment Study was also completed.

During 2006–2007, SACON conducted a Workshop on Conservation and Management of Biodiversity in Teesta Valley, Sikkim at Gangtok, Sikkim.
A National Conference on Biodiversity Conservation and Human Well-being was conducted jointly with the Department of Zoology, Osmania University.

SACON staff presented papers in 58 national and international conferences, workshops and seminars and delivered 13 invited/plenary lectures.

== Publications ==
Several research communications were made during 2006–2007 by SACON researchers. These included 12 scientific reports, 28 research papers, 8 chapters in edited books and 5 articles in technical newsletters.

== See also ==
- Conservation in India
