= Aranmula kannadi =

Indian handmade metal-alloy mirrors

Aranmula Kannadi
- Malayalam: ആറന്മുളക്കണ്ണാടി
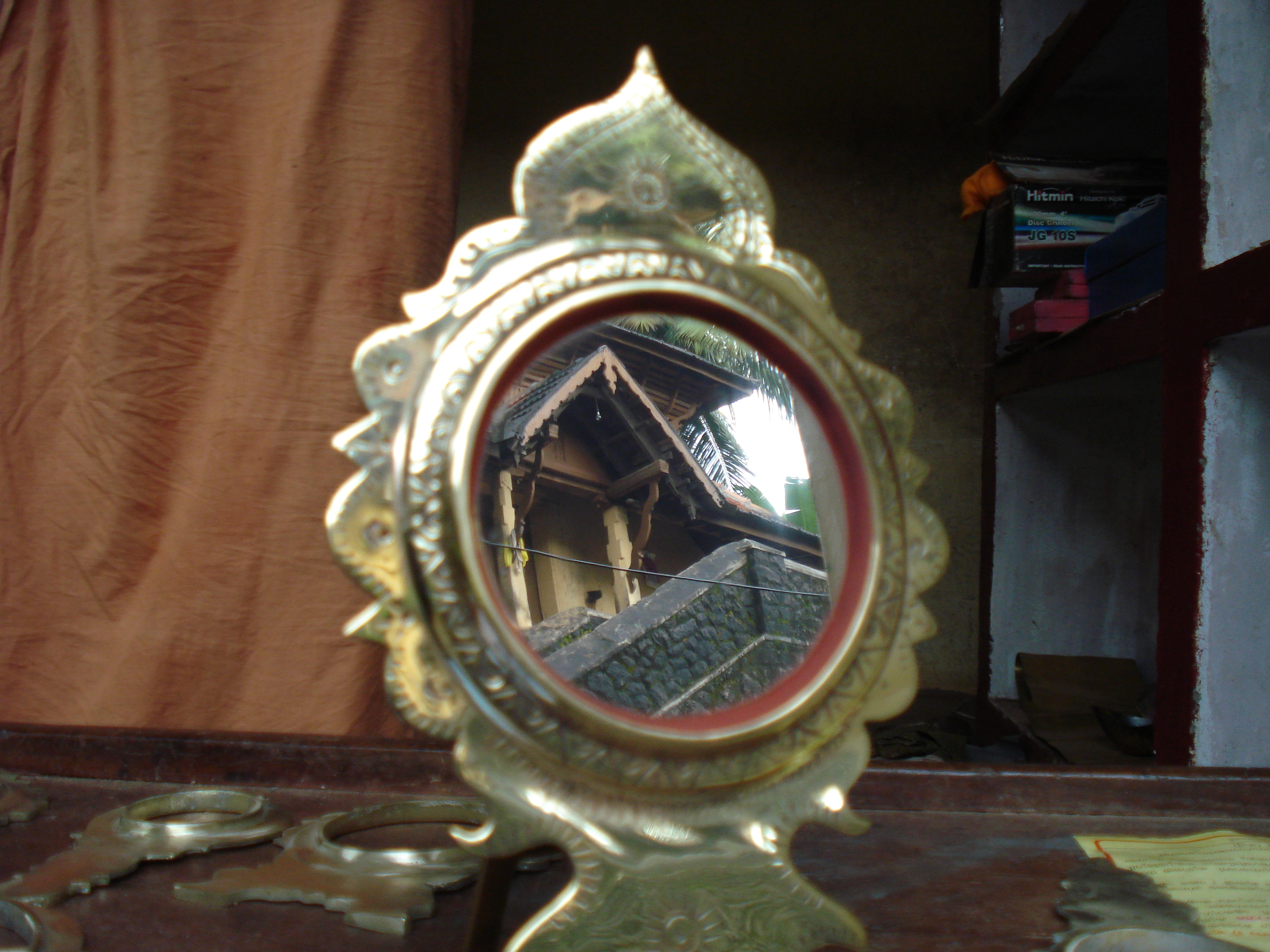
- An Aranmula mirror in an etched brass frame
- Type: Metal-alloy first surface mirror
- Material: Bronze (copper and tin alloy)
- Place: Aranmula, Kerala, India

Aranmula Kannadi (Malayalam: ആറന്മുളക്കണ്ണാടി), meaning the Aranmula mirror, is a handmade, metal-alloy, first surface mirror made in Aranmula, a small town in Pathanamthitta in the state of Kerala, India. The mirrors received a geographical indication (GI) tag in 2005.

== Description ==
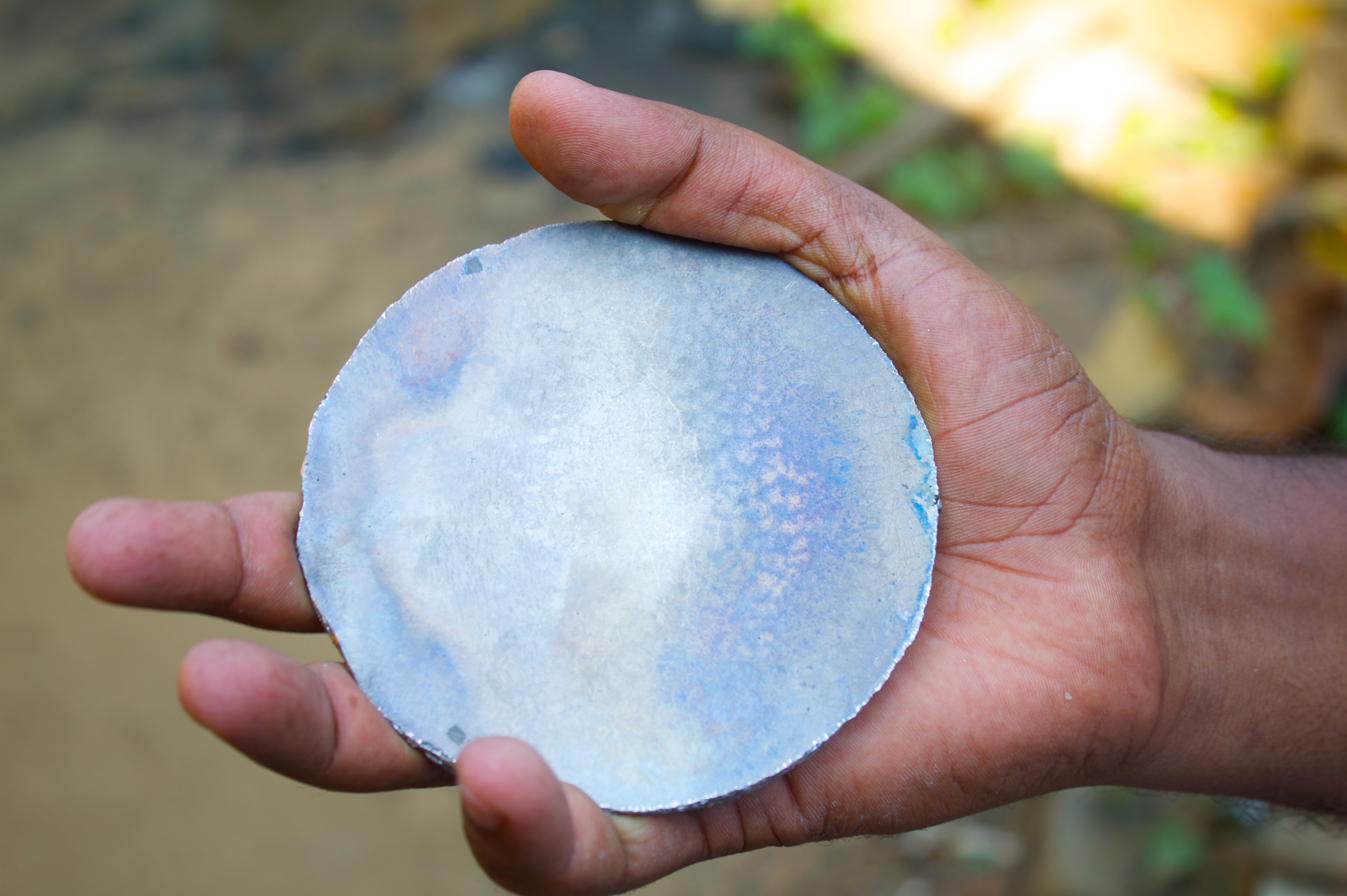
Aranmula kannadi in its raw, unpolished form

Unlike normal "silvered" glass mirrors, it is a metal-alloy first surface mirror or front surface reflection mirror, which eliminates secondary reflections and aberrations typical of back surface mirrors.

It is polished for several days to achieve the mirror's reflective surface. The polishing is done using an abrasive paste made by mixing rice bran with oil extracted from the seeds of the maroṭṭi tree (Hydnocarpus pentandrus).

== Cultural significance ==
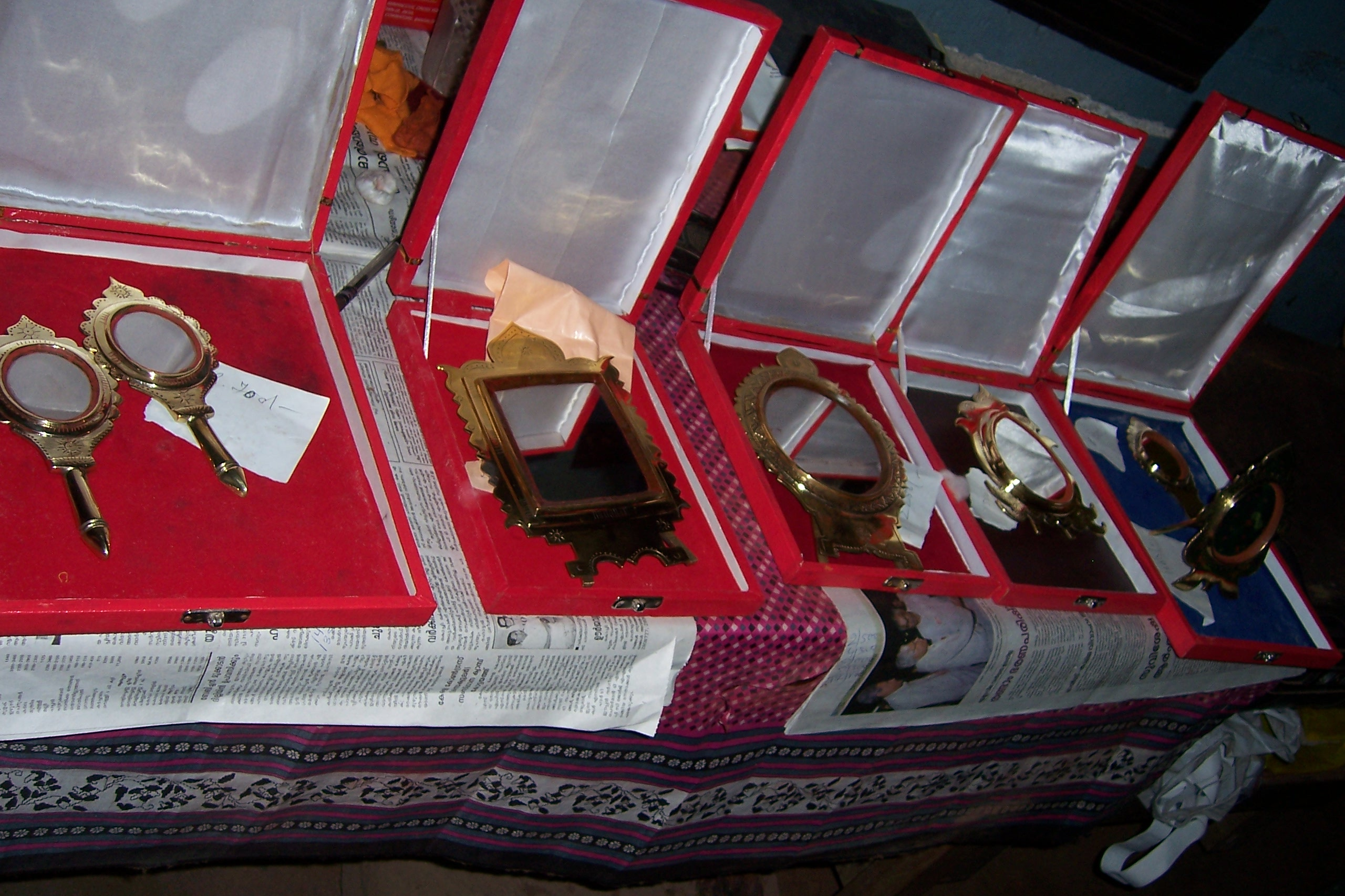
Aranmula kannadi in various etched brass frames on display

The origins of the Aranmula kannadi are linked to the Aranmula Parthasarathy Temple. According to local legend, centuries ago the royal chief brought eight families of temple artisans and craftsmen from Tirunelveli district in Tamil Nadu to Aranmula to create the mirrors for the temple.

The mirrors are considered one of the eight auspicious items (ashtamangalyam) used during the entry of a bride at a traditional Kerala wedding venue. Locally, they are thought to bring prosperity and good luck.

The British Museum in London has an Aranmula mirror measuring 45 centimetres tall in its collection. The mirrors received a geographical indication (GI) tag in 2005.

== See also ==
- Aranmula Kottaram
- Bronze mirror
- Speculum metal

== Bibliography ==
- Srinivasan, Sharada; Glover, Ian C. (1995). "Wrought and quenched, and cast high-tin bronzes in Kerala State, India". Historical Metallurgy. 29 (2): 69–88.
- Srinivasan, Sharada (2008). "Mirrors: Metal mirrors from India" (PDF). In Selin, Helaine (ed.). Encyclopaedia of the History of Science, Technology, and Medicine in Non-Western Cultures. Vol. 2. Berlin: Springer. pp. 1699–1704.
