= Aranmula Mangattu Palace =

Coordinates: 9°19′44″N 76°41′24″E

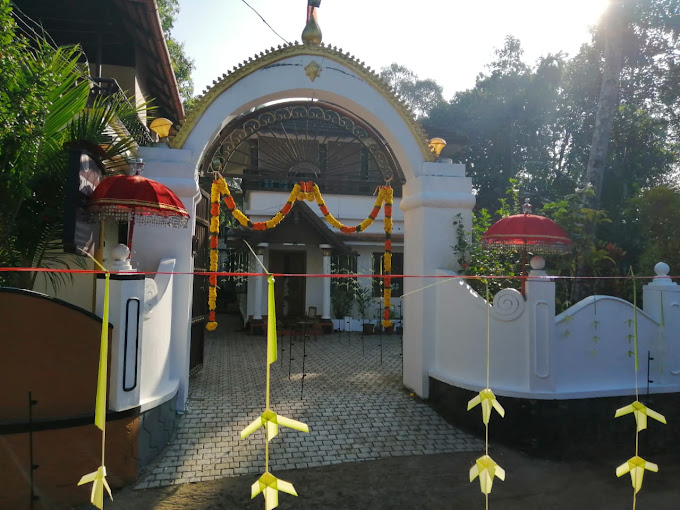
Mangattu Palace

Aranmula Mangattu Palace (Malayalam: ആറന്മുള മങ്ങാട്ട് കൊട്ടാരം) , locally known as Aranmula Kottaram, is a historic royal palace situated in Kerala, India. Built over a century ago, the palace holds cultural and historical significance. It is closely linked with the ceremonial traditions of the region, particularly those centered around historical and religious practices. The current royal families of Aranmula Palace continue to reside there, maintaining its legacy and connection to the region's heritage.

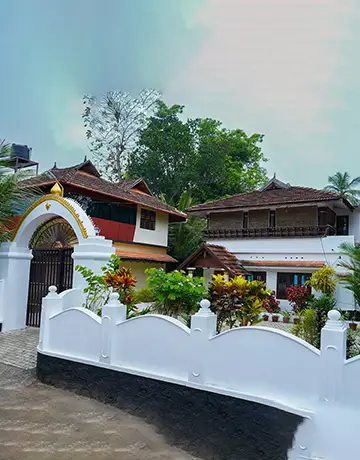
Aranmula Kottaram

== Architecture ==
Aranmula Mangattu Palace exemplifies traditional Kerala architecture, reflecting the craftsmanship and aesthetic values of the region. The palace's layout and design incorporate elements that align with ceremonial practices, especially during the Thiruvabharana Koshayathra.

== Historical and cultural importance ==
Aranmula Mangattu Palace plays a pivotal role during the sacred Thiruvabharana Koshayathra, a religious procession associated with the renowned Sabarimala Temple and the Pandalam Palace. This event involves the ceremonial transfer of the holy ornaments of Lord Ayyappa, known as the Thiruvabharanam. On the day the Thiruvabharanam reaches the palace, the sacred box is opened and displayed to devotees, allowing them to witness its divine contents. After Sabarimala and Perunad Sree Dharmasastha Temple, this is the only place where thiruvabharanam can be opened and displayed to devotees.

The palace's proximity to the Aranmula Sree Partha Sarathi Temple and the holy River Pampa enhances its spiritual and cultural importance. These landmarks contribute to the palace's role as a hub of religious activity and devotion.

== Ceremonial features ==
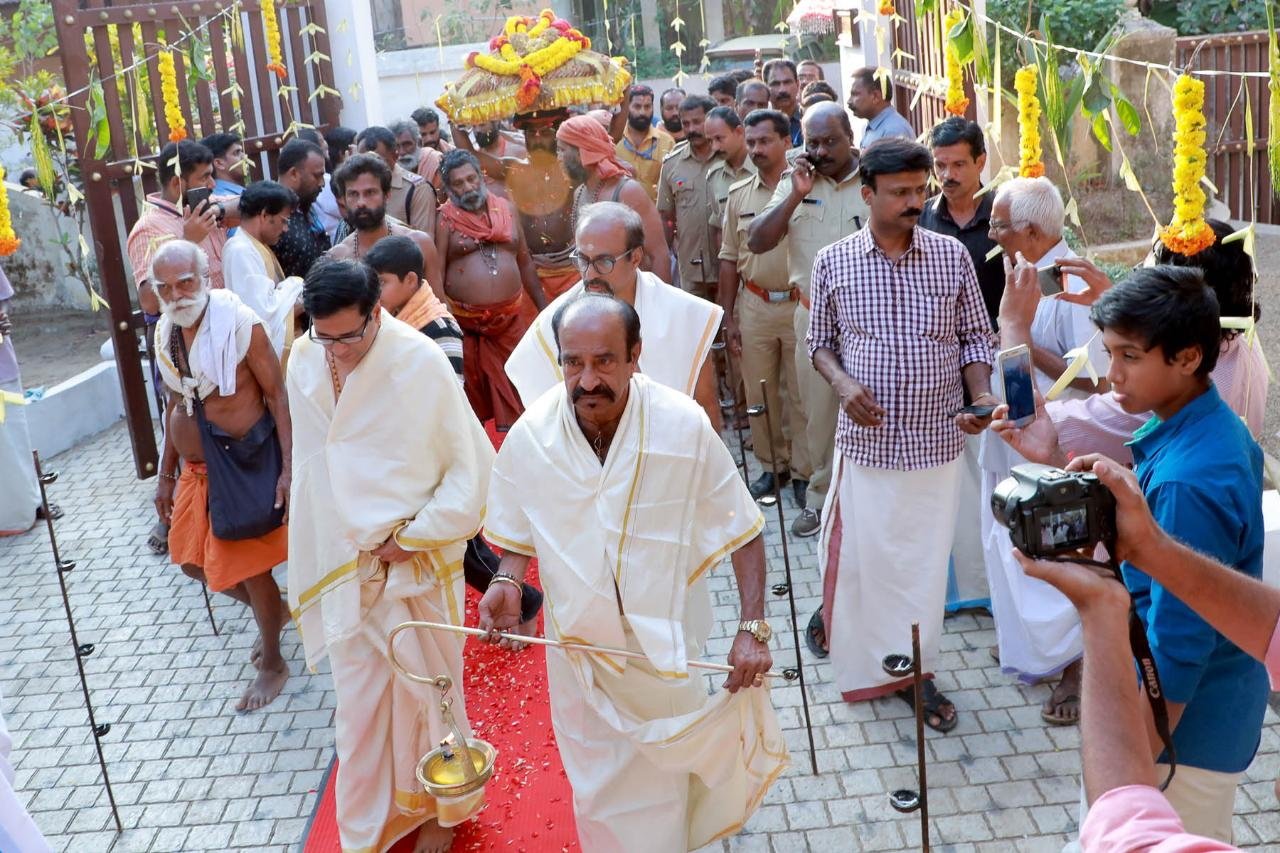
Procession of Thiruvabharanam

During the return procession of the Thiruvabharanam from Sabarimala to Pandalam Palace, the journey begins at Perunad Shasta Temple and follows the traditional Thiruvabharanam route. It passes through Ayiroor Puthiyakavu Devi Temple and Cherukol Subrahmanya Temple before reaching the Pampadimon Ayyappa Temple in Kozhencherry. After a break for lunch and rest, the procession resumes in the evening and arrives at Mangattu Palace, located near the eastern temple of Aranmula. Members of the Palace ceremonially receive the procession, and the team leading it places the sacred caskets inside the palace. The Thiruvabharanam casket is then opened in the evening, allowing devotees to have darshan. The group carrying the Thiruvabharanam stays overnight at the palace and departs the following morning, continuing the journey to Pandalam Palace.
