= The Kerala State Biodiversity Board =

Government body of Kerala, India

Kerala State Biodiversity Board
Agency overview
- Jurisdiction: Government of Kerala
- Headquarters: Kailasam, TC 24/3219, No. 43, Belhaven Gardens, Kowdiar P.O., Thiruvananthapuram – 695003, Kerala, India
- Minister responsible: Sunny Joseph, Minister for Environment
- Agency executives: Dr. N. Anil Kumar, Chairman; V. Balakrishnan, Member Secretary
- Parent agency: Government of Kerala
- Website: https://www.keralabiodiversity.org

Kerala State Biodiversity Board (KSBB) is one of the 28 state biodiversity boards set up by the National Biodiversity Authority in India. It is an autonomous body of the Government of Kerala.

KSBB headquarters is located at Thiruvananthapuram. The board falls under the provision of the State Biodiversity Act set up in 2008 and the Biological Diversity Act, 2002. The Board is headed by a Chairman, a Member Secretary and followed by a team of expert Government officials, leading the board in its activities. Dr. C George Thomas is the Chairman and Dr. A V Santhoshkumar is the Member Secretary of KSBB.

On 21 May 2014, on the eve of International Day for Biological Diversity KSBB dedicated a project of establishing 'Shanthisthals' (biodiversity hubs) to showcase the rich biodiversity of the state at universities and other institutions across the state of Kerala.
