= Aranmula =

- Village
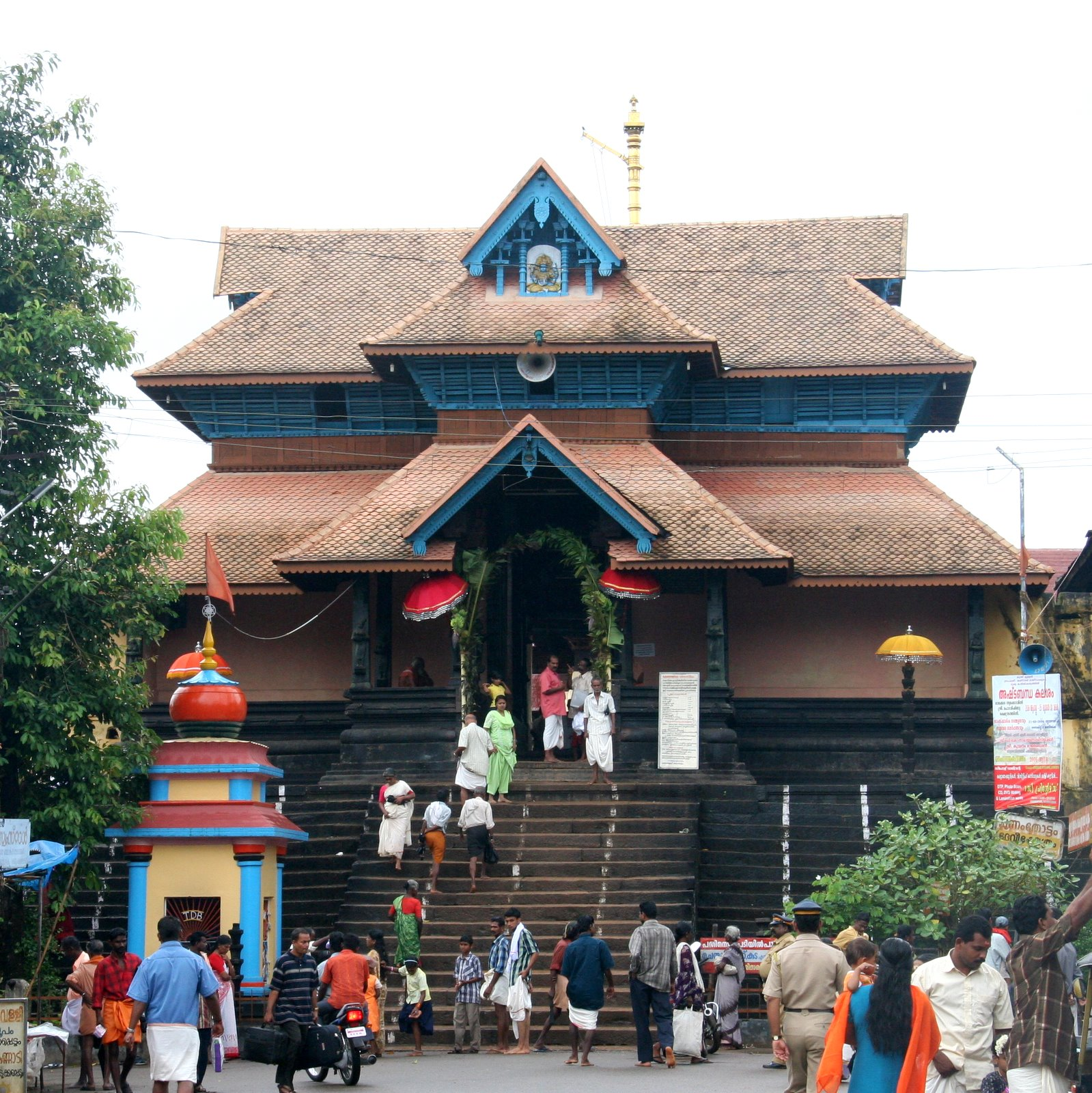
- Aranmula Parthasarathy Temple

- Location in Kerala, India Aranmula (India)
- Coordinates: 9.33°N 76.68°E
- Country: India
- State: Kerala
- District: Pathanamthitta
- Elevation: 7 m (23 ft)

Languages
  - Official: Malayalam, English
- Time zone: UTC+5:30 (IST)
- Postal code: 689533
- Vehicle registration: KL-03
- Nearest cities: Thiruvalla; Kozhencherry

Aranmula is a temple town located in Pathanamthitta district in Kerala, India.

== Temples ==
The Aranmula Parthasarathy Temple is one of the major temples in Kerala and has great antiquity. It is one of the venerated 108 Vaishnava temples in India and finds mention in Tamil classics. Spread over a vast area, the temple is on the banks of the Pampa, and the whole temple complex is at a high elevation. The main idol is of Lord Krishna, who is the charioteer of warrior Arjuna in the Kurukshetra War. The temple has a flight of 18 steps that lead to the Eastern Tower, while 57 descending steps from the Northern Tower reach the Pampa. The temple here has fine murals from the 18th century." Thanka Anki", the golden ornaments of Lord Ayyappa at Sabarimala are kept in Aranmula Sri Parthasarathy Temple.

== Aranmula Panchayat ==
Shija T. Toji was the president of the panchayat, while N. S. Kumar was the vice-president from 2020 to 2025. The new president and vice-president will take charge following the election in December 2025.

== Environmental Movements ==
The Ministry of Civil Aviation of the Government of India has issued a letter dated 25 May 2015 withdrawing the 'in-principle' approval to the proposed Aranmula Airport Project. The Civil Aviation Ministry has also forwarded copies of the letter withdrawing the approval for the airport project to the Prime Minister's Office, Rashtrapathi Bhavan, Ministry of Home Affairs, Defence Ministry, Planning Commission, Departments of Economic Affairs and Revenue, and the Project Monitoring Group at Vigyan Bhavan in New Delhi. Before this, on 8 May 2015, the Ministry of Defence withdrew the No Objection Certificate (NOC) to the project. Earlier, on 28 May 2014, the National Green Tribunal (NGT) had cancelled the environment clearance granted to the project by the Union Ministry of Environment and Forests.

== Notable people ==
- Sugathakumari, poet
- Thomas Philipose, Maha Vir Chakra Winner
- Aranmula Ponnamma, actress
- Sadhu Kochoonju Upadesi, Malayali preacher, poet, and composer

== See also ==
- Aranmula Boat Race
- Aranmula Kannadi
- തങ്കയങ്കി
- Aranmula International Airport
- Aranmula Palace
- Aranmula Puncha
- Kozhippalam
