= Kuttanad Assembly constituency =

Constituency of the Kerala legislative assembly in India

Kuttanad
- Constituency No. 106 for the Kerala Legislative Assembly
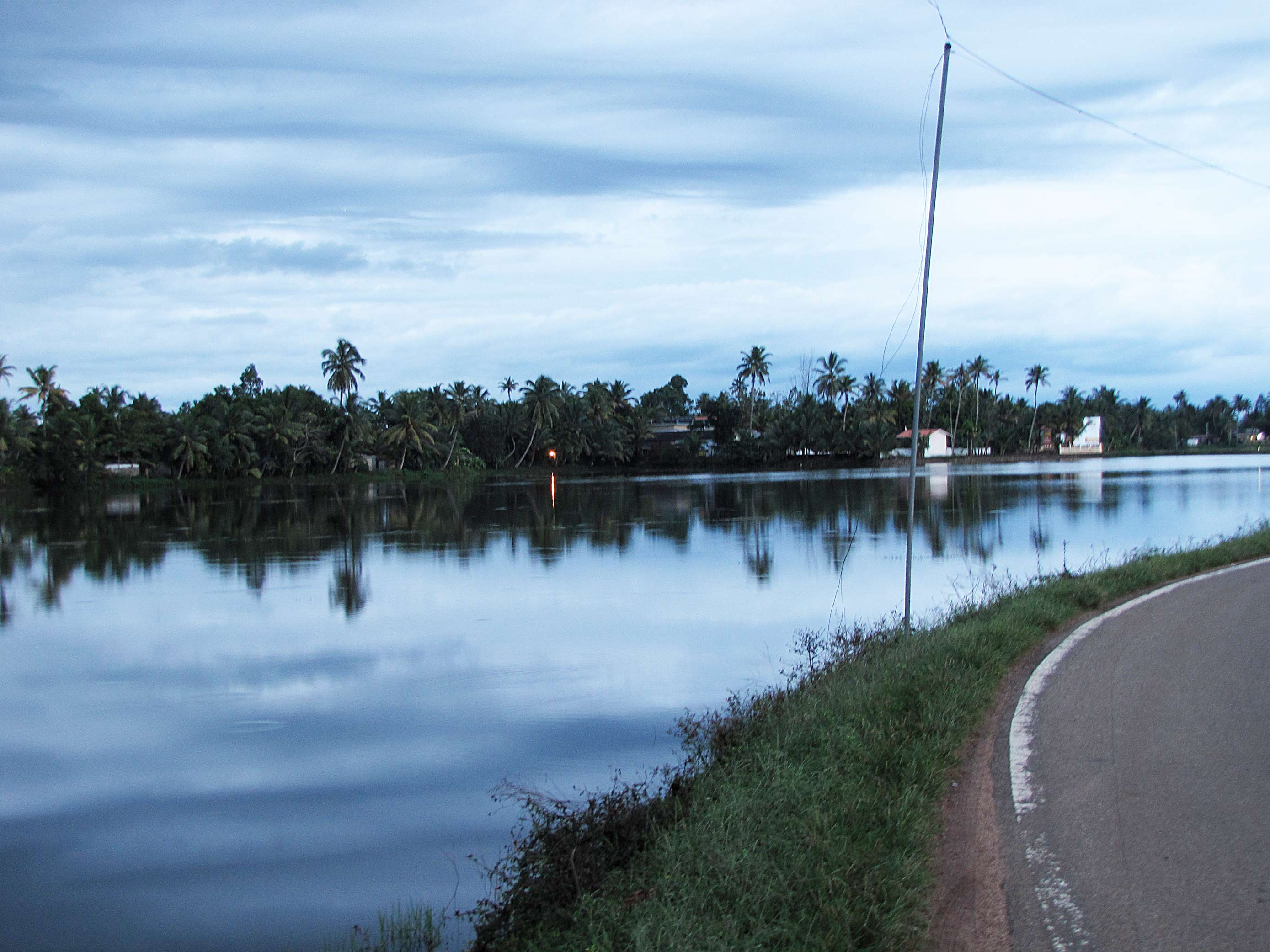
- Muttar village in Kuttanad Assembly constituency

Constituency details
- Country: India
- Region: South India
- State: Kerala
- District: Alappuzha
- Established: 1965
- Total electors: 1,65,172 (2016)
- Reservation: None

Member of Legislative Assembly
- 16th Kerala Legislative Assembly
- Incumbent Reji Cheriyan
- Party: Kerala Congress
- Elected year: 2026

Kuttanad State assembly constituency is one of the 140 state legislative assembly constituencies in Kerala in southern India. It is also one of the seven state legislative assembly constituencies included in Mavelikara Lok Sabha constituency.

== Local self-governed segments ==
Kuttanad Assembly constituency is composed of the following local self-governed segments:

Sl no.	Name	Status (Grama panchayat/Municipality)	Taluk
1	Champakulam	Grama panchayat	Kuttanad
2	Edathua	Grama panchayat	Kuttanad
3	Kainakary	Grama panchayat	Kuttanad
4	Kavalam	Grama panchayat	Kuttanad
5	Muttar	Grama panchayat	Kuttanad
6	Nedumudi	Grama panchayat	Kuttanad
7	Neelamperoor	Grama panchayat	Kuttanad
8	Pulinkunnoo	Grama panchayat	Kuttanad
9	Ramankary	Grama panchayat	Kuttanad
10	Thakazhy	Grama panchayat	Kuttanad
11	Thalavady	Grama panchayat	Kuttanad
12	Veliyanad	Grama panchayat	Kuttanad
13	Veeyapuram	Grama panchayat	Karthikappally

== Members of Legislative Assembly ==
Year	Member	Political party
1967	K. K. K. Pillai	Independent politician
1970	Oommen Thalavady	Socialist Party
1977	Eapen Kandakudy	Kerala Congress
1980	Oommen Mathew	Kerala Congress (Joseph)
1982	K. C. Joseph	Kerala Congress (Joseph)
1987	K. C. Joseph	Kerala Congress
1991	K. C. Joseph	Kerala Congress
1996	K. C. Joseph	Kerala Congress
2001	K. C. Joseph	Kerala Congress
2006	Thomas Chandy	Democratic Indira Congress
2011	Thomas Chandy	Nationalist Congress Party
2016 (Note: A by-election due to the vacancy caused by the incumbent MLA's death was cancelled per the Election Commission of India.)	Thomas Chandy	Nationalist Congress Party
2021	Thomas K. Thomas	Nationalist Congress Party
2026	Reji Cheriyan	Kerala Congress

== Brief election history ==
Election	Votes polled	Winner				Runner-up 1				Runner-up 2				Margin of victory	
Year		Name	Party	Votes		Name	Party	Votes		Name	Party	Votes		Votes	Percent
2016	130082 (78.76%)	Thomas Chandy	NCP	50114	38.52%	Jacob Abraham	KC(M)	45223	34.76%	Subash Vasu	BDJS	33044	25.40%	4891	3.76%
2011	118110 (78.63%)	Thomas Chandy	NCP	60010	50.81%	K. C. Joseph	KC(M)	52039	44.06%	K. Soman	BJP	4395	3.72%	7971	6.75%
Major delimitation of constituency
2006	83460 (75.16%)	Thomas Chandy	DIC	42109	50.45%	K. C. Joseph	KEC	36728	44.01%	Thomas	Ind.	1553	1.86%	5381	6.44%
2001	84639 (71.02%)	K. C. Joseph	KEC	44534	52.62%	Oommen Mathew	KEC(J)	34144	40.34%	A. K. Chacko	BJP	4243	5.01%	10390	12.28%
1996	87889 (73.10%)	K. C. Joseph	KEC	44532	50.67%	J. Joseph	INC	40447	46.02%	G. Mohandas	BJP	2602	2.96%	4085	4.65%
1991	86408 (73.07%)	K. C. Joseph	KEC	45669	52.85%	P. D. Luke	KC(M)	36673	42.44%	S. Radhakrishnan	BJP	3107	3.60%	8996	10.41%
1987	85551 (84.41%)	K. C. Joseph	KEC	41096	48.04%	M. M. Anthony	CPI(M)	37833	44.22%	V. S. Vijayakumar	BJP	5462	6.38%	3263	3.82%
1982	71356 (80.69%)	K. C. Joseph	KC(J)	37172	52.09%	G. Suchakaran Nair	CPI(M)	34184	47.91%	Only two candidates contested				2988	4.18%
1980	70772 (78.09%)	Oommen Mathew	KC(J)	37346	52.77%	K. P. Joseph	CPI(M)	33256	46.99%	Mathew J. Pallithanam	Ind.	170	0.24%	4090	5.78%
1977	64686 (83.23%)	Eapen Kandakudy	KEC	34161	52.81%	K. P. Joseph	CPI(M)	27014	41.76%	K. Ravu	Ind.	3054	4.72%	7147	11.05%
Major delimitation of constituency
1970	57606 (77.67%)	Oommen Thalavady	SP	27372	47.52%	Thomas John	KEC	21866	37.96%	P. N. Padmanabhan	RSP	7743	13.44%	5506	9.56%
1967	48938 (79.15%)	K. K. K. Pillai	Ind.	23797	48.63%	T. John	KEC	16633	33.93%	M. C. Joseph	INC	8508	17.39%	7164	14.70%
1965	49124 (76.46%)	Thomas John	KEC	25319	51.54%	V. Z. Job	INC	15067	30.67%	Sonney Sebastian	Ind.	7684	15.64%	10252	20.87%

== Detailed election results ==
Percentage change (±%) denotes the change in the number of votes from the immediate previous election.

=== 2026 ===
2026 Kerala Legislative Assembly election: Kuttanad
Party	Candidate	Votes	%	±%
KEC	Reji Cheriyan	56,594	50.28	▲9.00
NCP-SP	Thomas K. Thomas	35,994	31.98	▼13.69
BDJS	Santhosh Shanthi	16,932	15.04	▲3.14
AAP	Roy Muttar	689	0.61	
NOTA	None of the above	713	0.63	▲0.22
Margin of victory		20,600	18.30	▲13.91
Turnout		1,12,560		
KEC gain from NCP		Swing	▲9.00	

=== 2021 ===
There were 1,67,970 eligible voters in Kuttanad Assembly constituency for the 2021 Kerala Assembly election.

2021 Kerala Legislative Assembly election: Kuttanad
Party	Candidate	Votes	%	±%
NCP	Thomas K. Thomas	57,379	45.67	▲7.15
KEC	Jacob Abraham	51,863	41.28	▲6.52
BDJS	Thampi Mettuthara	14,946	11.90	▼13.5
DSJP	Vinu	533	0.42	
NOTA	None of the above	523	0.41	▼0.16
SUCI(C)	Biju Xavier	392	0.31	▲0.02
Margin of victory		5,516	4.39	▲0.63
Turnout		1,25,636	74.80	▼3.96
NCP hold		Swing	▲7.15	

=== 2016 ===
There were 1,65,172 eligible voters in Kuttanad Assembly constituency for the 2016 Kerala Assembly election.

==== Results by party ====
2016 Kerala Legislative Assembly election: Kuttanad
Party	Candidate	Votes	%	±%
NCP	Thomas Chandy	50,114	38.52	▼12.29
KC(M)	Jacob Abraham	45,223	34.76	▼9.30
BDJS	Subash Vasu	33,044	25.40	▲21.68
SUCI(C)	Nandanan Valiyaparambu	371	0.29	▼0.03
BSP	Sunny Pathinaril	354	0.27	▼0.32
NOTA	None of the above	346	0.27	▲0.27
Independent	Jose Koippally	263	0.20	–
Independent	Jacob Abraham Panavelil	262	0.20	–
Independent	Mohanan	105	0.08	–
Margin of victory		4,891	3.76	▼2.99
Turnout		1,30,082	78.76	▲0.13
NCP hold		Swing	▼12.29	

==== Results by local self-governed segment ====
The results of 2016 Assembly election for each self-governed segment is as follows:

No.	Segment	Valid votes							Lead	Alliance	Margin of lead	
No.	Segment	Valid votes	UDF Votes		LDF Votes		NDA Votes		Lead	Alliance	Margin of lead	
1	Kainakary	11966	3406	28.46%	5516	46.10%	2899	24.23%	Thomas Chandy	LDF	2110	17.64%
2	Kavalam	8894	2276	25.59%	3658	41.13%	2803	31.52%	Thomas Chandy	LDF	855	9.61%
3	Neelamperoor	8694	2450	28.18%	3259	37.49%	2855	32.84%	Thomas Chandy	LDF	404	4.65%
4	Veliyanad	8370	3250	38.83%	2700	32.26%	2344	28.00%	Jacob Abraham	UDF	550	6.57%
5	Pulinkunnoo	13060	4613	35.32%	4288	32.83%	4022	30.80%	Jacob Abraham	UDF	325	2.49%
6	Nedumudi	12386	4506	36.38%	5256	42.44%	2490	20.10%	Thomas Chandy	LDF	750	6.06%
7	Champakulam	9791	4061	41.48%	3098	31.64%	2427	24.79%	Jacob Abraham	UDF	963	9.84%
8	Ramankary	8234	2969	36.06%	3385	41.11%	1766	21.45%	Thomas Chandy	LDF	416	5.05%
9	Muttar	5760	2315	40.19%	2058	35.73%	1290	22.40%	Jacob Abraham	UDF	257	4.46%
10	Thalavady	12031	3701	30.76%	4738	39.38%	3448	28.66%	Thomas Chandy	LDF	1037	8.62%
11	Edathua	11879	5671	47.74%	3722	31.33%	2353	19.81%	Jacob Abraham	UDF	1949	16.41%
12	Thakazhy	11263	3262	28.96%	5070	45.01%	2797	24.83%	Thomas Chandy	LDF	1808	16.05%
13	Veeyapuram	7375	2618	35.50%	3189	43.24%	1476	20.01%	Thomas Chandy	LDF	571	7.74%
Postal votes		379	125	32.98%	177	46.70%	74	19.53%	Thomas Chandy	LDF	52	13.72%
TOTAL		130082	45223	34.76%	50114	38.52%	33044	25.40%	Thomas Chandy	LDF	4891	3.76%

=== 2011 ===
There were 1,50,213 eligible voters in Kuttanad Assembly constituency for the 2011 Kerala Assembly election.

2011 Kerala Legislative Assembly election: Kuttanad
Party	Candidate	Votes	%	±%
NCP	Thomas Chandy	60,010	50.81	▲6.80
KC(M)	K. C. Joseph	52,039	44.06	▼6.39
BJP	K. Soman	4,395	3.72	▲2.05
BSP	Shibu Vadakkettom	697	0.59	
SUCI(C)	P. R. Satheesan	373	0.32	
Independent	Joseph	361	0.31	
Independent	Asok Kumar	235	0.20	
Margin of victory		7,971	6.75	▲0.31
Turnout		1,18,110	78.63	▲3.47
NCP gain from DIC		Swing	▲6.80	

=== 2006 ===
There were 1,11,059 eligible voters in Kuttanad Assembly constituency for the 2006 Kerala Assembly election.

2006 Kerala Legislative Assembly election: Kuttanad
Party	Candidate	Votes	%	±%
DIC	Thomas Chandy	42,109	50.45	▲10.11
KEC	K. C. Joseph	36,728	44.01	▼8.61
Independent	Thomas	1,553	1.86	
BJP	T. K. Aravindakshan	1,393	1.67	▼3.34
Independent	V. R. Anil	707	0.85	
Independent	M. J. Alex	498	0.60	
Independent	K. D. Joseph	186	0.22	
Independent	Joseph	169	0.20	
Independent	Abraham Haijia	117	0.14	
Invalid	Invalidated Votes	16		
Margin of victory		5,381	6.44	▼5.84
Turnout		83,476	75.16	▲4.14
DIC gain from KEC		Swing	▲10.11	

=== 2001 ===
There were 1,19,188 eligible voters in Kuttanad Assembly constituency for the 2001 Kerala Assembly election.

2001 Kerala Legislative Assembly election: Kuttanad
Party	Candidate	Votes	%	±%
KEC	K. C. Joseph	44,534	52.62	▲1.95
KC(J)	Prof. Oommen Mathew	34,144	40.34	▼5.68
BJP	A. K. Chacko	4,243	5.01	▲2.05
Independent	P. R. Satheesan	1,718	2.03	
Invalid	Invalidated Votes	10		
Margin of victory		10,390	12.28	▲7.63
Turnout		84,649	71.02	▼2.43
KEC hold		Swing	▲1.95	

=== 1996 ===
There were 1,22,708 eligible voters in Kuttanad Assembly constituency for the 1996 Kerala Assembly election.

1996 Kerala Legislative Assembly election: Kuttanad
Party	Candidate	Votes	%	±%
KEC	K. C. Joseph	44,532	50.67	▼0.53
INC	J. Joseph	40,447	46.02	▲4.91
BJP	G. Mohandas	2,602	2.96	▼0.42
Independent	K. C. Sunny	130	0.15	
Independent	Thomas Antony	110	0.13	
Independent	Mohan Jose	68	0.08	
Rejected	Rejected & Missing Votes	2,246		
Margin of victory		4,085	4.65	▼5.44
Turnout		90,135	73.45	▲0.13
KEC hold		Swing	▼0.53	

=== 1991 ===
There were 1,21,633 eligible voters in Kuttanad Assembly constituency for the 1991 Kerala Assembly election.

1991 Kerala Legislative Assembly election: Kuttanad
Party	Candidate	Votes	%	±%
KEC	K. C. Joseph	45,669	51.20	
KC(M)	P. D. Luke	36,673	41.11	
BJP	S. Radhakrishnan	3,017	3.38	
Independent	K. C. Luke	959	1.07	
Invalid	Invalidated Votes	2,874		
Margin of victory		8,996	10.09	
Turnout		89,192	73.32	
LDF gain from UDF		Swing		

== See also ==
- Kuttanad
- Alappuzha district
- List of constituencies of the Kerala Legislative Assembly
- 2016 Kerala Legislative Assembly election
