= Oommen (surname) =

Oommen is a Syrian Christian surname from Kerala corresponding to the given name Oommen. It may refer to:

- John Oommen, Indian-Canadian computer scientist
- Lucy Oommen, Indian gynecologist
- Mathew Oommen, Prominent Telecom Executive
- Philip Oommen, or Philipose Mar Chrysostom (1918–2021), senior Metropolitan Bishop of the Mar Thoma Church
- T. K. Oommen, Indian sociologist
- Thomas K. Oommen, bishop in the church of South India
- Rigin Oommen, Engineer, Red Hat Inc.
