= List of Protestant missionary societies =

The following list of Protestant missionary societies is a list of Protestant Christian missionary organizations that began between 1691 and 1900.

== Missionary societies in the United Kingdom ==
- 1649 New England Company
- 1691 Christian Faith Society for the West Indies
- 1698 Society for Promoting Christian Knowledge
- 1701 Society for the Propagation of the Gospel in Foreign Parts
- 1709 Society in Scotland for the Propagation of Christian Knowledge
- 1732 Moravian Missions
- 1792 Baptist Missionary Society
- 1795 London Missionary Society
- 1796 Scottish Missionary Society
- 1799 Church Missionary Society
- 1799 Religious Tract Society
- 1804 British and Foreign Bible Society
- 1809 London Society for Promoting Christianity Amongst the Jews (now known as the Church's Ministry Among Jewish People or CMJ)
- 1813 Wesleyan Missionary Society
- 1817 General Baptist Missionary Society
- 1823 Colonial and Continental Church Society
- 1825 Church of Scotland Mission Boards
- 1825 National Bible Society of Scotland
- 1831 Trinitarian Bible Society
- 1832 Wesleyan Ladies' Auxiliary for Female Education in Foreign Countries
- 1835 United Secession (afterwards United Presbyterian) Foreign Missions
- 1836 Colonial Missionary Society a.k.a. Commonwealth Missionary Society
- 1840 Irish Presbyterian Missionary Society
- 1840 Welsh Calvinistic Methodist Missionary Society
- 1841 Colonial Bishoprics Fund
- 1841 Edinburgh Medical Missionary Society
- 1843 British Society for the Propagation of the Gospel Among the Jews
- 1843 Free Church of Scotland Missions
- 1843 Primitive Methodist African and Colonial Missions
- 1843 Methodist New Connexion in England Foreign Missions
- 1844 South American Missionary Society
- 1847 Presbyterian Church in England Foreign Missions
- 1858 Christian Vernacular Education Society for India
- 1859 Finnish Missionary Society
- 1860 Central African Mission of the English Universities
- 1865 China Inland Mission
- 1865 Friends' Foreign Mission Association
- 1866 Delhi Female Medical Mission
- 1867 Friends' Mission in Syria and Palestine
- 1877 Cambridge Mission to Delhi
- 1880 Church of England Zenana Missionary Society
- 1884 Presbyterian Mission to Korea
- 1892 Student Volunteer Missionary Union

== Missionary societies in the United States and Canada ==
- 1733 Corporation for the Propagation of the Gospel in New England
- 1773 unnamed project for propagating the Gospel to African Guinea with the help of former slaves organized by Ezra Stiles and Samuel Hopkins, its operations apparently disrupted by the American Revolutionary War
- 1787 Society for Propagating the Gospel Among the Indians at Boston
- 1795 Friends' Missionary Society
- 1800 New York Missionary Society
- 1800 Connecticut Missionary Society for Indians
- 1803 United States Mission to the Cherokees
- 1806 Western Missionary Society for Indians
- 1810 American Board of Commissioners for Foreign Missions
- 1814 American Baptist Missionary Union (later known as American Baptist Foreign Mission Society and then American Baptist International Ministries)
- c. 1818 Female Missionary Society
- 1819 Methodist Episcopal Church Missionary Society
- 1826 American Home Missionary Society
- 1832 American Baptist Home Mission Society
- 1833 Free-will Baptist Foreign Missionary Society in India
- 1835 Protestant Episcopal Church Mission
- 1837 Board of Foreign Missions of the Presbyterian Church (North)
- 1837 Evangelical Lutheran Foreign Missionary Society
- 1842 Seventh Day Baptist Missionary Society
- 1842 Strict Baptist Missionary Society
- 1843 Baptist Free Missionary Society
- 1845 Methodist Episcopal Church (South)
- 1845 Southern Baptist Convention
- 1846 American Missionary Association
- 1849 American Christian Missionary Society
- 1857 Board of Foreign Missions of (Dutch) Reformed Church
- 1859 Board of Foreign Missions of United Presbyterian Church
- 1861 Woman's Union Missionary Society of America for Heathen Lands
- 1862 Board of Foreign Missions of the Presbyterian Church (South)
- 1869 Woman's Foreign Missionary Society of the Methodist Episcopal Church
- 1874 Christian Woman's Board of Missions
- 1876 Foreign Christian Missionary Society
- 1878 Evangelical Association Missionary Society
- 1879 Woman's Foreign Missionary Society of the Methodist Protestant Church
- 1882 Woman's Foreign Missionary Society of the Free Methodist Church of North America
- 1886 Student Volunteer Missionary Union

== Missionary societies in Australia and New Zealand ==
- 1864 Australian Baptist Missionary Society
- 1885 New Zealand Baptist Missionary Society
- 1892 Open Air Campaigners

== Missionary societies in Continental Europe ==
- 1799 Rhenish Missionary Society
- 1815 Basel Mission
- 1821 Danish Missionary Society
- 1836 North German Missionary Society
- 1859 Finnish Missionary Society
- Liebenzell Mission

== See also ==
- List of Protestant missionary societies in China 1807-1953
- Timeline of Christian missions
- List of women's missionary societies
