= Thomas Chandy =

Businessman politician and businessman (1947–2019)

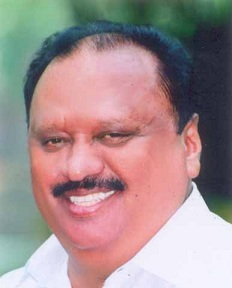

Minister for Transport, Government of Kerala
- In office 1 April 2017 – 15 November 2017
- Preceded by: A. K. Saseendran
- Succeeded by: A. K. Saseendran

Member of the Kerala Legislative Assembly
- In office 11 May 2006 – 20 December 2019
- Constituency: Kuttanad

Personal details
- Born: 29 October 1947 Chennamkary, Kingdom of Travancore, Dominion of India (present day Alappuzha, Kerala, India)
- Died: 20 December 2019 (aged 72) Kadavanthra, Kochi, Kerala, India
- Party: Nationalist Congress Party
- Spouse: Mercy Chandy
- Children: 3
- Relatives: Thomas K. Thomas (brother)

Thomas Chandy (29 October 1947 – 20 December 2019) was an Indian businessman and politician. He was a member of the Kerala Legislative Assembly from the Kuttanad constituency, the transport minister of the state of Kerala, and president of the Nationalist Congress Party in Kerala. He resigned from the minister's office on 15 November 2017 after an allegation regarding his resort in Alappuzha arose. He died in Kochi on 20 December 2019 from cancer.

== Personal life ==
Thomas Chandy was born on 29 October 1947, one of the sons of V. C. Thomas and Aleyamma Thomas at Chennamkary. He was educated at Devamatha High School in Chennamkary, St. Mary's HS Kainakary and at Leo XIII English Medium School in Alappuzha. He had a diploma in Telecommunication Engineering from the Institute of Engineering Technology, Alleppey. He was married to Mercy Chandy.

=== Death ===
Chandy died from cancer on 20 December 2019, at age 72.

== Political career ==
He started his political career in the KSU and was later selected as the President of the KSU and Youth Congress in Kuttanad, in 1970. After re-entering politics actively, he aligned himself with the DIC(K) of which he was the lone MLA as a part of the UDF in the 2006 elections, which later merged with the NCP and then aligned with the LDF for the 2011 elections. Based on the declaration of assets filed at the time of the elections, he was the richest MLA in the Assembly with assets of over 920 million Indian rupees.

Election Victories
Year	Closest rival	Votes polled
2006	Dr. KC Joseph KEC	42,109
2011	Dr. KC Joseph (KEC-M)	60,010
2016	Jacob Abraham (KC-M)	50,114

== Business career ==
Chandy had interests in the fields of education and hospitality among others. He was the Chairman of the United Indian School, Indian Public School, Indian Central School, and in 2019, United International Indian School in Kuwait. He also ran Al-Alia International Indian School in Riyadh, Saudi Arabia. Chandy also owned a controlling interest in the Lake Palace Resort, located on the Punamada Lake in Kerala.

== Allegations ==
A media report alleged that Chandy did not declare his true property value in the affidavit submitted to the Election Commission of India. He was accused of encroachment on Punnamada Lake at his resort in Alappuzha by keeping buoys afloat. It was later found by the District Collector that he had attained the necessary permissions from the government authorities in the state to keep the buoys afloat to keep waste away from the resort. It was also found that no one had complained about mobility rights within the buoy area over the years.

An allegation was raised against Chandy in October 2017 that he constructed a resort and a road to it illegally by filling in a water channel and paddy field in the ecologically fragile lower Kuttanad region. Initial reports from the district administration went against him and, as of August 2018, the probe was still going on.

== Social activism ==
He was a social worker both in Kuwait and Kerala. In Kuwait, he was involved with a waste disposal and cleanup campaign in a suburb mainly inhabited by expatriates from Kerala. He also intervened in the case of Indian nurses who were duped in a job racket which promised them jobs in government hospitals in Kuwait.

Chandy was the chairman of the Daveedputhra Charitable Society, which has been involved in building houses and providing sanitation facilities, health care and educational assistance, and other services.
