= Reji Cheriyan =

Indian politician

Member of the Kerala Legislative Assembly
- Incumbent
- Assumed office May 2026
- Preceded by: Thomas K. Thomas
- Constituency: Kuttanad

Personal details
- Born: Reji Cheriyan; 1968 (age 57–58) Alappuzha district, Kerala, India
- Party: Kerala Congress
- Parent: Cheriyan Philipose (father)
- Occupation: Politician, Businessman

Reji Cheriyan (born 1968) is an Indian politician representing the Kuttanad constituency in the Kerala Legislative Assembly. He was elected in May 2026, defeating the incumbent representative in a closely contested election.

== Political career ==
Reji Cheriyan has been an active participant in the political landscape of Alappuzha district. In the 2026 Kerala Legislative Assembly election, he was nominated by the Kerala Congress to contest from Kuttanad. His campaign focused on agricultural welfare, particularly the challenges faced by paddy farmers in the region, and water management infrastructure.

In the final tally, Cheriyan secured a victory by a margin of 8,422 votes over his nearest rival, Thomas K. Thomas of the NCP-SP.

== Election results ==
=== 2026 Kerala Legislative Assembly election ===
Party	Candidate	Votes	%	±%	
	Kerala Congress	Reji Cheriyan	62,415	46.12	+10.45
	NCP-SP	Thomas K. Thomas	53,993	39.90	-5.72
	BDJS	Santhosh Shanthiram	14,821	10.95	-2.10
Margin of victory		8,422	6.22		
Total valid votes		1,35,329			
Kerala Congress gain from NCP		Swing	+8.08		
