= P. N. Panicker =

Indian literacy advocate (1909–1995)

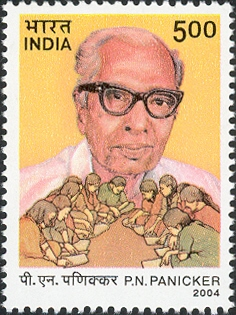
Panicker on a 2004 stamp of India

Puthuvayil Narayana Panicker (1 March 1909 – 19 June 1995) is known as the Father of the Library Movement in the Indian state of Kerala. The activities of the Kerala Grandhasala Sangham that he initiated triggered a popular cultural movement in Kerala which produced universal literacy in the state in the 1990s.

June 19, his death anniversary, has been observed in Kerala as Vayanadinam (Reading Day) since 1996. The Department of Education in Kerala also observes Vayana varam (Reading Week) for a week from June 19 to 25.

In 2017, Indian Prime Minister Narendra Modi declared June 19, Kerala's Reading Day, as National Reading Day in India. The following month is also observed as National Reading Month in India.

== Early life ==
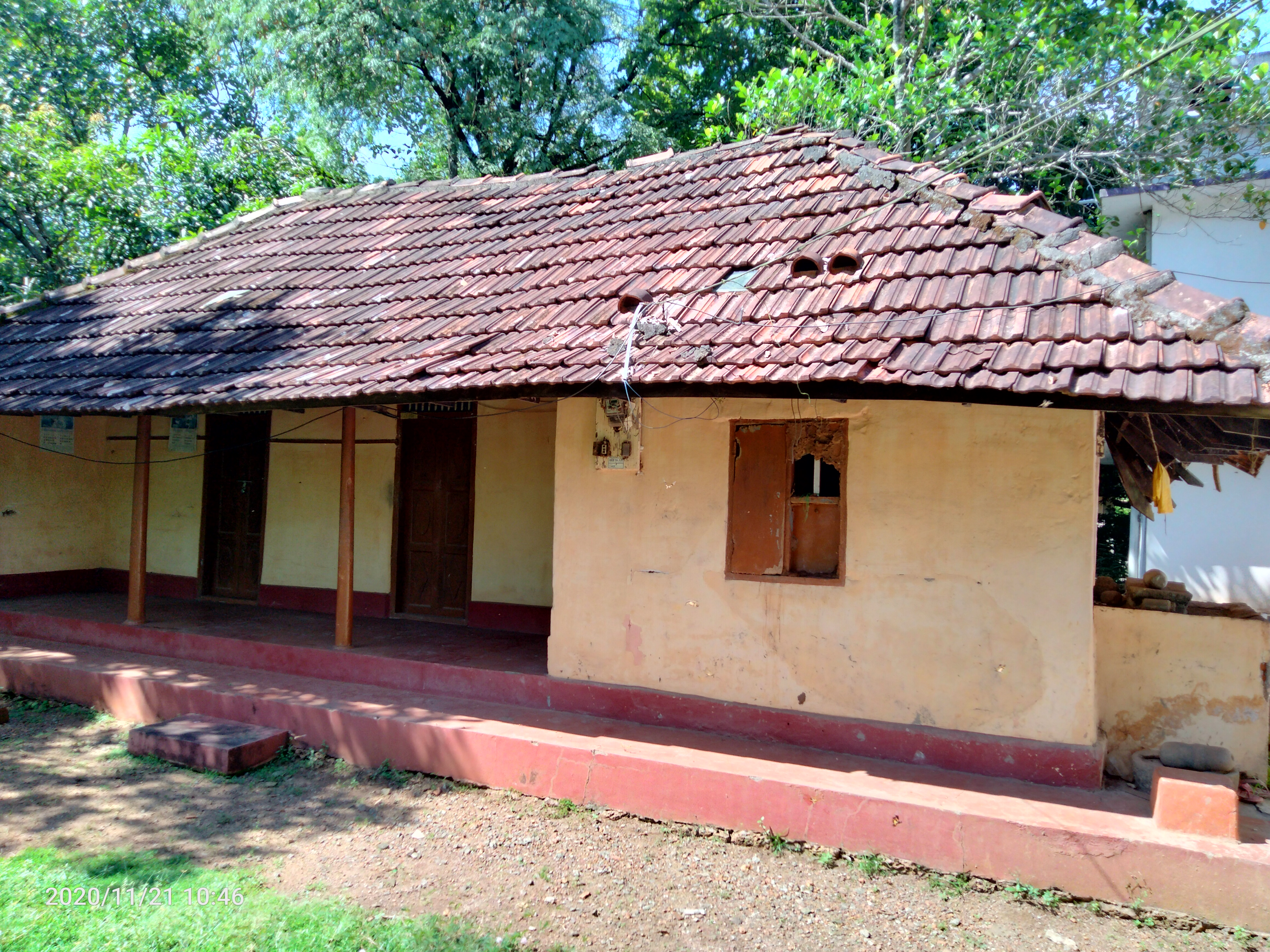
Childhood house of P. N. Panicker at Neelamperoor

Panicker was born in a marar family on 1909 March 1 to Govinda Pillai and Janaky Amma at Neelamperoor, India. In 1926 he started the Sanadanadharmam Library as a teacher in his hometown. He was a teacher and his influence on society was much greater than many of his time.

== Contributions ==
Panicker led the formation of Thiruvithaamkoor Granthasala Sangham (Travancore Library Association) in 1945 with 47 rural libraries. The slogan of the organization was 'Read and Grow'. Later on, with the formation of Kerala State in 1956, it became Kerala Granthasala Sangham (KGS). He traveled to the villages of Kerala proclaiming the value of reading. He succeeded in bringing some 6,000 libraries into this network. Grandhasala Sangham won the ‘Krupsakaya Award’ from UNESCO in 1975. Panicker was the General Secretary of Sangham for 32 years, until 1977, when it was taken over by the State Government. It became the Kerala State Library Council, with an in-built democratic structure and funding.

== KANFED ==
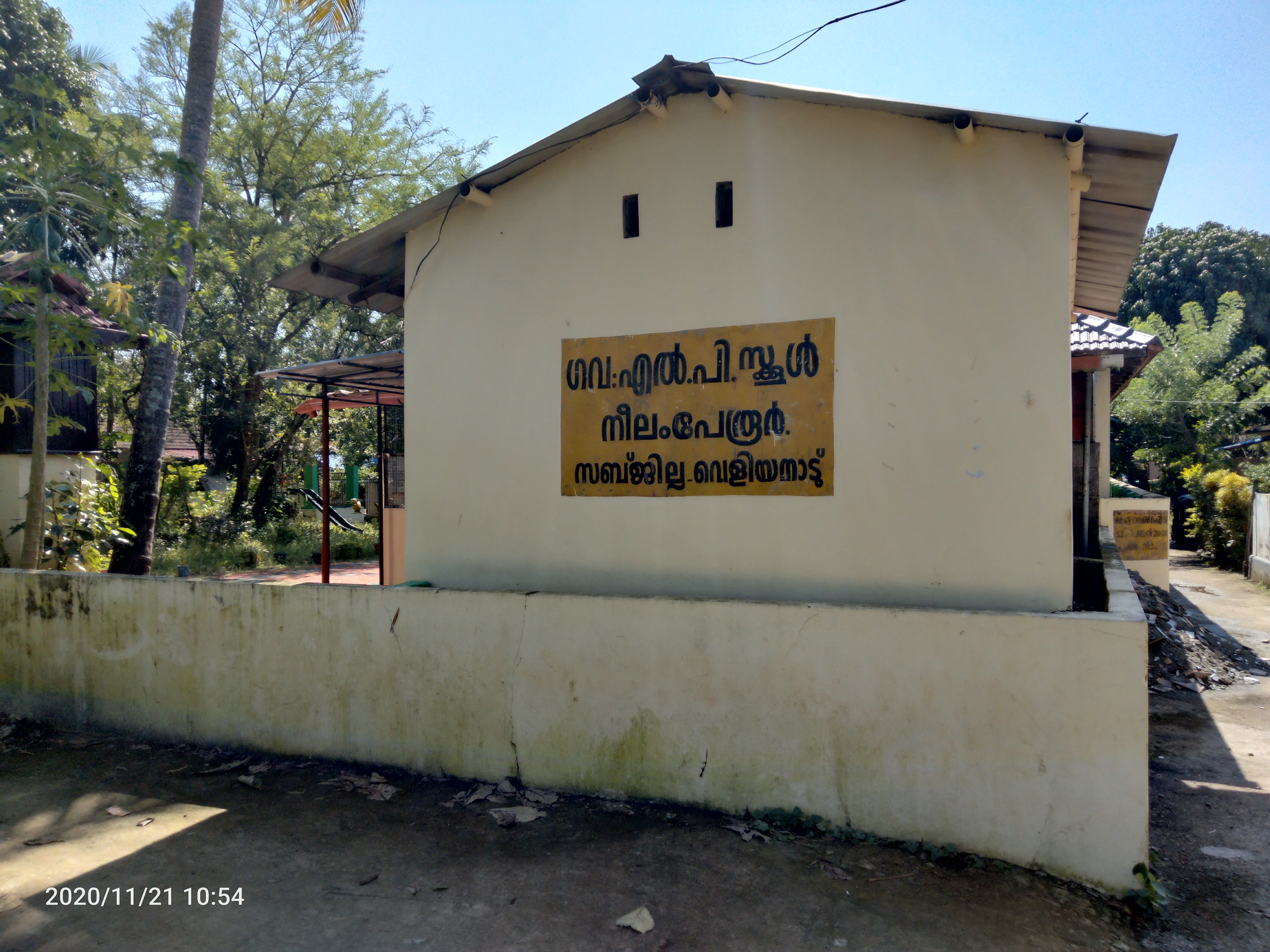
GLPS Neelamperoor where P. N. Panicker worked for years

After his organization was taken over by the State, Panicker became subj

== Legacy ==
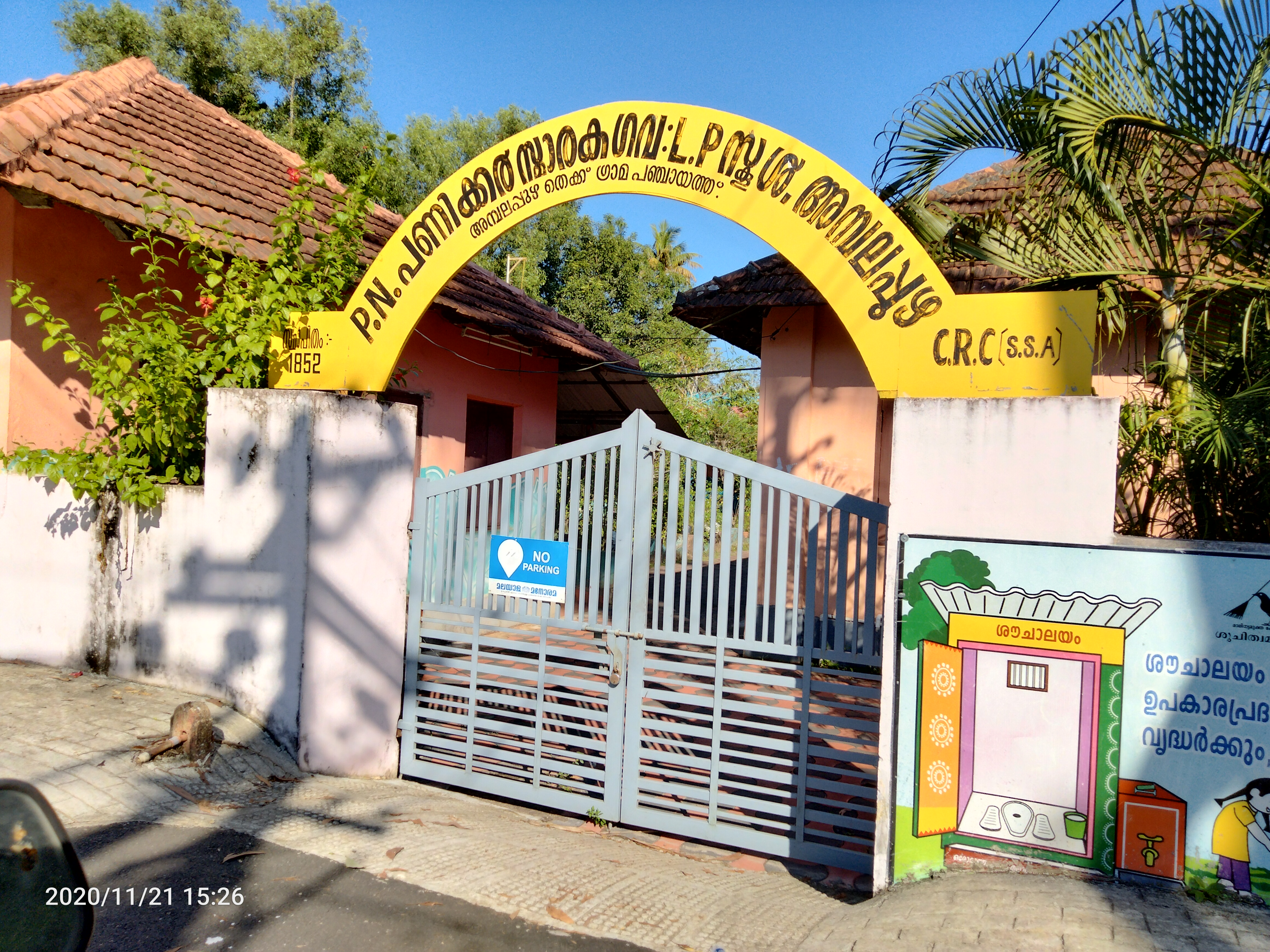
P. N. Panicker Memorial School at Ambalappuzha

Panicker died on 19 June 1995, at age 86. The Government of Kerala acknowledged his contributions and ordered that 19 June be observed, annually, as Vaayanadinam (Reading Day) with a week-long series of activities at schools and public institutions to honor his contributions to the cause of literacy, education and library movement.

The Department of Posts honored Panicker by issuing a commemorative postage stamp on 21 June 2004.

His birth centenary was celebrated under the auspices of the P. N. Panicker Foundation in 2010.

The Government of Kerala observes 19th June as the 'Day of Reading' in the memory of P.N. Panicker.

To honour P.N. Panicker’s legacy, the P.N. Panicker Foundation is organized a month- long celebration of reading and literacy activities from 19th June to 18th July, 2026. The event sought to inculcate Reading and Digital reading habit among the school students and underprivileged population throughout the country leading to universalization of education.
