= Undefined =

Undefined may refer to:

== Mathematics ==
- Undefined (mathematics), with several related meanings
  - Indeterminate form, in calculus

== Computing ==
- Undefined behavior, computer code whose behavior is not specified under certain conditions
- Undefined value, a condition where an expression does not have a correct value
- Undefined variable, a variable that is accessed in code but has not been declared

== Other uses ==
- Undefined, something that lacks any definition
- Undefined citizenship, a post-Soviet form of statelessness in Estonia

== See also ==
- Null (disambiguation)
- Void (disambiguation)
- Invalid (disambiguation)
- Definition (disambiguation)
- Definable (disambiguation)
