= St. Stephen's Hospital, Delhi =

St Stephen's Hospital
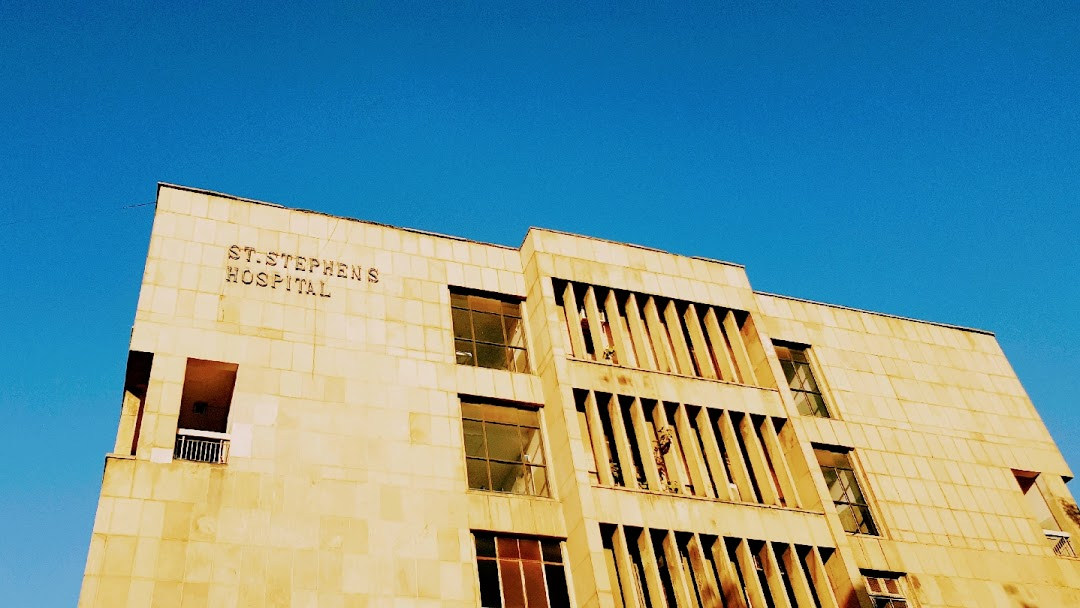
- St. Stephen's Hospital, Delhi

Geography
- Location: St. Stephen's Hospital Marg, Tis Hazari, Central Delhi, Delhi - 110054

Organisation
- Type: Teaching
- Affiliated university: National Board of Examinations for Medical Postgraduate Courses Guru Gobind Singh Indraprastha University for Nursing Courses

Services
- Emergency department: Yes
- Beds: 600

History
- Founded: 1885; 141 years ago

Links
- Website: www.ststephenshospital.org

St Stephen's Hospital Delhi is a private hospital in New Delhi, India. The hospital has 600 beds and currently functions as a superspecialty tertiary care center.

== History ==
The institution started as a dispensary in 1876 by the Delhi Female Medical Mission, on the banks of river Yamuna. The hospital was later established in 1885 as a small facility in Chandni Chowk and opened by Lady Dufferin, Vicereine of India. It was the first hospital for women and children.

The hospital was started as a 50-bed facility in Chandni Chowk, overlooking Queen's Gardens (today known as Mahatma Gandhi Memorial Park or Azad Park in Old Delhi), formerly known as Company Bagh (or originally called Begum ka Bagh and belonged to Jahanara Begum), located near the Town Hall in Chandni Chowk way back in 1885 as a hospital for women and children. It was the dream of the Delhi Female Medical Mission to operate in a hospital. The St. Stephen's Hospital for Women and Children was founded in memory of Priscilla Winter, founder of Delhi Female Medical Mission In the late 1890s, the Mission's treated around 600-700 patients in the new hospital, 15,000 at the dispensaries, and 1,200 through home visits

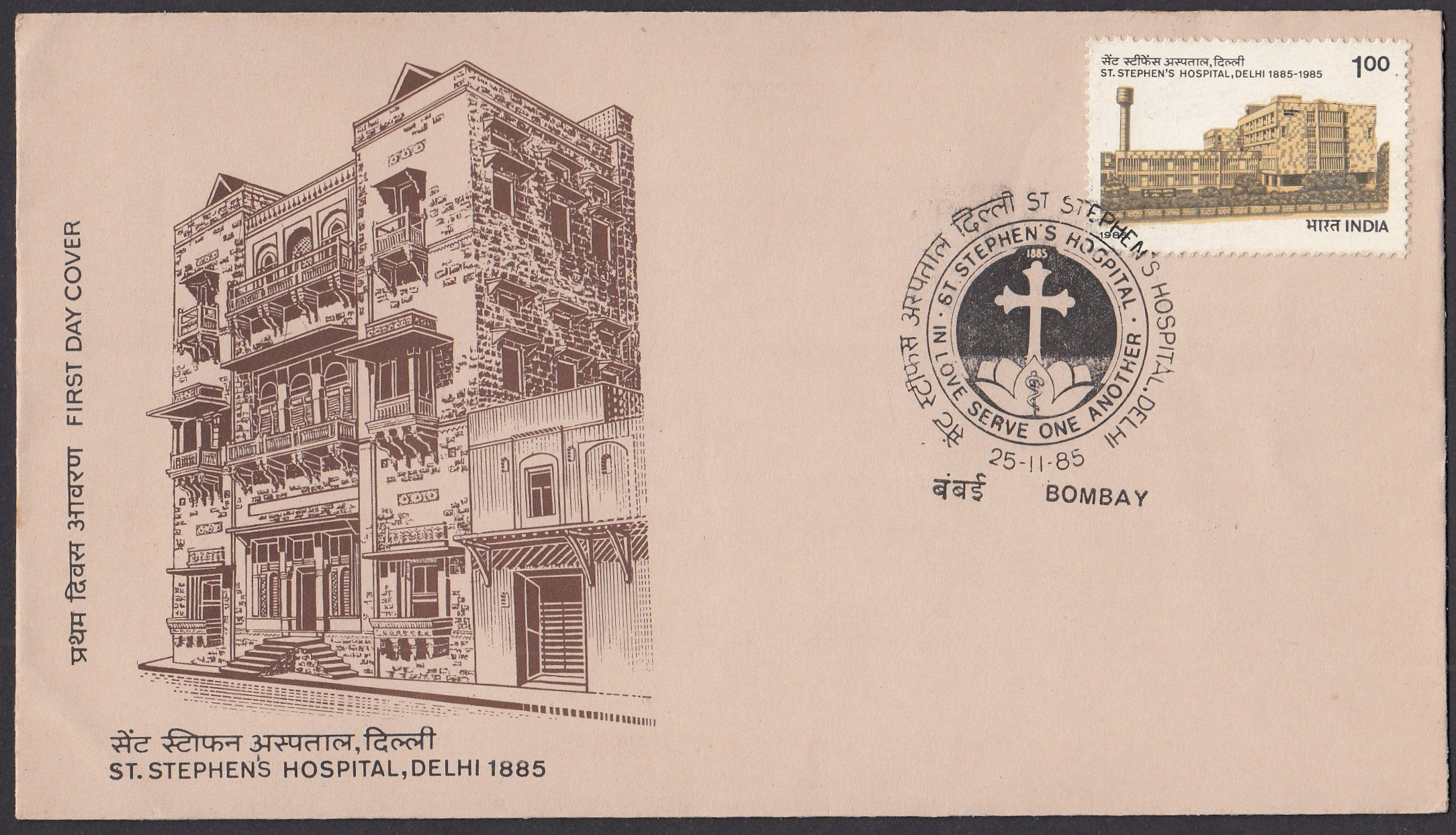
Commemorative centenary first day cover released in 1985

The hospital was centrally located in Old Delhi and was the first hospital solely dedicated to the care of women and children in Delhi. The hospital was known for its thorough hygiene and discipline. Although the hospital initially first lacked both resources and staff, it began to take off in 1891.

The hospital hired their first female doctor, Jenny Muller, a woman of Indian-German origins who had attended the London School of Medicine for Women. In 1893, a second female doctor, Mildred Staley joined.

The hospital building was opened by Lady Dufferin, Vicereine of India. The foundation stone for the old hospital building at Tis Hazari was laid in 1906 and the hospital was opened in 1909.

The maternity block at Tis Hazari campus was opened in 1969 by Indira Gandhi the Prime Minister of India. The foundation stone for the General Hospital was laid in 1972 by V. V. Giri the President of India and opened by Indira Gandhi in 1976. The mother and child block was later named after Dr Lucy Oommen, the first Indian medical director of the institute and a Padma Shri awardee by Dr.A. P. J. Abdul Kalam, the President of India.

A commemorative stamp was issued by the postal department in 1985 with the picture of the central hospital building and the first day cover depicting the first hospital building at Chandni Chowk.

== Education ==
St. Stephen's Hospital was the first one to begin training the Indian women as nurses in 1867. The training School for nurses was started under Alice Wilkinson—the first trained British nurse who joined the hospital in 1908. Wilkinson became the hospital's nursing superintendent. She also founded the Trained Nurse's Association of India and worked as its secretary until 1948. The first school of nursing in India was started much later in 1871 at Government General Hospital, Chennai.

The hospital is also one of the major teaching hospitals offering speciality and superspeciality courses affiliated to the National Board of Examinations and recognized by the Medical Council of India. The hospital also won the national award from the National Board of Examinations for the excellence in teaching in the Diplomate of National Board programme

The hospital also trains laboratory technicians to perform standardized Hemophilia tests under the aegis of Hemophilia Federation of India

== Research ==
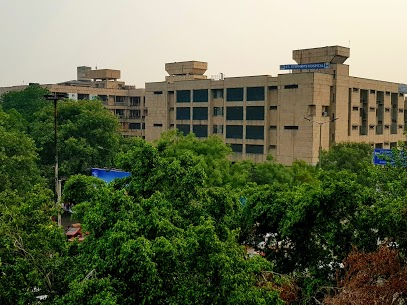
St Stephen's Hospital, New Delhi

The hospital has a rich tradition contributing to research and knowledge advancing healthcare. Records of publications from the institute date back to 1894 on surgical procedures to much recent on red cell abnormalities. The hospital also contributed to the World Health Organization Trauma Care Checklist Program Care Process Measures. An active research group works in the area of gestational diabetes and Rheumatology.

The organisation is recognized by Department of Scientific and Industrial Research, Government of India.

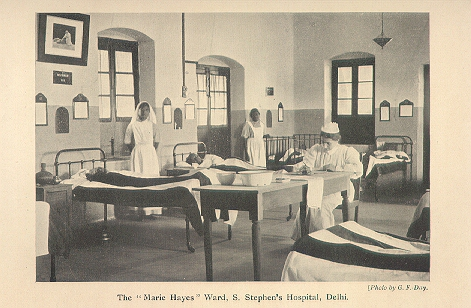
St Stephen's Hospital

== Specialties ==
The hospital provides patients with the following services:

- Anesthesia
- Cardio-Thoracic and Vascular Surgery
- Cardiology
- Casualty
- Community Health
- Dental & Faciomaxillary Surgery
- Dermatology
- E.N.T
- Endocrinology
- Gastroenterology
- Histo Pathology
- Laboratory Services
- Medicine
- Nephrology
- Neurology
- Neurosurgery
- Obstetrics and Gynaecology
- Ophthalmology
- Orthopaedics
- Paediatrics
- Paediatrics surgery
- Plastic surgery
- Psychiatry
- Radiology
- Reproductive and retal medicine (RFM)
- Respiratory pulmonary medicine
- Rheumatology
- Surgery
- Urology

== Notable personalities ==
The hospital has contributed a number of notable personalities in modern-day India, including:

- Dr. Marie Elizabeth Hayes, Medical Professional
- Dr. Lucy Oommen, Padma Shri awardee.
- Dr Balu Sankaran professor, scientist and recipient of the Padma Shri and Padma Vibushan awards.
- Dr. Mathew Varghese, who runs India's only polio ward

== Community Health Centre ==
The Community Health Centre, established in 1981 and inaugurated by Jagmohan, the then Lt Governor of Delhi and situated in Nand Nagri serve people with preventive, pro motive, curative & rehabilitative care

== Last polio ward in India ==
The hospital also runs the distinction of running the last polio ward in the country. While, India eradicated polio in 2011, millions live with the scars left over by the disease. The ward run by Dr Mathew Varghese, a renowned orthopedic surgeon who provides care, treatment and rehabilitation to individuals debilitated by polio
