= Indefinite =

Indefinite may refer to:

- the opposite of definite in grammar
  - indefinite article
  - indefinite pronoun
- Indefinite integral, another name for the antiderivative
- Indefinite forms in algebra: see definite quadratic forms
- an indefinite matrix
- the "indefinite" or apeiron in ancient Greek philosophy

== See also ==
- Eternity
- NaN
- Undefined (disambiguation)
