= Oommen =

Oommen (Malayalam: ഉമ്മന്‍) is a name used by Syrian Christians (Nasranis) of India, especially in Kerala, the Southwestern state of India.

The name Oommen is a local variant of the Syriac name 'Thoma' (Syriac: ܬܐܽܡܳܐ).

According to Syrian Christian history, Mar Thoma (St. Thomas), the Apostle of Christ established the Christian Church in India. The Eastern Church followed Syriac liturgical traditions and uses both Indian and Syriac names.

== Notable persons ==
- Oommen Chandy (born 1943), Indian politician
- Oommen Mathew (1939–2013), Indian politician
