= Neelamperoor Palli Bhagavathi Temple =

Hindu temple in Kerala, India

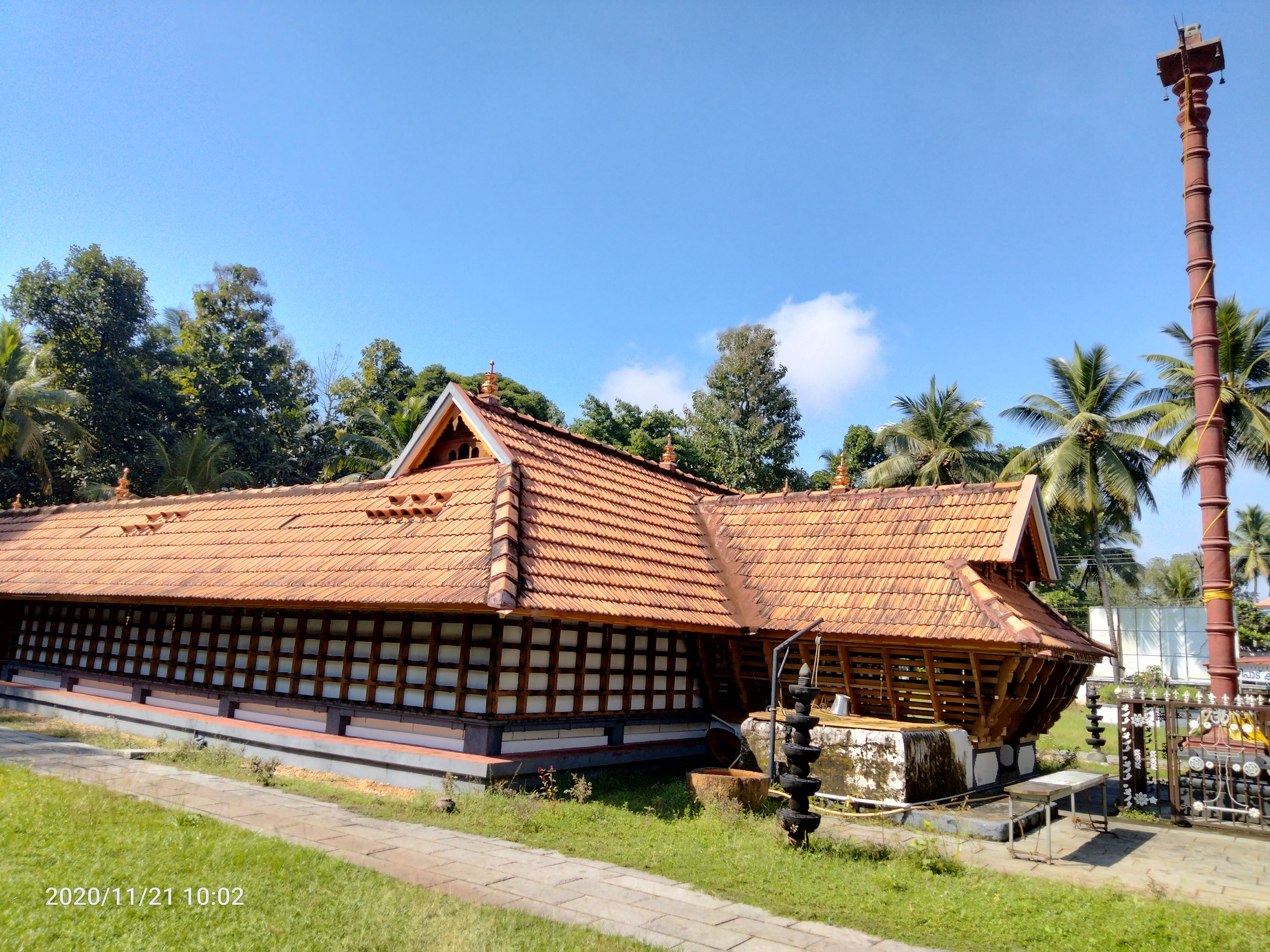

- Palli Bhagavathi Temple, Neelamperoor

Religion
- Affiliation: Hinduism
- District: Alappuzha
- Deity: Vanadurga Devi / Kali
- Festival: Padayani festival

Location
- Location: Neelamperoor
- State: Kerala
- Country: India
- Interactive map of Neelamperoor Palli Bhagavathi Temple
- Coordinates: 9°29′47.5″N 76°30′20.3″E

Architecture
- Type: Architecture of Kerala

Specifications
- Temple: One
- Elevation: 27.75 m (91 ft)

Neelamperoor Palli Bhagavathi Temple is a Hindu temple dedicated to Bhagavathy, situated at Neelamperoor in Alappuzha district of Kerala, India. The temple is known for padayani festival. The principal deity is Vanadurga (Durga or Kali).

== Image Gallery ==
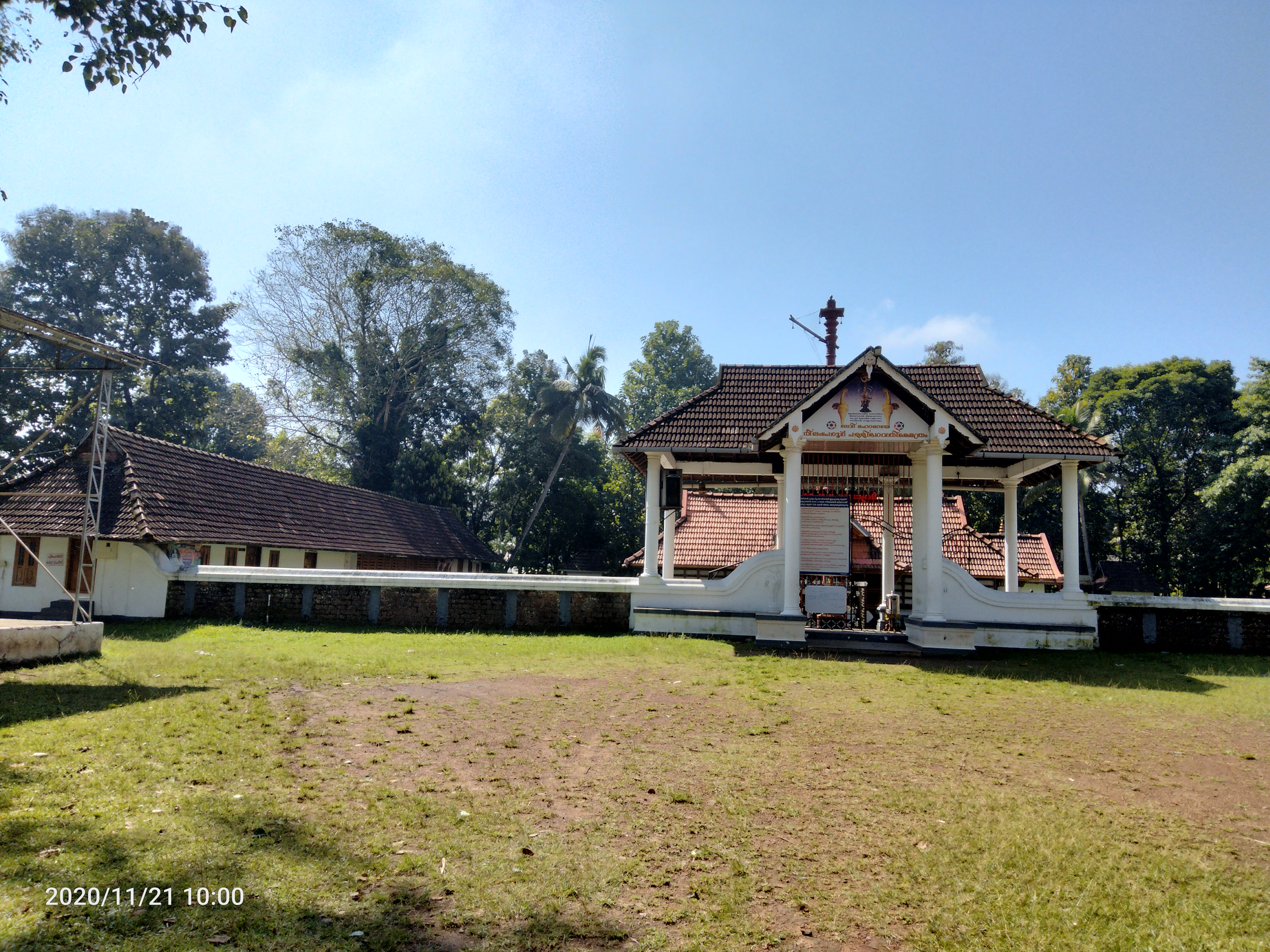
Neelamperoor Pally Bhagavathi Temple Front view

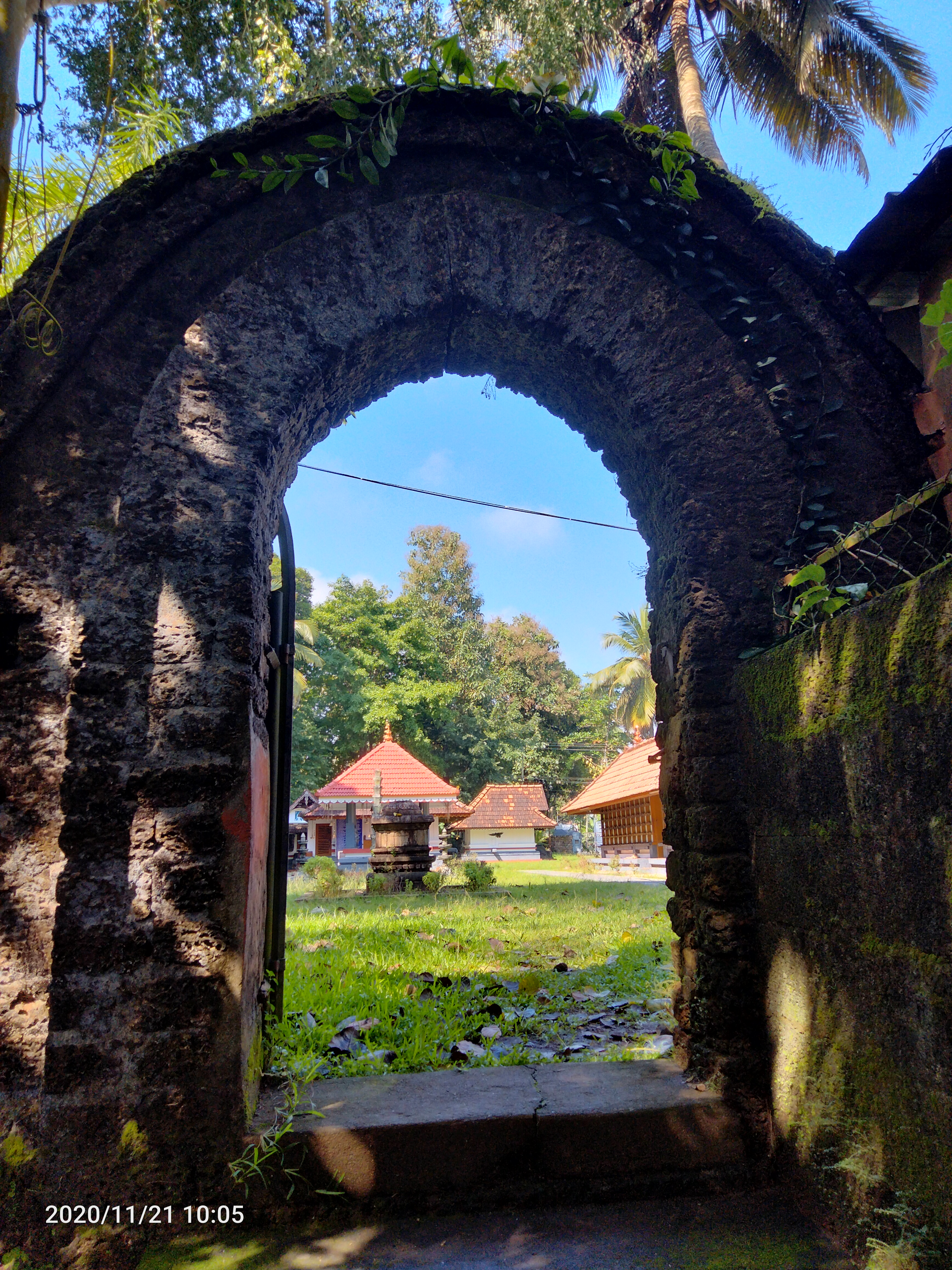
Neelamperoor Pally Bhagavathi Temple_arch door at the south side

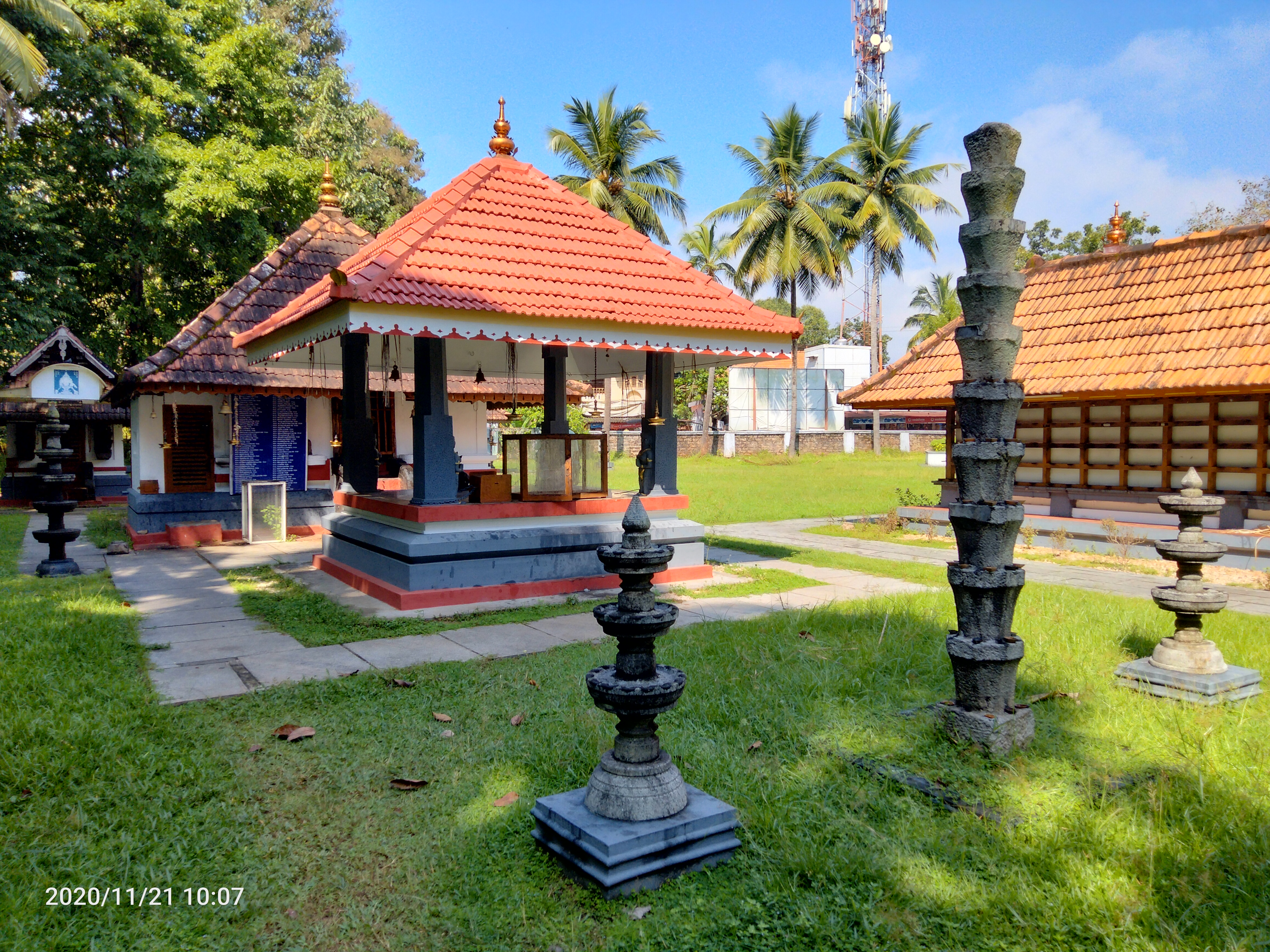
Neelamperoor Pally Bhagavathi Temple_ siva palliyara

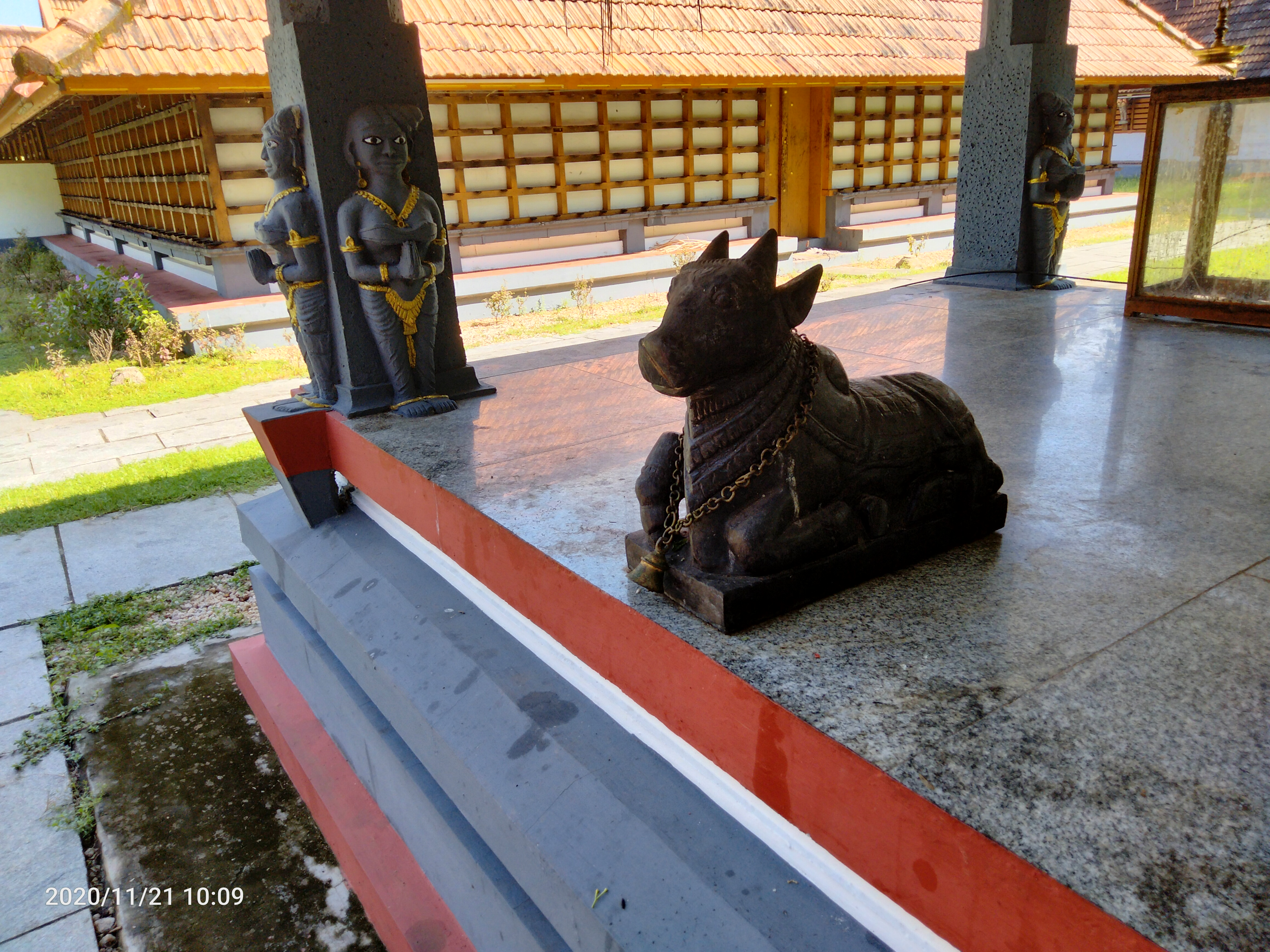
Neelamperoor Pally Bhagavathi Temple_ Nandi

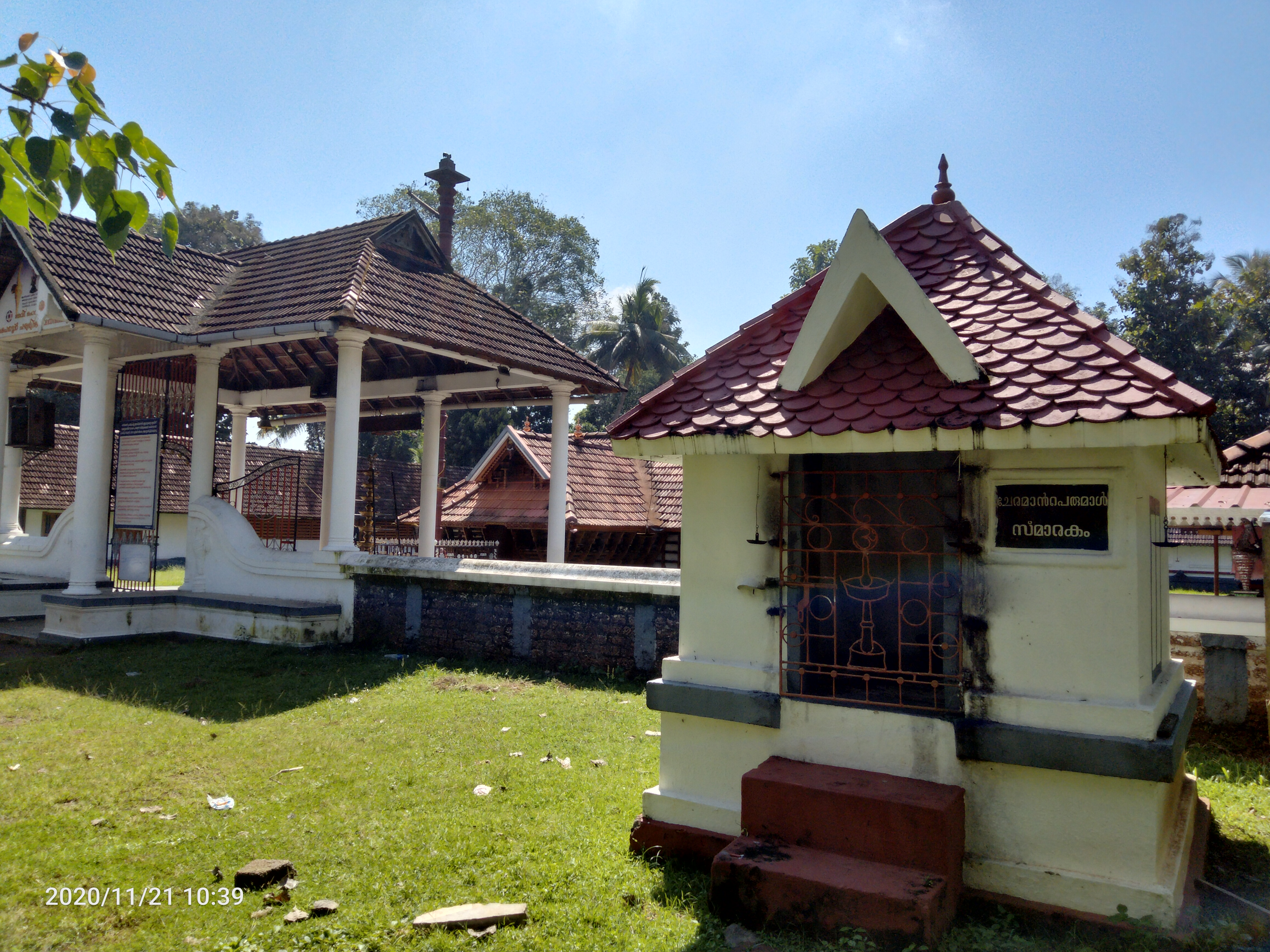
Neelamperoor Pally Bhagavathi Temple-Cheraman Perumal memorial
