= K. C. Joseph (Kuttanadu politician) =

Indian politician (born 1949)

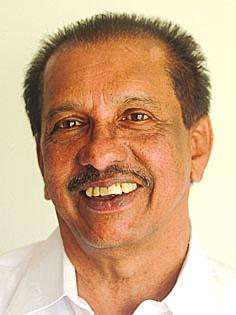

Dr. Kaithapparampil Chacko Joseph (born 16 July 1949) is an Indian politician and former Member of the Kerala Legislative Assembly. He is the chair of Janadhipathya Kerala Congress.

Joseph is the son of K. J. Chacko and Mariamma, and was born at North Veliyanad, Kuttanad, Kerala on 16 July 1949 and completed his MBBS from the Government Medical College, Kozhikode in 1975.

He began his legislative career in 1977 from Perambra constituency in Kozhikode district and later from Kuttanad constituency in 1982, which he held for 24 years until 2006. In 1982, he was the first to be appointed the Government Chief Whip in the history of Kerala Legislative Assembly, where he served until 1987.

Joseph also has held the positions of Deputy Leader, Kerala Congress Legislature Party Leader, Kerala Congress Legislature Party Syndicate Member, Cochin University and General Secretary, Kerala Congress (1979 –91).
