= Balu Sankaran =

Indian academic (1926–2012)

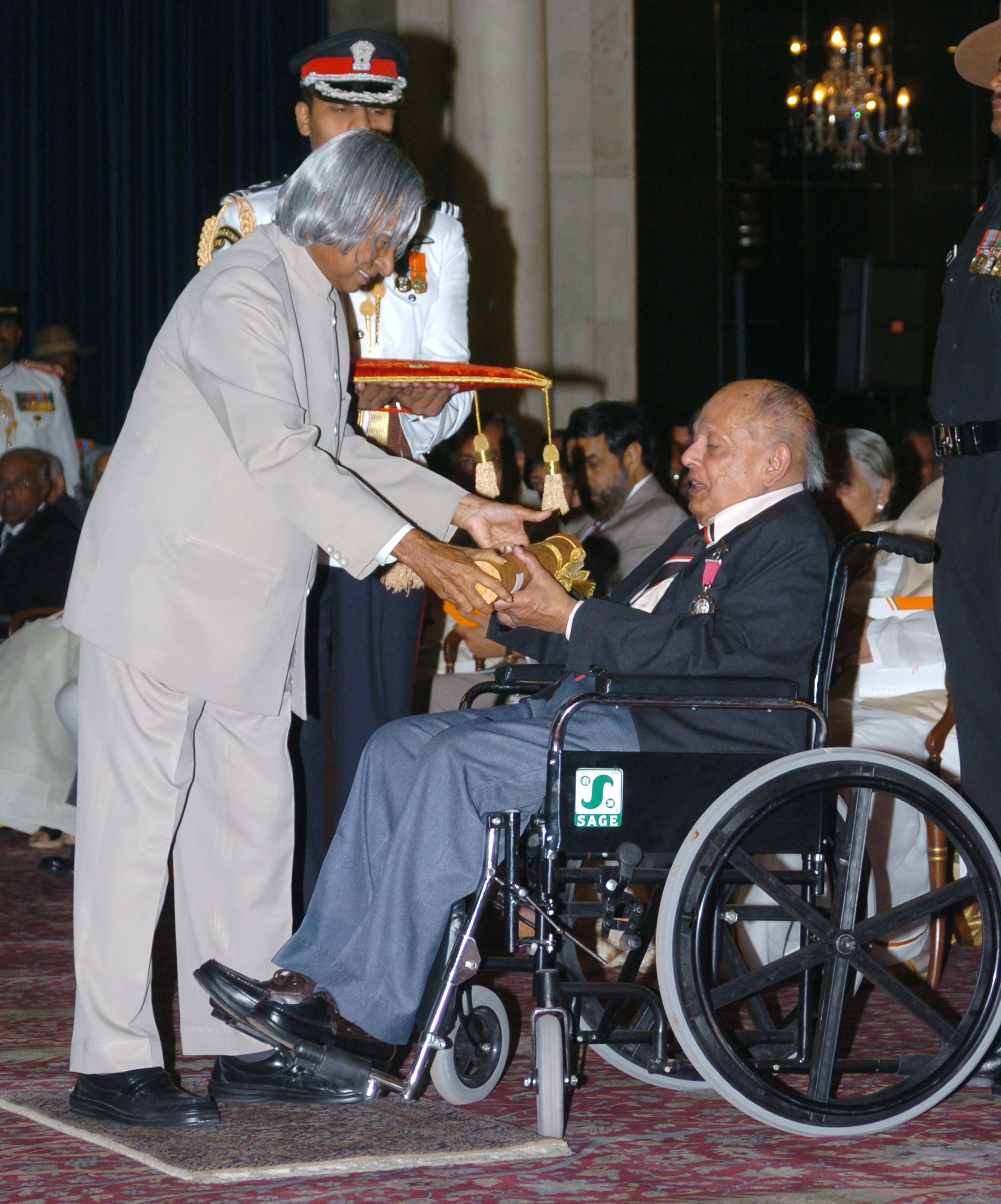
- Born: 4 September 1926; Tamil Nadu
- Died: 20 June 2012 (aged 85)
- Occupation: Professor Emeritus of St Stephen's Hospital, Delhi
- Spouse: Sukanya

Balu Sankaran was a professor, scientist and recipient of the Padma Shri and Padma Vibushan awards. He helped establish an artificial limbs manufacturing corporation and a rehabilitation institute.

== Biography ==
Sankaran was born in Tamil Nadu on 4 September 1926. He graduated with a medical degree from Stanley Medical College in Chennai in 1948. He travelled to United States and England and received training from Columbia Presbyterian Medical Center during 1951–1955 and Manchester Royal Infirmary in 1955.

== Career ==
After he returned to India from Manchester, UK, Sankaran taught for a few months in the Department of Anatomy at KMC Manipal before joining AIIMS Delhi. Sankaran began his career as an assistant professor of orthopedic surgery in All India Institute of Medical Sciences (AIIMS) in 1956. After seven years as an assistant professor, he was promoted to associate professor in 1963 and continued with AIIMS till 1967. While working in AIIMS, he conducted basic medical research as a Rockefeller Foundation fellow at University of Chicago in the United States. After his stint at AIIMS, he accepted a position as professor in Maulana Azad Medical College till 1970. He served as a director of Central Institute of Orthopedics during 1970 till 1978. He was offered to serve as the director of World Health Organization in Geneva in 1981 and remained with WHO till 1987. He also served as the chairman of the Rehabilitation Council of India between 1992 and 1994.

While working as a director of Central Institute of Orthopedics, He helped set up the Artificial Limbs Manufacturing Corporation of India at Kanpur in 1972 and helped establish National Institute of Rehabilitation Training and Research at Olatpur near Bhubaneshwar in 1975 and remained chairman of the corporation till 1981. He worked as a professor emeritus at St Stephen's Hospital, Delhi.

== Death ==
He died on 20 June 2012 after a brief illness.

== Awards ==
He received the Padma Shri award in 1972 for the trauma care and rehabilitation provided to soldiers injured in 1971 Bangladesh war, while stationed at Safdarjung Hospital. He also received the Padma Vibushan award for medicine in year 2007.
