= Subash Vasu =

Indian politician

Subhash Vasu
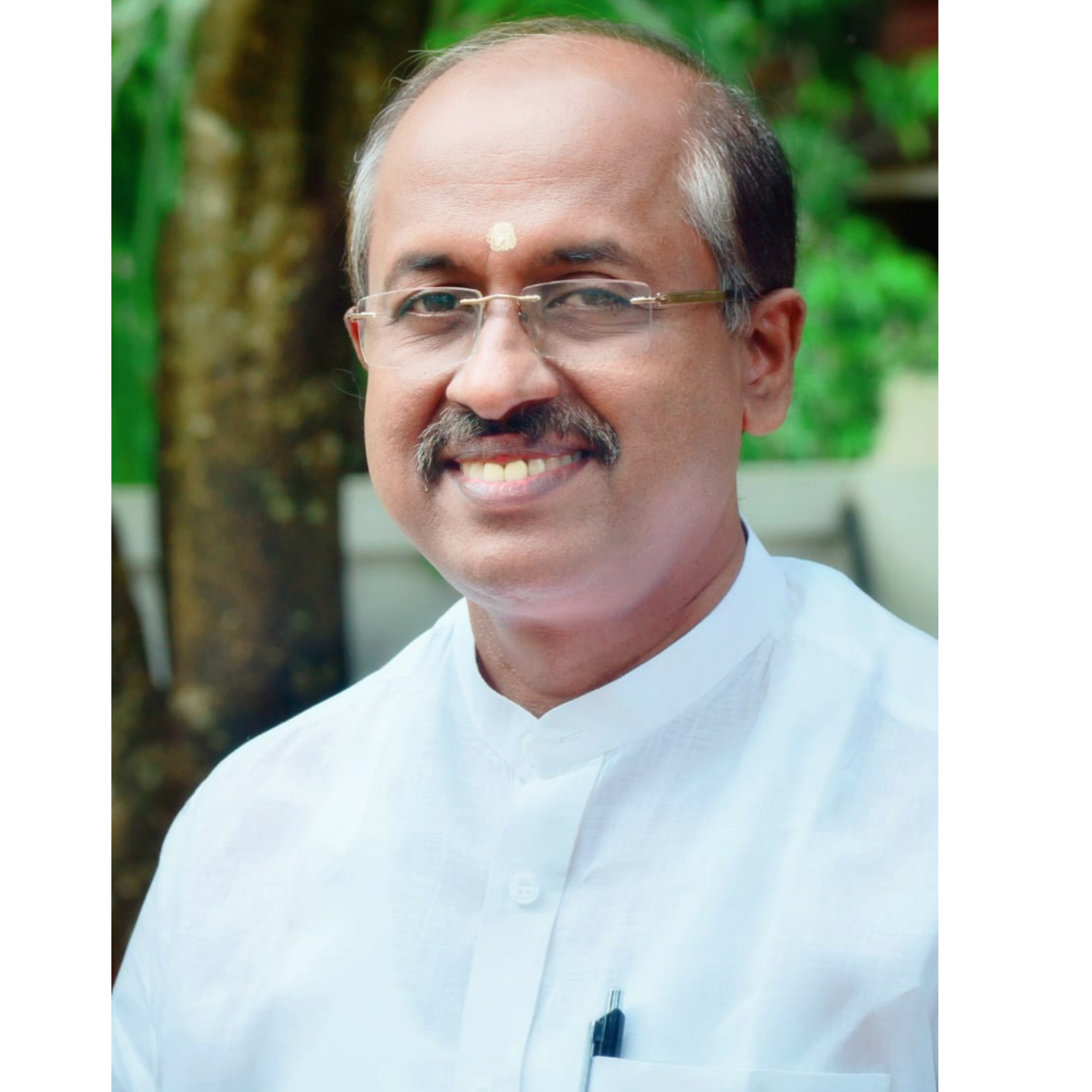

Former Chairman Spices Board of India

Former Travancore Devaswom Board Member

Personal details
- Born: Kattachira, Kayamkulam, Kerala, India
- Party: BDJS
- Occupation: Politician
- Website: www.bdjs.org

Subhash Vasu is the ex-chairman of the Spices Board of India (Ministry of Commerce and Industry, Government of India). He is the national president of the BDJS party and SNDP Mavelikara union president. He was also the former Travancore Devaswom Board member until 2015. He was the NDA candidate from Kuttanad, Kerala during 2016 Kerala Legislative Assembly election.
