= Women's missionary societies =

Following is a list of women's missionary societies, organized by country, with formation years.

== Canada ==
- Canada Congregational Woman's Board of Missions - 1886
- United Baptist Woman's Missionary Union of the Maritime Provinces - 1906
- Woman's Baptist Foreign Missionary Society of Ontario (West) - 1876
- Woman's Baptist Foreign Missionary Society of Eastern Ontario and Quebec - 1876
- Woman's Missionary Society of the Methodist Church, Canada - after 1834
- Woman's Missionary Society of the Presbyterian Church in Canada
- Woman's Missionary Society of the Presbyterian Church in Canada (Eastern Section) - 1876
- Woman's Missionary Society of the Presbyterian Church in Canada (Western Division) - 1877

== India ==
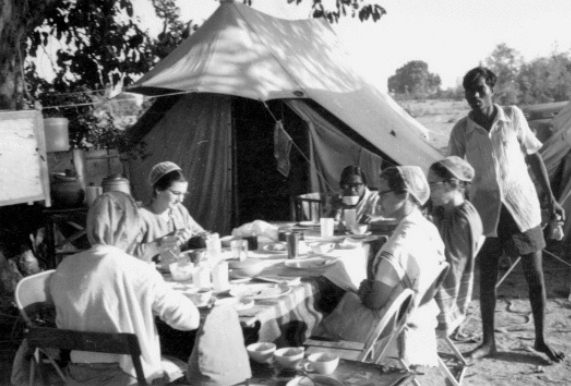
The missionary sister and others eating at the Women's Retreat (Mennonite mission)

- Delhi Female Medical Mission - 1866

== United Kingdom ==
- Church of England Zenana Missionary Society - 1880
- Society for Promotion of Female Education in the East - 1853
- Wesleyan Ladies' Auxiliary for Female Education in Foreign Countries - 1832

== United States ==
A missionary society formed in 1799 to assist in increasing an interest in its work in foreign countries, and in raising missionary efforts for the same, a woman's missionary society was organized in 1801. With the same object, "Cent Societies” among women, were active until 1815, when Maternal Associations were established throughout the churches and flourished until about 1842. The missionary society of 1799 emerged into the American Board of Commissioners for Foreign Missions, early in whose history it began its efforts to reach foreign women through the labors of single women.

All Christian denominations had strong convictions of duty towards countries where Christianity was not prevalent. When it was felt that female teachers were a necessity, self-sacrificing, earnest Christian women responded to the appeals for teachers. As early as 1800, the women of the U.S. were interested in "home missions". In 1803, the first Woman's Home Missionary Society was formed at the First Church, Providence, Rhode Island, with the name of "FEMALE MITE SOCIETY" of First Baptist Church. Its object, "To aid in sending the gospel to the wilds of western New York and Pennsylvania". Other societies of like character followed, and for a number of years, were independent of any general organization.

Coincidentally or providentially, the necessities of the American Civil War called forth their sympathy, fortitude and endurance. They became conscious of their power to relieve distress and to comfort the sick. Thus there was developed an ability to cooperate successfully and to work collectively. When peace was restored, women were prepared to engage both at home and abroad. They also felt that they could work more effectually in connection with their several denominational boards of missions.Some notable women's missionary societies included:

- American Zenana Mission - 1864
- Christian Woman's Board of Missions - 1874
- Council of Women for Home Missions - 1908
- Female Missionary Society - c. 1818
- Free Baptist Woman's Missionary Society - 1873
- Ladies' Medical Missionary Society of Philadelphia - 1851
- Woman's American Baptist Foreign Missionary Society - 1871
- Woman's American Baptist Home Mission Society - 1877
- Woman's Board for Foreign Missions of the Christian Church - 1886
- Woman's Board of Foreign Missions of the Cumberland Presbyterian Church
- Woman's Board of Foreign Missions of the Presbyterian Church - 1870
- Woman's Boards of the Congregational Church

- Woman's Board of Foreign Missions - 1868
- Woman's Board of Missions of the Interior - 1868
- Woman's Board of Missions for the Pacific - 1873
- Woman's Board of the Pacific Islands, 1871

- Woman's Foreign Missionary Society of the Free Methodist Church of North America - 1882
- Woman's Foreign Missionary Society of the Methodist Episcopal Church - 1869
- Woman's Foreign Missionary Society of the Methodist Protestant Church - 1879
- Woman's Foreign Missionary Society of the Reformed Episcopal Church - 1889
- Woman's Foreign Missionary Union of Friends in America - 1887
- Woman's General Missionary Society of the Churches of God - 1903
- Woman's Home and Foreign Missionary Society of the General Synod of the Evangelical Lutheran Church in the USA
- Woman's Home and Foreign Missionary Society of the United Evangelical Church - 1891
- Woman's Home and Foreign Mission Society of the Advent Christian Denomination - 1897
- Woman's Missionary Society of the UCC
- Woman's Missionary Union - 1888
- Woman's Union Missionary Society of America for Heathen Lands - 1861
- Women's Missionary Association of the Church of the UB
- Women's Missionary Association of the Presbyterian Church of England
- Woman's Missionary Society of the Evangelical Association - 1880
- Woman's Missionary Society of the Methodist Episcopal Church (South)
- Women's Missionary Society of the United Lutheran Church in America
- Women Teachers' Missionary Association
