= Lucy Oommen =

Indian gynaecologist

- Born: Kerala, India
- Died: March 2002
- Occupation: Gynecologist
- Years active: 1942-1988
- Known for: Medical administration
- Parent(s): P. K. Oommen; Kochannamma
- Awards: Padma Shri

Lucy Oommen was an Indian gynaecologist and the first medical director of Indian origin at the St Stephen's Hospital, Delhi. Born to P. K. Oommen and Kochannamma and sister to Jacob Oommen and Alice, in the south Indian state of Kerala, she graduated in medicine from the Christian Medical College and Hospital, Vellore and joined St Stephen's Hospital Delhi as a surgeon in 1942. She then took charge as superintendent from Dr. Morris.

== Achievements ==
She became the first Indian to hold the position of director at the institution, and held the post till her retirement in 1988. She was awarded the fourth highest Indian civilian award of Padma Shri by the Government of India in 1977. St. Stephen's Hospital instituted an award, Dr. Lucy Oommen Award, in 2005, for recognizing excellence in Mother and Child Care, the first of the awards going to Sharda Jain, a known gynecologist based in New Delhi in 2008. She was awarded for her work in Obstetrics and Gynaecology including the social work that she had initiated. Dr. Lucy had been a gold medalist of the year during her college. After her death, St. Stephen's Hospital added her name to a wing of the hospital, now called the Dr. Lucy Oommen, Mother and Child Block.

== Contributions ==
St. Stephen's Hospital realized a growth from a maternity hospital comprising 140 beds to a general one comprising 450 beds, after the work done by Dr. Lucy. She also formed an institution called Patient's Welfare Society, which is a group that supports patients for free. She was also the personal physician for the Indian Prime Minister Indira Gandhi.

Oommen never married.

== See also ==
- St. Stephen's Church, Delhi
