= Delhi Female Medical Mission =

Delhi Female Medical Mission / St. Stephen's Hospital for Women and Children
- Founded: 1867; 159 years ago
- Founders: Priscilla Winter; Reverend Winter
- Purpose: Humanitarian, Religious
- Location: Brighton, England
- Region served: Delhi, India; Karnal, India
- Method: Aid
- Website: Modern Day Hospital: http://www.ststephenshospital.org

The Delhi Female Medical Mission (DFMM) was a medical mission in Delhi, India that was founded in the mid-19th century by an Indian-born Englishwoman named Priscilla Winter. The organization started as a dispensary along the Yamuna River in Delhi, but over time developed into a mission, which was then established as St. Stephen's Hospital for Women and Children, a hospital that remains in operation today.

== Priscilla Winter and the foundations of Delhi Female Medical Mission ==
Priscilla Winter (née Sandys) was born in Calcutta, India to two Anglican missionaries. Winter spent the majority of her childhood in England, but returned to Calcutta in 1858 at the age of sixteen to work for the Union Society for the Propagation of Gospel (USPG). She was sent to Calcutta to spread the word of the Gospel amongst the Indian women. This work was known as zenana work, where the missionaries went to the home of native women in order to convert them to Christianity. While working on Zenana missions, Winter wrote that, "Women in India get no relief from suffering... [because] the medicine man takes them in hand and his remedies are the crudest." Winter attempted to mediate the medical issues in Calcutta by "distributing simple remedies to all classes of Hindu women," who she described as "confine[d] to the purdah." While in Calcutta, Winter realized that the local women's only time out of the purdah was when they went to the river to pray, a concept that she would later use to advance her distribution of medicine to females. In 1863, Winter married Reverend Robert Winter, the head of the USPG operation in Delhi, and moved to Delhi with him. In Delhi, Winter began medical work on the Yamuna river with a "box" of medical samples. Winter was not a trained doctor or nurse but rather described herself as a person responding to the needs of women in the area. In 1864, cholera epidemics broke out in Delhi. During this time, Winter was able to observe the dramatic effect that illness had on the population of Delhi, specifically the toll it took on women.

== Foundation of the "White Ladies Association" and the beginning of the DFMM at Chandi Chowk ==
=== Winter's return to England ===
In 1865, Priscilla Winter returned to England on furlough from the Mission, with the intention of figuring out a way to fund a medical dispensary dedicated to work on women. Winter worried that a project like this one could possibly be too controversial for the USPG to fund. Instead, she decided to found a new society to provide funds for what was to become the Delhi Female Medical Mission. This foundation was called the White Ladies Association (WLA), and it made its founding statement in Brighton, England in October 1866. The association aimed to "attend native ladies in their zenanas," "set on foot a dispensary for women only," and "train native women as nurses" with female medical workers. In addition, the association planned to "make an example of Christian life and philanthropy" to the local women, who were confined to prejudices about Christianity according to the members of the WLA. The mission statement was both medical and religious—the DFMM was to be "a medical mission among the native women on Delhi, with the double objective of alleviating much physical suffering, and of taking a knowledge of Christianity to them in their secluded homes." The Delhi Female Medical Mission was actually founded in 1867, when Winter returned to India. Between the years of 1867 and 1874, the Mission was just an open-air dispensary on the banks of the Yamuna River. The dispensary was located in Chandni Chowk, a market region in old Delhi. A "temporary hospital" with bed for ten women was later opened up alongside the dispensary. While the majority of the funding for the DFMM came from the White Ladies Association, capital also came from the USPG, Punjab government, and Delhi Municipality. The Punjab government gave the DFMM 410 rupees per year to fund medicinal purchases, and the Delhi Municipality gave 75 rupees a month to subsidize a scholarship to train local women nurses. The Mission also hired English women, and their first employee, Mrs. Littler, was a trained midwife who worked from the Mission's opening until her death in 1873. Between December 1870 and October 1871, the Mission made 1,446 visits to 191 different patients in their zenanas. In addition, records indicate that approximately 305 patients had made 1,917 visits to the dispensary. The Mission was beginning to make way on its manifest, and in 1871 Reverend Winter recorded that the DFMM had begun to train local female nurses.

=== Establishment of DFMM ===
The DFMM was truly established between the years of 1875 and 1891 as it was taken over by a German woman known as Miss Englemann. Between October 1876 and 1877, the DFMM treated over 6,000 women and children at the dispensary plus another 1,000 in their homes. The Mission also enrolled eighteen local women in nursing classes. The Mission was only open on alternate days, but it averaged an attendance of thirty patients daily. In the early 1880s, the leaders of the DFMM decided they needed a concrete place to treat women—one that was not in their own homes. They found that Indian homes were the wrong environment for medical and spiritual healing. The homes in Delhi were prominently Hindi and were therefore not the best locations to spread the messages of Christianity. In addition, it was difficult to treat women in their homes, spread out in Delhi, as opposed to a hospital-like building where medicine and medical knowledge is concentrated. The new goal of the mission was to a build a hospital, yet one that was appropriately sized to both the means and realities of life in Delhi because as Reverend Winter noticed, the cultural norms dictated that many women would not come to a hospital.

In 1881 Priscilla Winter died. Yet, in the same year, the Mission hired an experienced nurse from Germany, Deaconess Jacoba Zeyen. Zeyen opened an outpost in Karnal, approximately seventy miles from Delhi, which cemented the establishment of the DFMM.

== St. Stephen's Hospital for Women and Children ==
The DFMM's dream to operate in a hospital was actualized in 1885 when St. Stephen's Hospital for Women and Children was founded in memory of Priscilla Winter. The hospital was centrally located and was the first hospital solely dedicated to the care of women and children in Delhi. The hospital was known for its thorough hygiene and discipline. It was designed to teach women new ideas about religion, which they could then in turn take back to their homes. Therefore, patients were incited to read scripture and gospel before treatment was administered. Although the hospital at first lacked both resources and staff, in 1891, it began to take off. The hospital hired their first female doctor, Jenny Muller, a woman of Indian-German origins who had attended the London School of Medicine for Women. In 1893, a second female doctor, Mildred Staley, was added to the practice. By 1865, the hospital housed three doctors and still operated the two dispensaries in Delhi and Karnal. Local women worked as nurses in the hospital under the supervision of an Englishwoman, Matron Mary Roberts. In the late 1890s. the Mission's yearly numbers were between 600-700 patients treated in the new hospital, 15,000 at the dispensaries, and 1,200 through home visits.

In 1906, the Mission laid the foundations for a bigger hospital located in Tiz Hazari, where it remains today. At the time, the director of the DFMM, GE Leroy, believed that a new hospital would establish the DFMM as a full-fledged medical practice. In 1908 the Mission actually moved into the new larger hospital building, which reflected a change in social customs as women were less hesitant to come to the hospital. At the same time, St. Stephen's still had to cater to the Indian, and dominantly Hindi culture. The hospital therefore hired Brahmin cooks and allowed relatives in rooms with patients. At the new hospital, Alice Wilkinson, founder of The Trained Nurses' Association of India, became the first trained British nurse to teach Indian women. In 1913, Helen Franklin, the first qualified surgeon to operate at the hospital, joined the practice.

Today, St. Stephen's hospital is still in operation. Its mission statement proclaims, "St. Stephen's Hospital is committed to serving all sections of society in the spirit of Christ, by providing quality, affordable healthcare as well as training healthcare professionals of excellence who would embody the Christian values of selfless service rendered with compassion and love."

== See also ==
- Women's missionary societies
