= Colonial Missionary Society =

Christian organization

The Colonial Missionary Society was a British Chrisian organization formed in May 1836 as a "distinct society for the Colonies" following the report of a deputation to Canada by representatives of Congregational churches from Britain. Its principal mission effort was directed towards promoting Congregationalist forms of Christianity among "British or other European settlers" rather than indigenous peoples.

At first it functioned as part of the Congregational Union, which Andrew Reed, an early honorary secretary, described as "a crippled and dependent existence". In time it became an independent body.

In 1901, in a printed souvenir of the Autumnal Meetings (14 to 18 October, 1901 in Manchester) of the Congregational Union of England, Wales, Scotland and Ireland, the object of the Society was stated as: "to promote Evangelical religion among British or other European Settlers and their descendants in the Colonies and Dependencies of Great Britain, and in other parts of the world, and among converts gathered into Christian Churches from heathenism, in accordance with the doctrine and the discipline of Congregational Churches". In accordance with this, Churches or Missions were being helped in: Cape Colony, Natal, The Transvaal, Rhodesia, Newfoundland, British Columbia, Manitoba, Jamaica, Western Australia, Tasmania, Queensland and New Zealand.

Radical changes in the way Great Britain related to its former colonies after World War II, coupled with the growth of the ecumenical movement led to four changes in the society's identity during the 1950s, '60s and '70s. It changed its name to the Commonwealth Missionary Society in 1956, then merged with the London Missionary Society in 1966 to form the Congregational Council for World Mission (CCWM). At the formation of the United Reformed Church in 1972 it underwent another name change, becoming the Council for World Mission (Congregational and Reformed). The CWM (Congregational and Reformed) was again restructured in 1977 to create a more internationalist and global body, the Council for World Mission (CWM).

The records of the Colonial Missionary Society are held at the library of the School of Oriental and African Studies in London.
