= Oommen Mathew =

Indian politician (1939–2013)

Oommen Mathew (22 December 1939 – 20 July 2013) was a politician from Kerala, India.

Mathew was the son of M. C. Oommen of the Mammoottil house in Thalavady. He was the working chairman of Kerala Congress (Jacob), a splinter faction of Kerala Congress. From 1980 to 1982, he was a member of the 6th Kerala Legislative Assembly (India) representing the Kuttanad Constituency. He was appointed the chairman of Kerala State Housing Board in 1982, and held that position until 1986. In 2001, he again contested from Kuttanad constituency but lost to K.C. Joseph of LDF. At the time of his death, he was the chairman of State Farming Corporation of Kerala.

Mathew married Annamma and has two sons and two daughters.

Mathew died at a private hospital in Kochi on 20 July 2013 of a heart attack, aged 73.

== Other positions held ==
- President, All India Housing Development Association
- President, Thalavady Panchayath
- Chairman, Champakulam BDC
- Member, KSRTC Advisory Committee, Kerala State Transport Authority, Food Advisory Committee, Kerala State Archives Council
- President, Kerala Karshaka Union
- General secretary, Kerala Congress
- General secretary, Democratic Indira Congress (Karunakaran)
