= Definable =

In mathematical logic, the word definable may refer to:

- A definable real number
- A definable set
- A definable integer sequence
- A relation or function definable over a first order structure
- A mathematical object or concept that is well-defined
