= Thomas K. Thomas =

Indian politician, member of the 15th Kerala Legislative Assembly

Kerala State President of Nationalist Congress Party (Sharadchandra Pawar)
- Incumbent
- Assumed office 28 February 2025
- Preceded by: P. C. Chacko

Member of Kerala Legislative Assembly
- In office 2021–2026
- Constituency: Kuttanad

Personal details
- Party: NCP
- Relatives: Thomas Chandy (brother)

Thomas K. Thomas is an Indian politician and member of the 15th Kerala Legislative Assembly. He represented Kuttanad constituency in Kerala Legislative Assembly as an NCP candidate.

== Controversies ==
A case was filed against him for allegedly making casteist slur against a party worker.
