= John Oommen =

Canadian-Indian computer scientis (1953)

Basantkumar John Oommen (born 8 September 1953 in Coonoor, India) is an Indian-Canadian computer scientist. Oommen received the Master of Science degree from the Indian Institute of Science, Bangalore in 1979, and the Doctor of Philosophy degree from Purdue University in 1982, and is now Chancellor's Professor at the School of Computer Science, Carleton University.

== Recognition and awards ==
- Fellow of the IAPR, August 2006
- Chancellor's Professorship, lifetime award bestowed by the University to professors who have excelled in research, July 2006
- Fellow of the IEEE, January 2003
- Electrical Engineering Gold Medal Winner 1977, Indian Institute of Science, Bangalore, for best graduating student
- Siemens-India Meda 1975, Indian Institute of Technology, Madras, for best graduating student from the Department of Electrical Engineering
- Kaloori Medal 1974, IIT Madras

== Patents ==
- US patent USOO6865567B1, Oommen, "Method of Generating Attribute Cardinality Maps", published 8 March 2005, issued 8 March 2005
- US patent US20030130977A1, Oommen, "Method for recognizing trees by processing potentially noisy subsequence trees", published 10 July 2003
- US patent US7508935B2, Oommen, "Cryptosystem for data security", published 11 November 2004, assigned to Stealthencloder and Inc
- CA patent CA2509496A1, "Search-enhanced trie-based syntactic pattern recognition of sequences", published 6 December 2006
