= Tees Hazari =

Tis Hazari
- Neighborhood of Delhi
- Location in North Delhi, India
- Coordinates: 28.6656°N 77.2168°E
- Country: India
- Territory: Delhi (National Capital Region)
- Region: North India
- Town: Delhi

Languages
  - Official: Hindi
- Time zone: UTC+5:30 (IST)
- PIN: 110054

Tis Hazari is a neighbourhood in North Delhi, India just south of the Northern Ridge.

It is the location of the Tis Hazari Courts Complex which was inaugurated on 19 March 1958 by Chief Justice Mr. A. N. Bhandari of the then Punjab High Court. It is one of the six District Courts that function under the Delhi High Court, and continues to be the principal Court building in state of Delhi.

== History ==
The place gets its name from a force of 30,000 Sikhs, which encamped here under Jassa Singh Ahluwalia, Jassa Singh Ramgarhia, and Baghel Singh in 1783, prior to Battle of Delhi (1783). Sikhs defeated Mughals in the Battle of Delhi (1783) and captured Red Fort. Under the command of Jassa Singh Ahluwalia and other leading warriors crossed the Yamuna and captured Saharanpur. They overran the territory of Najib ud-Daulah, the Ruhila chief, acquiring from him a tribute of eleven lakh of rupees (INR 1,100,000). In April Baghel Singh Dhaliwal with two other sardars (Rai Singh Bhangi and Tara Singh Ghaiba) crossed the Yamuna to occupy that country, which was then ruled by Zabita Khan, who was the son and successor of Najib ud-Daulah. Zabita Khan in desperation offered Baghel Singh Dhaliwal large sums of money and proposed an alliance to jointly plunder the crown lands. Sardar Baghel Singh Dhaliwal set up an octroi-post near Sabzi Mandi to collect the tax on the goods imported into the city to finance the search and the construction of the Sikh Temples. (He did not want to use the cash received from the Government Treasury for this purpose, and most of that was handed out to the needy and poor. He often distributed sweetmeats bought out of this government gift to the congregationalists at the place which is now known as the Pul Mithai.)

== Tis Hazari Court ==
The Tis Hazari Courts Complex was inaugurated in 1958 by Chief Justice A.N. Bhandari, the then Chief Justice of Punjab, since Delhi was under the jurisdiction of High Court of Punjab at the time. Tis Hazari was the principal court complex in Delhi, since Delhi consisted of only one district. However, courts were shifted out to other complexes with time. Presently, the court houses courts having their jurisdiction over Central Delhi, West Delhi.

=== History of West District Court ===
The West District Court of Delhi was established following directives from the Hon’ble Supreme Court of India. This division was formalized through the Government of the National Capital Territory (NCT) of Delhi's Notification No.F.6/10/2000-Judl/694-704 dated 28 June 2000, and further reinforced by Notification No.F.6/15/08-Suptlaw/1980-1982 dated 21 October 2008. As a result, the West District Court began its operations on 1 November 2008, located within the Tis Hazari Courts Complex in Delhi.

Initially, the West District Court handled both civil and criminal cases that were previously managed at the Tis Hazari Court Complex, Delhi-110 054. The Tis Hazari Courts Complex remains the operational hub for the West District, and its administration falls under the jurisdiction of the Principal District & Sessions Judge, HQ, Tis Hazari Courts, Delhi.

=== 2019 Clash of Lawyers & Police ===
On 2 November 2019, an altercation broke out between lawyers and police officers allegedly over parking. The lawyers alleged that the police misbehaved with them, while the police claimed that the lawyers turned violent without provocation. The incident spiralled into a police officer opening fire at lawyers, injuring two lawyers. The police claim that this was done to prevent lawyers from breaking into the lockup. Following this, spontaneous violence broke out throughout the Tis Hazari complex and several vehicles, including police vehicles, were set ablaze. A lady Deputy Commissioner of Police who happened to be present in the complex claimed to have her pistol snatched by lawyers.

The High Court of Delhi took cognizance of the violence, and conducted a special hearing on Sunday. The High Court ordered suspension of the police officers involved, and transfer of a Special Commissioner of Police and an Additional Deputy Commissioner of Police. The High Court also ordered a judicial probe headed by Justice (Retired) S.P. Garg.

The lawyers in all district courts of Delhi immediately went on strike and abstained from work. In the following days, incidents of lawyers harassing and manhandling police officers were reported. The strike was called off two weeks later.

=== Sexual Harassment ===
Several female lawyers have reported incidents of sexual harassment at Tis Hazari Courts, including groping and sexually coloured remarks.

== St Stephen's Hospital ==
St Stephen's Hospital, Delhi is the other landmark at Tis Hazari. It is a 600 bedded tertiary care and teaching hospital located adjacent to the court complex.

== Transport ==
The area is serviced by the Tis Hazari station on the Red Line of the Delhi Metro. Besides the Metro connections, Tis Hazari District Court is well connected through a series of "Destination" Bus services run by the Delhi Bar Association from Karkardooma Court, Patiala House Court, Delhi High Court and Supreme Court. One can otherwise avail other local buses with the major Bus terminal / destination namely ISBT and the nearby Mori Gate bus stop.
