= Neelamperoor =

- town
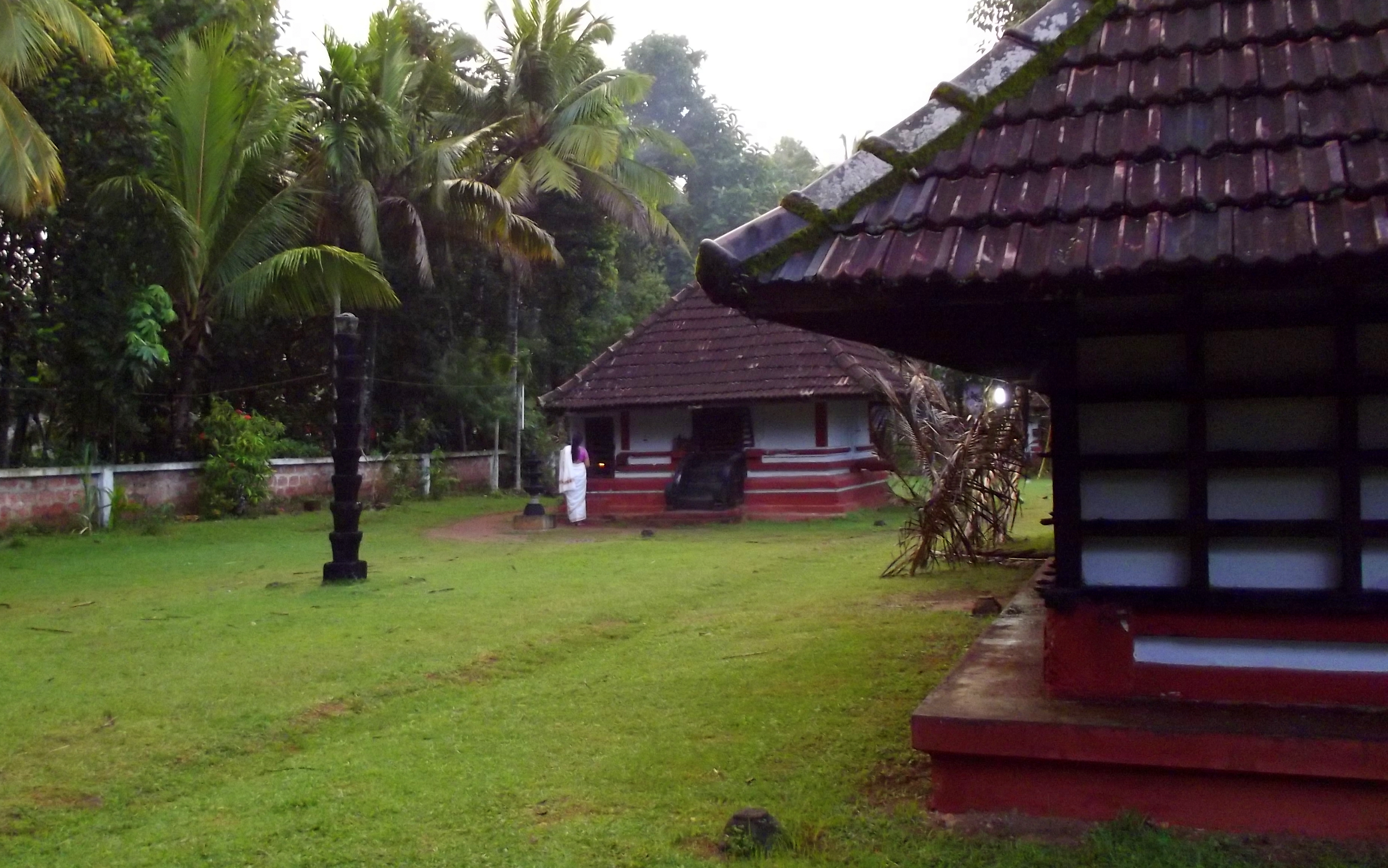
- Interactive map of Neelamperoor
- Coordinates: 9.495943°N 76.507598°E
- Country: India
- State: Kerala
- District: Alappuzha

Languages
  - Official: Malayalam, English
- Time zone: UTC+5:30 (IST)
- Postal code: 686534

Neelamperoor is a village in Kuttanad, Alappuzha district, Kerala. It is famous for its backwaters, lakes and paddy fields. People comprises both Hindu and Christian denominations.

The landmark for this place dwells with the Neelamperoor Palli Bhagavathi Temple, which is renowned for the famous festival "Pooram Padayani", held every year after onam festival that attracts huge crowds from different walks of life. Neelamperoor was connected with so many famous people like PN Paniker, neelamperoor madhusoodhanan nair, and so many kadhakali artist and others.

It is an important place for the Knanaya Christian community and a church named St. George Knanaya Church is built for its believers. The church was 175 years old. The church comprises almost 900 families.

Karunattuwala, a locality near Neelamperoor, acted as a main trade centre in the olden times. Karunattuvala is the connecting place to main land Kottayam in olden days land transport was up to Karunattuvala only after that people used to depend on back water transport only. In older days the place belongs to Changanacherry taluk and later annexed to Kuttanadu taluk due to the protest from farmers.

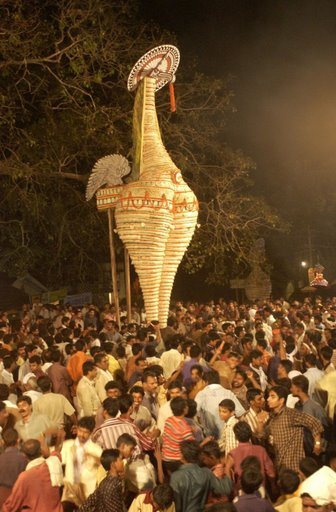
Neelamperoor Padayani conducting every year in Neelamperoor temple
