= Invalid =

Invalid may refer to:

== People ==
- Patient, a sick person
- An invalid, one confined to home or bed because of disability or injury

== Opposite of "valid" ==
- Validity (logic), in logic, true premises cannot lead to a false conclusion
- Validity (statistics), a measure which is measuring what it is supposed to measure

== Other uses ==
- .invalid, a top-level Internet domain not intended for real use
- Invalid (film), a 2023 Slovak black comedy movie

== See also ==
- Void (disambiguation)
