= Democratic Indira Congress (Karunakaran) =

- Abbreviation: DIC(K)
- Leader: K. Muraleedharan
- Founder: K. Karunakaran
- Founded: 2005
- Split from: Indian National Congress
- Merged into: Nationalist Congress Party
- Headquarters: Thrissur, Kerala
- Student wing: Kerala Students Union (Indira)
- Youth wing: Indira Youth Congress (Indira)
- Alliance: United Democratic Front (2006); Left Democratic Front (2005-2006)

Election symbol
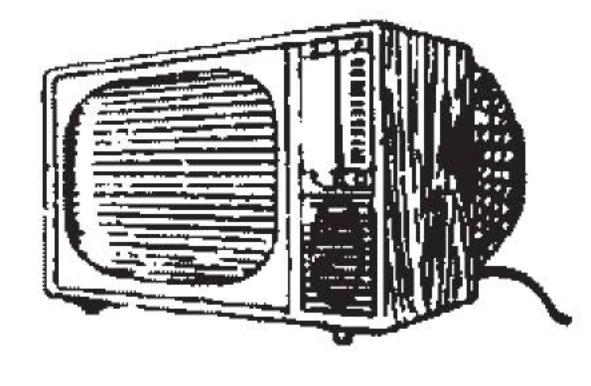
- Television

Party flag
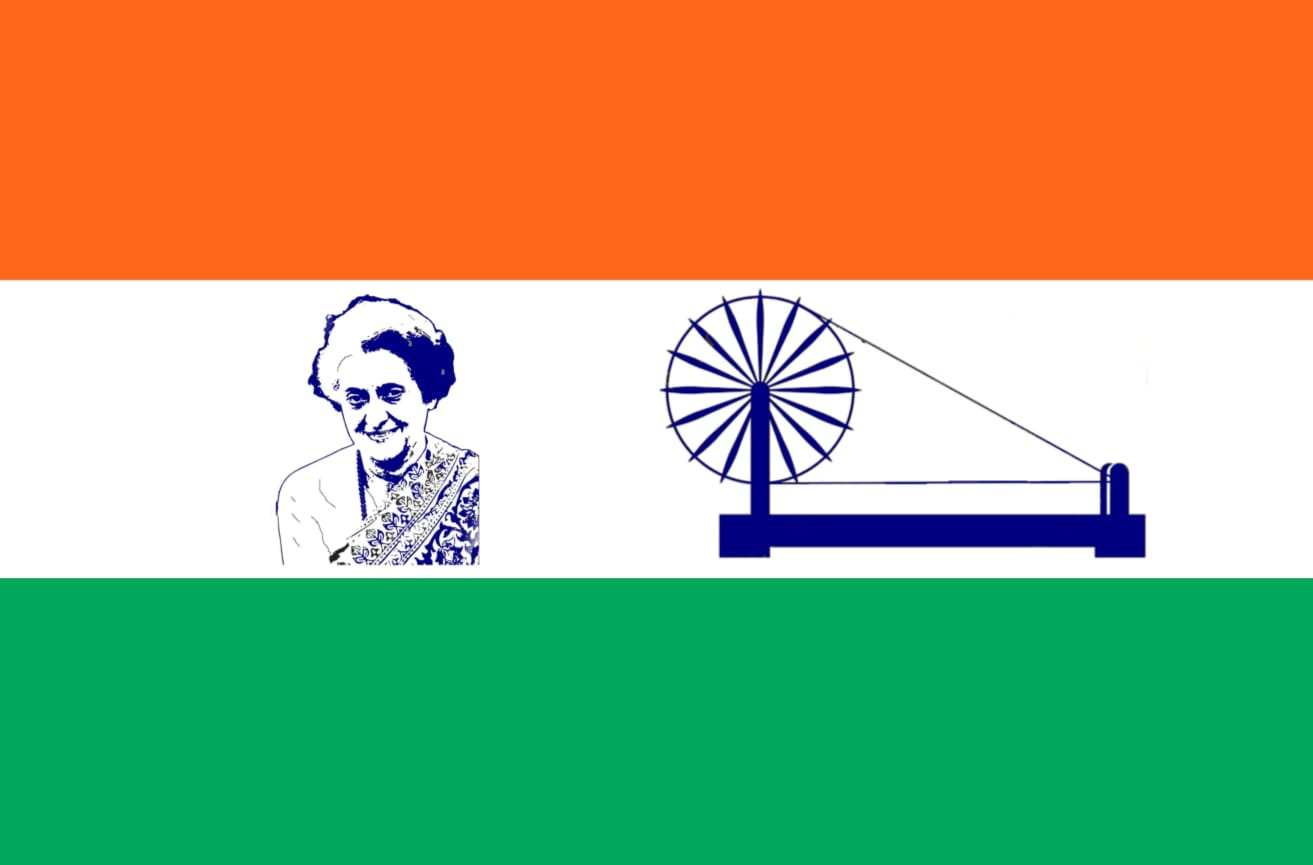

Democratic Indira Congress (Karunakaran) (DIC(K)) was a political party in Kerala, India. DIC(K) was founded at a meeting in Thrissur by the K. Karunakuran faction of the Indian National Congress on 1 May 2005. The party is now defunct. Initially, it was called the National Congress (Indira), but its name was changed to DIC(K) for the purpose of registration in August 2005.

The son of Karunakuran, K. Muraleedharan, was the first party president. Later, Karunakaran and Muraleedharan, along with some other party members, moved to the Nationalist Congress Party. After a brief while, Karunakaran and Muraleedharan returned to the Indian National Congress party.

== History ==
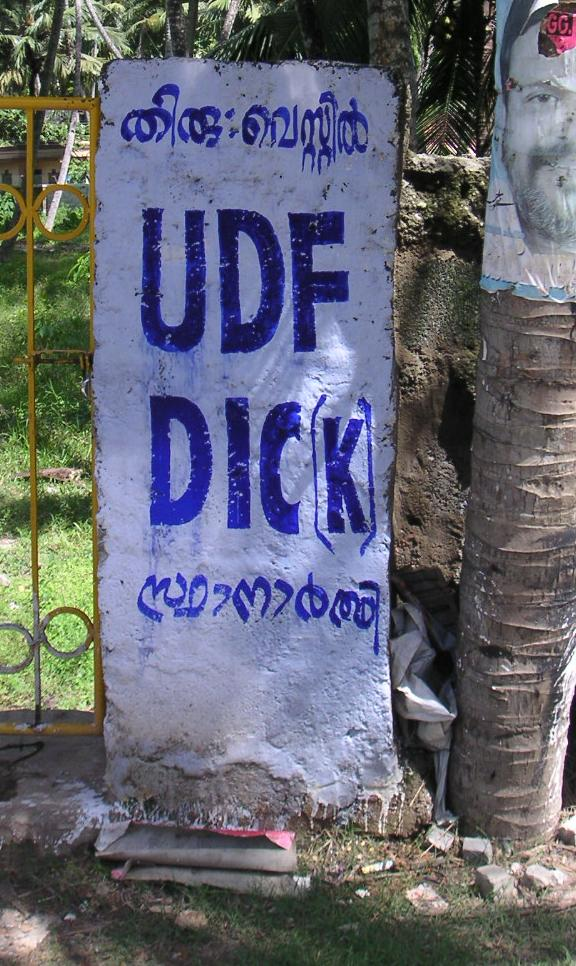
DIC(K) election campaign

The party was a breakaway faction of the erstwhile ruling party, the Congress. The split was a result of acrimony over by alleged slights to Karunakaran, including the disregarding of his lifelong services to the party. Karunakaran, Muraleedharan and T. M. Jacob were among the leaders of the party.

The DIC(K) also experienced internal dissent. Ahead of the 2005 panchayat elections, the DIC(K) allied with the erstwhile opposition coalition, the Left Democratic Front (Kerala) (LDF) and won. However, ahead of the 2006 Kerala legislative assembly elections, the DIC(K) entered into an understanding with the United Democratic Front (UDF) and the All India Anna Dravida Munnetra Kazhagam (AIADMK) to try to ensure K. Muraleedharan's victory in the assembly polls. That led to a group within the party forming a separate 'DIC(K) Left Forum', which wanted to align with the LDF. The Forum had plans of founding a new party after the elections. Later, the DIC(K) decided to merge into the Nationalist Congress Party (NCP) led by Sharad Pawar. This resulted in chaos within the DIC(K) and many of its leaders joined the Indian National Congress again.

== Party flag ==
The party's tricolour flag had the charkha (spinning wheel) and a portrait of Indira Gandhi as symbols.

== See also ==
- Indian National Congress breakaway parties
- Indian National Congress (R)
