= Perumbavoor Assembly constituency =

Constituency of the Kerala legislative assembly in India

Perumbavoor
- Constituency No. 74 for the Kerala Legislative Assembly
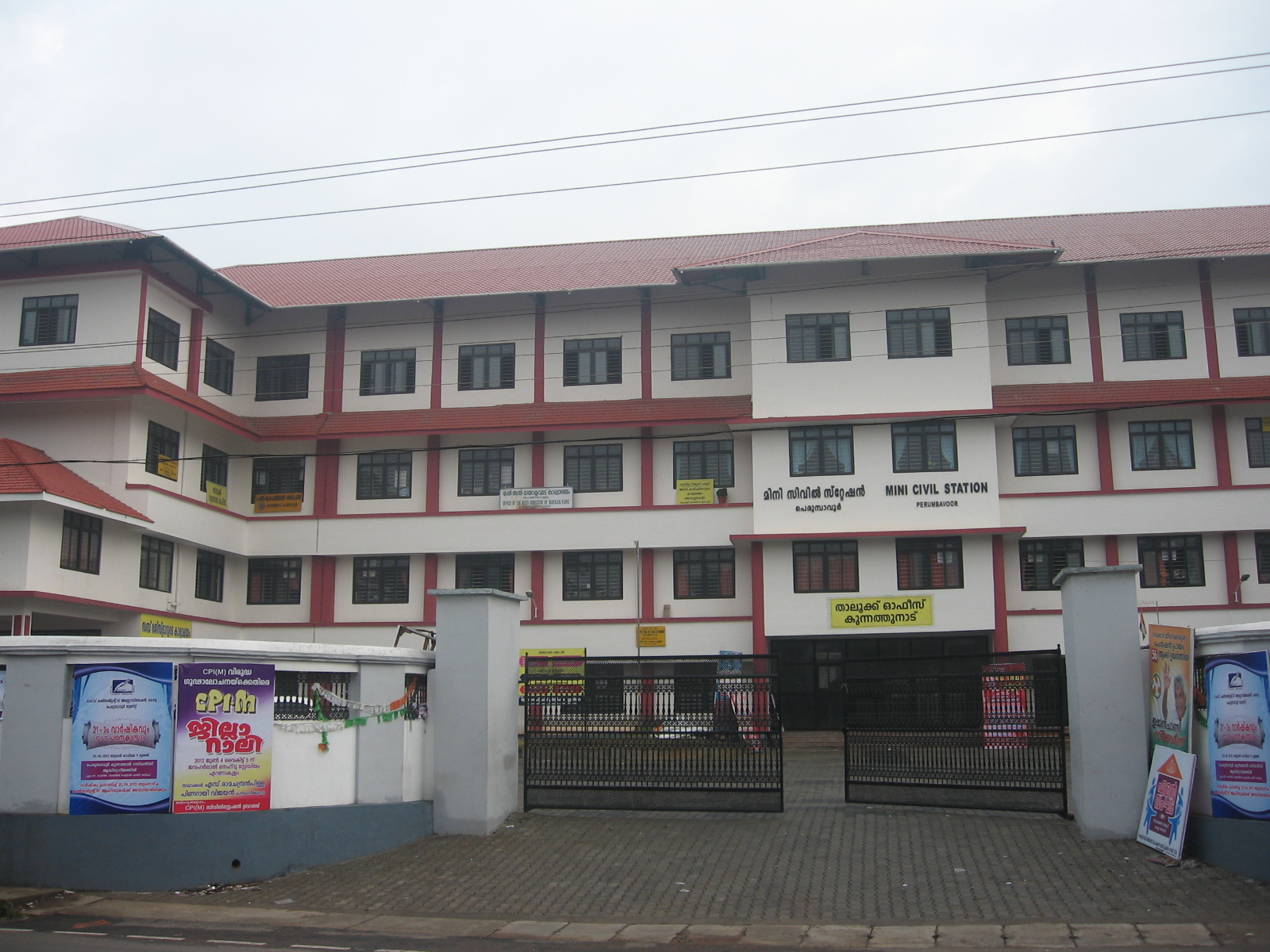
- The Kunnathunad taluk headquarters office and Mini-Civil Station at Perumbavoor

Constituency details
- Country: India
- Region: South India
- State: Kerala
- District: Ernakulam
- Established: 1957
- Total electors: 1,80,299 (2026)
- Reservation: None

Member of Legislative Assembly
- 16th Kerala Legislative Assembly
- Incumbent Manoj Moothedan
- Party: INC
- Alliance: UDF
- Elected year: 2026

Perumbavoor State assembly constituency is one of the 140 state legislative assembly constituencies in Kerala in southern India. It is also one of the seven state legislative assembly constituencies included in Chalakudy Lok Sabha constituency. As of the 2026 Assembly elections, the current MLA is Manoj Moothedan of INC.

== Local self-governed segments ==
Perumbavoor Assembly constituency is composed of the following local self-governed segments:

Sl no.	Name	Status (Grama panchayat/Municipality)	Taluk
1	Perumbavoor	Municipality	Kunnathunad
2	Asamannoor	Grama panchayat	Kunnathunad
3	Koovappady	Grama panchayat	Kunnathunad
4	Mudakkuzha	Grama panchayat	Kunnathunad
5	Okkal	Grama panchayat	Kunnathunad
6	Rayamangalam	Grama panchayat	Kunnathunad
7	Vengola	Grama panchayat	Kunnathunad
8	Vengoor	Grama panchayat	Kunnathunad

== Members of Legislative Assembly ==
The following list contains all members of Kerala Legislative Assembly who have represented the constituency:

Election	Niyama Sabha	Name	Party	Tenure
1957	1st	P. Govinda Pillai	Communist Party of India	1957 – 1960
1960	2nd	K. M. Chacko	Indian National Congress	1960 – 1965
1967	3rd	P. Govinda Pillai	Communist Party of India	1967 – 1970
1970	4th	P. I. Poulose	Indian National Congress	1970 – 1977
1977	5th	P. R. Sivan	Communist Party of India	1977 – 1980
1980	6th	P. R. Sivan	Communist Party of India	1980 – 1982
1982	7th	P. P. Thankachan	Indian National Congress	1982 – 1987
1987	8th	P. P. Thankachan	Indian National Congress	1987 – 1991
1991	9th	P. P. Thankachan	Indian National Congress	1991 – 1996
1996	10th	P. P. Thankachan	Indian National Congress	1996 – 2001
2001	11th	Saju Paul	Communist Party of India	2001 – 2006
2006	12th	Saju Paul	Communist Party of India	2006 – 2011
2011	13th	Saju Paul	Communist Party of India	2011 – 2016
2016	14th	Eldose Kunnappilly	Indian National Congress	2016 - 2021
2021	15th	Eldose Kunnappilly	Indian National Congress	2021 - 2026
2026	16th	Manoj Moothedan	Indian National Congress	Incumbent

== Election results ==
Percentage change (±%) denotes the change in the number of votes from the immediate previous election.

=== 2026 ===
There were 1,80,299 registered voters in the constituency for the 2026 Kerala Assembly election.

2026 Kerala Legislative Assembly election: Perumbavoor
Party	Candidate	Votes	%	±%
INC	Manoj Moothedan	75,088	50.9	▲13.8
KC(M)	Basil Paul	46654	31.62	▼3.47
TTP	Jibi Pathickal	22497	15.25	▲1.01
BSP	Adv. Prasanth	657	1.73	−
Independent	Eldho George	1562	1.06	−
Independent	Mohanan M. A.	226	0.15	−
NOTA	None of the above	845	0.57	▲0.08
Margin of victory		28434	10.33	▲8.32
Turnout		147529	81.82	▲3.68
INC hold		Swing	▲13.8	

=== 2021 ===
There were 1,84,514 registered voters in the constituency for the 2021 Kerala Assembly election.

2021 Kerala Legislative Assembly election: Perumbavoor
Party	Candidate	Votes	%	±%
INC	Eldose Kunnapilly	53,484	37.10	▼7.01
KC(M)	Babu Joseph Perumbavoor	50,585	35.09	−
Twenty 20 Party	Chithra Sukumaran	20,536	14.24	New
BJP	T. P. Sindhumol	15,135	10.50	▼3.04
SDPI	Ajmal K. Mujeeb	2,494	1.73	▲0.32
WPOI	K. M. Arshad	1,038	0.72	▲0.05
NOTA	None of the above	703	0.49	−
Independent	Babu Joseph Erumala	196	0.14	−
Margin of victory		2,899	2.01%	▼2.85
Turnout		1,44,171	78.14	▼6.11
INC hold		Swing	▼7.01	

=== 2016 ===
There were 1,72,965 registered voters in the constituency for the 2016 Kerala Assembly election.

2016 Kerala Legislative Assembly election: Perumbavoor
Party	Candidate	Votes	%	±%
INC	Eldose Kunnapilly	64,285	44.11	▼0.63
CPI(M)	Saju Paul	57,197	39.25	▼8.17
BJP	E. S. Biju	19,731	13.54	▲9.19
SDPI	V. V. Shoukkath Ali	2,061	1.41	▼0.50
WPOI	Thomas K. George	971	0.67	−
NOTA	None of the above	831	0.57	−
Independent	John Peruvathanam	385	0.26	−
Independent	M. M. Yoosaf	134	0.09	−
Independent	P. K. Sivan	132	0.09	−
Margin of victory		7,088	4.86%	
Turnout		1,45,727	84.25	▲2.83
INC gain from CPI(M)		Swing		

=== 2011 ===
There were 1,54,432 registered voters in the constituency for the 2011 election.

2011 Kerala Legislative Assembly election: Perumbavoor
Party	Candidate	Votes	%	±%
CPI(M)	Saju Paul	59,628	47.42	
INC	Jaison Joseph	56,246	44.73	−
BJP	O. C. Asokan	5,464	4.35	
SDPI	O Aliyar	2,401	1.90	
PDP	N. K. Muhammed Haji	1,094	0.87	−
SS	P. N. Sunilkumar	494	0.39	−
CPI(ML)L	Bindu Jayan	412	0.33	
Margin of victory		3,382	2.69	
Turnout		1,25,739	81.42	
CPI(M) hold		Swing		

== See also ==
- Perumbavoor
- Ernakulam district
- List of constituencies of the Kerala Legislative Assembly
- 2016 Kerala Legislative Assembly election
