= Kuruppampady =

- village
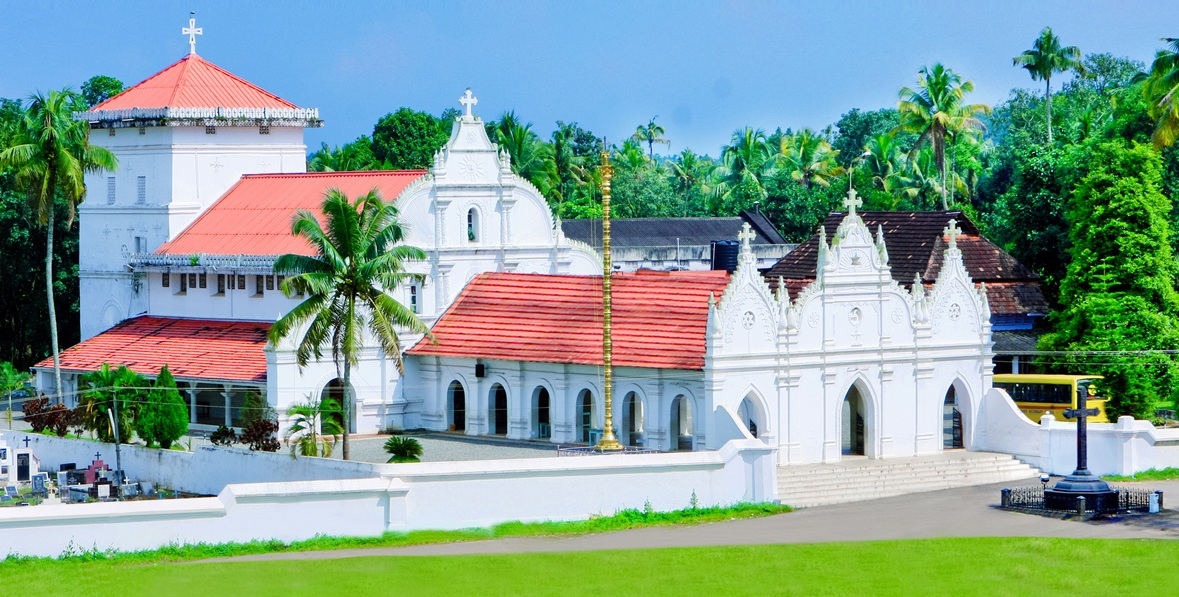
- Kuruppampady Palli (St. Mary's Jacobite Syrian Cathedral, Kuruppampady)

- Location in Kerala, India Kuruppampady (India)
- Coordinates: 10.1125°N 76.5166°E
- Country: India
- State: Kerala
- District: Ernakulam

Languages
  - Official: Malayalam, English
- Time zone: UTC+5:30 (IST)
- PIN: 683545
- Telephone code: 0484
- Vehicle registration: KL-40
- Nearest city: Cochin
- Lok Sabha constituency: Chalakkudy

Kuruppampady is situated about five kilometers from Perumbavoor on the Aluva-Munnar road, in Kunnathunad Taluk, Ernakulam district, Kerala, India.

== Location ==
It is surrounded by important places viz. Perumbavoor, Kalady, Malayattoor, Angamaly, Aluva, Muvattupuzha, Odakkaly, Kallil, Iringole kavu (miniature forest), Kolencherry, Kottapady, Kothamangalam, Alattuchira, Vengoor, Kombanad, Panamkuzhy, Poru, Vengola, Paniyely, Kodanad, Kurichilakode and so on and so forth within 20 kilometers' radius. Kuruppampady is also famous for its lemon grass production for about a century.

The village is known for the ancient St. Marys Jacobite Syrian Cathedral, more commonly known as Kuruppampady Palli. It also has two temples: Iricvichira siva temple and Kootumadhom temple.

Kerala Vyapari Vyavasayi Ekopana Samithi office, Kuruppampady private bus stand, Court, District institutional training centre for teachers DIET Ernakulam, Krishna hospital, Hotel Hamilton International, Koovapady block office, Mini industrial village, Tech steel industries, Bank of India, Federal bank, South Indian Bank, Dhanalaxmi bank, State Bank of India etc., are the important landmarks in town.
