= St. Mary's Jacobite Syrian Cathedral, Kuruppampady =

Marth Mariam Cathedral, Kuruppampady
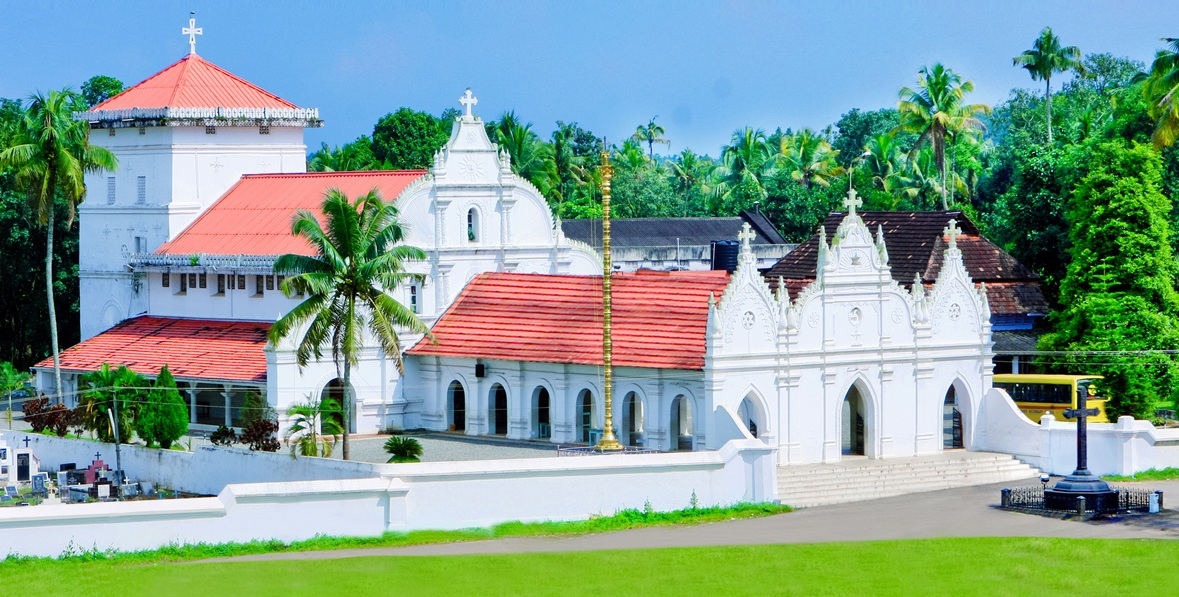
- Kuruppampady Pally

- Location within Kerala Location within India
- 10.1110°N 76.5218°E
- Location: Kuruppampady, Ernakulam, India
- Denomination: Jacobite Syrian Christian Church

History
- Status: Valiyapally

Architecture
- Style: Kerala Architecture

Administration
- District: Ernakulam
- Province: Kerala

St. Mary's Cathedral, popularly known as Kuruppampady Pally is situated at Kuruppampady, 4 km east of Perumbavoor in the Kunnathunadu Taluk of Ernakulam district.

The Kuruppampady cathedral is one among the older churches of the Malankara Church in the Ernakulam district, Kerala. The church was established around 1300 AD by a group of Christian families who were members of the Kanjoor church residing at Kuruppampady.

== History ==
Though there is no historical proof available; it is believed that the church was established around AD 1300 (Rt. Rev. Gheevarghese Cor Episcopa, Athumkal, in his book "Kuruppampady palliyude Charithram" - page 23). As in the case of many other churches, the experts have difference in opinion about the date of establishment of church and that are, AD 1067, 1150, 1300 and 1355. (Refer the book "Kuruppampady Pally" page 15 written by T. V. Mathews-Thanelimalil)

The church got established with the help of a member of the Kulangara Akathoot Kuruppu’s family who were the prominent chieftain Hindu family of the locality. One of two surviving ladies of the Kuruppu's family, who was childless, due to the influence of the Christians, undertook that if she bore a child she would build a church in the name of Mother Mary. When she gave birth to a child, she and her child became Christians at the Kanjoor Church. Later, they along with the local Christians and with the help, support and patronage of the Kulangara Akathoot Kuruppu, built the church in the name of Mother Mary. As the church was built at the gateway (pady means gate) of the Kuruppu with their patronage, it was called the Kuruppampady church. The earlier families of the church were Puthussery, Edassery, Padayattil and Kulangara.

Initially the church was built in the form of a temple. The jurisdiction of the church roughly covered the area up to Vengoor in the north, Kottapaddy in the east, Keezhillam in the south and up to Valampoor and Perumbavoor in the west. The administration of the church was in the hands of the Palliyogam that consisted of the priest and four trustees belonging to prominent families.
