= Eldhose Kunnappilly =

Indian politician

Member of Kerala Legislative Assembly
- In office 2 June 2016 – April 2026
- Preceded by: Saju Paul
- Succeeded by: Manoj Moothedan
- Constituency: Perumbavoor

Personal details
- Party: Indian National Congress

Eldhose Kunnappilly is a politician from the state of Kerala in India. He is a member of Indian National Congress party. He was elected to the Kerala state legislative assembly in 2016 from the Constituency of Perumbavoor. He was also the District Panchayath president of Ernakulam from 2010 to 2015.
