= Alattuchira =

- Village
- Location in Kerala, India Alattuchira (India)
- Coordinates: 10°10′N 76°32′E
- Country: India
- State: Kerala
- District: Ernakulam

Government
  - Body: Koovappady Panchayath

Languages
  - Official: Malayalam, English
- Time zone: UTC+5:30 (IST)
- PIN: 683544
- Vehicle registration: KL- & KL 40
- Nearest city: Perumbavoor
- Lok Sabha constituency: Chalakudy
- Vidhan Sabha constituency: Perumbavoor
- Civic agency: Koovappady Panchayath

Alattuchira is a village in Ernakulam district, Kerala, India, situated 2 km east of Kodanad.

== Location ==
Situated about 50 km from Kochi and 15 km away from Perumbavoor on the northern side on the bank of the Periyar River. The nearest railway station is Angamaly (20 km) and Cochin International Airport is 16 km from Alattuchira. Angamaly, Muvattupuzha, Kothamangalam, Kerala, Aluva are towns situated close to Alattuchira, apart from Perumbavoor.

== Education ==
St. Marys LP School & Bethlehem St. Marys Church are located in the heart of Alattuchira. St George Chappel Nedumpara is well known. Dhanya Arts and Sports club is the favourite hang out place of the people.

== Tourism ==
The International Christian Pilgrim Center Malayattoor and tourist spot Kodanad are close. Paniyely Waterfalls are 6 km away and Panumkuzhy is one km away.

== Politics ==
Alattuchira comes under the Perumbavoor Legislative Assembly represented by Mr.Eldhose Kunnappilly and comes under Chalakudy Lok Sabha constituency. It is the border village of Koovappady Panchayath .

== Transportation ==
The village is well connected with roads and private buses operating every 10 minutes to nearby towns. Alattuchira is inhabited mainly by people from Christian and Hindu communities.

== Economy ==
The people of Alattchira are mainly into Agriculture and cultivate commodities like rice, rubber, pepper, ginger, Turmeric, plantain, vegetables, Coconut, Nutmeg, and cocoa.
