= Saju =

Saju is an Indian masculine given name that may refer to

- Saju Kodiyan, Indian mimicry artist, comedian and television host
- Saju Navodaya, Indian film actor
- Saju Paul, Indian politician

Saju may also refer to:

- Saju (divination), or Four Pillars of Destiny, divination based on the two sexagenary cycle Chinese characters assigned to a particular time of birth
