= V. Balan =

Indian artist (1942 – 2002)

- Born: 1942; Perumbavoor, Ernakulam, Kerala, India
- Died: 2002 (aged 59–60)
- Occupations: Painter, sculptor, architect,
- Parent(s): Venketachelam Pillai and Chellamma

V. Balan (17 October 1942 – 22 January 2002) was a sculptor and painter from India. He was born the son of Chellamma and Venketachelam Pillai Perumbavoor, Kerala. In 1962 he graduated from and began teaching at the Cochin School of Art. In 1970 he moved to Chennai, where he created a mosaic for a chapel of Salesian Provincialate. From 1972 he started designing the interiors of churches throughout India.

Ten years later he moved to Bangalore and established his studio, Arte Sacra, near the National Biblical, Catechetical and Liturgical Centre.
