= Chembarakky =

- town
- Location in Kerala, India Chembarakky (India)
- Coordinates: 10.088°N 76.426°E
- Country: India
- State: Kerala
- District: Ernakulam

Languages
  - Official: Malayalam, English
- Time zone: UTC+5:30 (IST)
- Vehicle registration: KL-40/41

Chembarakky is a town in Ernakulam district, Kerala, India on Aluva-Munnar Road (Kerala State Highway 16) between Perumbavoor and Aluva. Chembarakky Junction is where the bus route to Ernakulam from diverges from Perumbavoor-Aluva route.

== Organizations ==
- Muthoot Fincorp Limited
- Thadiyittaparambu Police Station
- Jamia Hassania Public School
- Thazkiya International School

== Religious places ==
- St: George Jacobite Church, Chembarakky
- Chembarakky Juma Masjid
- Markazhul Buzhura chembarakky
