= Chelamattom =

- village
- Location in Kerala, India Chelamattom (India)
- Coordinates: 10.141140°N 76.462921°E
- Country: India
- State: Kerala
- District: Ernakulam

Population (2011)
  - Total: 16,844

Languages
  - Official: Malayalam, English
- Time zone: UTC+5:30 (IST)

Chelamattom is a suburban region of Kochi city in Ernakulam district in the Indian state of Kerala. Chelamattom Shree Krishna Swami Temple is one of the main temple situated here.

== Demographics ==
As of 2011 India census, Chelamattom had a population of 16,844 with 8,346 males and 8,498 females.
