= Chelamattom Shree Krishna Swami Temple =

Temple in Ernakulam District, Kerala, India

Chelamattom Sree Krishna Temple
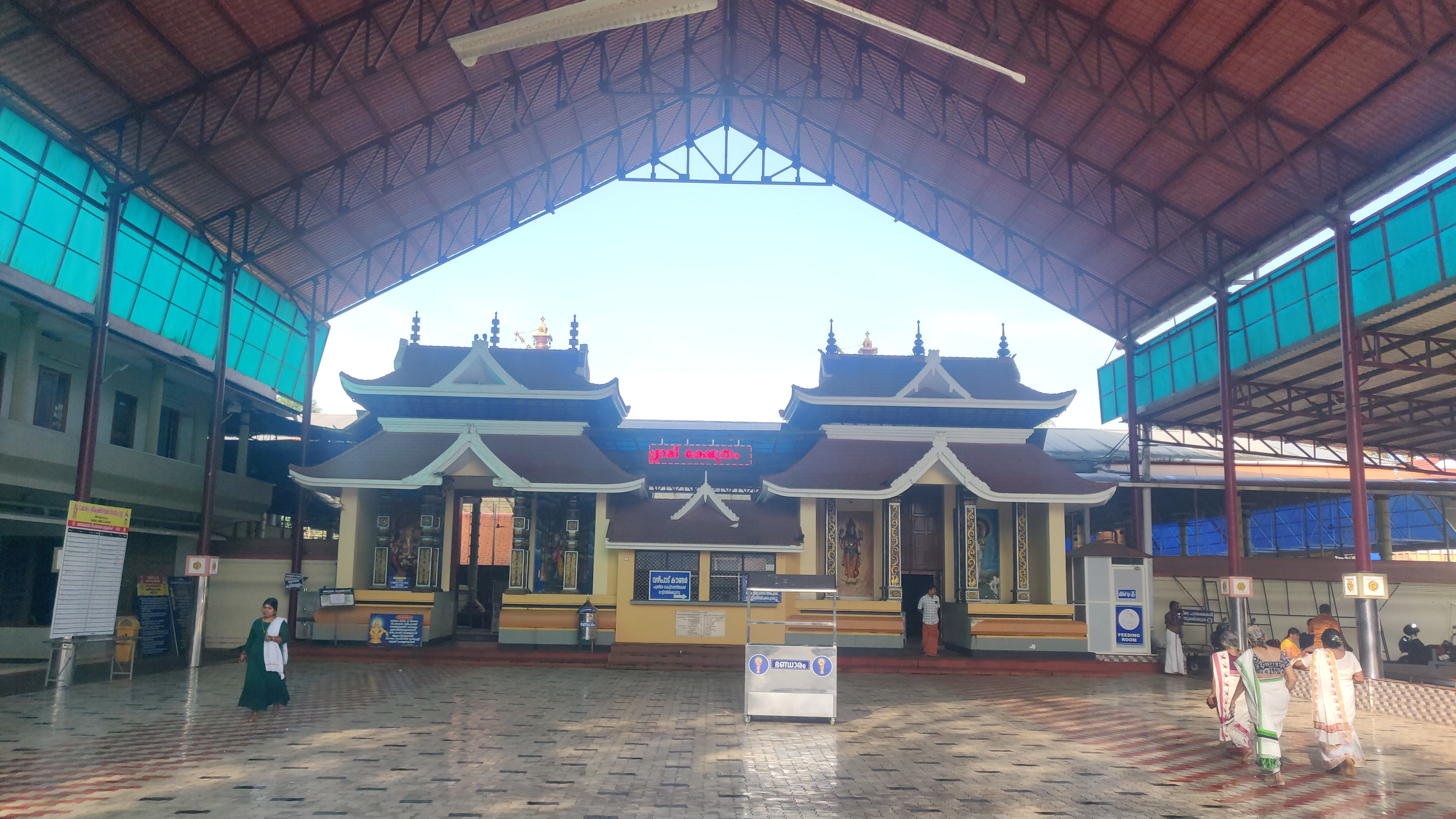
- Entrance of Chelamattom Sree Krishna Temple

- Location within Kerala

Religion
- Affiliation: Hinduism
- District: Ernakulam
- Deity: Lord Krishna & Narasimha
- Festival: Main Festival,

Location
- Location: Chelamattom
- State: Kerala
- Country: India
- Coordinates: 10°8′19.14″N 76°27′15.33″E

Chelamattom Sree Krishna Temple is a Hindu temple situated in Chelamattom, Kalady, in Ernakulam district, Kerala. This temple is situated near the banks of the Periyar River. This temple is known as Dakshina Kasi. The main deity in this temple is Sree Krishna.

The temple has stone carvings and bronze deepa stambhams. The bali tharpanam ritual is performed in this temple.
