= Koovappady =

Koovappady, Vallom
- village
- Location in Kerala, India
- Coordinates: 10°9′0″N 76°29′0″E
- Country: India
- State: Kerala
- District: Ernakulam

Population (2011)
  - Total: 29,339

Languages
  - Official: Malayalam, English
- Time zone: UTC+5:30 (IST)
- PIN: 683544
- Vehicle registration: KL 40
- Nearest city: Perumbavoor
- Lok Sabha constituency: Chalakkudy
- Vidhan Sabha constituency: perumbavoor

Koovappady is a village in Vallom, Perumbavoor ,Ernakulam district in the Indian state of Kerala.

Koovappady is around 8 km north of Perumbavoor and is near to the Kodanadu elephant training centre. Other places of interest nearby include Kalady, the birthplace of Sankaracharya, and Malayattoor. Ganpati Vilasam High School is famous here.

== Education Centre ==
1. Peniel Bible Seminary And Missionary Training Centre
2. Government Polytechnic collage, Perumbavoor

== Temples of Koovapaddy ==
1. Aimury Siva Temple famous for the great Nandi idol named Brihat Nandi.
2. Cheranelloor Siva temple
3. Ganapathy temple https://web.archive.org/web/20130603022438/http://koovappadymahaganapathytemple.org/
4. Thottuva Sri Dhanwanthari Temple
5. Pullamveli Kavu, Bhagavathy temple
6. Kallarakkal Mahavishnu Mahadeva Temple
7. Chelattu Sri Mookambika Temple
8. Pisharickal Bhagavathy Temple
9. Kottakkal Edmanakavu Bhagavathy Temple

== Demographics ==
As of 2011 India census, Koovappady had a population of 29339 with 14634 males and 14705 females.
