= P. P. Thankachan =

Indian politician from Kerala (1939–2025)

President of the Kerala Pradesh Congress Committee
- In office 2004
- Preceded by: K. Muraleedharan
- Succeeded by: Thennala Balakrishna Pillai

Minister for Agriculture, Government of Kerala
- In office 3 May 1995 – 9 May 1996
- Chief Minister: A. K. Antony
- Preceded by: P. P. George
- Succeeded by: V. K. Rajan

Speaker of Kerala Legislative Assembly
- In office 1 July 1991 – 2 May 1995
- Chief Minister: K. Karunakaran
- Preceded by: Varkala Radhakrishnan
- Succeeded by: Therambil Ramakrishnan

Member of Kerala Legislative Assembly
- In office 1982–2001
- Preceded by: P.R. Sivan
- Succeeded by: Saju Paul
- Constituency: Perumbavoor

Personal details
- Born: 29 July 1939 Angamali, Kingdom of Cochin, India (present day Ernakulam District, Kerala, India)
- Died: 11 September 2025 (aged 86) Rajagiri Hospital,Aluva, Kochi, Kerala, India
- Party: Indian National Congress

Painadath Paulose Thankachan (29 July 1939 – 11 September 2025) was an Indian politician who belonged to the Indian National Congress party. He was elected to the Kerala Legislative Assembly in 1982 and also in the subsequent Assemblies of 1987, 1991 and 1996, all from Perumbavoor.

== Background ==
P. P. Thankachan was born on 29 July 1939, to the Painadath family at Angamali in the Ernakulam district. He is the son of Rev. Fr. Paulose Painadath of Jacobite Syrian Christian Church, and Annamma. He died at Aluva on 11 September 2025, at the age of 88.

== Political positions held ==
- Opposition Chief Whip (1987–91)
- Minister for Agriculture from 3 May 1995 to 9 May 1996.
- President, KPCC (2004)
- Chair of Speaker of Assembly in the 9th Kerala Legislative Assembly from 1 July 1991 to 3 May 1995
- UDF convener 2004–2018
