= Manoj Moothedan =

Indian politician

Manoj Moothedan is a politician from Kerala, India. He is a member of the Kerala Legislative Assembly. He represents Perumbavoor assembly constituency in 16th Kerala State Legislative Assembly. He belongs to Indian National Congress.
