= Saju Paul =

Indian politician

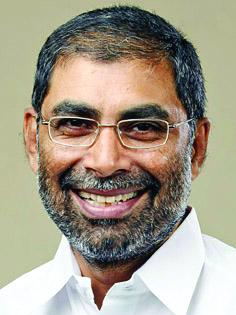

Member of Kerala Legislative Assembly
- In office 2001–2016
- Preceded by: P. P. Thankachan
- Succeeded by: Eldhose Kunnappilly
- Constituency: Perumbavoor

Personal details
- Born: 8 May 1966 (age 60) Pandappilly
- Party: Communist Party of India (Marxist)
- Spouse: Shiny
- Children: Three Daughters

Saju Paul (born 8 May 1966) is a leftist Indian politician, former Member of Kerala Legislative Assembly from Perumbavoor constituency, Kerala, India.

== Early life ==
He was born to Kunjamma and P. I. Paulose of Panthalangal house on 8 May 1966 at Pandappilly. His father Paulose was a former Member of Kerala Legislative Assembly.

== Career ==
He started his political career with Young Men Association, Public Library and Arts Society of Vengoor in 1983. Worked for Kerala Sasthra Sahithya Parishad, Ernakulam District Total Literacy Mission, Kuvappady Block Literacy Mission and Kalajatha Team of National Literacy Mission. He served as Member, President and Secretary of D.Y.F.I. Block committee, Member, Local and Area Committee Member, of C.P.I.(M), Secretary of C.P.I.(M), Vengoor Local Committee, Member, President and Secretary of D.Y.F.I. Block Committee and District Committee Member of D.Y.F.I. District Committee.
