= Perumbavoor =

Neighbourhood in Ernakulam, Kerala, India

- Municipality in Kochi
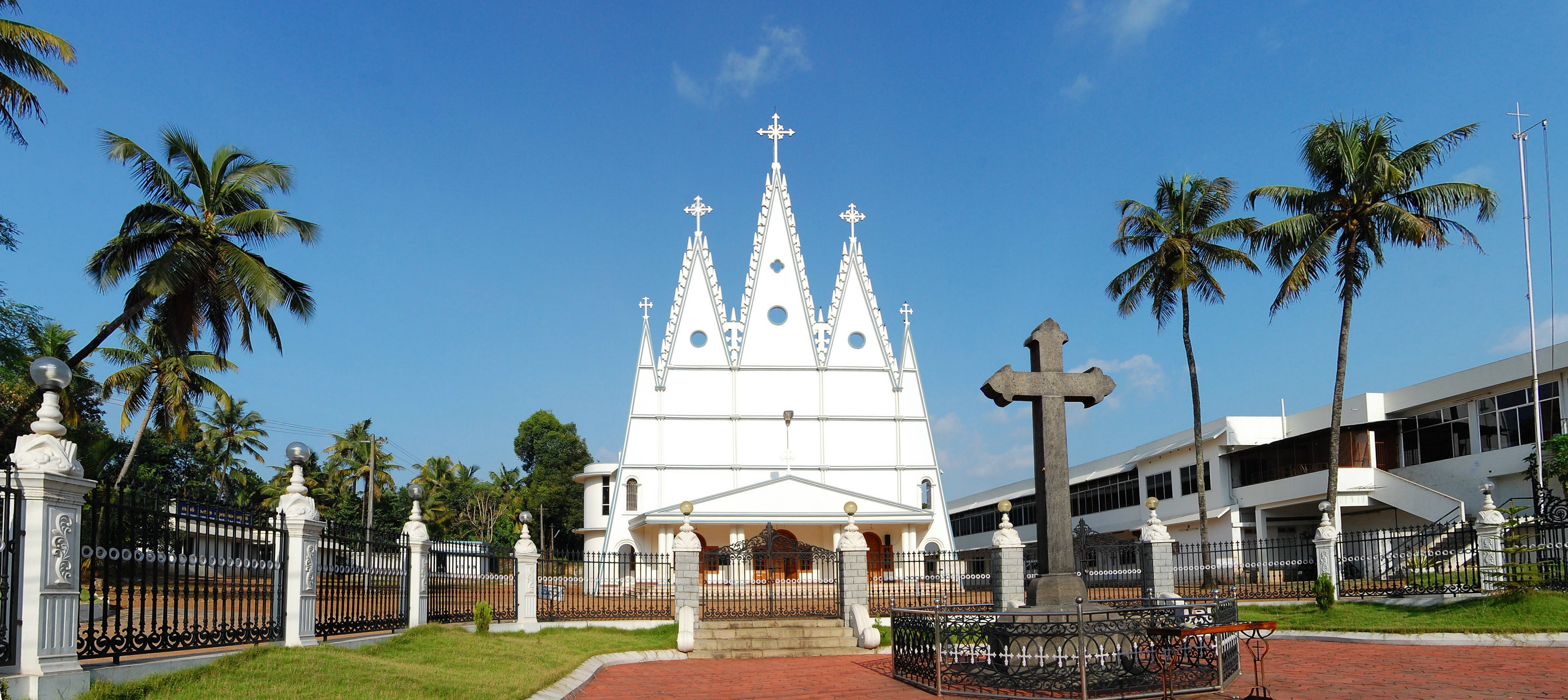
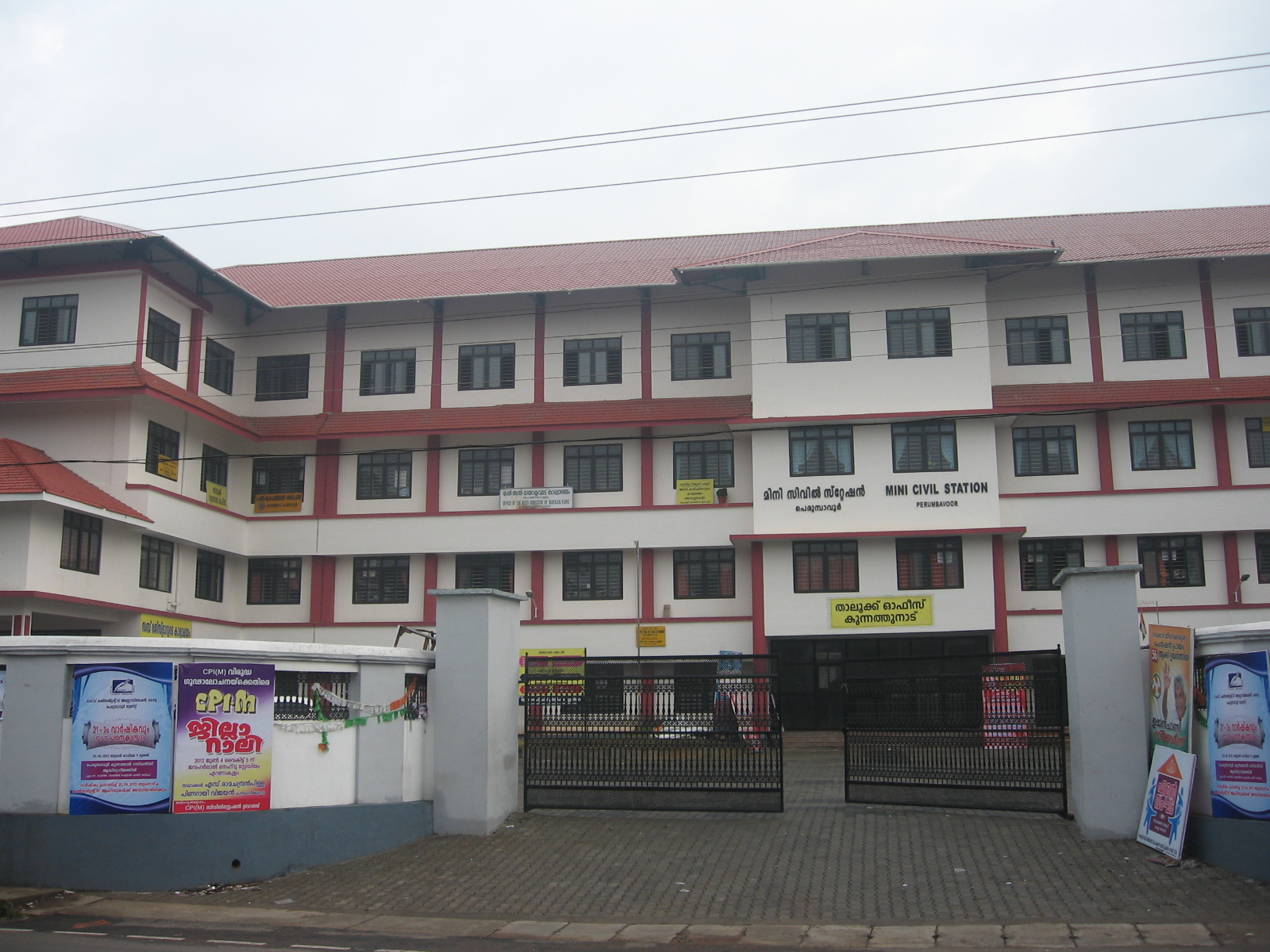
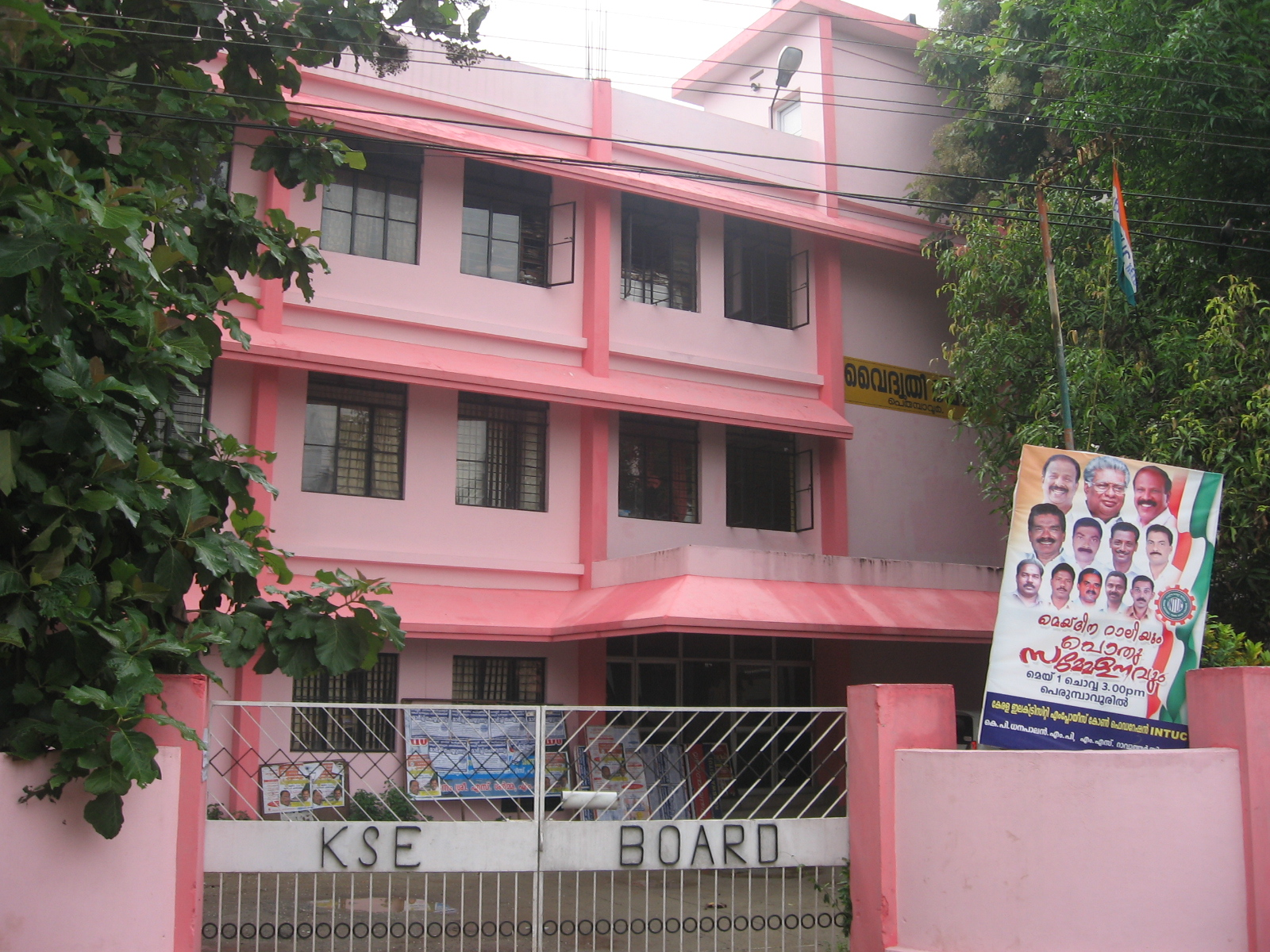
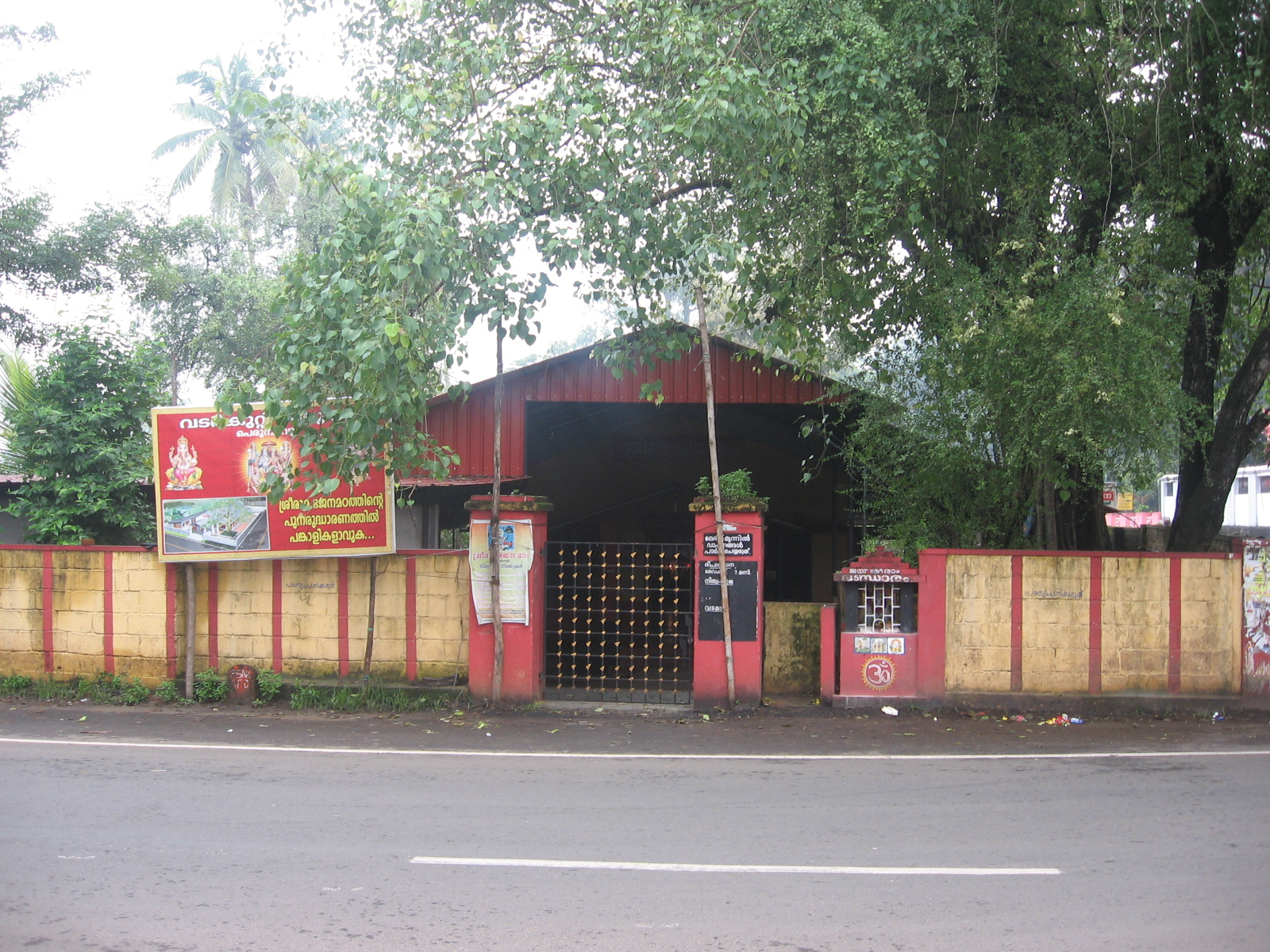
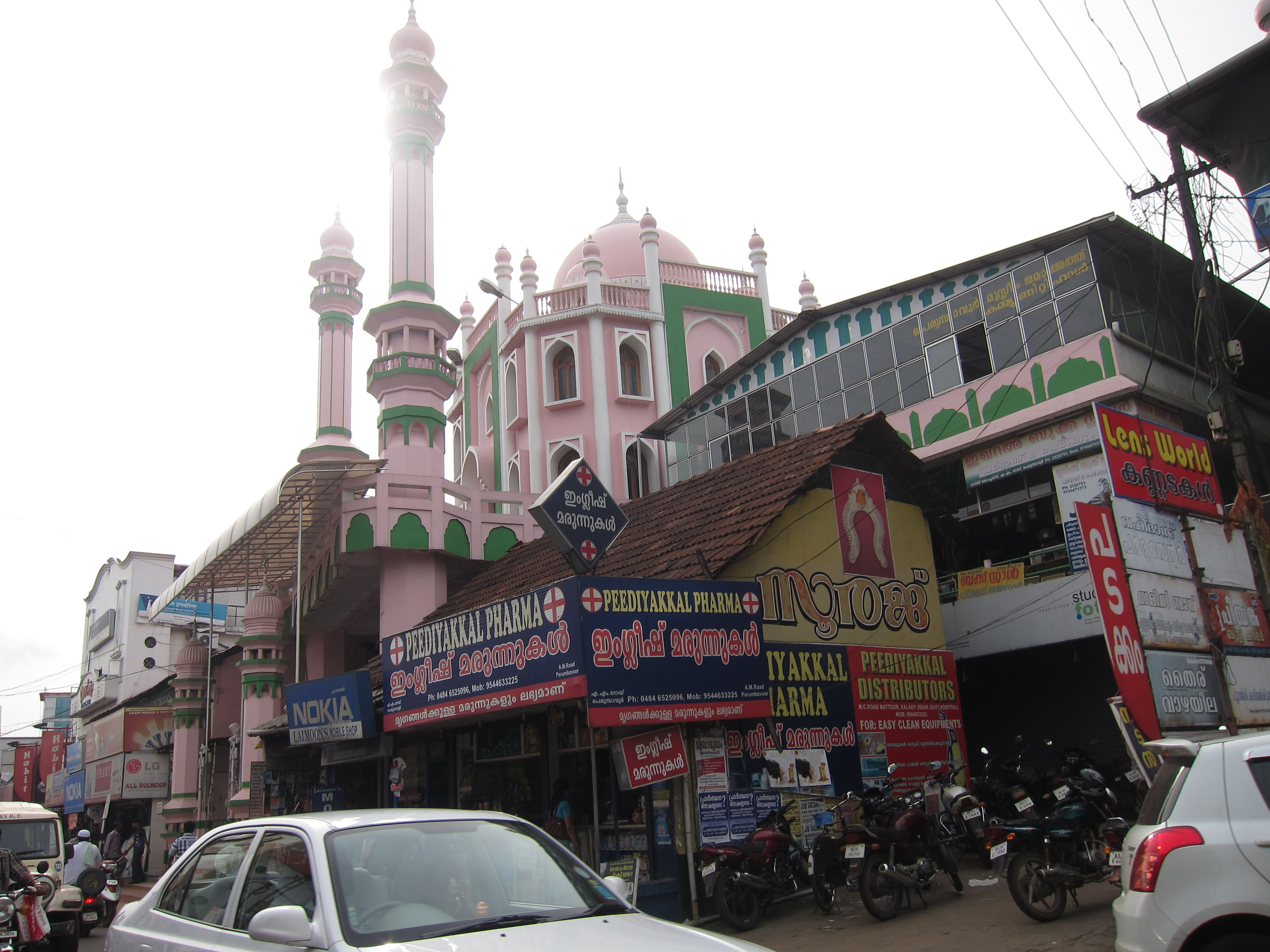
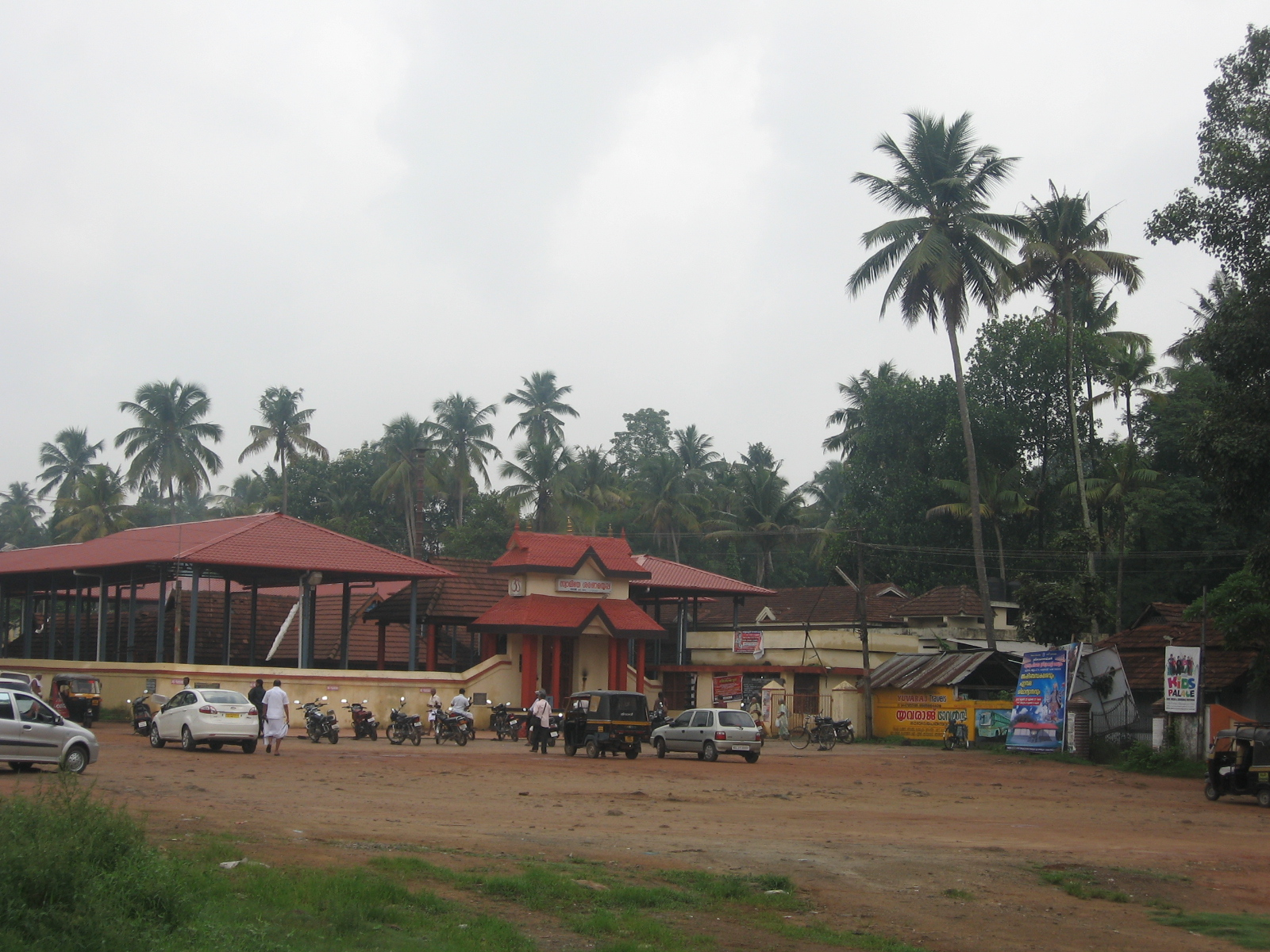
- Clockwise from top: Bethel Suloko Church; KSEB Office Perumbavoor; Juma Masjid; Perumbavoor Temple; Bhajana Madam; Taluk Office Kunnathunad

- Location in Kerala, India Perumbavoor (India)
- Coordinates: 10.11422°N 76.47749°E
- Country: India
- State: Kerala
- District: Ernakulam

Government
  - Type: Municipality
  - Municipal Chairperson: Sangeetha K N
  - Municipal Vice Chairman: Biju John Jacob

Area
  - Total: 13.61 km^{2} (5.25 sq mi)
- Elevation: 33 m (108 ft)

Population (2011)
  - Total: 28,110
  - Density: 2,065/km^{2} (5,349/sq mi)

Languages
  - Official: Malayalam, English
- Time zone: UTC+5:30 (IST)
- Postal code: 683542
- Telephone code: 0484
- Vehicle registration: KL-40
- Coastline: 0 kilometres (0 mi)
- Nearest city: Kochi
- Climate: Tropical monsoon (Köppen)
- Avg. summer temperature: 35 °C (95 °F)
- Avg. winter temperature: 20 °C (68 °F)
- Website: perumbavoormunicipality.lsgkerala.gov.in/en

Perumbavoor ([peɾumbaːʋuːr]) is a major town and municipality in the eastern part of the Kochi metropolitan area in the Indian state of Kerala. As per the 2011 census of India, Perumbavoor has a population of 28,110 people and is situated on the banks of the Periyar River basin. It serves as an important residential, commercial, and industrial centre in central Kerala. Perumbavoor has long been recognized as a gateway between the urban regions of Kochi and the agrarian highlands of eastern Ernakulam district. Kerala's largest centres for the timber trade and wood-based industries are located in Perumbavoor, earning a reputation as the state's plywood capital.

The town is also an important commercial hub serving the surrounding agricultural and plantation regions. Perumbavoor serves as the headquarters of Perumbavoor taluk and functions as a key administrative centre in eastern Ernakulam district. In recent decades, Perumbavoor has experienced substantial industrial and commercial growth and has become one of Kerala's principal destinations for migrant workers from other Indian states, primarily West Bengal, Assam, Bihar, and Odisha contributing significantly to its economy and demographic character. Estimates for their numbers in Perumbavoor vary widely, ranging from the low thousands to over one lakh.

== Operation Toofan ==
In June 2026, Perumbavoor became a major focus of Operation Toofan, a statewide anti-narcotics campaign launched by the Kerala Police. The operation involved repeated raids on labour camps, bus stands, commercial establishments and other locations suspected of involvement in drug trafficking. Police seized heroin, cannabis, MDMA, banned tobacco products and other contraband, and detained or arrested multiple suspects during the operation.

Police officials described Perumbavoor as an important drug distribution centre while cautioning against portraying the town as Kerala's "drug capital". Authorities stated that most migrant workers were law-abiding and that enforcement efforts were directed at organised trafficking networks rather than any particular community.

== History ==
Perumbavoor municipality was formed in 1936. It was one among the 4 Panchayats sanctioned by Sir C. P. Ramaswamy Iyer (Diwan-Thiruvithamcore). The others were Paravur, Nedumangad and Boothapandi. Perumbavoor constituency is one of the most Jacobite Christian-populated areas in India.

== Governance and administration ==
Perumbavoor Municipality was established on 1 January 1953. It administers an area of 13.605 km^{2} through 29 wards and has a population of 28,110.

The municipality is governed by an elected Municipal Council comprising 29 ward councillors. It is headed by a chairperson and a vice chairperson. The incumbent chairperson is Sangeetha K. N., and the vice chairperson is Binu John Jacob.

== Politics ==
Perumbavoor assembly constituency is a part of Chalakudy (Lok Sabha constituency). Manoj Moothedan is the current MLA from Perumbavoor and Benny Behanan is the current MP.

== Judicial institutions ==
Its jurisdiction formerly encompassed the towns of Alwaye and Kolenchery, which were separated later. It has a Judicial Magistrate of the First Class, Motor Accident Claims Tribunal, and Subordinate Judge's Court (Sub-court).

== Economy ==
Perumbavoor is a predominantly agricultural town and Asia's Largest plywood industry. The wood-based industry in Perumbavoor has its roots in the pre-independence period, when the town's proximity to the Periyar River and the surrounding high-range forests made it a natural hub for timber trade. Timber was transported by elephant from highland forests, floated down rivers, and processed at the town's "Chapra" area using handsaws before being shipped across Kerala by boat and cart. After Indian independence, the government began auctioning hardwood from public forests through the Mudickal timber depot, driving rapid growth in sawmills. When the commercial felling of forest wood was progressively restricted, the industry adapted: the spread of rubber plantations in central Kerala provided an alternative raw material, and by 1980 entrepreneurs began converting sawmills into veneer and plywood manufacturing units using rubberwood. This transition transformed Perumbavoor into one of India's most significant plywood manufacturing clusters, with over 1,000 units operating in the town and surrounding areas. Commodities like rubber, pepper, ginger, turmeric, plantain, vegetables, coconut, nutmeg, cocoa, rice, arecanut, cloves, etc., are traded every day in the local market. Most of these commodities are supplied to mainstream exporters in Kochi or to local retailers. The rest of the economy is shared by the government, the private sector, and small industries. Perumbavoor is an important city for the timber trade in Kerala.

== Image Gallery ==
Pictures of the town taken on 9 July 2012 at 8:00 AM. Historic images of the town are liked by all.

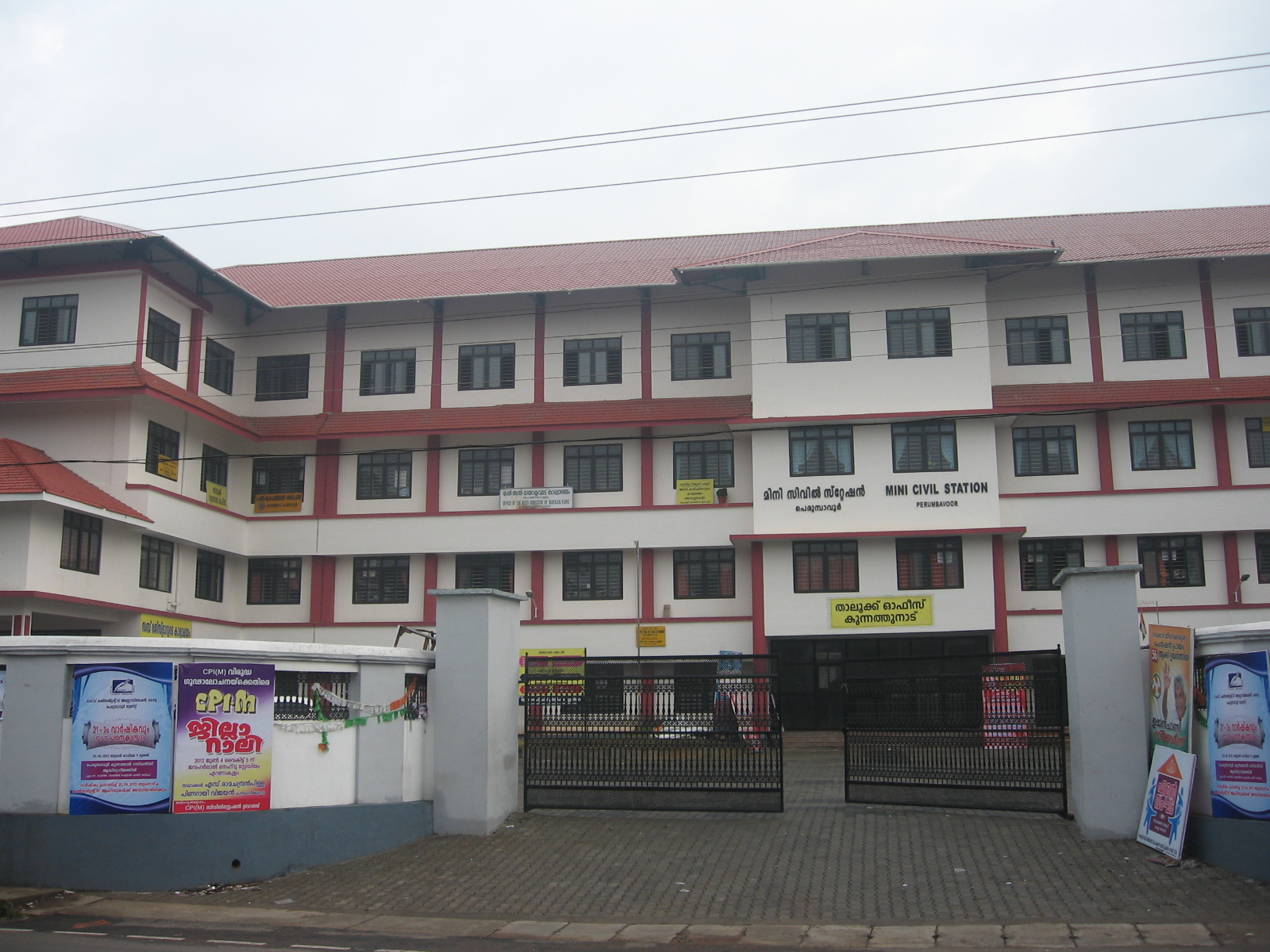
Perumbavoor Taluk Office Kunnathunad

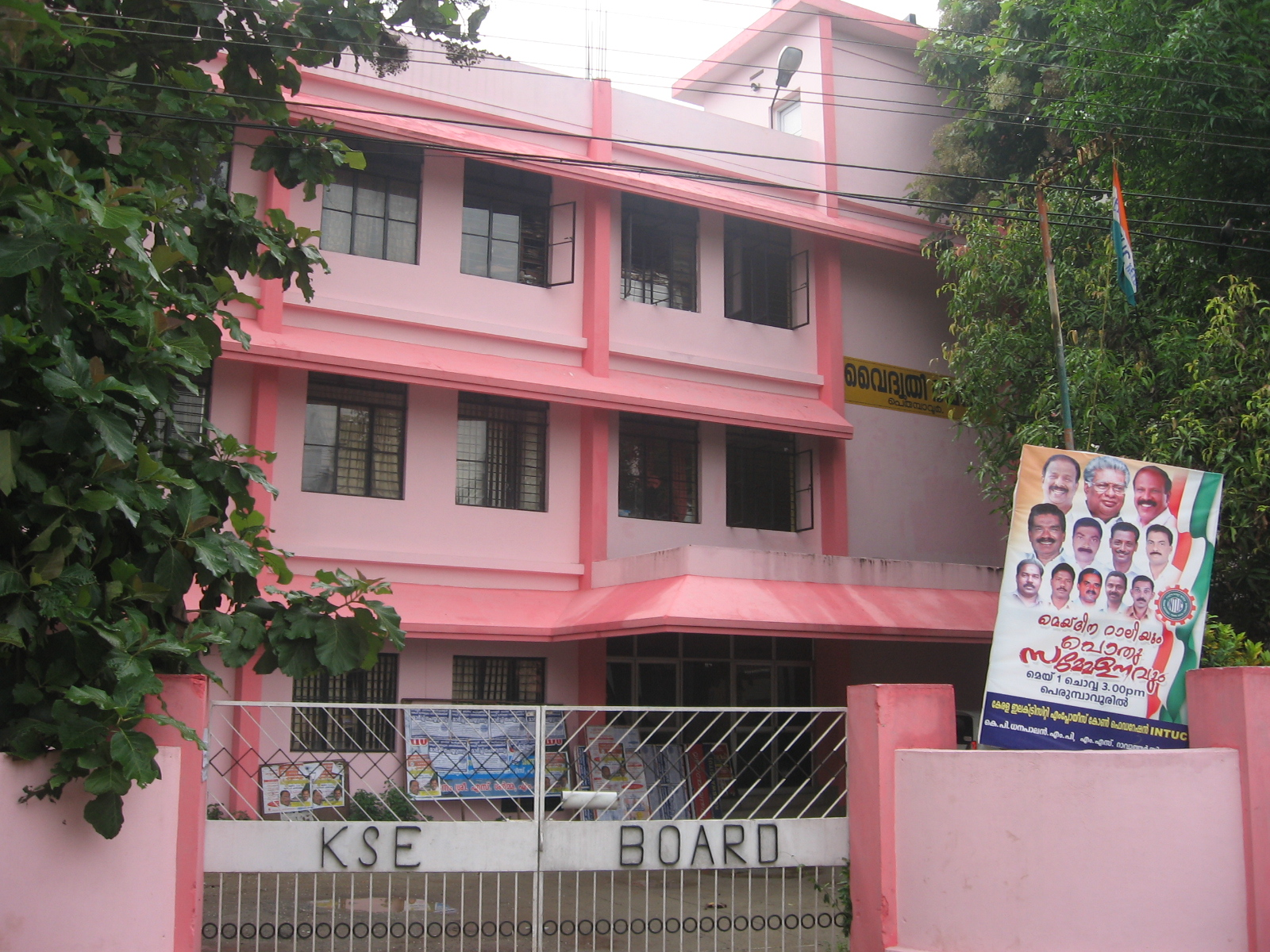
Perumbavoor KSEB

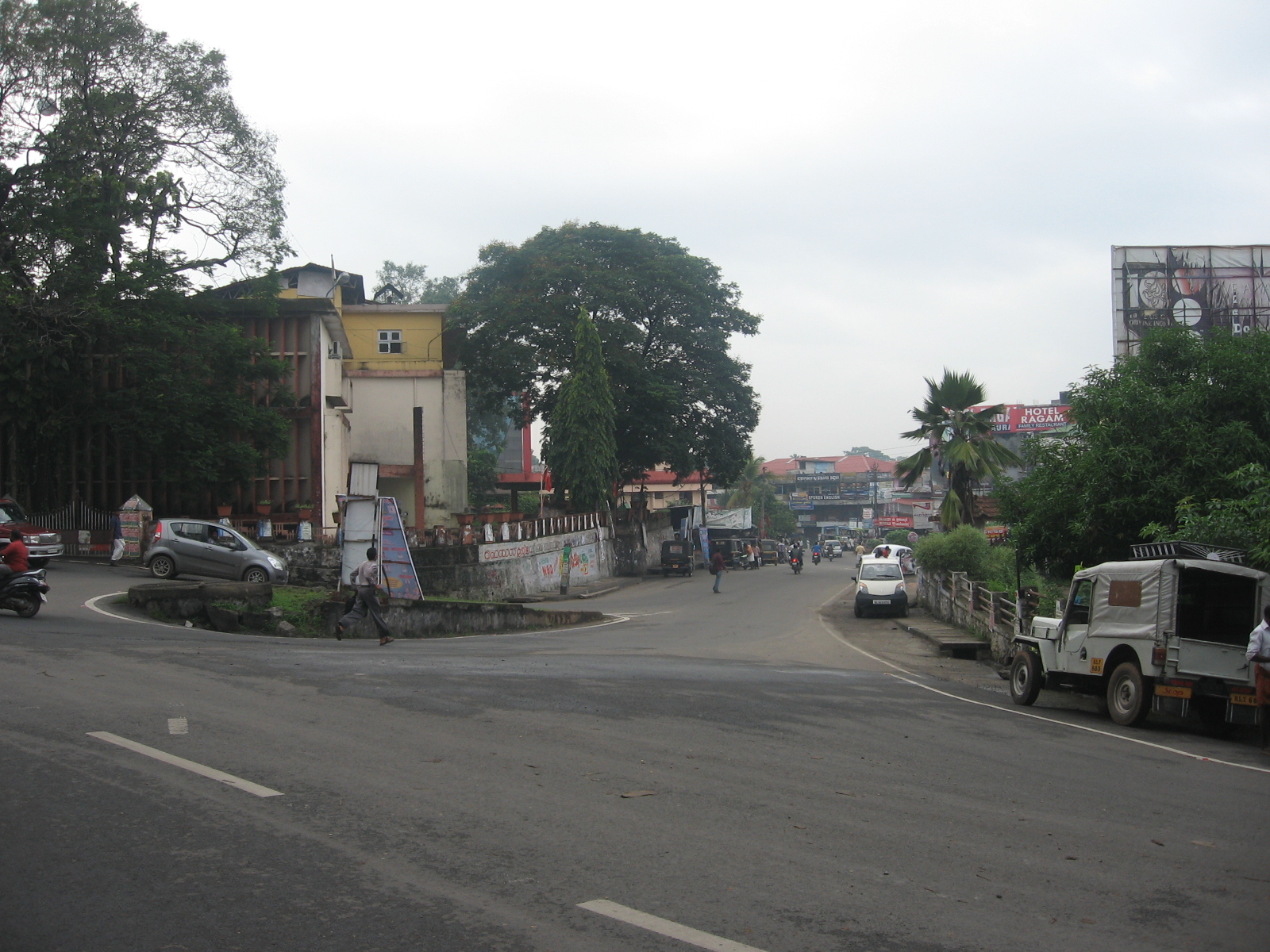
Perumbavoor Municipal Office

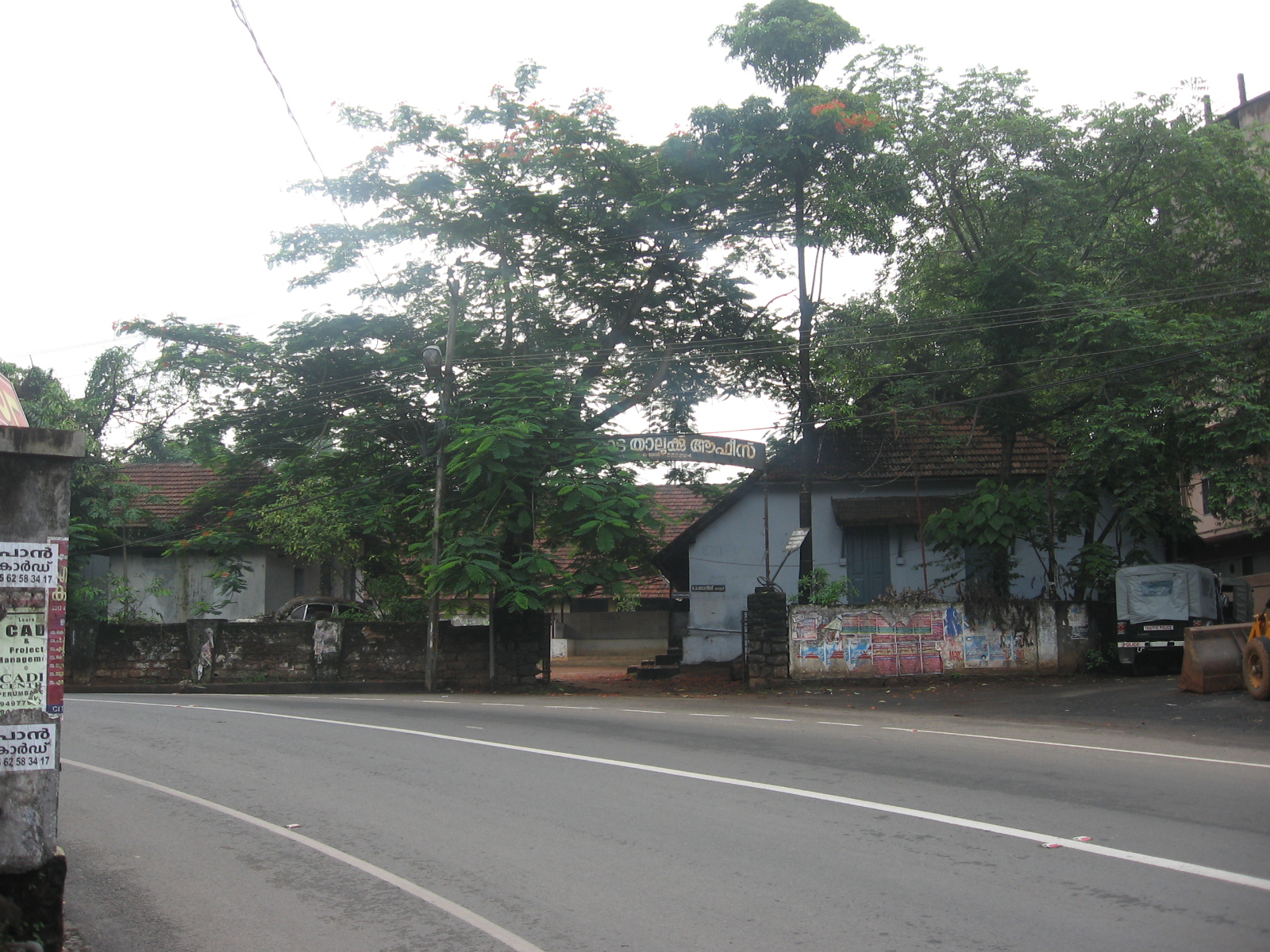
Old Perumbavoor Taluk Office

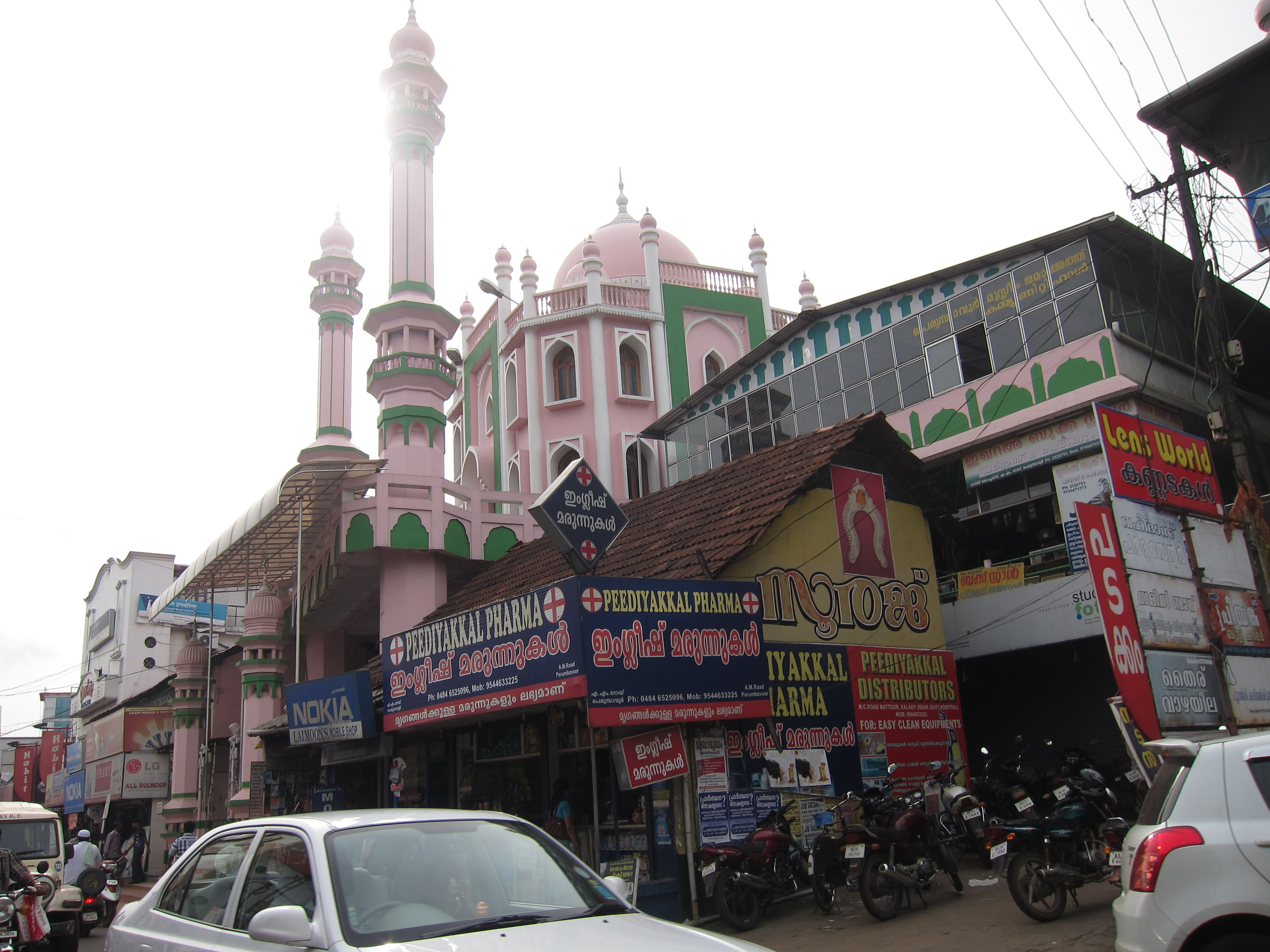
Town Juma-masjid

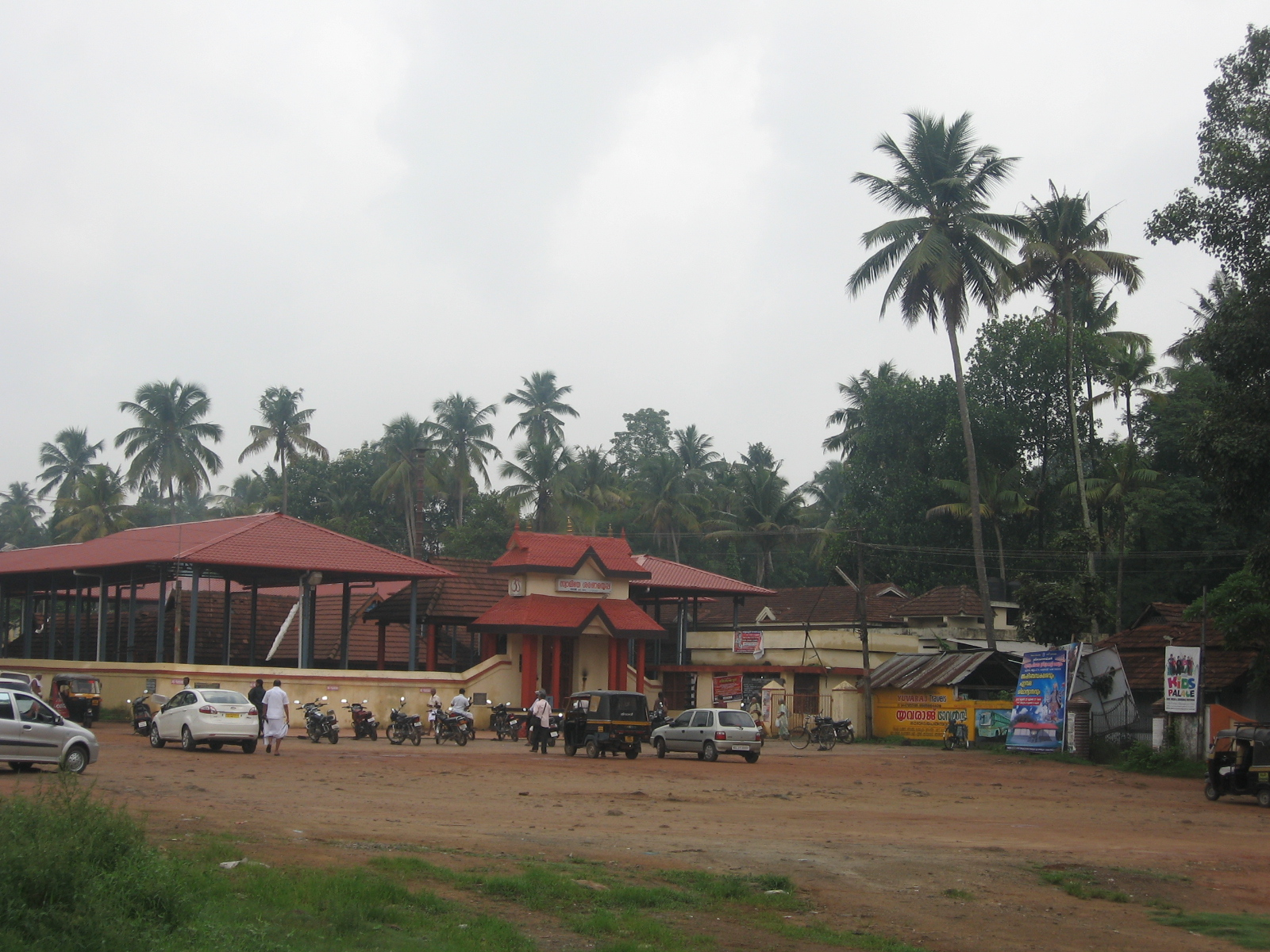
Perumbavoor Ambalam (Temple)

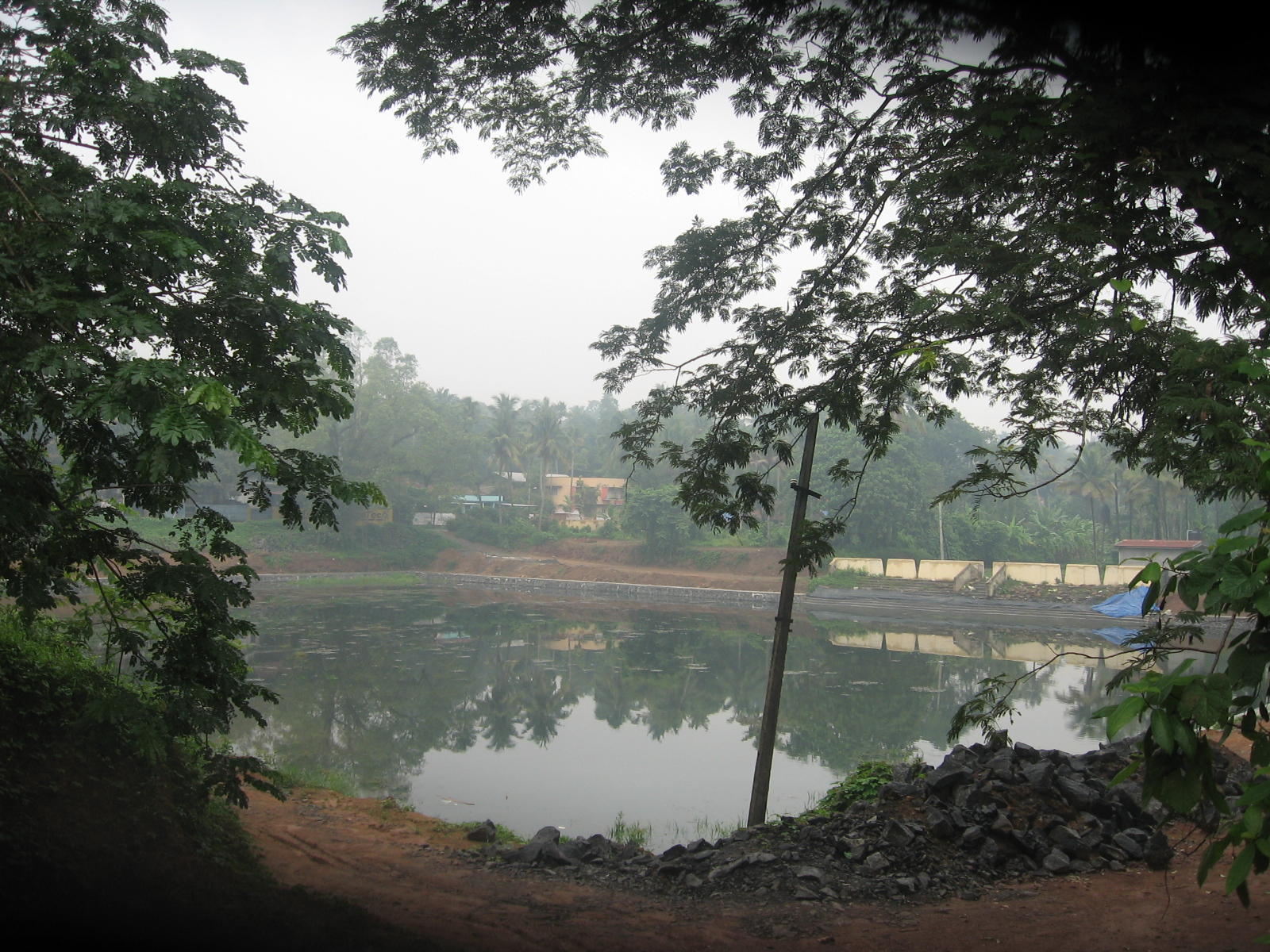
Perumbavoor Temple Pond

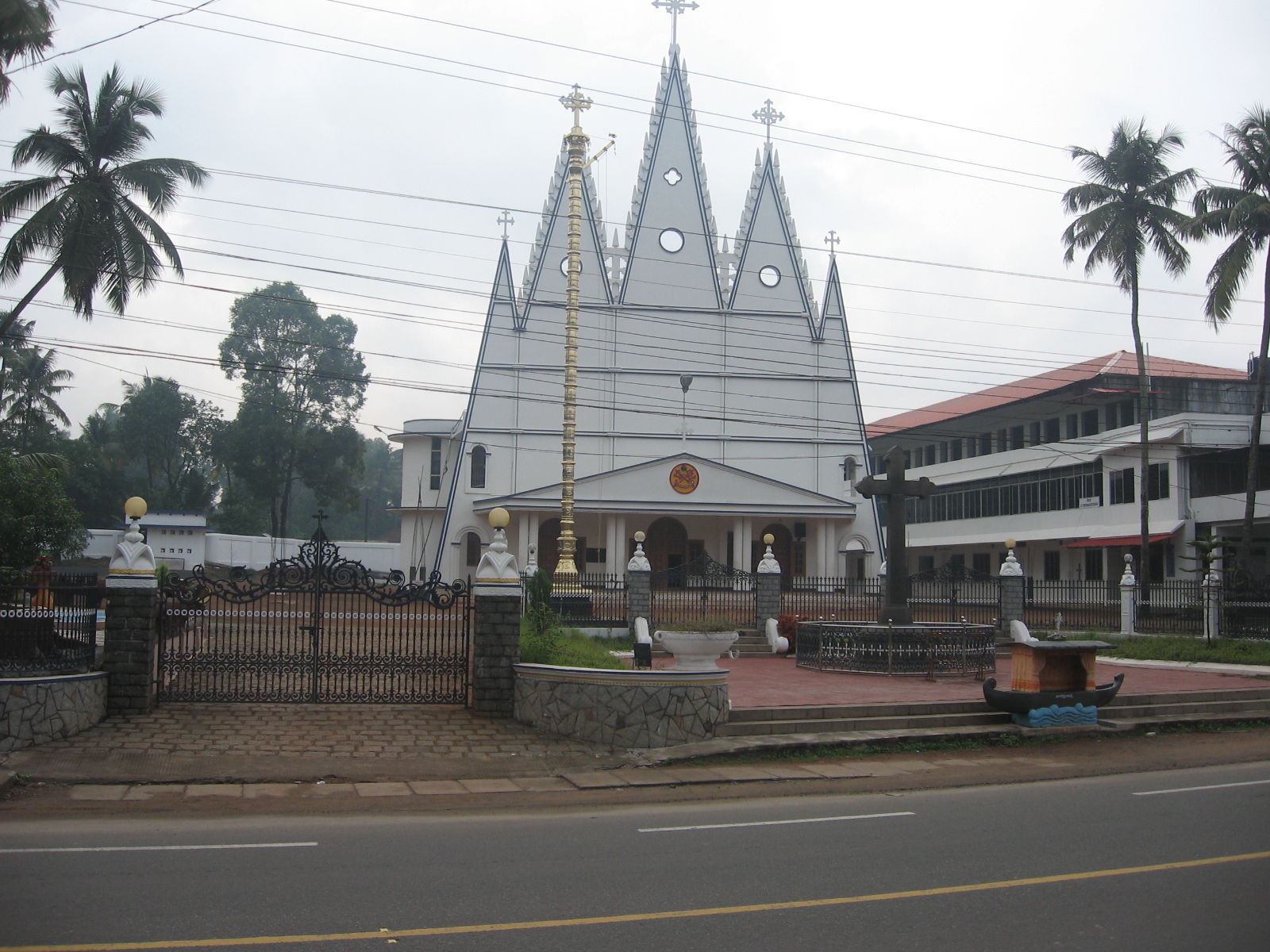
Perumbavoor Church

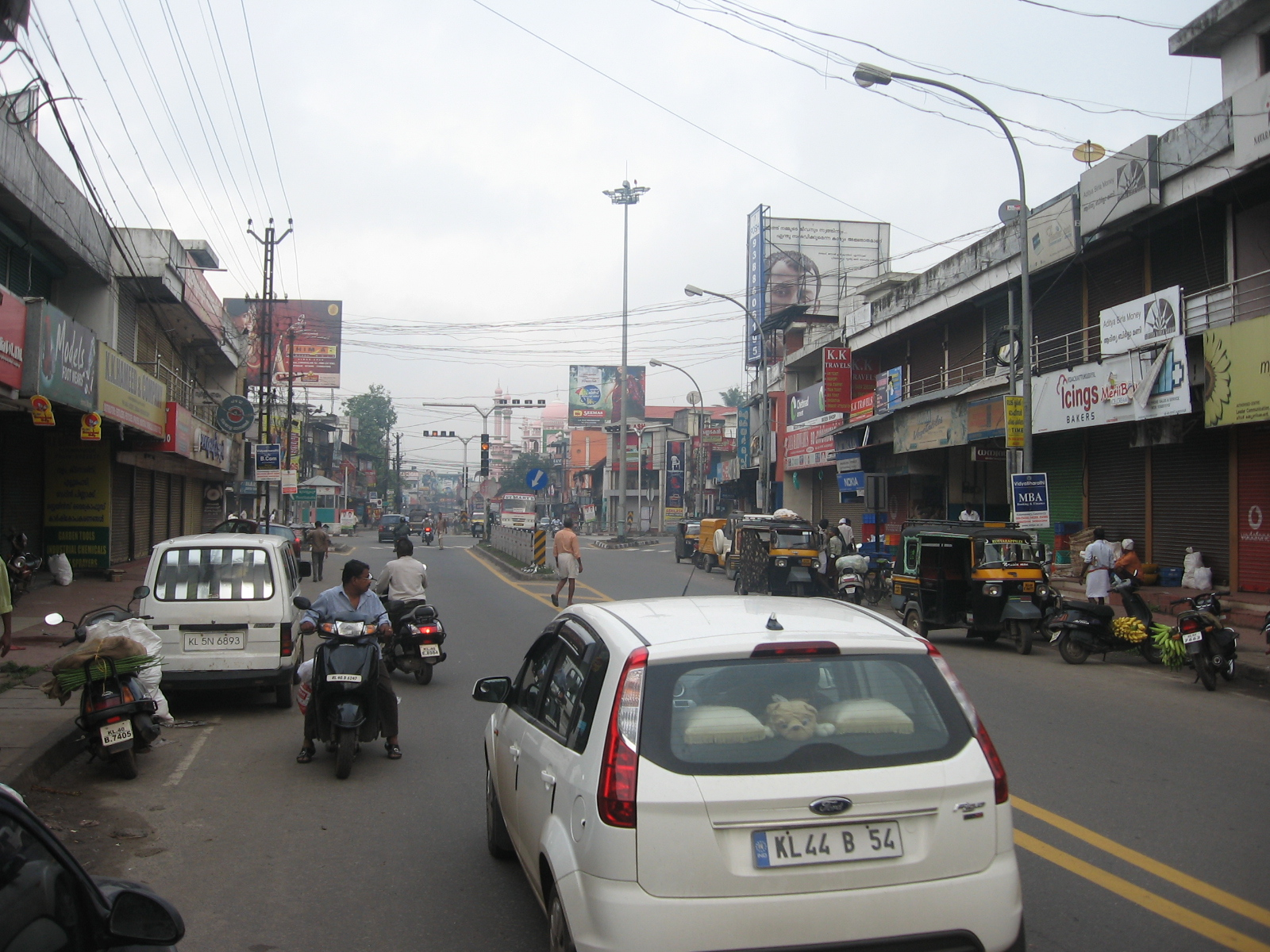
Perumbavoor Kalady Junction

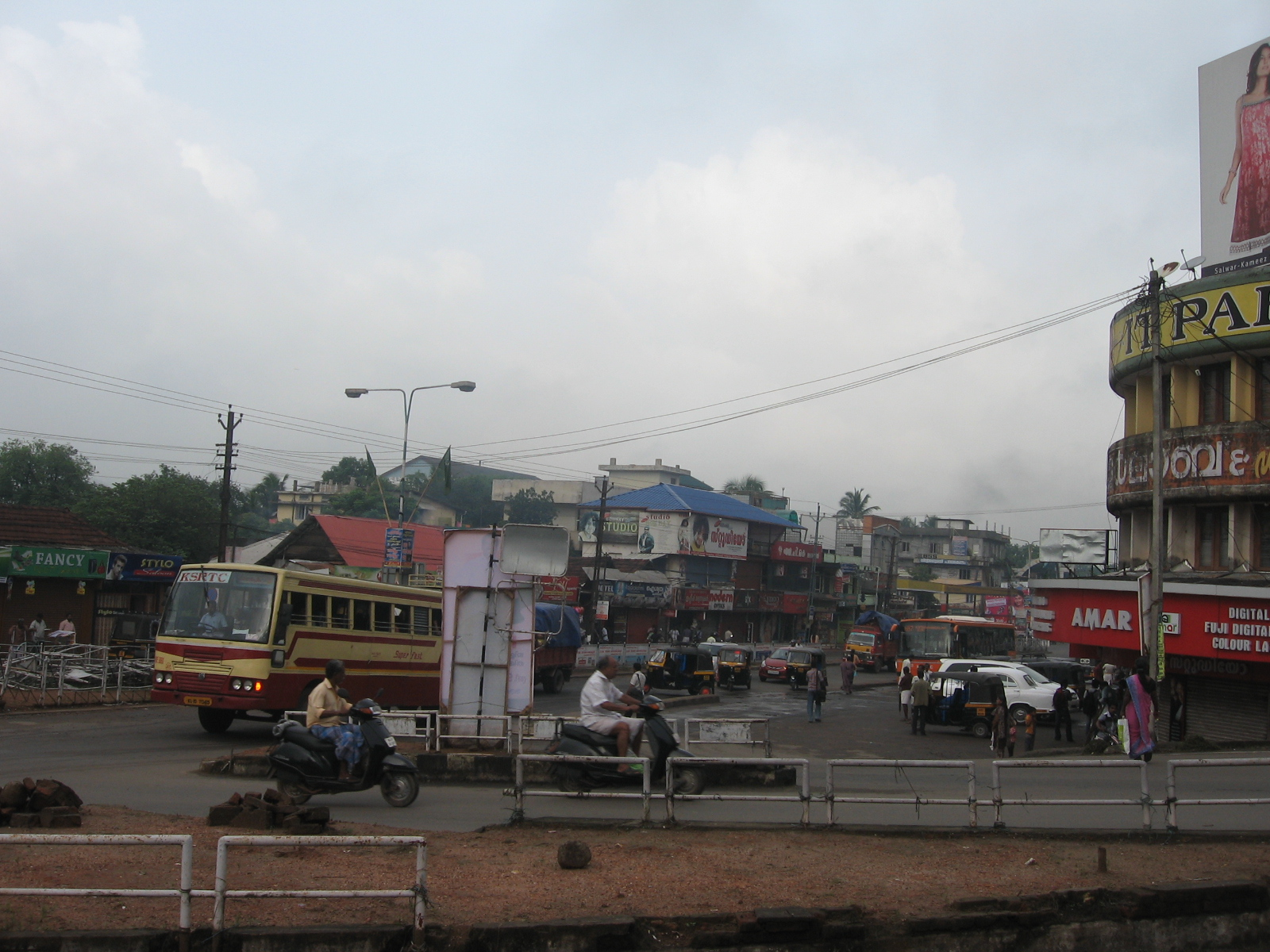
Perumbavoor Upper Bus stop

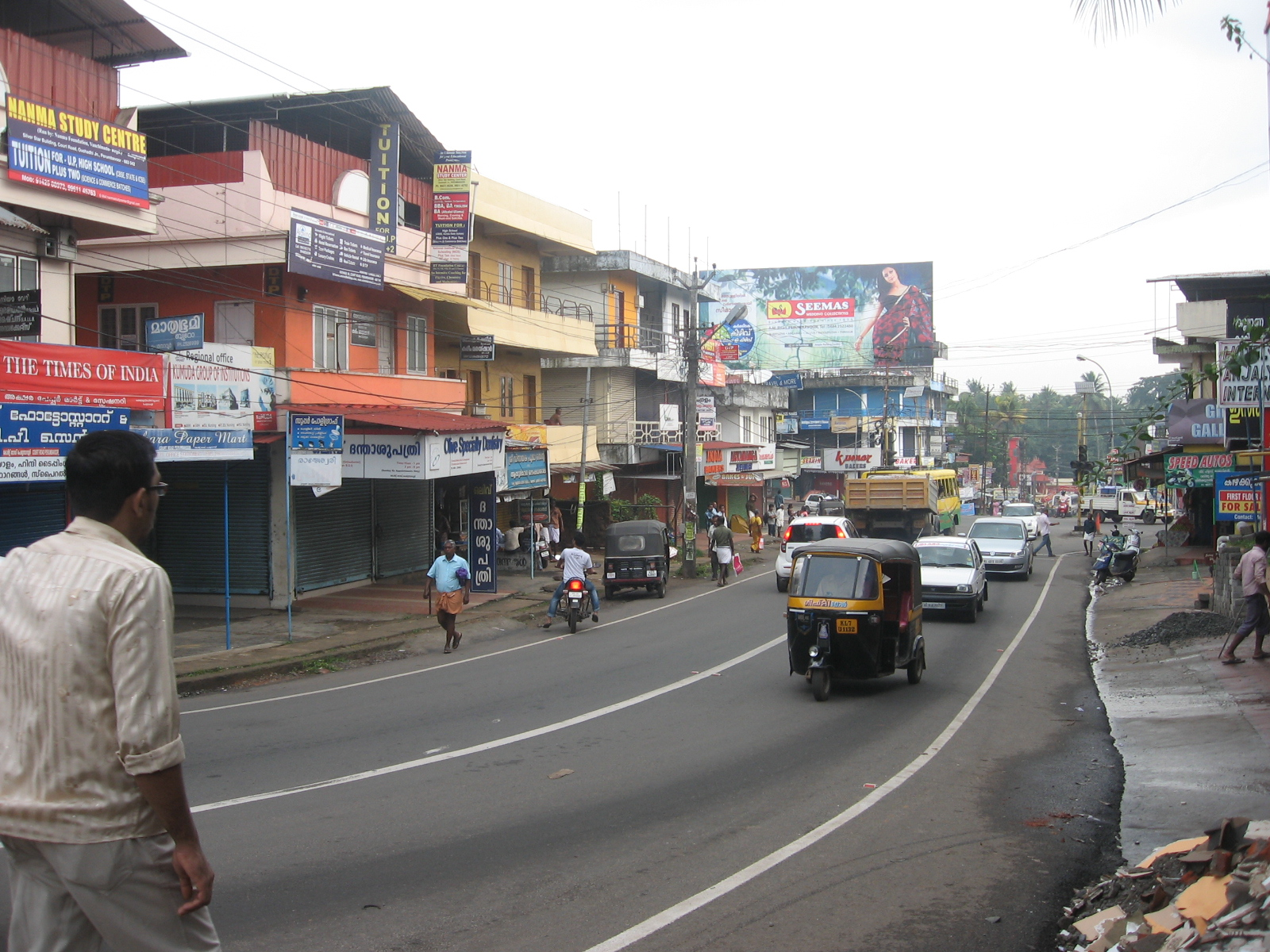
Perumbavoor Aushadi Junction

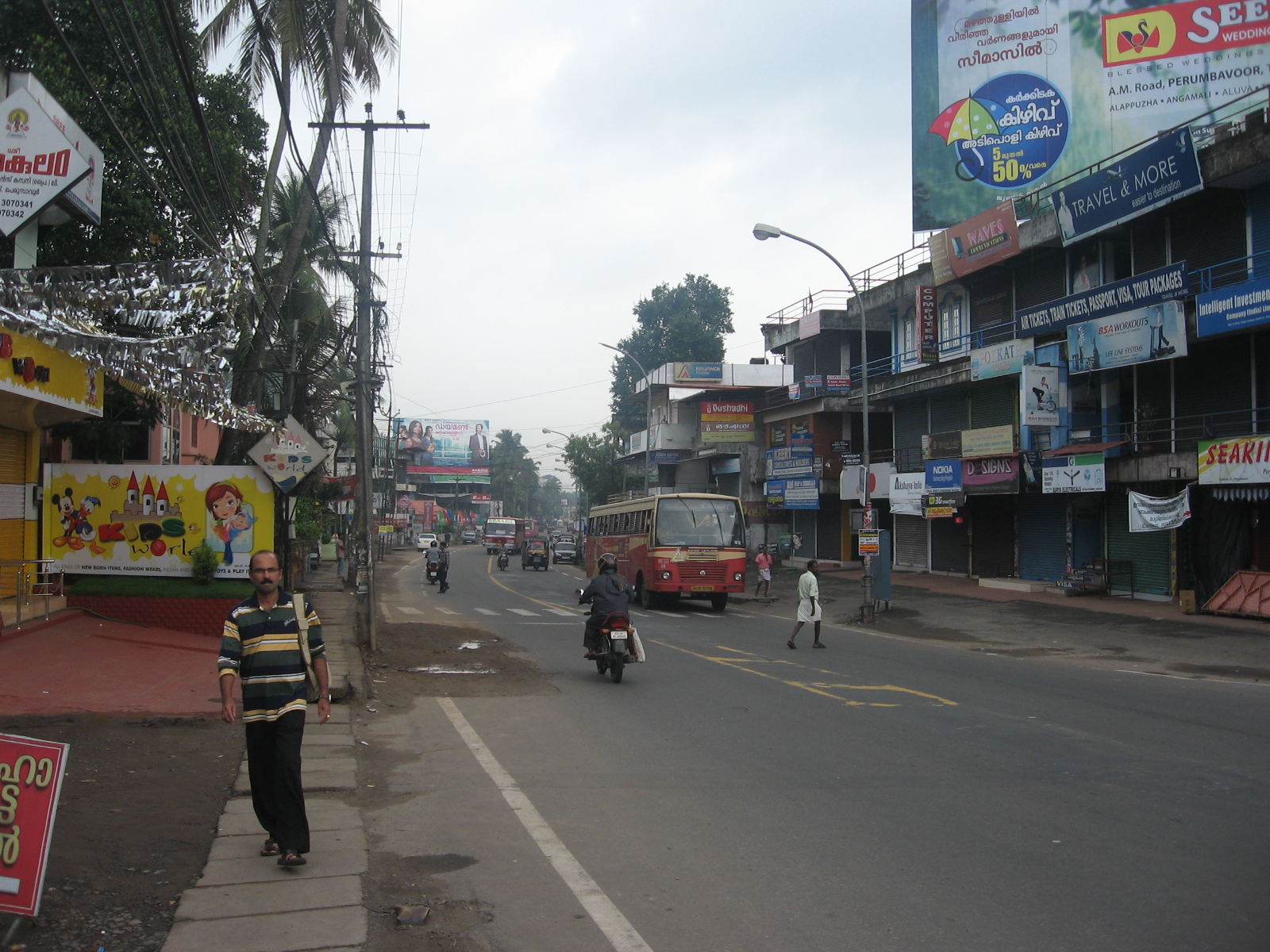
Perumbavoor Kalady Road

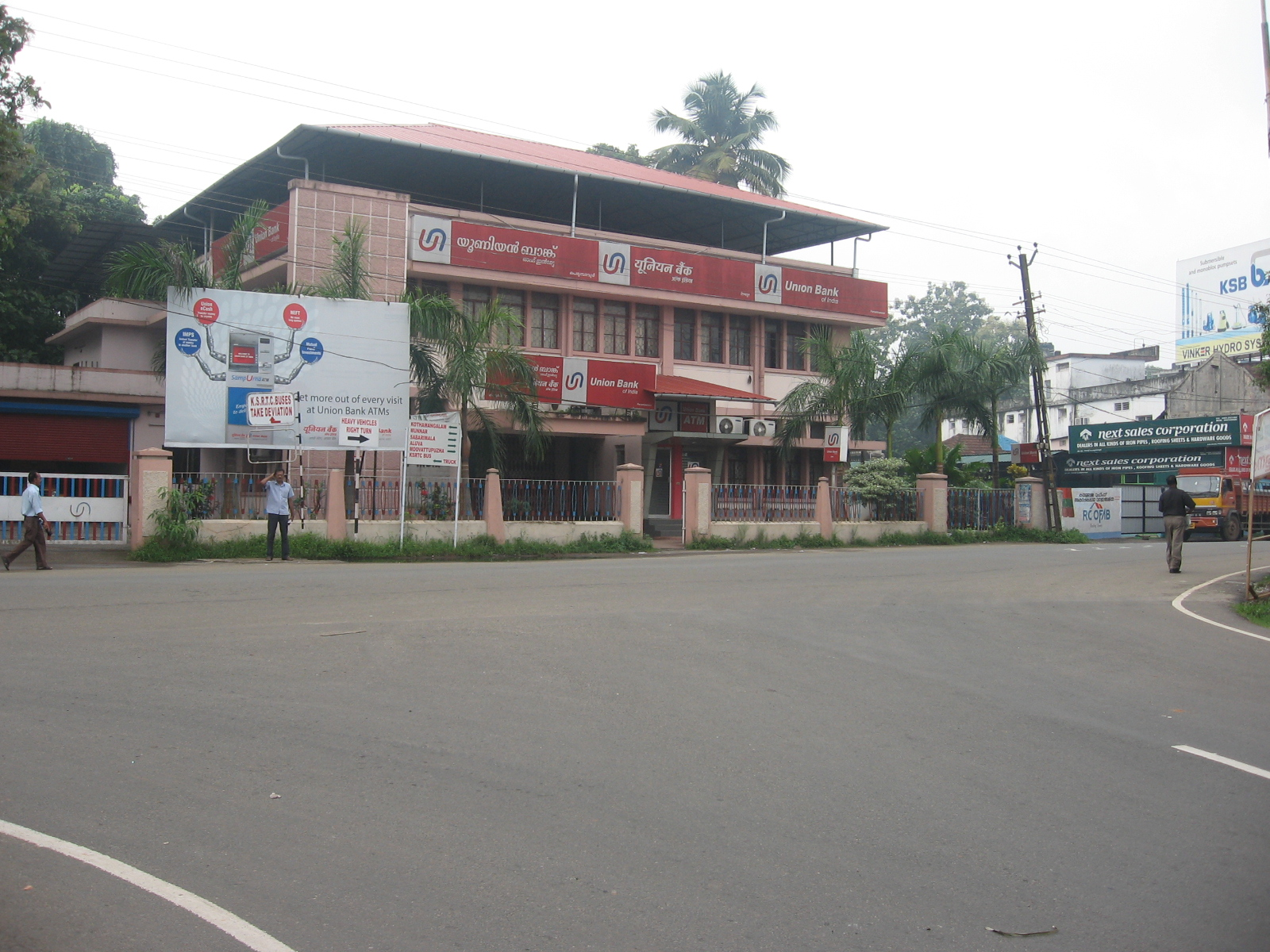
Perumbavoor GOV Hospital Junction

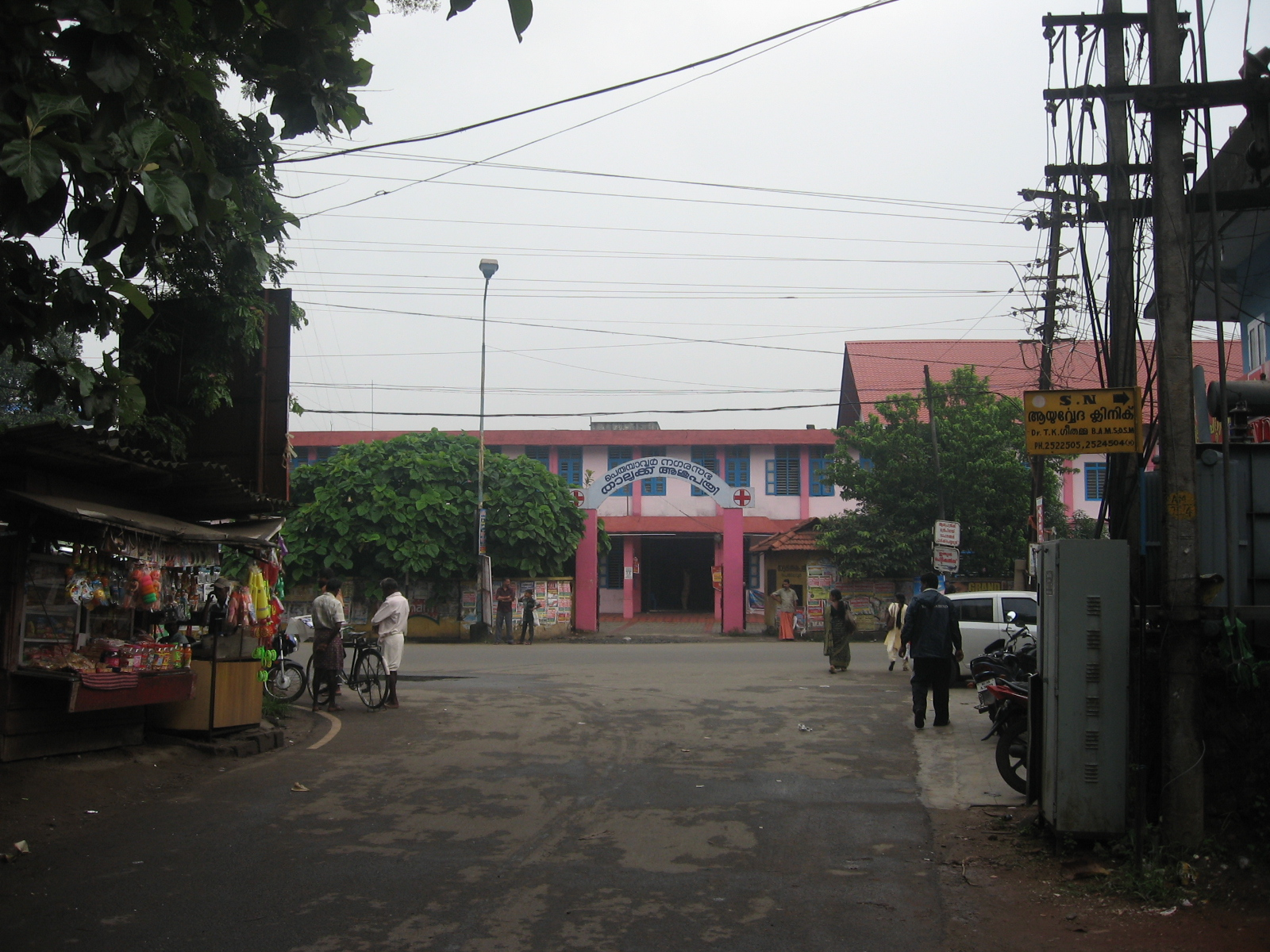
Perumbavoor GOV Hospital

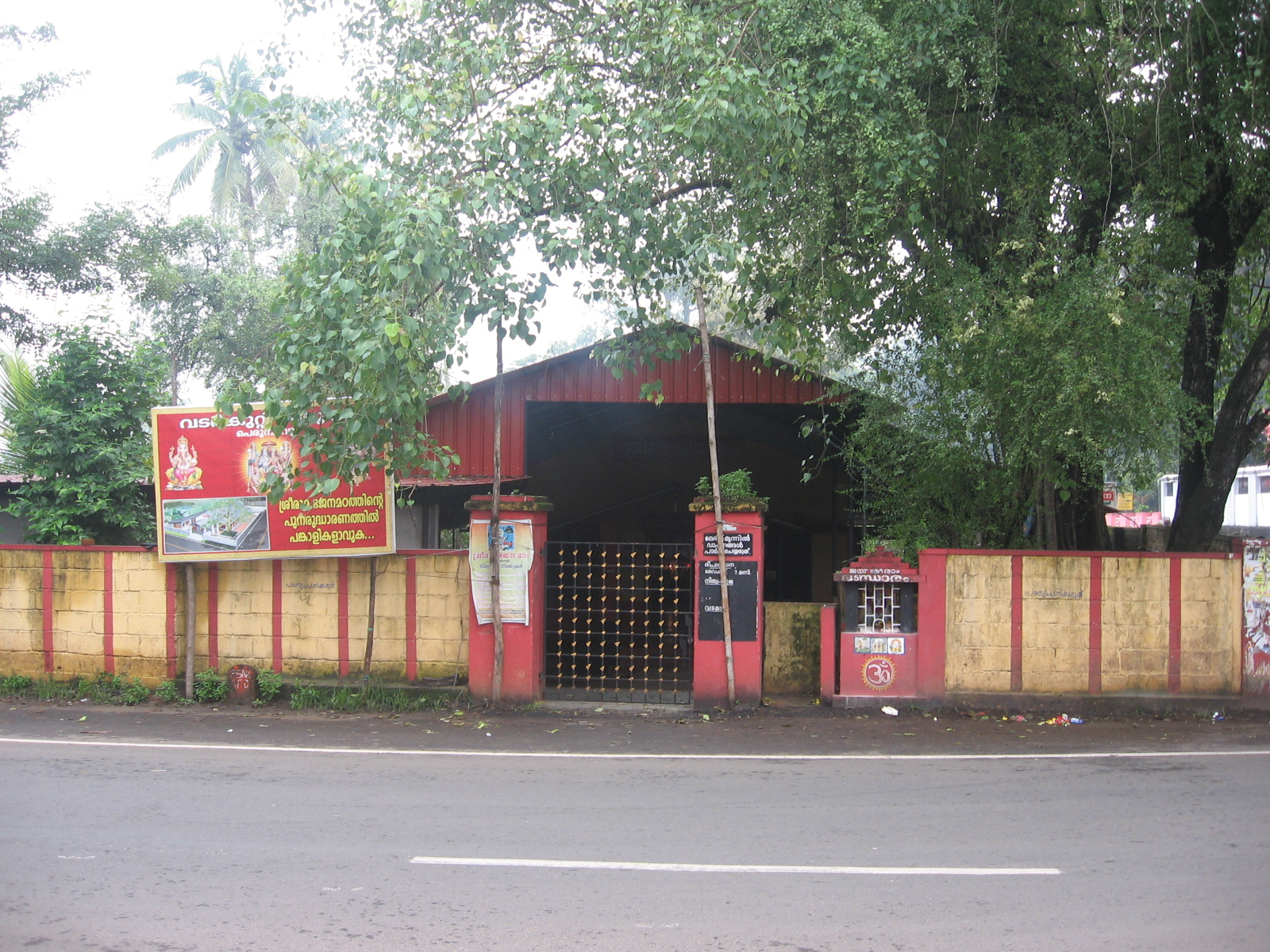
Perumbavoor Bhajana Madam

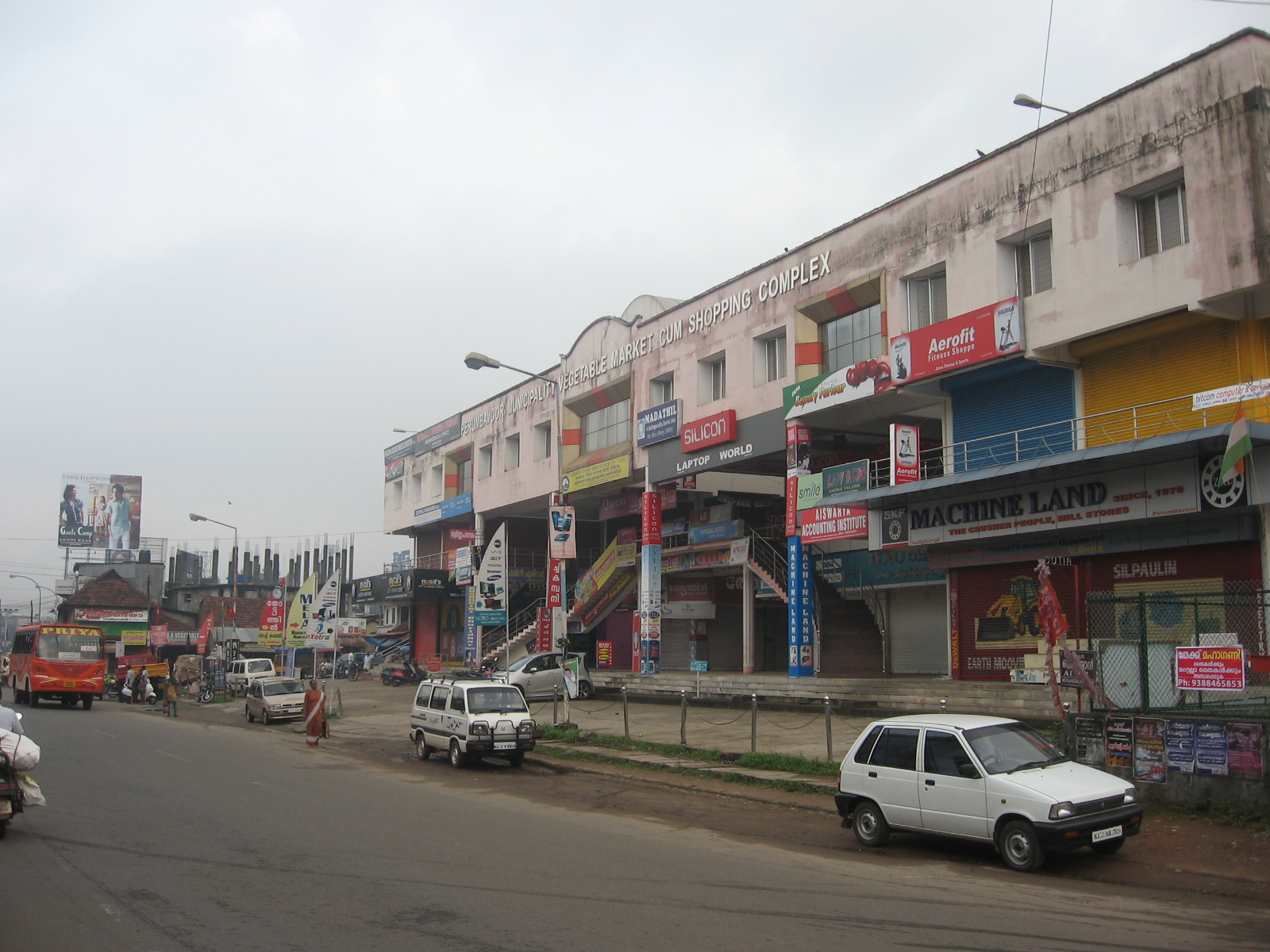
Perumbavoor Vegetable Market CUM Shopping Complex

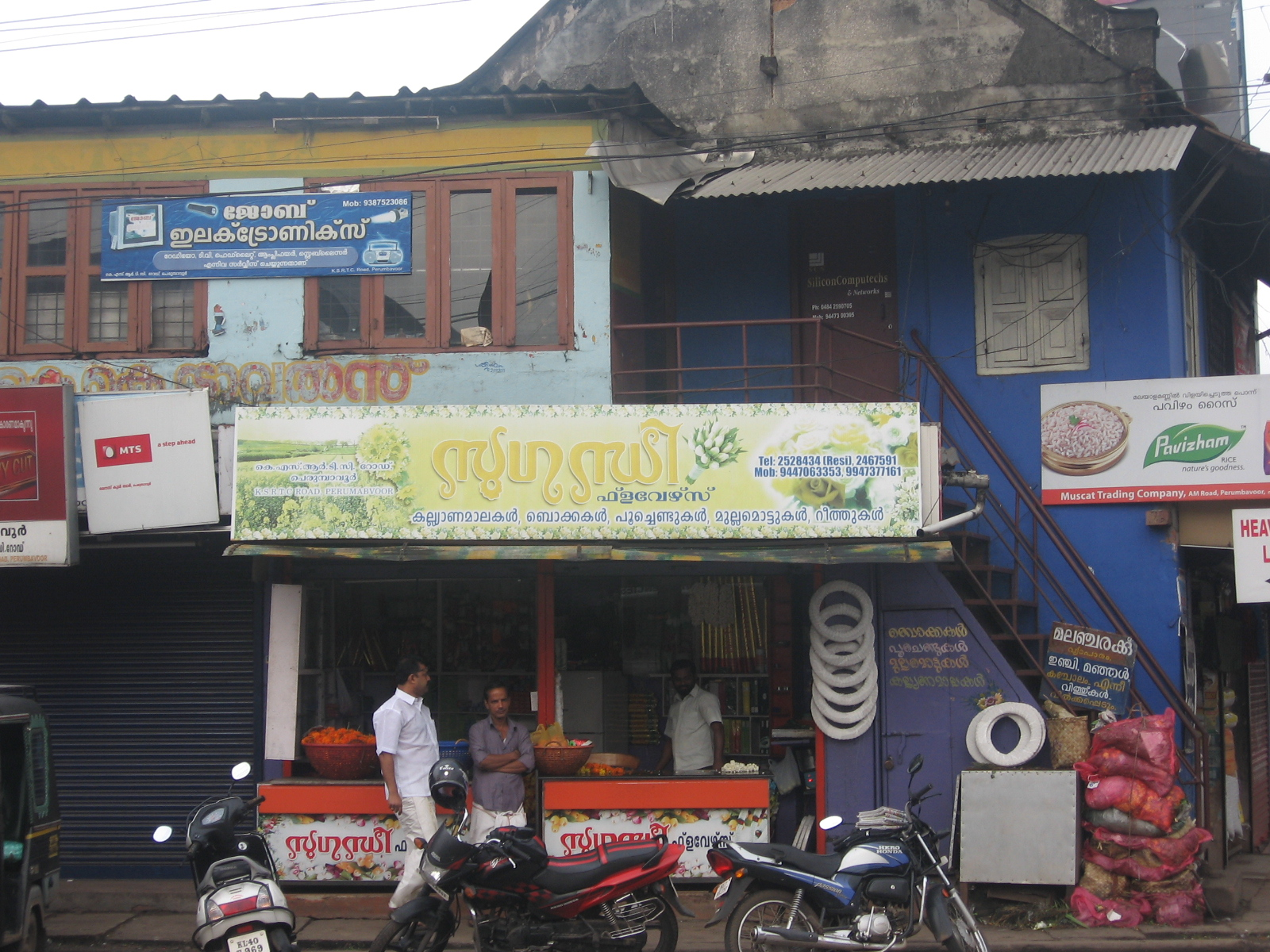
Perumbavoor Flower Shop

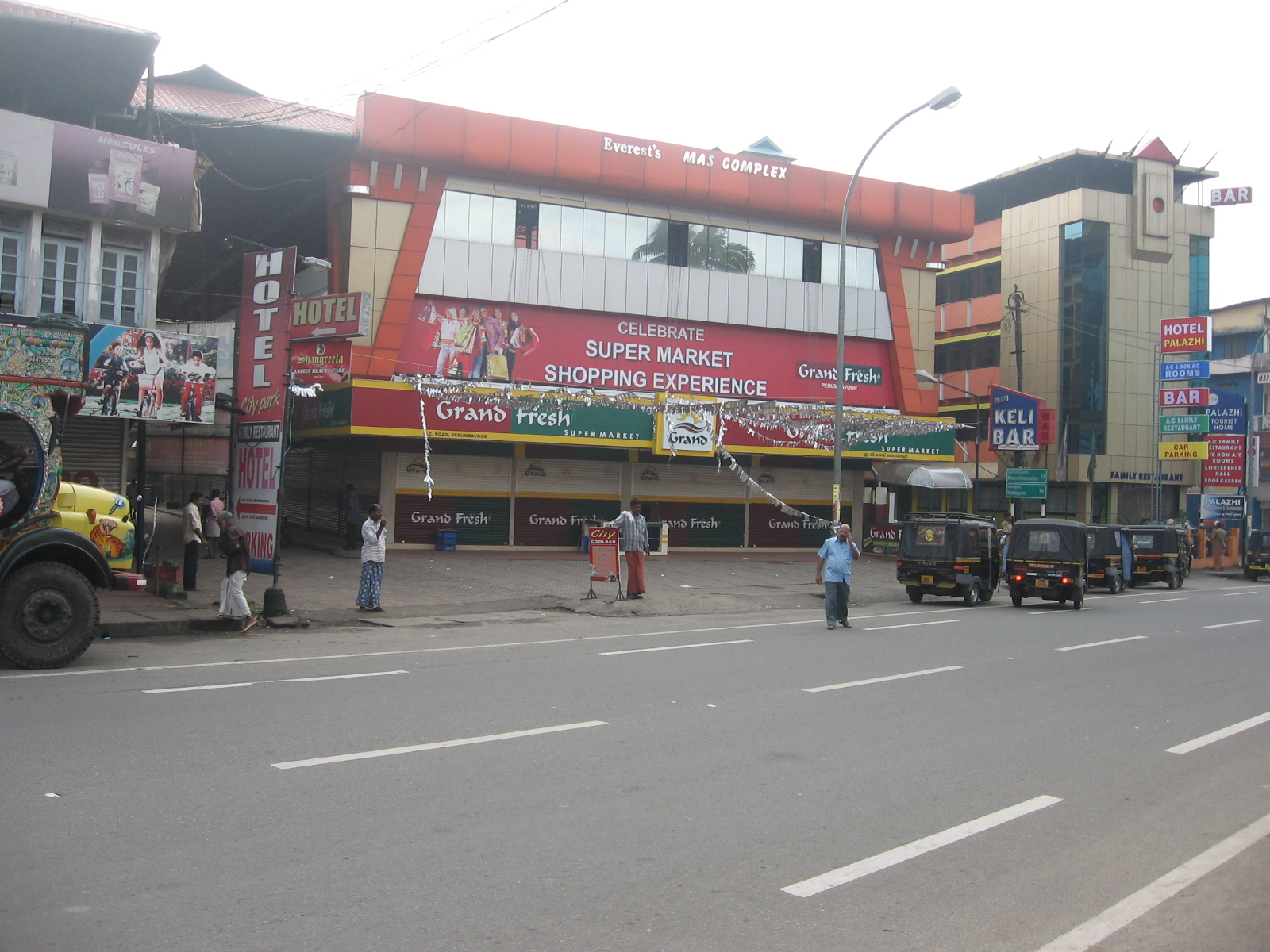
Perumbavoor Shopping Complex

Perumbavoor KSRTC Bus Station

== Notable people ==
- Sharaf U Dheen, actor
- P. P. Thankachan, politician
- D. Babu Paul, IAS
- Perumbavoor G. Raveendranath, Indian musician
- Jayaram, actor and mimicry artist
- Antony Perumbavoor, film producer
- T. H. Musthafa, politician
- M. K. Sankaran Namboothiri, classical musician
- Dinesh Prabhakar, actor
- Asha Sarath, classical dancer and actor
- Kalidas Jayaram, actor
- Mathukkutty, Indian radio jockey, television host, actor and director
- Basil Thampi, cricketer
- Mariam Vattalil, Indian social worker
- Khadeeja, Indian actress
- N. N. Pisharody, director
- Mithra Kurian, Indian actress
- Ananya, Indian actress
- Saju Paul, Indian politician
- Baselios Augen I, Indian Catholicos
- Roopesh Peethambaran, Indian film director
- Swasika, actress
- Muralee Thummarukudy, chief of disaster risk reduction in the UN

== Transportation ==
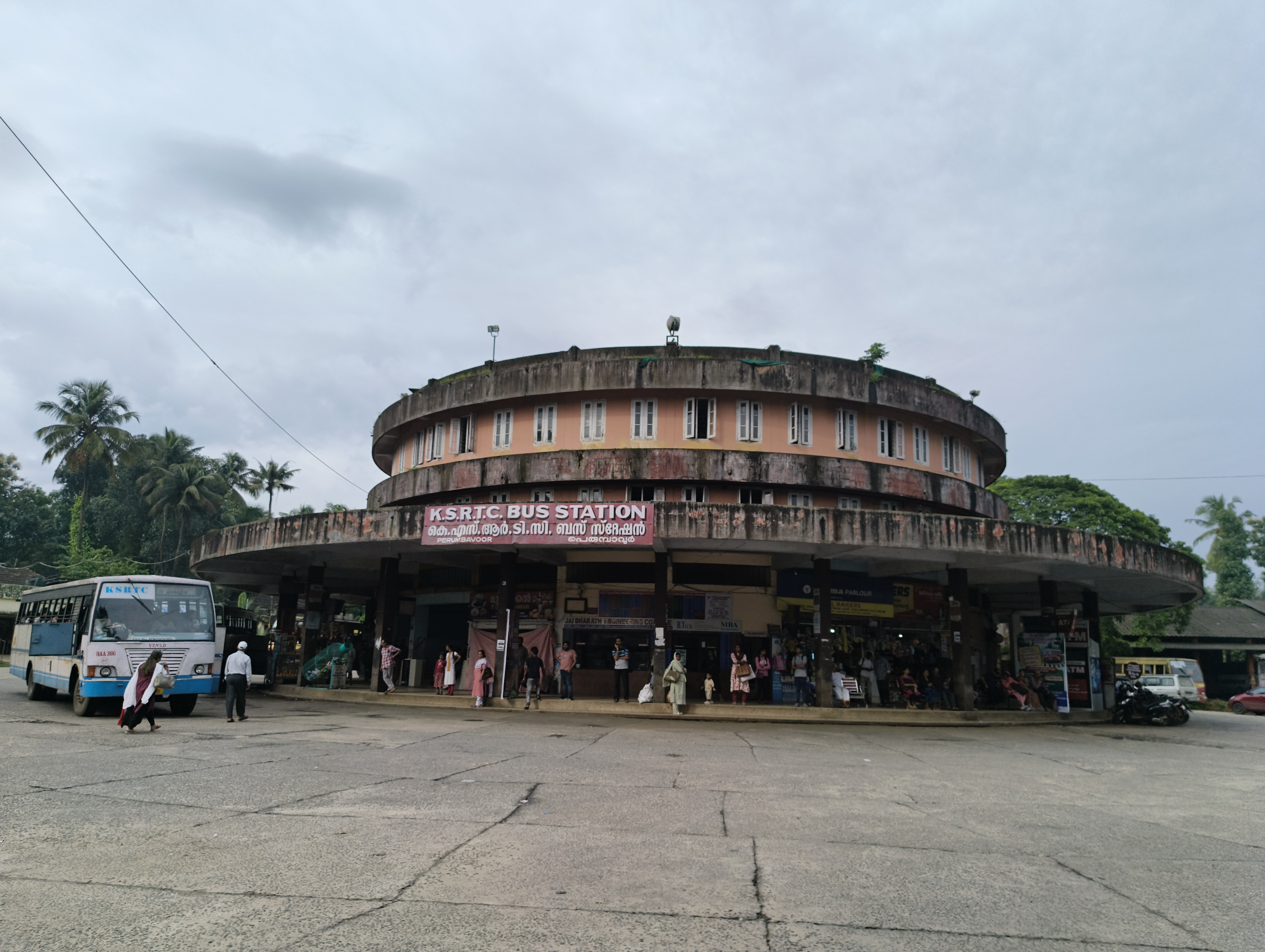
Perumbavoor KSRTC Busterminal

KL-40 is the RTO code for Kunnathunad Taluk and Perumbavoor. Perumbavoor JRTO is situated at Pattal. Perumbavoor has a KSRTC Subdepot operating several long-distance services to places inside and outside Kerala. Private bus services run to several neighbouring towns. AutoRickshaws are commonly used for small distances. There are frequent bus services to Ernakulam, Aluva, Angamaly, Kothamangalam, Muvattupuzha, Kolenchery, Thrippunithura, etc. from here. The nearest railway stations are Angamaly and Aluva. The Cochin International Airport at Nedumbassery is only 14 km from the town.

Perumbavoor is surrounded by many small but populous commuter villages, connected to the town by bus services. The notable ones are Vallam, Koovappady, Vengola, Mudickal, Thottuva, Ponjassery, Manjappetty, Kodanad, Akanad, Meempara, Chooramudy, Alattuchira, Panamkuzhy, Cheranalloor, Punnayam, Odakkaly, Panichayam, Payyal, Nedungapra, Kallil, Malayidomthuruth, Kottapady, Keezhillam, etc. Kuruppampady town is one of the main interchange points for public transport.

== Main hospitals ==
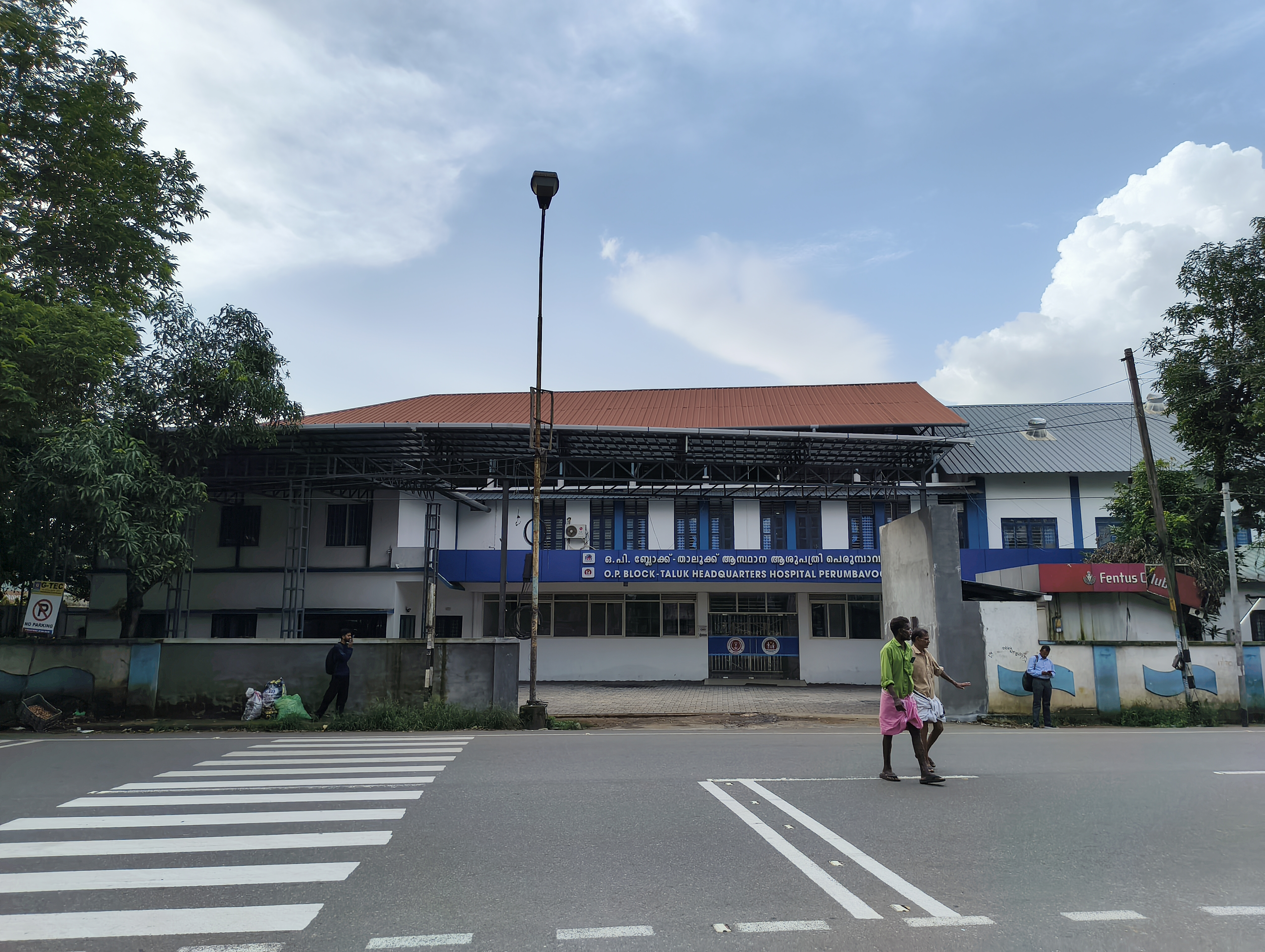
Perumbavoor Taluk Headquarters Hospital (taluk hospital in Ernakulam district, Kerala)

- Government Taluk Hospital
- Baby Memorial Hospital, Kochi, Perumbavoor (under construction)
- Perumbavoor Super Speciality Hospital (under construction)
- ESI Hospital
- Sanjoe Hospital
- Vathiyayath Hospital
- M V Joseph Memorial Hospital
- Government Ayurveda Hospital
- Parathuvayalil Hospital,
- Bharath Hospital
- Mount Senai Mission Hospital
- SN Mission Hospital,
- Luke Memorial Eye Hospital
- Government Hospital, Vengola
- Ideal Mind Care Hospital, Vengola

== Churches ==
- St. Mary's Syrian Cathedral, Kuruppampady, is one of the oldest churches in Perumbavoor
- SH Church, Aimury, Perumbavoor
- St. Paul's Marthoma Church, Perumbavoor.
- Evangelistic Association of the East, Head Office & Orphanage
- India Pentecostal Church of God, Perumbavoor Town
- Assemblies of God in India, Perumbavoor
- St. Thomas Evangelical Church of India, AM Road, Perumbavoor
- The Pentecostal Mission, Perumbavoor
- San Thome Malankara Catholic Church, MC Road, Perumbavoor Town
- Bethel Suloko Orthodox Cathedral, Perumbavoor Town
- St. Mary's Catholic Church, MC Road. Perumbavoor Town
- St. George Latin Catholic Church, MC Road. Perumbavoor
- Mar Kauma Jacobite Syriac Orthodox Church Vengoor.
- Brotheren Assembly Asramam Perumbavoor.
- Independent Baptist Church Kuruppampady.
- Mar Malke Orthodox Church, Kodanad
- St. Mary's Jacobite Syrian Church, Thurithiply
- St. Peter & Paul's Church, Mudukkari Kuruppampady
- St.Mary's Jacobite Syrian Church, Nellimolam

== Mosques ==
- South Vallam juma-masjid, Perumbavoor. It is the first mosque in Ernakulam (about 900years old)
- Town Central Juma-masjid, Perumbavoor
- Akashwani Masjid, Near Pathipalam, Perumbavoor
- Vallam Rayonpuram Juma-masjid, Perumbavoor
- Vallam Junction Juma-masjid (SH) Airport road
- Madina Masjid, Near Private bus stand, Perumbavoor
- Meca Masjid, A.M Road Perumbavoor
- Juma Masjid Mudickal (3.5 km) The second largest Masjid in Kerala
- Kandanthara Juma Masjid, Kandanthara, Perumbavoor. Kandanthara is the most populated Muslim Jamaath in the Ernakulam district
- Parappuram Juma Masjid Parappuram Vallam, Perumbavoor
- Poopani Muslim Juma Masjid Poopani Perumbavoor
- Juma Masjid Thandakkad, Perumbavoor
- Vengola Hydrose Muslim Jamaath, West Vengola
- Pallipram Padinjare Muslim Jama'ath PuthanPalli, West Mudickal

== Temples ==
- Kuzhupilli kavu, Perumbavoor
- Alppara kavu, Onnam mile, Perumbavoor
- Naklikkattu Kalari Bhadrakali Temple Allapra
- Naklikkattu Naga Paradevatha Temple Allapra
- Valakara Temple, Allapra
- Pisharikkal Bhagavathy temple, Aimury, Perumbavoor
- Punnayam mahadeva temple, punnayam
- Iringol kavu, which is the largest Kavu in Kerala
- Koottumadom Sree Subramanya Swami Temple, Rayamangalam
- Perumbavoor Sri Dharmasastha Temple
- Kallil Temple, Kallil Bhagavathi Cave Temple, Methala
- Thottuva Dhanwanthari temple (8 km from Perumbavoor)
- Chelattu Kavu Mookambika & Bhadhrakali Temple, Aimury
- Cheruvallykkavu-Padickal Puthen Veedu, Aimury
- Devi Temple, Vengoor
- Chelamattom Shree Krishna Swami Temple
- Aananthanath Bhagavath Temple, Mudakkuzha
- Vaniappilly Pancheswaravishnu Temple, Chundakkuzhi
- Keezhillam Perumthrikovil Mahadeva Kshetram

== How to reach ==
Perumbavoor lies in the north-eastern corner of the Kochi urban area. The geographic advantages of Perumbavoor are that NH 544 lies closer to this town apart from Main Central Road and the Aluva-Munnar highway passing through this place. Perumbavoor is surrounded by important towns like Aluva, Muvattupuzha, Kothamangalam, Angamaly, etc., in close distances. Important suburban regions of Kochi, like Aluva, Kalamassery, Kakkanad, and Thrippunithura, are all in proximity to Perumbavoor.

- Kochi - Edapally - Pookkattupady - Chembarakky (34 km)
- Thodupuzha - Vazhakkulam - Muvattupuzha -Keezhillam (40 km)
- Thrissur - Chalakudy - Angamaly (59 km)
- Kottayam - Ettumanoor - Koothattukulam - Muvattupuzha (76 km)
- Alappuzha - Cherthala - Kundannoor - Petta - Pallikkara - Kizhakkambalam (85 km)
- Munnar - Pallivasal - Adimali - Kothamangalam (98 km)
- Thiruvananthapuram - Kottarakkara - Pandalam - Changanassery - Kottayam -Muvattupuzha (228 km)

== See also ==
- Kochi
- Piravom
- Kothamangalam
- Aluva
- Muvattupuzha
