= Vengoor =

- village
- Location in Kerala, India Vengoor (India)
- Coordinates: 10.1413448°N 76.5495397°E
- Country: India
- State: Kerala
- District: Ernakulam
- Kunnathunadu: Aluva
- Elevation: 66 m (217 ft)

Population (2011)
  - Total: 10,961
- Time zone: UTC+5:30 (IST)
- Postal code: 683546
- 2011 census code: Vengoor
- Kuruppampady. Perumbavoor: Perumbavoor. Vengoor

Vengoor is a village in the Ernakulam district of Kerala, India.

Vengoor stretches from double palam which is not double anymore to the culvert near shapumpadi bus stop. Vengoor has 2 schools, a church, one temple and two convents. Vengoor belongs to Angamaly municipality and it determines one of the boundary lines of the same.

== Demographics ==
According to the 2011 census of India, Vengoor has 2797 households. The literacy rate of the village is 86.88%.

Demographics (2011 Census)
	Total	Male	Female
Population	10961	5332	5629
Children aged below 6 years	945	453	492
Scheduled caste	1053	495	558
Scheduled tribe	31	12	19
Literates	9523	4725	4798
Workers (all)	4909	3243	1666
Main workers (total)	3765	2651	1114
Main workers: Cultivators	578	457	121
Main workers: Agricultural labourers	793	472	321
Main workers: Household industry workers	44	32	12
Main workers: Other	2350	1690	660
Marginal workers (total)	1144	592	552
Marginal workers: Cultivators	127	91	36
Marginal workers: Agricultural labourers	504	226	278
Marginal workers: Household industry workers	19	8	11
Marginal workers: Others	494	267	227
Non-workers	6052	2089	3963
