= Rayamangalam =

Rayamangalam may refer to:

- Rayamangalam, Kerala
- Rayamangalam, Tamil Nadu
