= St. John's Church, Thiruvaniyoor =

St. John's Orthodox Syrian Church
- St. John's Orthodox Syrian Church
- Kanniattunirappu Palli
- Location in Kerala
- 9.933418°N 76.410303°E
- Location: Chottanikkara Vandippetta Road, Thiruvaniyoor, Kerala 682308
- Country: India
- Denomination: Malankara Orthodox Syrian Church

History
- Founded: 20 May 1872

St. John's Orthodox Syrian Church, also known as Kanniattunirappu Palli, is a church part of the Kandanad West Diocese of Malankara Orthodox Syrian Church. The church is located beside the Chottanikkara Vandippetta Road within the village of Thiruvaniyoor, in the Indian state of Kerala.
