= J. H. A. Tremenheere =

English civil servant and cricketer

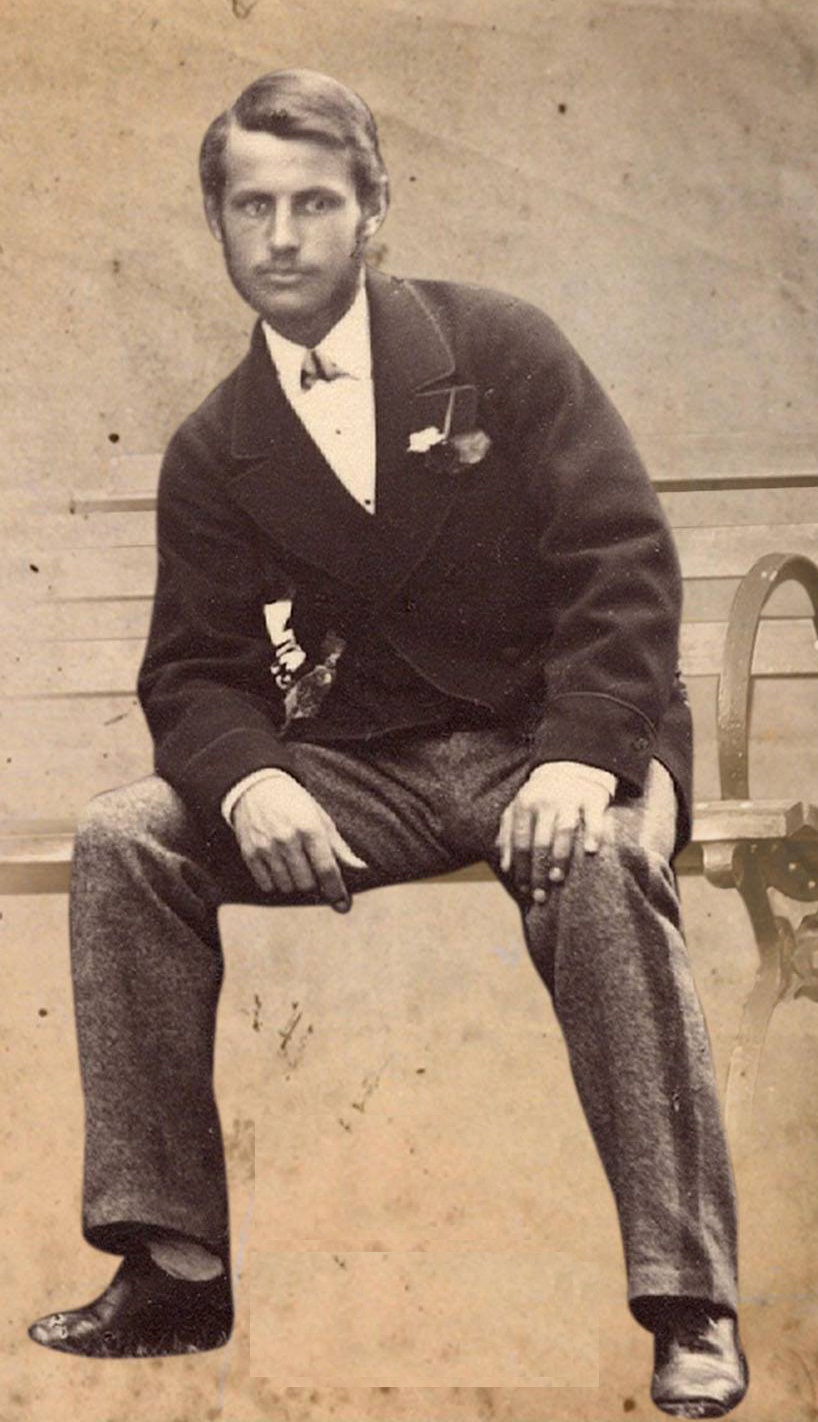
- Born: October 30, 1853; Poona, British India
- Died: October 28, 1912 (aged 58); Inglismaldie Castle, Scotland
- Occupations: Civil servant; cricketer
- Spouse: Jessie Retallack van Auken

James Henry Apperley Tremenheere (30 October 1853 – 28 October 1912) was an English civil servant and cricketer. His report recommended that the British government should allot lands for the Scheduled Castes to overcome the social discrimination they faced. These lands were later identified as Depressed Class condition lands (Panchami Land).

== Early life ==
He was the son of military officer Charles William Tremenheere, who worked in the Public Works Department, and Cammilla Elizabeth Grieg. He was born in Poona, and educated in England at Lancing College, where he played cricket for the school, and Cheltenham College.

== Civil service ==
He passed the entry examination for the Indian Civil Service in 1873, and completed his training in 1875. He arrived in India in November 1875, and worked first in Madras. He was moved to Mysore in 1883, but was later returned to Madras.

In 1891 Tremenheere was Collector for Chingleput, and reported on the depressed castes, at a time of local famine. He described the poor condition of a group of Paraiyars at Senneri. He suggested improving their position with respect to land ownership. He took into account the report of his predecessor, Lee Warner, and attributed the social problem he met to the mirasi system. The report's conclusions, however, were resisted by the Board of Revenue. Tremenheere became Collector and magistrate at Kistna in 1894. He was appointed Collector for the Niligris in 1896.

Tremenheere retired in 1901.

== Cricket ==
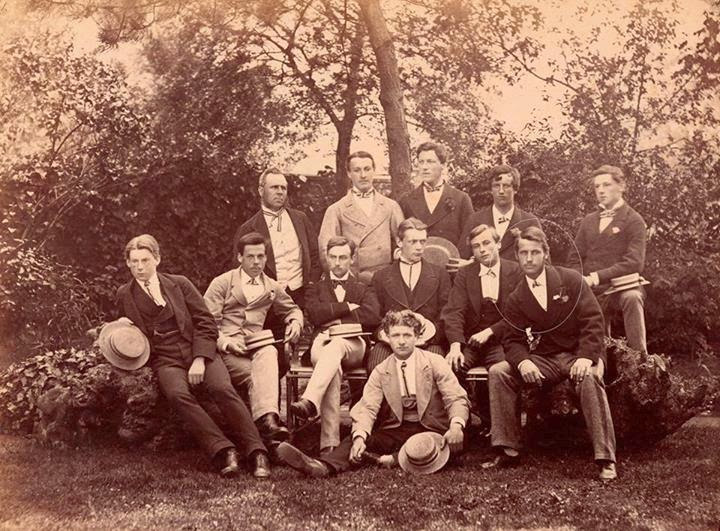
J.H.A. Tremenheere with his teammates in Gloucestershire County Cricket Club in 1872

J.H.A. Tremenheere was a right-handed batsman and a right-arm round-arm medium pace bowler who played for Gloucestershire. He made a single first-class appearance, during the 1872 season, aged just 18, against Surrey. From the lower order, he scored 7 runs in the only innings in which he batted, as his team secured a win by an innings margin.

== Works ==
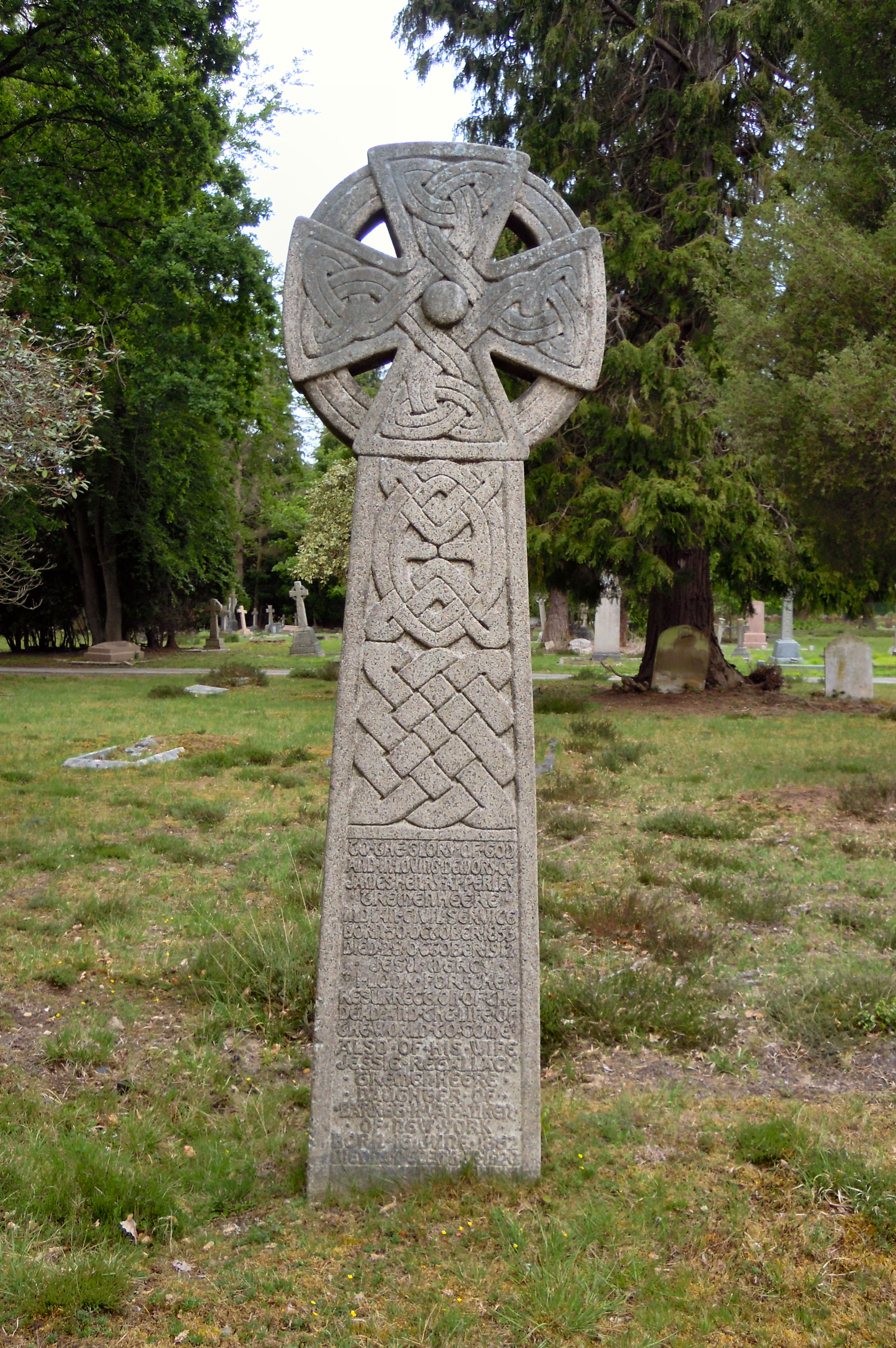
Tremenheere's grave in Brookwood Cemetery in 2019

- The Lesbia of Catullus (1897), translator

== Personal life ==
Tremenheere married Jessie Retallack van Anken, an American woman, on October 18, 1887 in New York.

He died in Scotland, at Inglismaldie Castle in Edzell and was buried in Brookwood Cemetery in Surrey.

== Legacy ==
In India, the J.H.A. Tremenheere Foundation is a trust run by dalit activists, who observe his birth anniversary annually as a token of gratitude for his service for the empowerment of dalits.
