= Thiruvaniyoor =

- village
- Location in Kerala, India Thiruvaniyoor (India)
- Coordinates: 9.944919°N 76.4164722°E
- Country: India
- State: Kerala
- District: Ernakulam
- Taluk: Kunnathunad
- Elevation: 18 m (59 ft)

Population (2011)
  - Total: 25,327
- Time zone: UTC+5:30 (IST)
- 2011 census code: 627955

Thiruvaniyoor is an eastern suburb of the city of Kochi in the state of Kerala, India. Situated around 15 km (9 mi) south-east from the city centre, it is a part of Kunnathunad taluk.

== History ==
During the starting years of 19th century, almost 90% of the land was under the control of Devaswom or landlords. The major devaswom and landlords at that time were Thiruvaniyoor Devaswom, Chemmanad Devaswom, Monappilly Devaswom, Muriyamangalam Devaswom, Purapperi Mana, Kizhakumbhagath Mana, Thuruthikkala Mana, Mathurakkattu Mana, etc.

== Kunnathnadu Tehsil ==
This village is part of Kunnathnadu taluk of Ernakulam district. Other towns in this area include Kizhakkambalam, Kombanad, Mazhuvannoor, Rayamangalam and Thiruvaniyoor.

== Demographics ==
According to the 2011 census of India, Thiruvaniyoor has 6413 households. The literacy rate of the village is 87.78%.

Demographics (2011 Census)
	Total	Male	Female
Population	25327	12438	12889
Children aged below 6 years	2133	1079	1054
Scheduled caste	3035	1475	1560
Scheduled tribe	54	30	24
Literates	22233	11095	11138
Workers (all)	10356	7151	3205
Main workers (total)	8929	6420	2509
Main workers: Cultivators	641	497	144
Main workers: Agricultural labourers	657	453	204
Main workers: Household industry workers	151	123	28
Main workers: Other	7480	5347	2133
Marginal workers (total)	1427	731	696
Marginal workers: Cultivators	142	99	43
Marginal workers: Agricultural labourers	192	88	104
Marginal workers: Household industry workers	31	13	18
Marginal workers: Others	1062	531	531
Non-workers	14971	5287	9684
