= Pancham =

Pancham may refer to:

- Pancham da, nickname of Rahul Dev Burman, an Indian film score composer
- Pancham (svara), fifth of the seven basic swaras (notes) of the musical scale of Indian classical music (Hindustani music and Carnatic music)
- Pancham (TV series), an Indian TV series
- Pancham (Pokémon), a Pokémon species

== See also ==
- Panchami, fifth day of the lunar fortnight in the Hindu calendar
- Panchami (film), 1976 Indian film
- Panchami Land, type of land title in India
- Panchama Veda or Fifth Veda, Hindu texts sometimes referred to as a Veda, which lie outside the four canonical Vedas
- Panchama Veda (film), 1990 Indian film
