= Iringole Kavu =

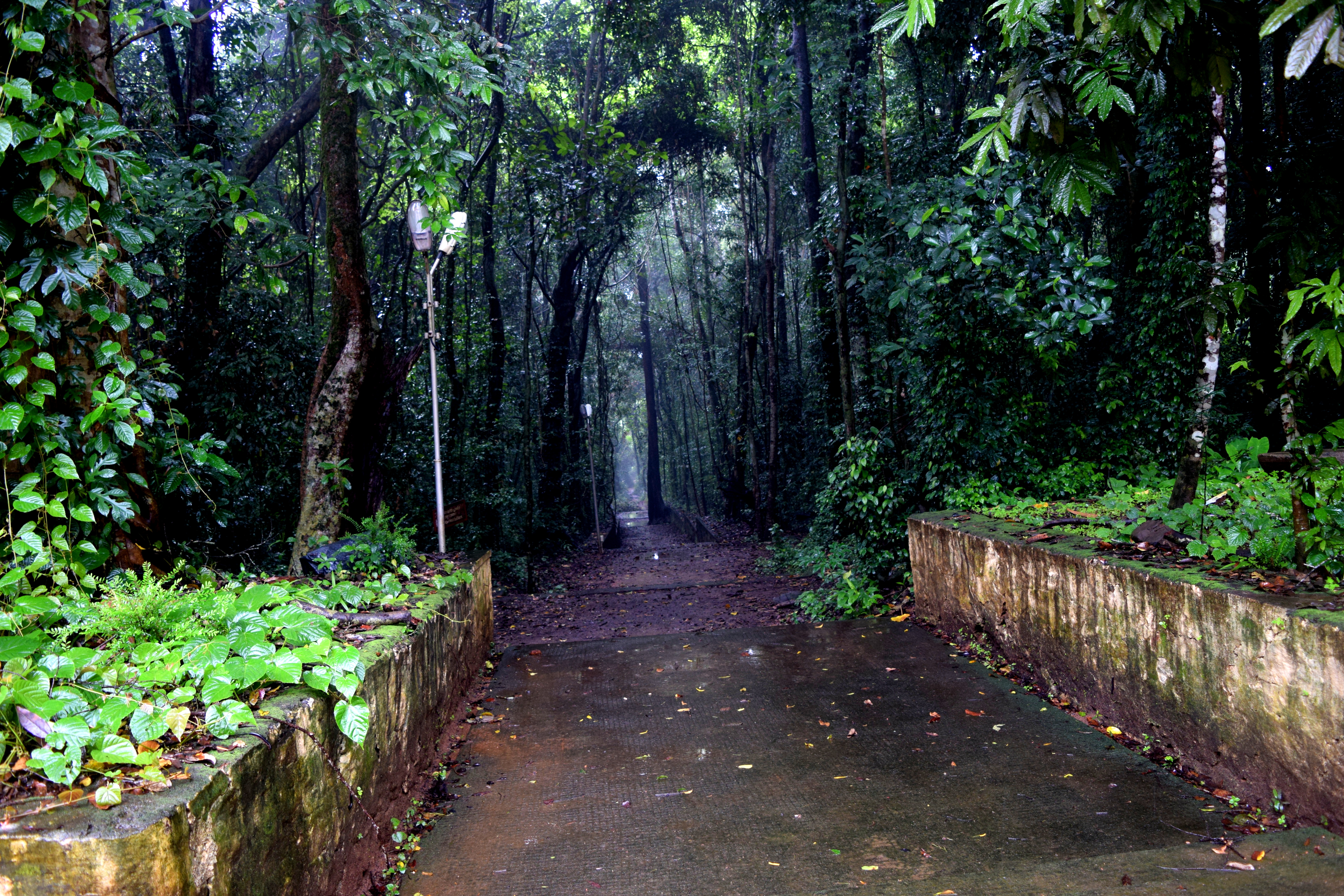
- Interior

- Iringole Bhagavathy Temple, Rayamangalam, Ernakulam, Kerala

Religion
- Affiliation: Hinduism
- District: Ernakulam district
- Deity: Saraswati, Durga, Bhadrakali

Location
- Location: Rayamangalam
- State: Kerala
- Country: India
- Coordinates: 10°06′31″N 76°30′02″E

Specifications
- Temple: One
- Elevation: 64.17 m (211 ft)

Website
- https://www.iringolekavu.com/

Iringole Kavu is a forest temple dedicated to Durga, situated in Kunnathunad Taluk of Ernakulam district, 2.5 km from Perumbavoor. This is one of the 108 Durga Temples in Kerala believed to have been consecrated by Parasurama, the sixth avatar of Vishnu.

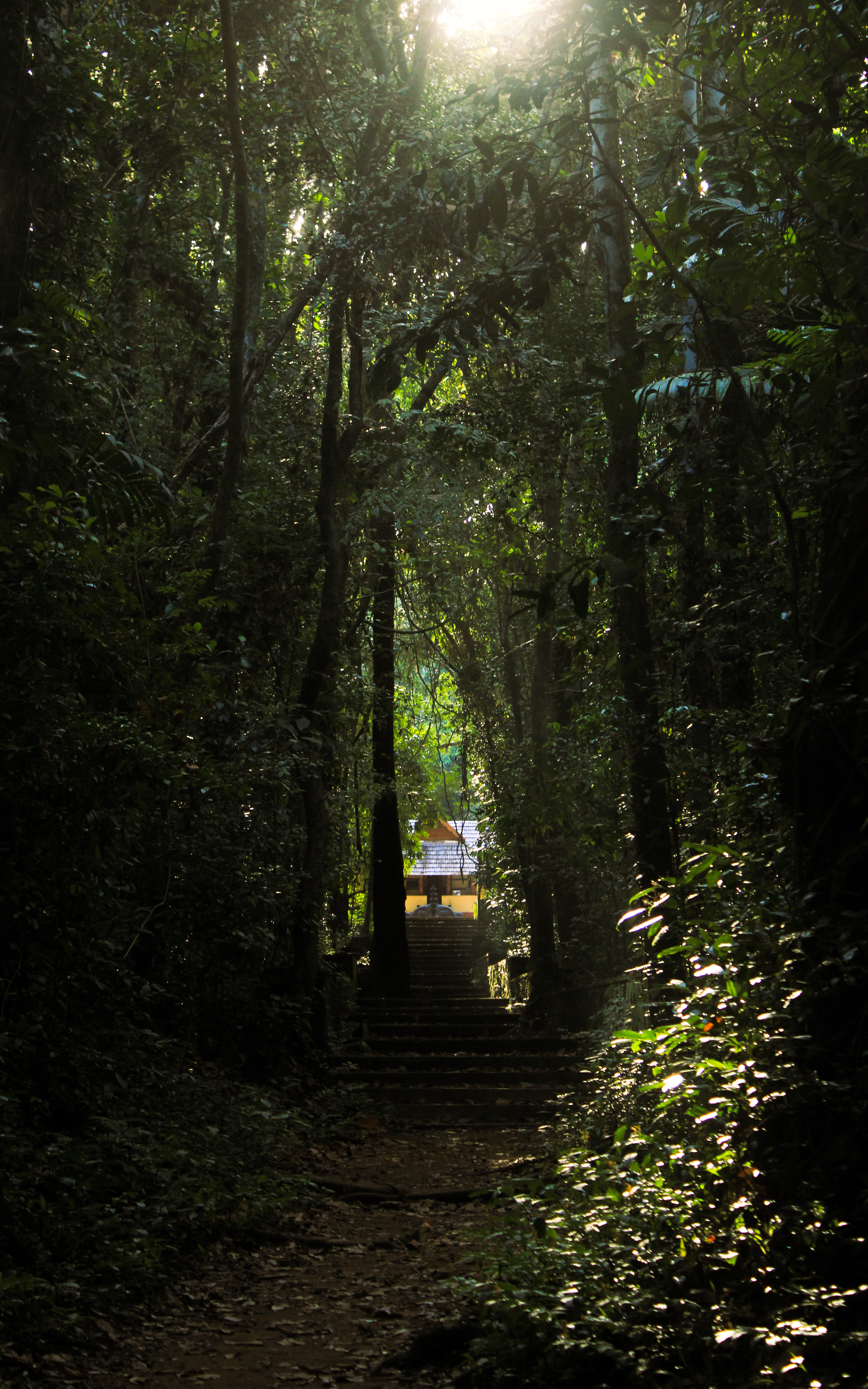
Iringole Kavu

== Gallery ==
=== Iringol Kavu ===
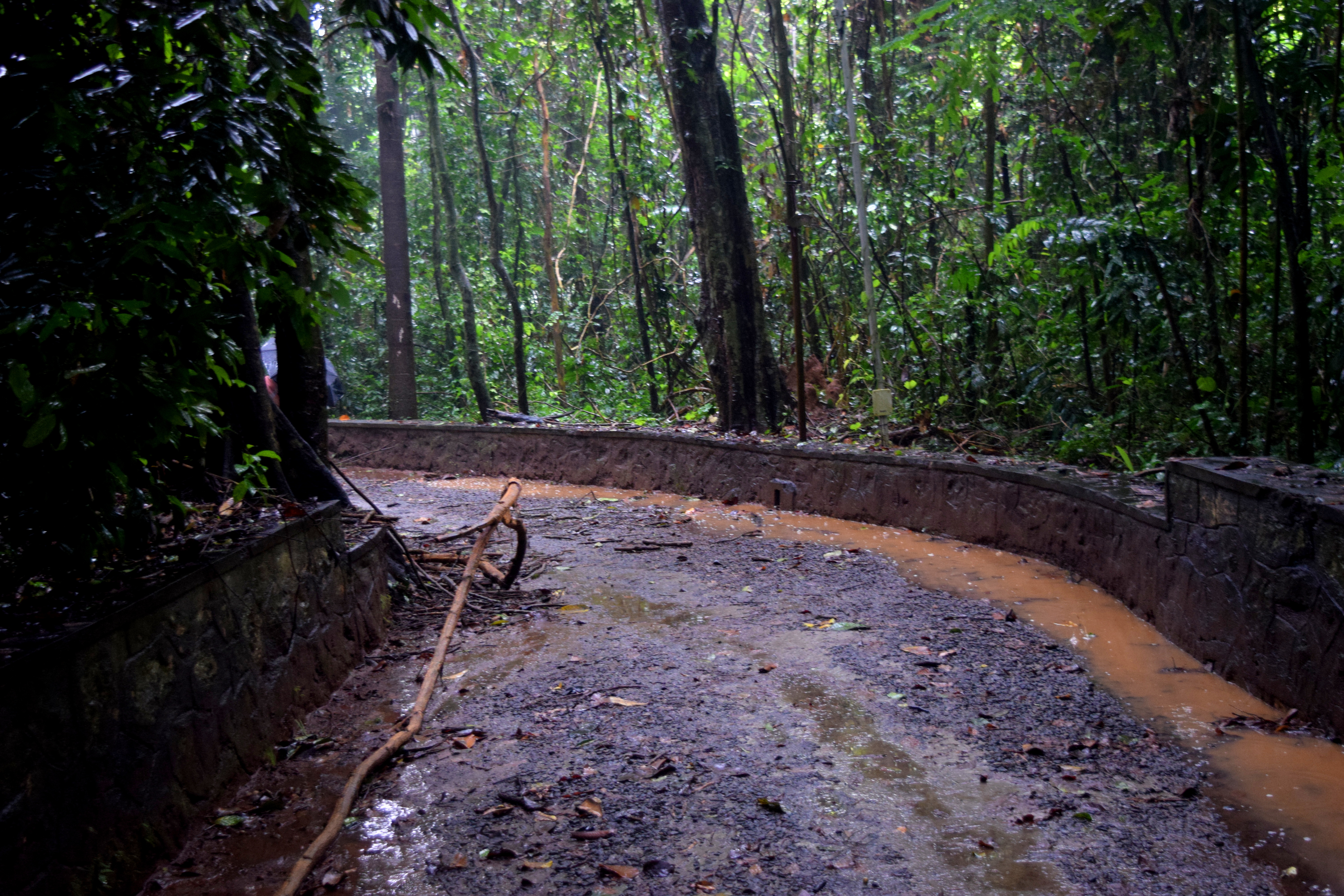

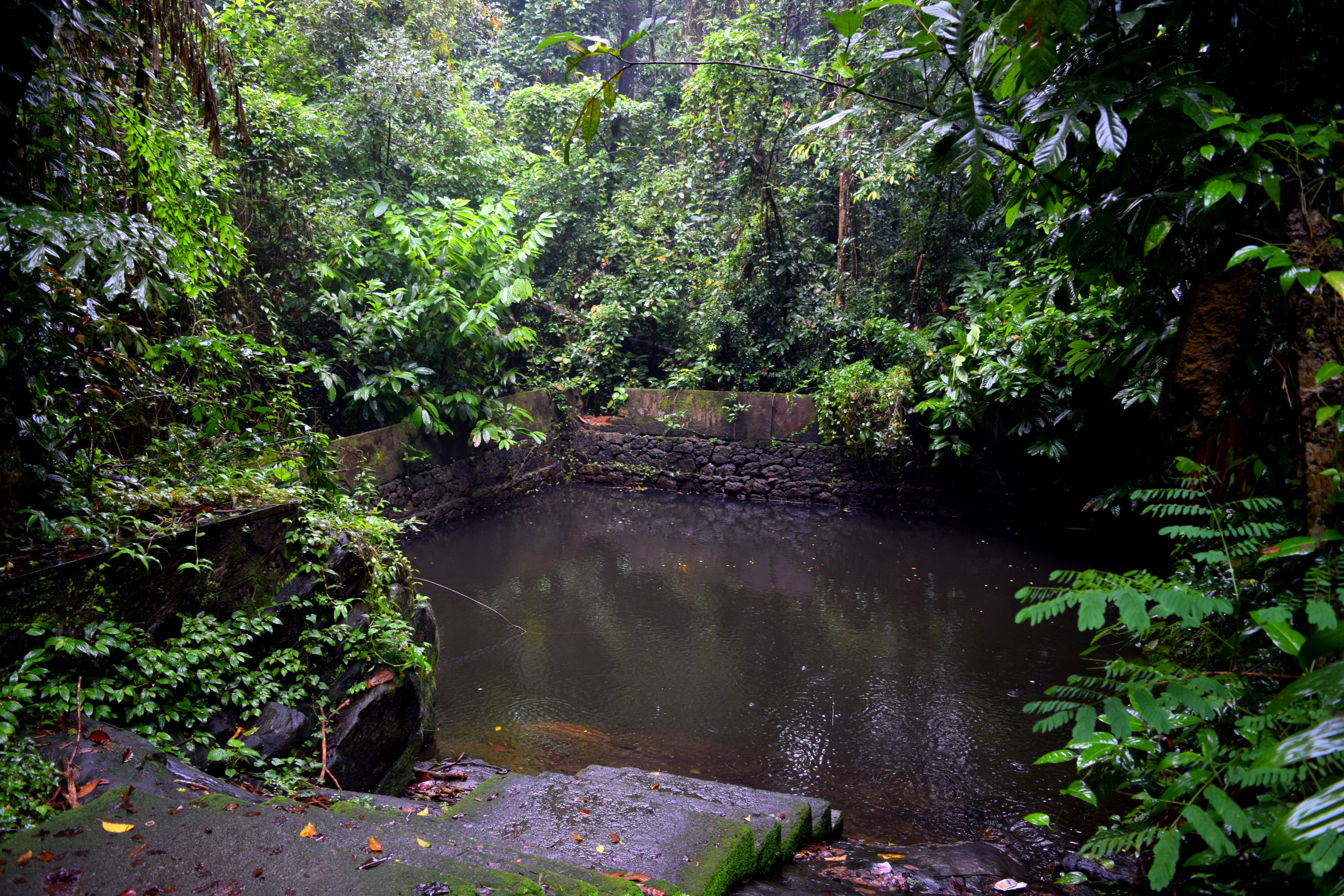

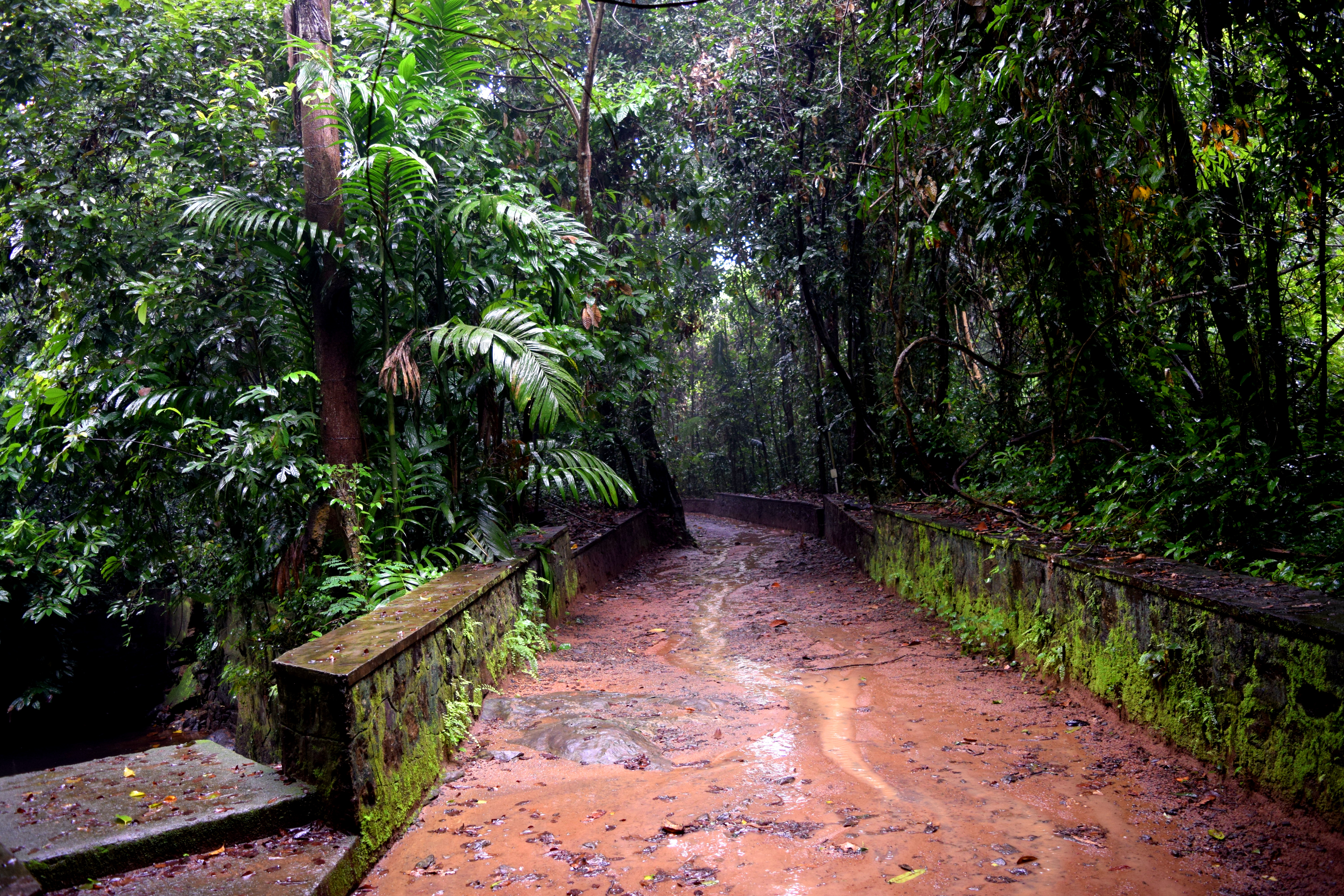

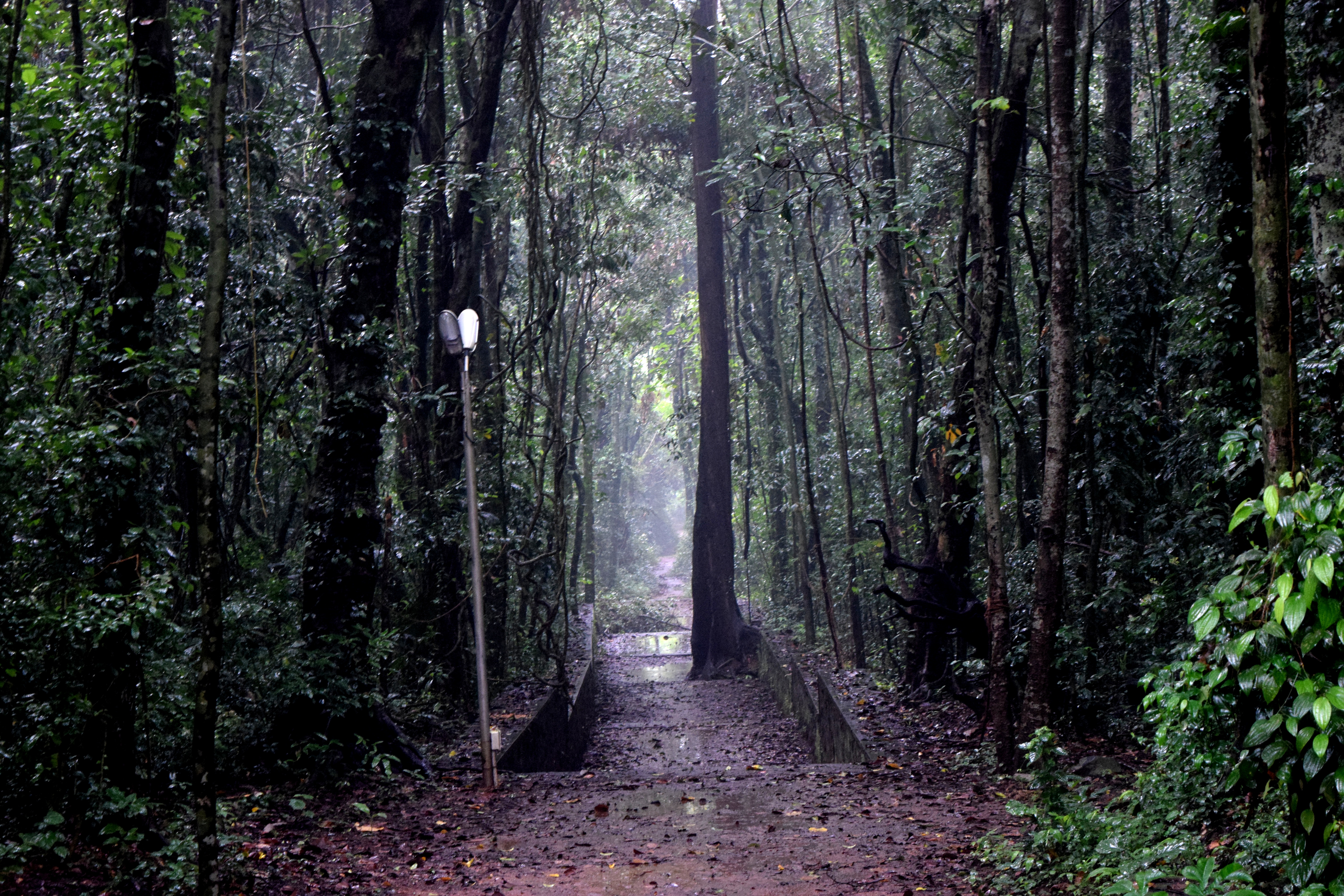

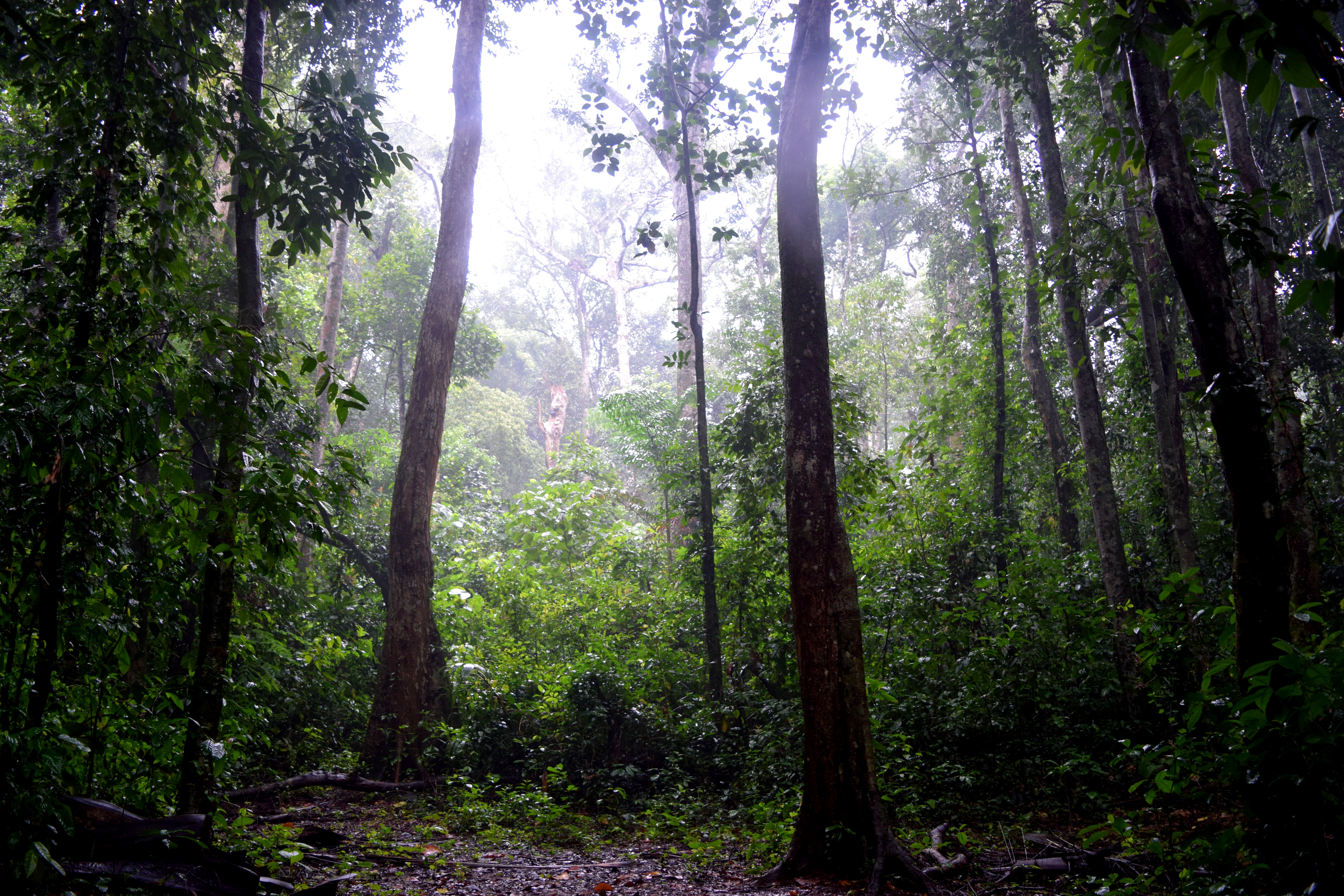

=== Iringol Kavu Temple ( Naganchery Mana ) ===
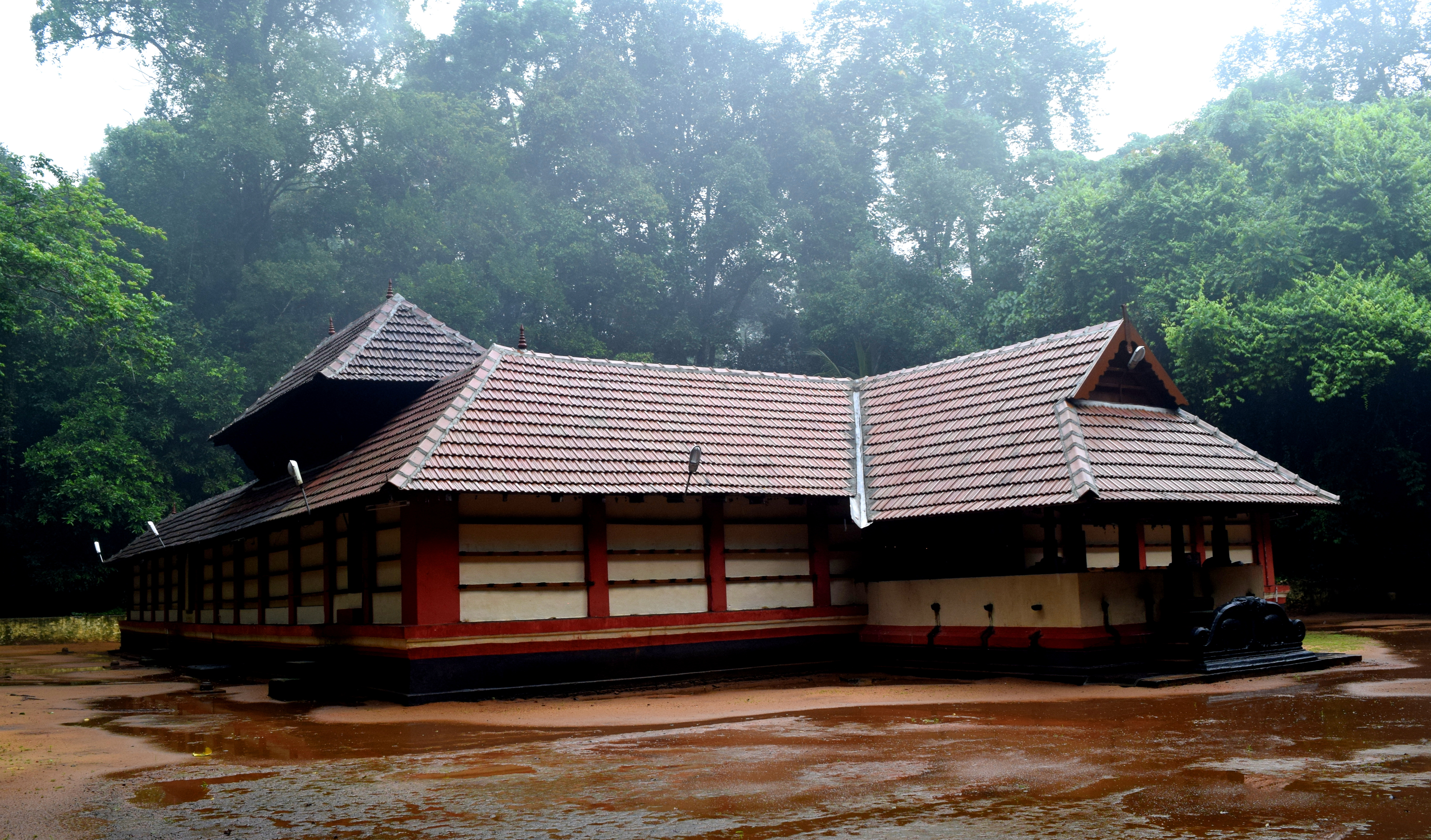

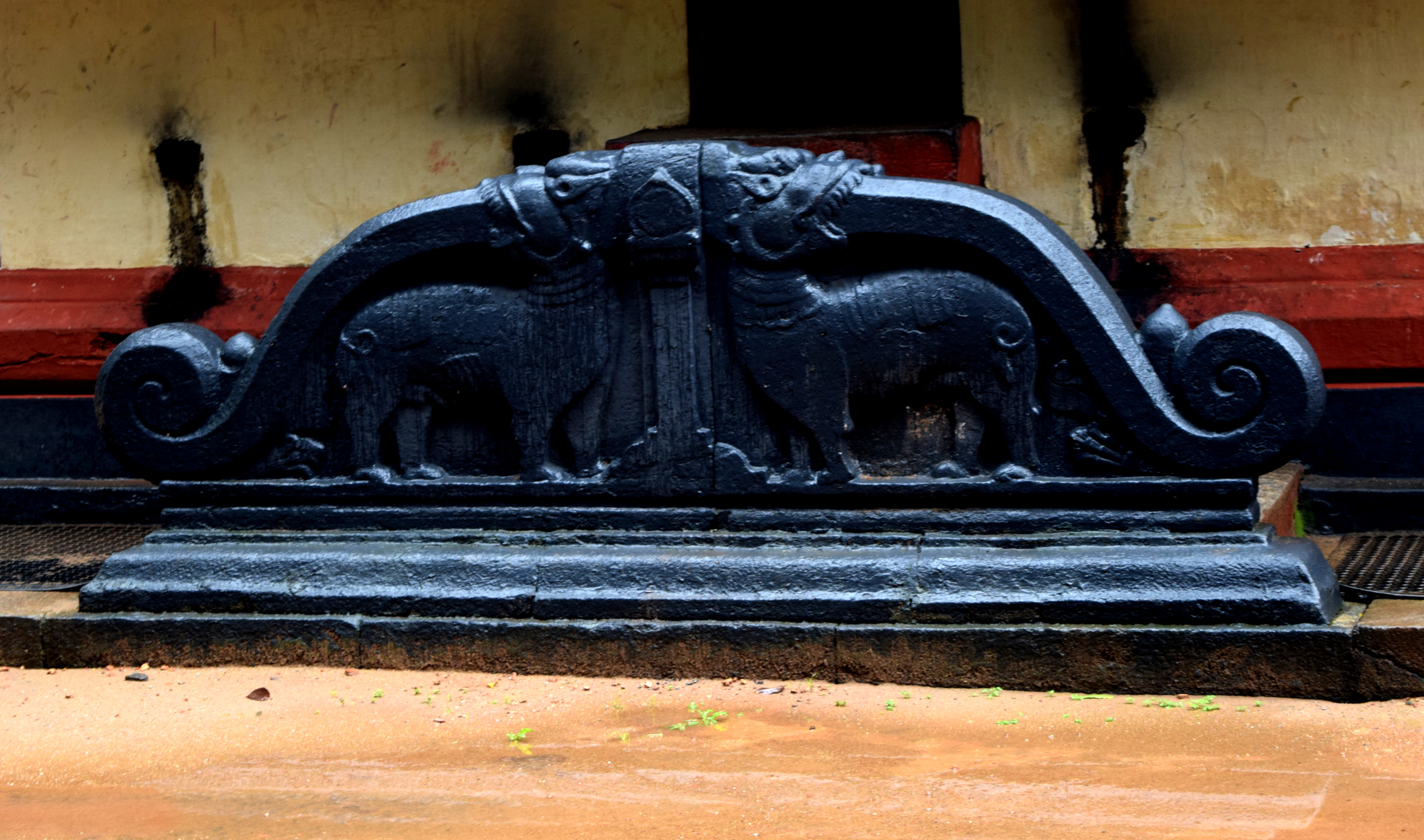

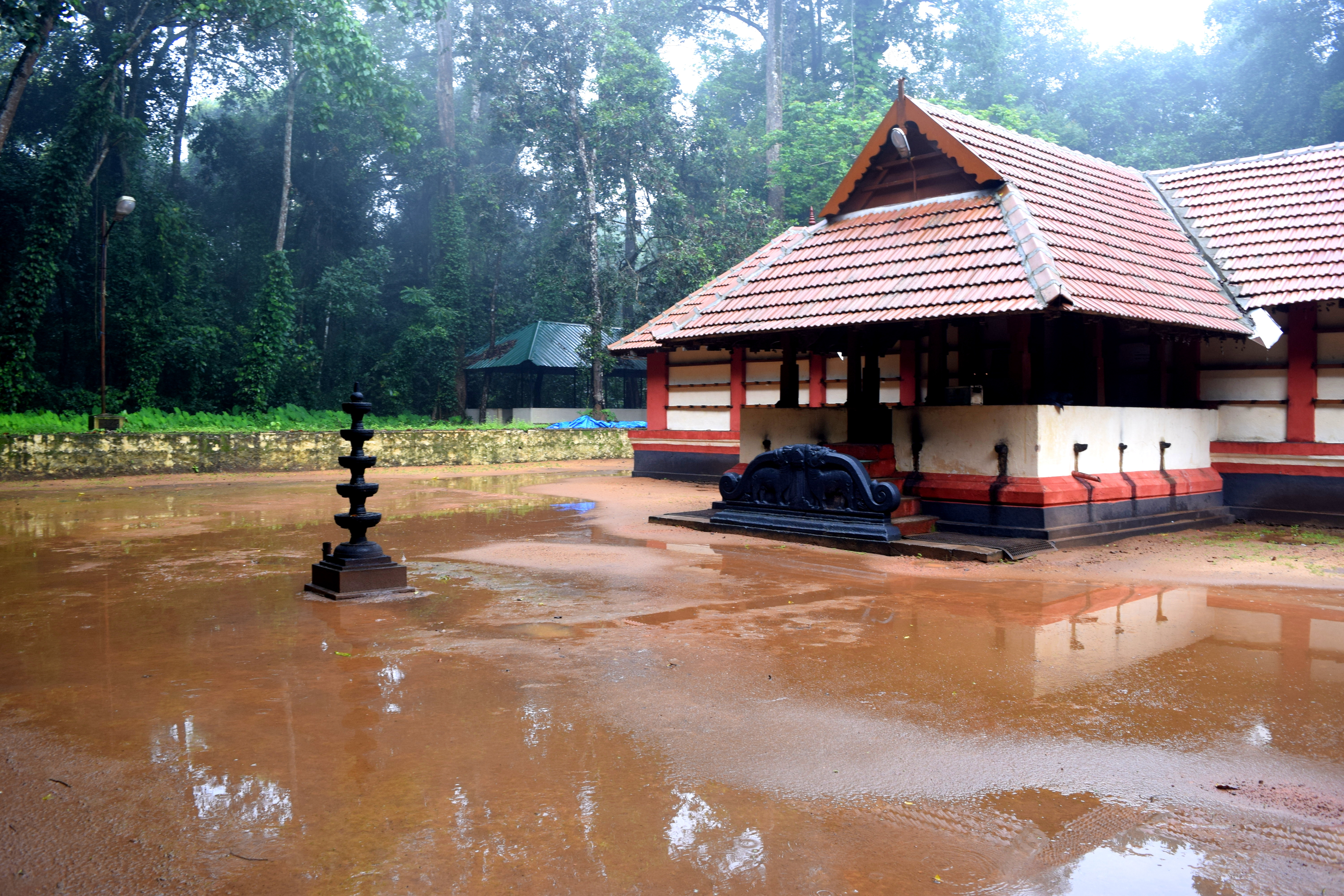

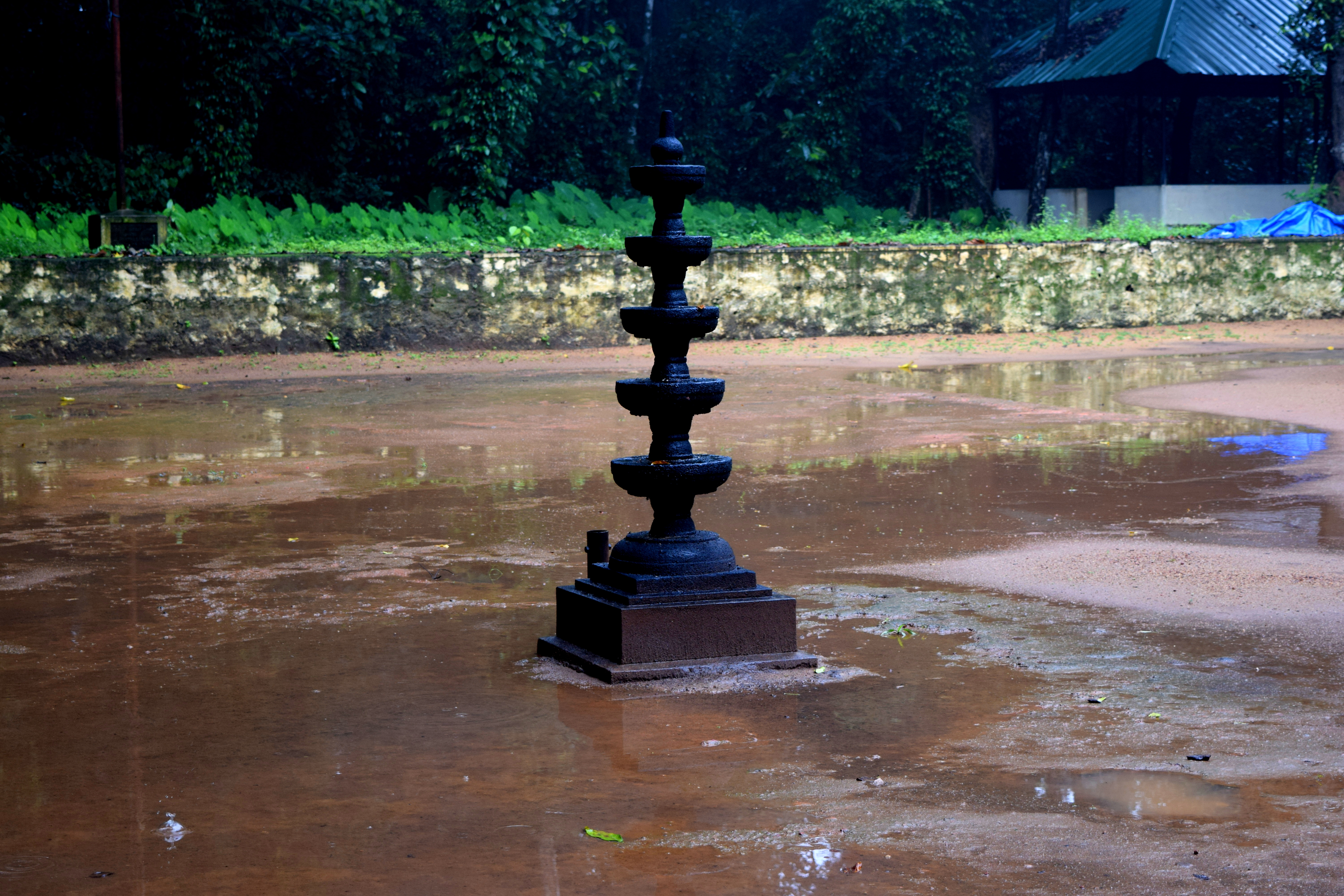

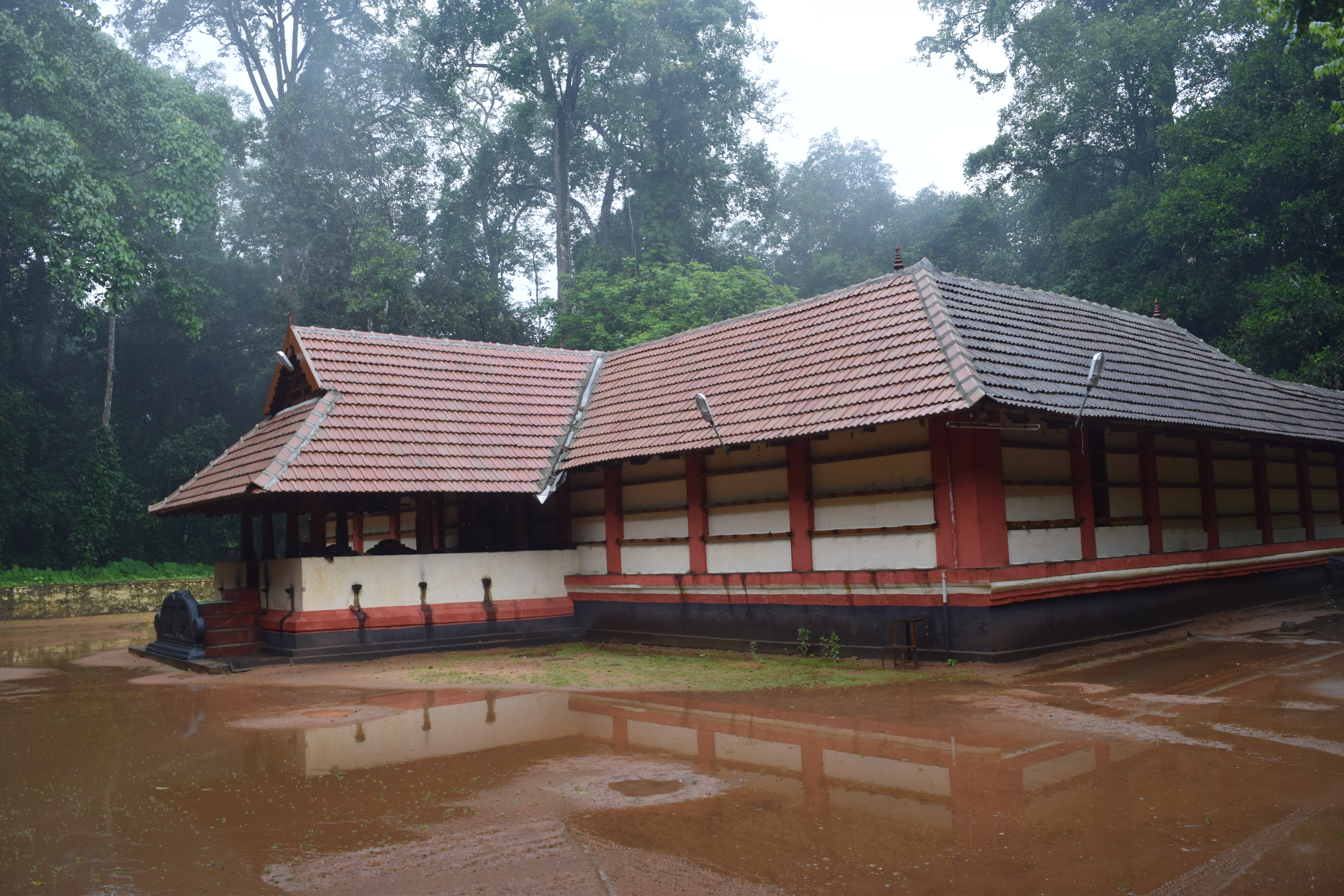

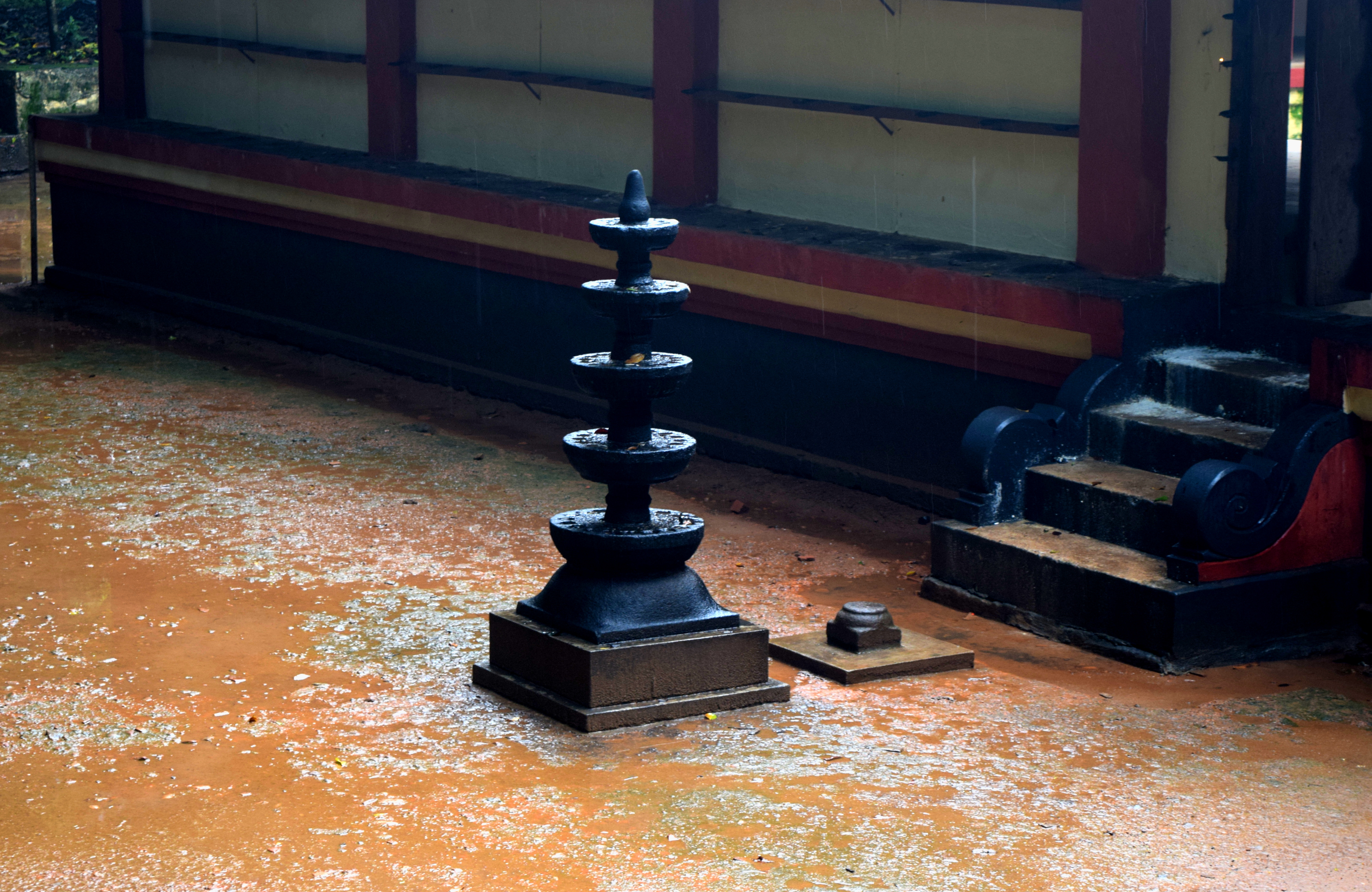

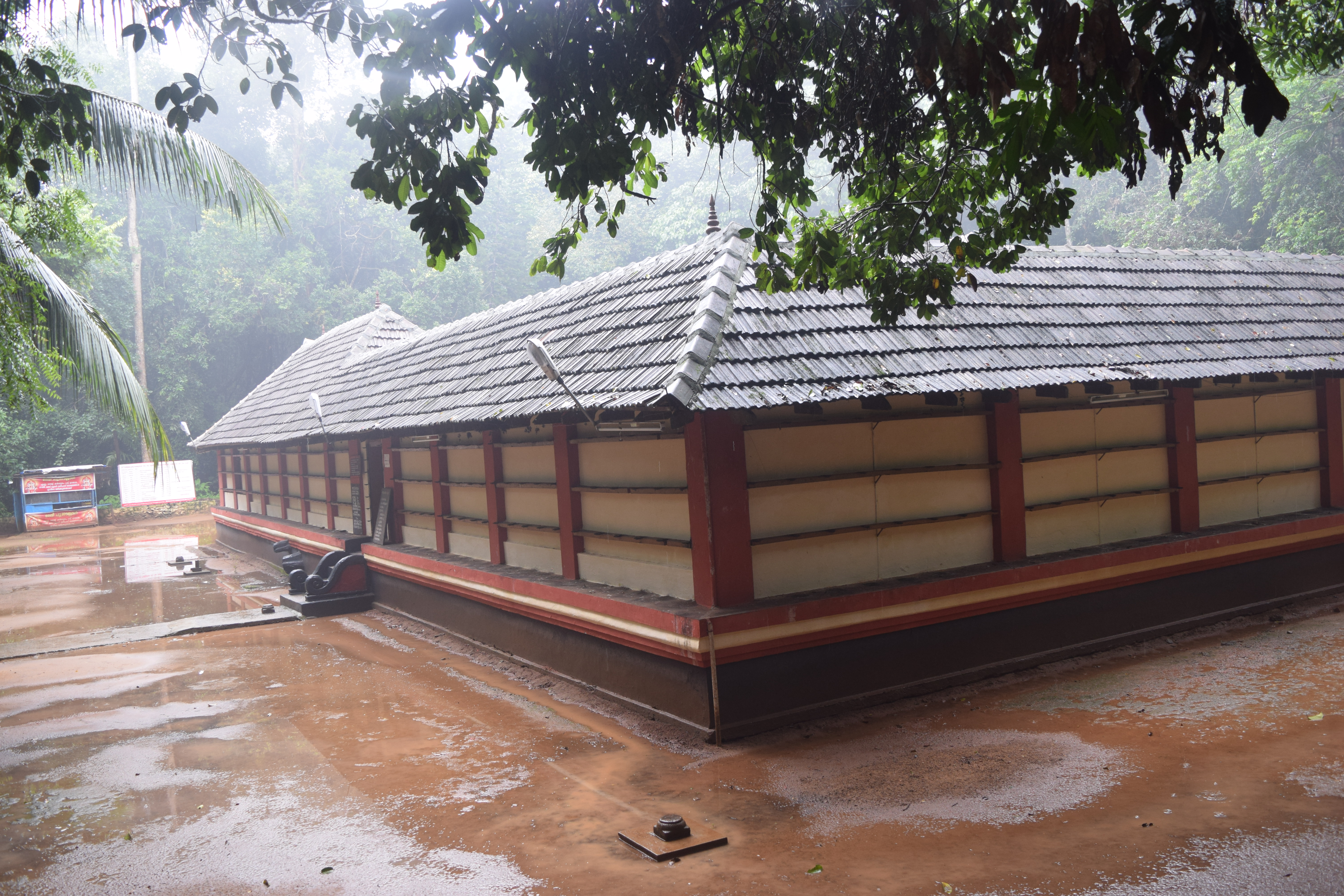
