= Mullipakkam =

Mullipakkam, Chengalpattu District
- Village
- Location in Tamil Nadu, India
- Coordinates: 12.655°N 80.11°E
- Country: India
- State: Tamil Nadu
- District: Chengalpattu district
- Taluk: Thiruporur
- Nearest Town: Chengalpattu
- Nearest Villages: Rayamangalam, Karumbakkam, Manampathy

Area
  - Total: 349.04 ha (862.5 acres)

Population
  - Total: 1,926

Languages
  - Official: Tamil
- Time zone: UTC+5:30 (IST)
- Postal code: 603105

Mullipakkam is a medium size village located at a distance of 12 km (approximately) away from the town of Chengalpattu. It comes under the Thiruporur Taluk and Chengalpattu District of Tamilnadu. It also comes under Mullipakkam panchayat. As per the 2011 census, 1,926 people living in the village. There are about 462 houses in Mullipakkam village. The total geographical area of village is 349.04 hectares.

== Transport ==
The following bus services are operating via Mullipakkam:

- 75: From Chengalpattu to Manampathy via Mullipakkam village.

== Notable Places ==
The following places are situated in the village of Mullipakkam:

- Panchayat Union Middle School, Mullipakkam.
- Ellaiamman Temple.
- Muthumari Amman Koil.
- Periya Palayathamman Temple.
- ECI St.Thomas Church.
