= Vengoor Gram Panchayat =

Vengoor is a Gram panchayat in Koovappady Block in Kunnathunadu Taluk in the Ernakulam District, state of Kerala, India.

It is one of the largest panchayats (248.01 km^{2}) in Kerala State. The nearest city is Perumbavoor and is around 10 km from Vengoor. Places around Vengoor are: Kombanad, Kuruppampady, Paniyely, Panamkuzhy, Chundakuzhy, Mekkappala, Mudakkuzha, Kodanadu and Nedungapra. The tourist attractions like "Paniyeli Poru Waterfalls" and "Panamkuzhy Mahogany forests" in the bank of the famous "Periyar River" are in Vengoor Panchayat. Vengoor Pincode is 683546 with 10.14946 latitude and 76.55806 longitude.
