= Rayamangalam, Tamil Nadu =

Rayamangalam, Chengalpattu District
- Village
- Location in Tamil Nadu, India
- Coordinates: 12.68°N 80.114°E
- Country: India
- State: Tamil Nadu
- District: Chengalpattu district
- Taluk: Thiruporur
- Nearest Town: Chengalpattu
- Panchayat: Mullipakkam

Area
  - Total: 162.43 ha (401.4 acres)

Population
  - Total: 478

Languages
  - Official: Tamil
- Time zone: UTC+5:30 (IST)
- PIN: 603105

Rayamangalam is a small village located at a distance of 16 km (approximately) away from the town of Chengalpattu and 13 km (approximately) away from Thiruporur. It comes under the Thiruporur Taluk and Chengalpattu District of Tamil Nadu. It also comes under Mullipakkam panchayat. As per the 2011 census, 478 people living in the village. There are about 116 houses in Rayamangalam village. The total geographical area of village is 162.43 hectares.

== Transportation ==
The following bus services are operating via Rayamangalam:

- 75: From Chengalpattu to Manampathy (via Mullipakkam, Rayamangalam, Senneri).

== Notable Places ==
The following places are situated in the village of Rayamangalam:

- Panchayat Union Middle School, Rayamangalam.
- Shri Muthu Mariyamman Koil, Rayamangalam.
- Vinayagar Koil, Rayamangalam.
- Hanuman Koil, Rayamangalam.
- Parambenchery Check Dam, Rayamagalam.
