= Karumbakkam =

Village in Tamil Nadu, India

Coordinates: 12.704°N 80.092°E

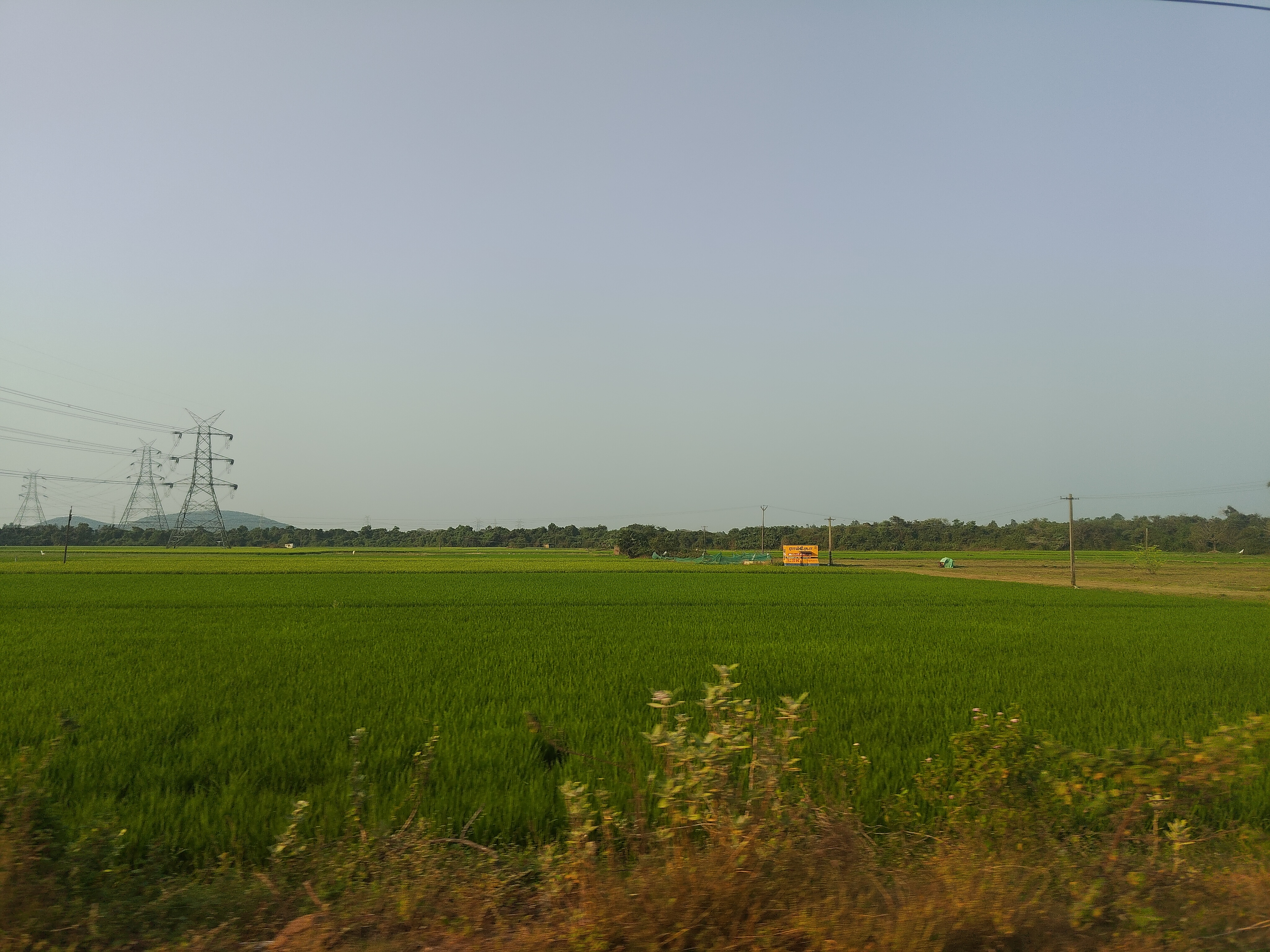
Field in Karumbakkam

Karumbakkam is a village located in the Chengalpattu taluk of the Kanchipuram district of the Indian state Tamil Nadu. According to the 2011 Census information, the total geographical area of the village is 184.89 hectares (0.714 mi^{2}), and the total population is 1,330.
