= Kombanad =

- village
- Interactive map of Kombanad
- Coordinates: 10°9′0″N 76°33′0″E
- Country: India
- State: Kerala
- District: Ernakulam

Population (2011)
  - Total: 10,976

Languages
  - Official: Malayalam, English
- Time zone: UTC+5:30 (IST)
- PIN: 683555 (683546)
- Telephone code: 91 484 2648/847...
- Vehicle registration: kl-40
- Nearest city: perumbavoor
- Lok Sabha constituency: chalakkudy
- Vidhan Sabha constituency: perumbavoor
- Climate: tropical (Köppen)

Kombanad is a village in Ernakulam district in the Indian state of Kerala.

== Tourism ==
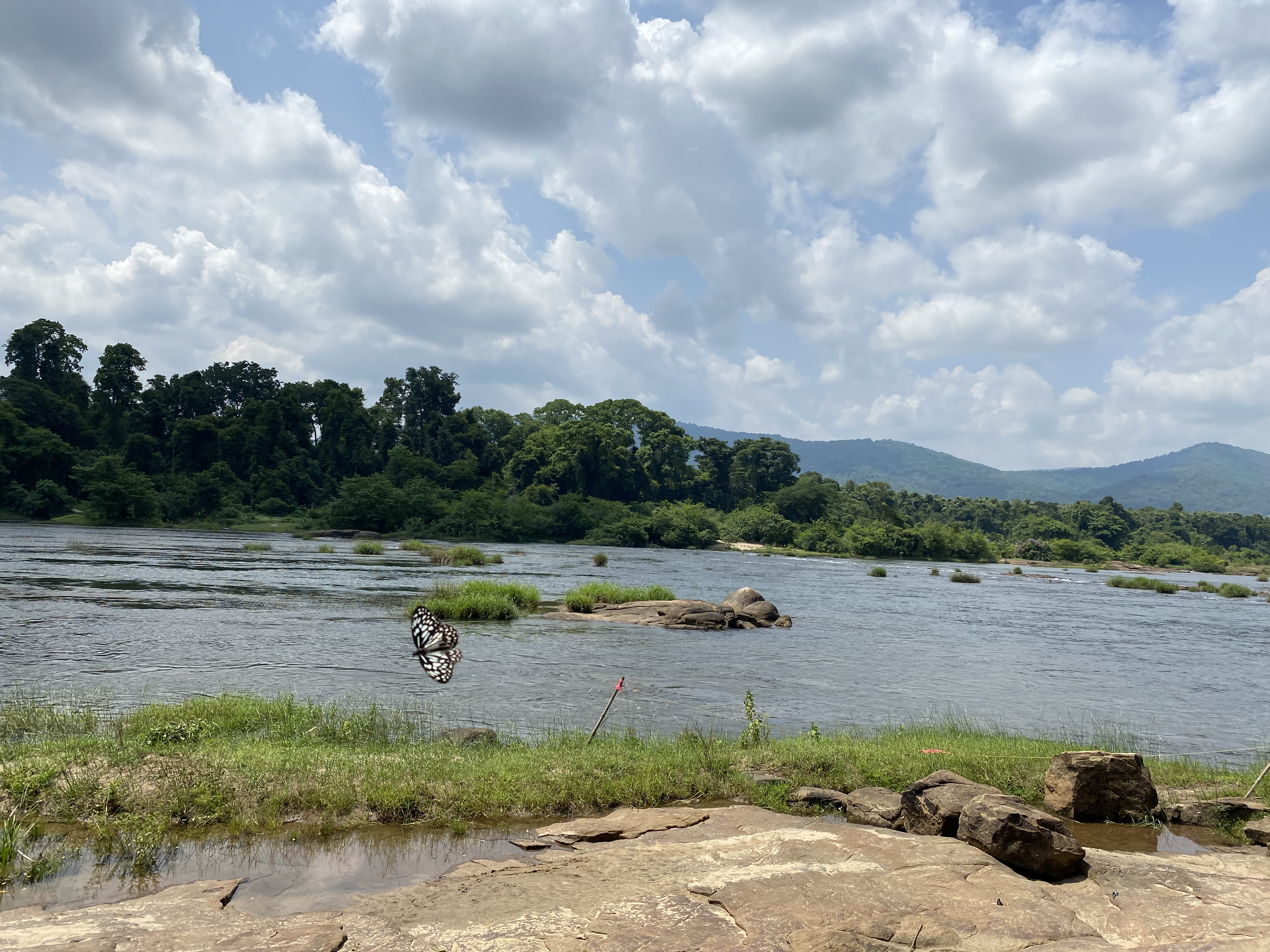
Panieli Poru

Panieli Poru, the famous waterfalls and picnic spot is just 5 km away from Kombanad. Panamkuzhy river and mahogany plantation, another picnic spot, is also just 4 km away from Kombanad.haritha bio park. The famous Kodanad elephant training centre and mini zoo is also just 15 minutes drive from Kombanad.

== Economy ==
Kombanad is a small junction with all facilities including banks, hospitals, educational institutions, government offices, temples, churches, etc. Most of the peoples belongs to farmers and the land is filled with rubber, coconut, arecanut, plantain, pineapple and rice paddy fields.

== Kunnathnadu Tehsil ==
This village is part of Kunnathnadu taluk of Ernakulam district. Other towns in this area include Kizhakkambalam, Kombanad, Mazhuvannoor, Rayamangalam and thiruvaniyoor.

== Demographics ==
According to the 2011 census of India, Kombanad has 2810 households. The literacy rate of the village is 84.96%.

Demographics (2011 Census)
| | Total | Male | Female |
|---|---|---|---|
| Population | 10976 | 5501 | 5475 |
| Children aged below 6 years | 948 | 497 | 451 |
| Scheduled caste | 1099 | 562 | 537 |
| Scheduled tribe | 313 | 159 | 154 |
| Literates | 9325 | 4757 | 4568 |
| Workers (all) | 5089 | 3345 | 1744 |
| Main workers (total) | 3956 | 2873 | 1083 |
| Main workers: Cultivators | 490 | 420 | 70 |
| Main workers: Agricultural labourers | 897 | 483 | 414 |
| Main workers: Household industry workers | 50 | 39 | 11 |
| Main workers: Other | 2519 | 1931 | 588 |
| Marginal workers (total) | 1133 | 472 | 661 |
| Marginal workers: Cultivators | 99 | 61 | 38 |
| Marginal workers: Agricultural labourers | 459 | 192 | 267 |
| Marginal workers: Household industry workers | 6 | 4 | 2 |
| Marginal workers: Others | 569 | 215 | 354 |
| Non-workers | 5887 | 2156 | 3731 |
