= Panchami Land =

Land assigned to Dalits during the British Raj

Panchami land is the assigned land which was distributed for Dalits in Tamil Nadu during the British rule in 1892. It can neither be sold nor re-classified.

== History ==
In 1891, the Chingleput collector J. H. A. Tremenheere submitted his study on socio-economic condition of Dalits in Tamil Nadu to the British administration. Based on his recommendation Depressed Classes Land Act was passed on September 30 under Government Order No 1010/10-A (revenue) 1892. And 12 lakh acres were assigned to Dalits across Tamil Nadu.

== Retrieval of Panchami Lands ==
Most of the panchami lands were occupied by non dalits in the names of others and pattas were transferred by officials. Even the State government has allotted panchami lands to Special Economic Zones or Industrial parks. The struggle for retrieval of panchami land is being organized by various groups. Around 750 acres of Panchami land in Melur taluk were allegedly encroached by granite companies involved in quarrying scam

Government had constituted first state-level retrieve committee in 1991–1996 to study and submit a report suggesting modalities for retrieving panchami lands occupied by non-Dalits and restoring its ownership to Dalits. The next panel was headed by Justice M. Maruthamuthu in January 2011. Three-member third committee was formed on October 8, 2013, with secretaries of revenue and Adi Dravidar and tribal welfare departments as its members.

== Related Schemes ==
1. Assigned land in Andhra Pradesh
2. Akram-Sakram land in Karnataka
3. Gairan land in Maharashtra
4. Moh Jameen Moh Diha land in Odisha
5. Bhoodan Land in India
