= Panieli Poru =

Rapids in Kerala, India

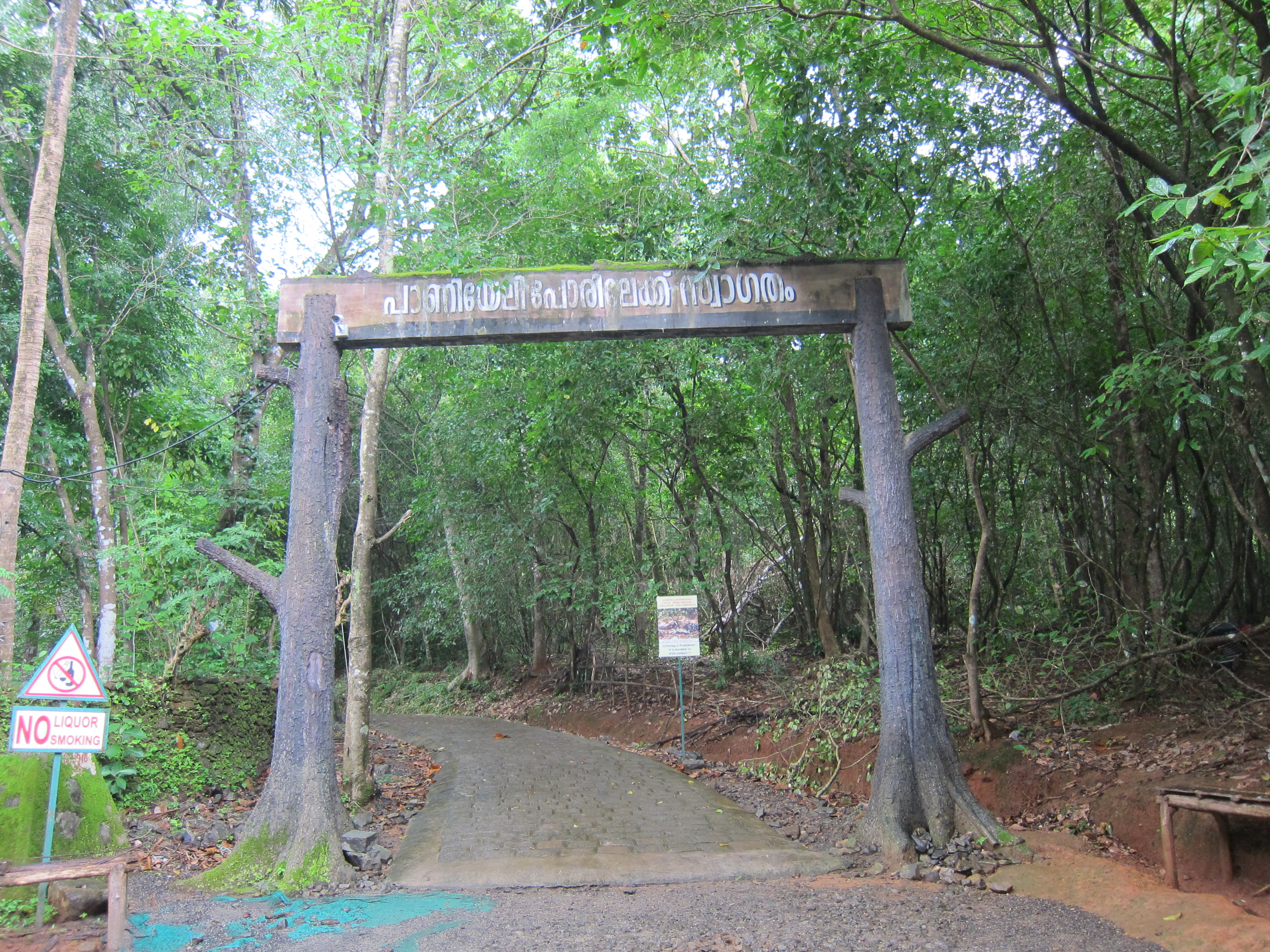
Entrance to Panieli Poru rapids

Panieli Poru is a tourist spot in the Ernakulam region of Kerala, India caused by a natural bottleneck in the flow of the Periyar River due to rock formations.

The river, which is shallow and wide until just before the rock formations, is forced to flow through some narrow crevices in the large rocks and to flow over shallower rocks, which increases its momentum and creates a great deal of turbulence. Nevertheless, this turbulence will not be visible on the surface.

Although not a waterfall destination in the exact sense of the word, water and rocks together make for a picturesque scene at Panieli Poru, a little-known spot on the eastern tracts of Ernakulam district. Situated along the Malayattoor forest tracts, 20 km from Perumbavoor, the place casts an enchanting spell that mesmerises the visitor. The Periyar gushes along the rocky terrain here. The rivulets of the Periyar, having separated upstream, join hands at the spot and continue the onward journey. The flowing water makes a symphony along with the chirping of the birds in the nearby forest. It is indeed an alluring locale for those who have a love for nature's splendour.

The locale attracts a steady stream of visitors from around the world. However, extreme precaution should be taken while visiting the place since numerous accidents and deaths have occurred in the area majorly due to undercurrents . Nearly 89 deaths have occurred at the tourist spot in the last two decades. Currently the tourism department has installed warning sign boards and local guards from " Vana samrakshana samathi" to ensure safety of the tourists.

== Gallery ==
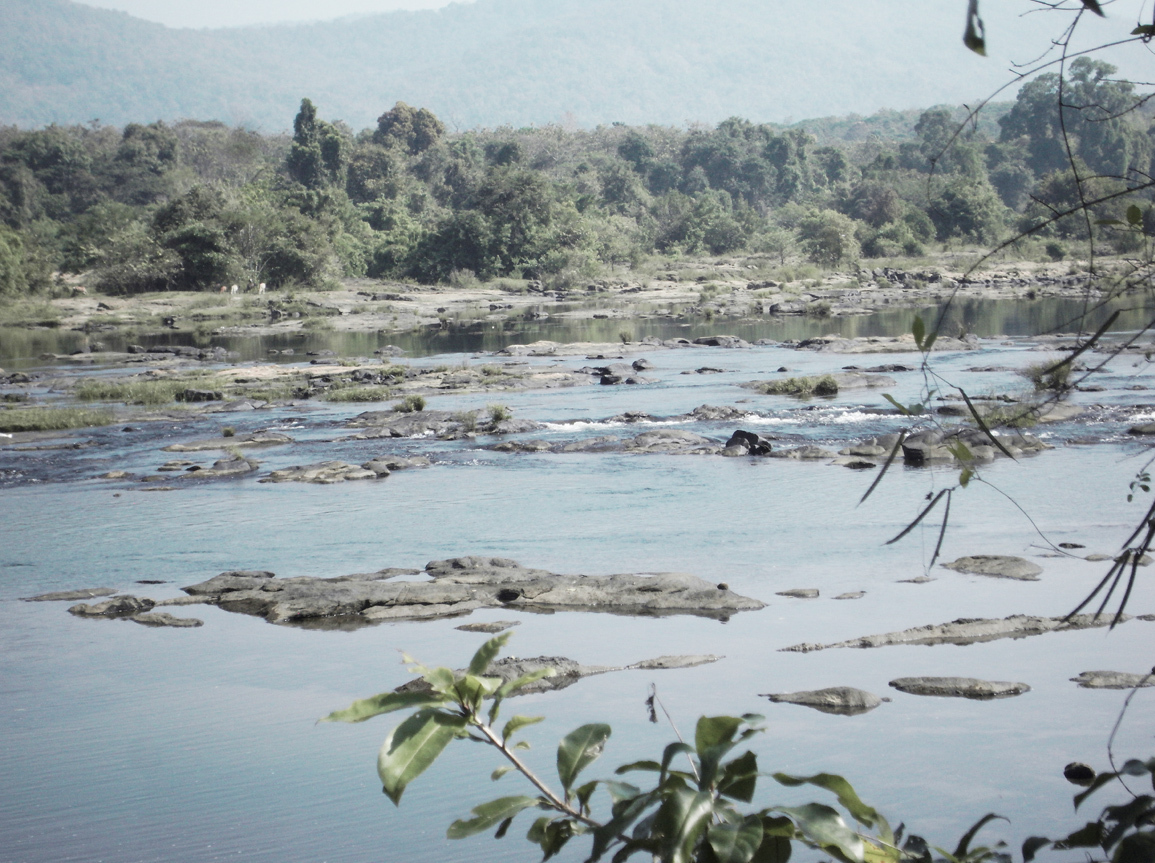

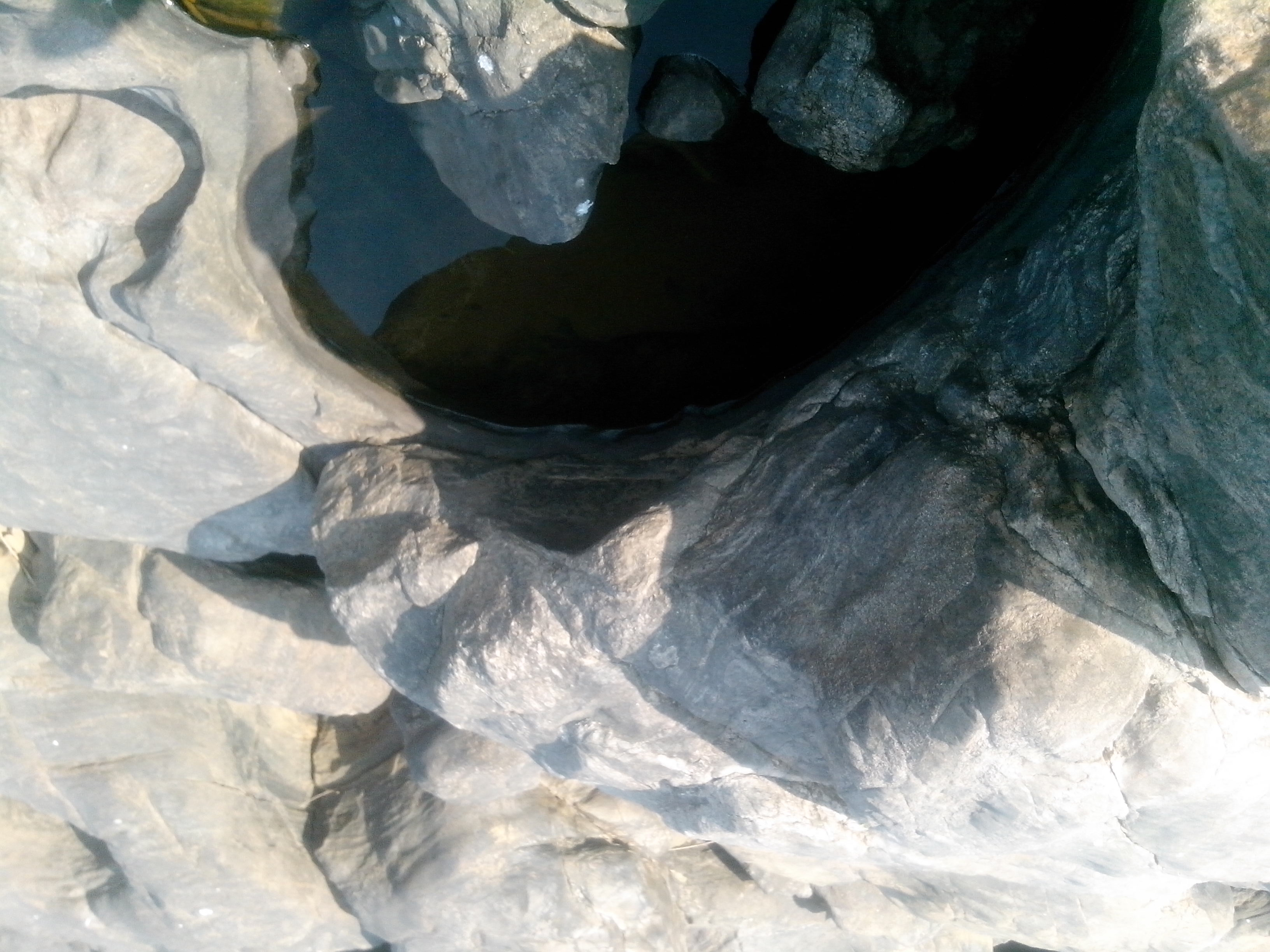
The pit formed due to the continues movement of water against the stones inside.

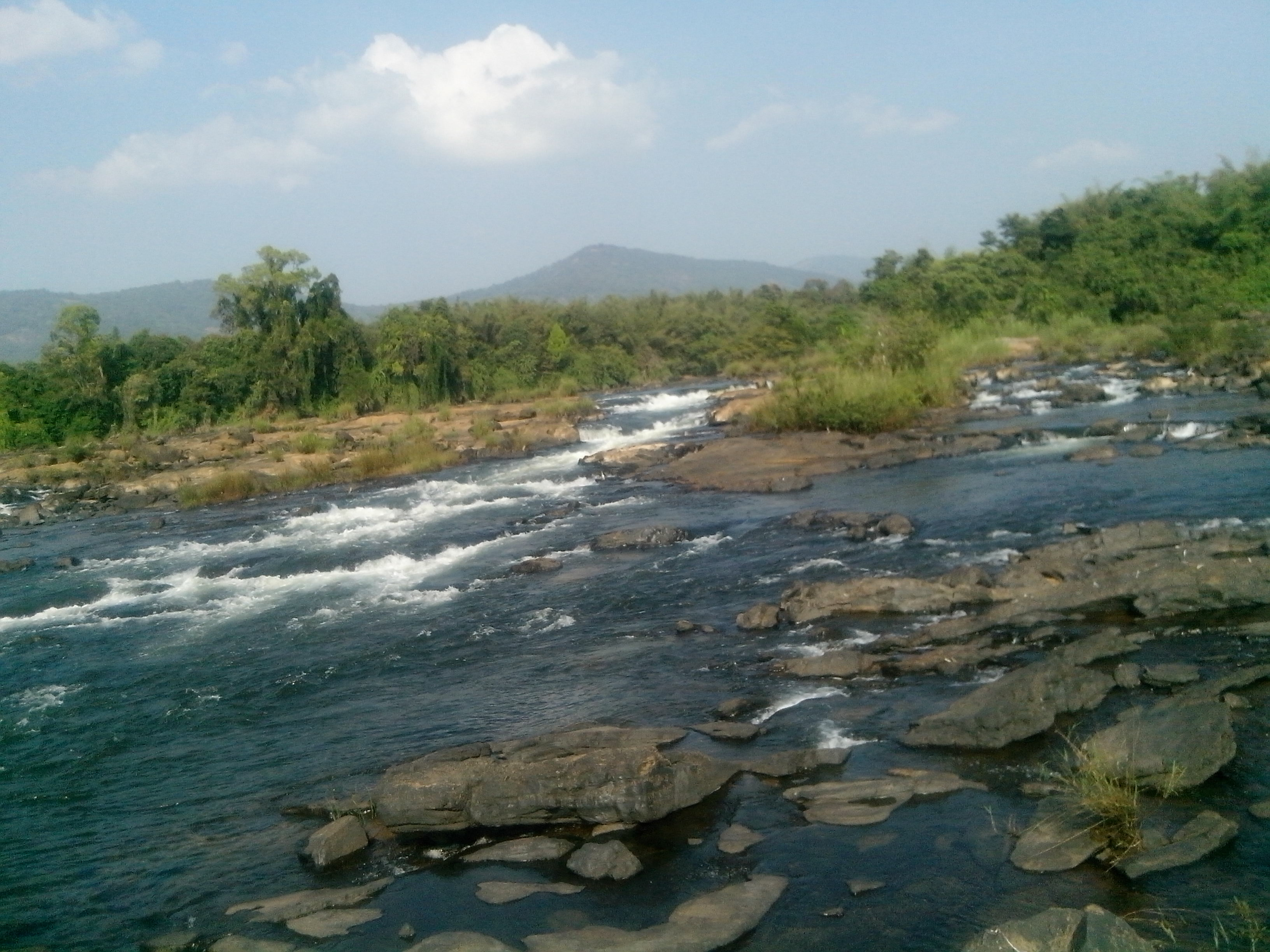

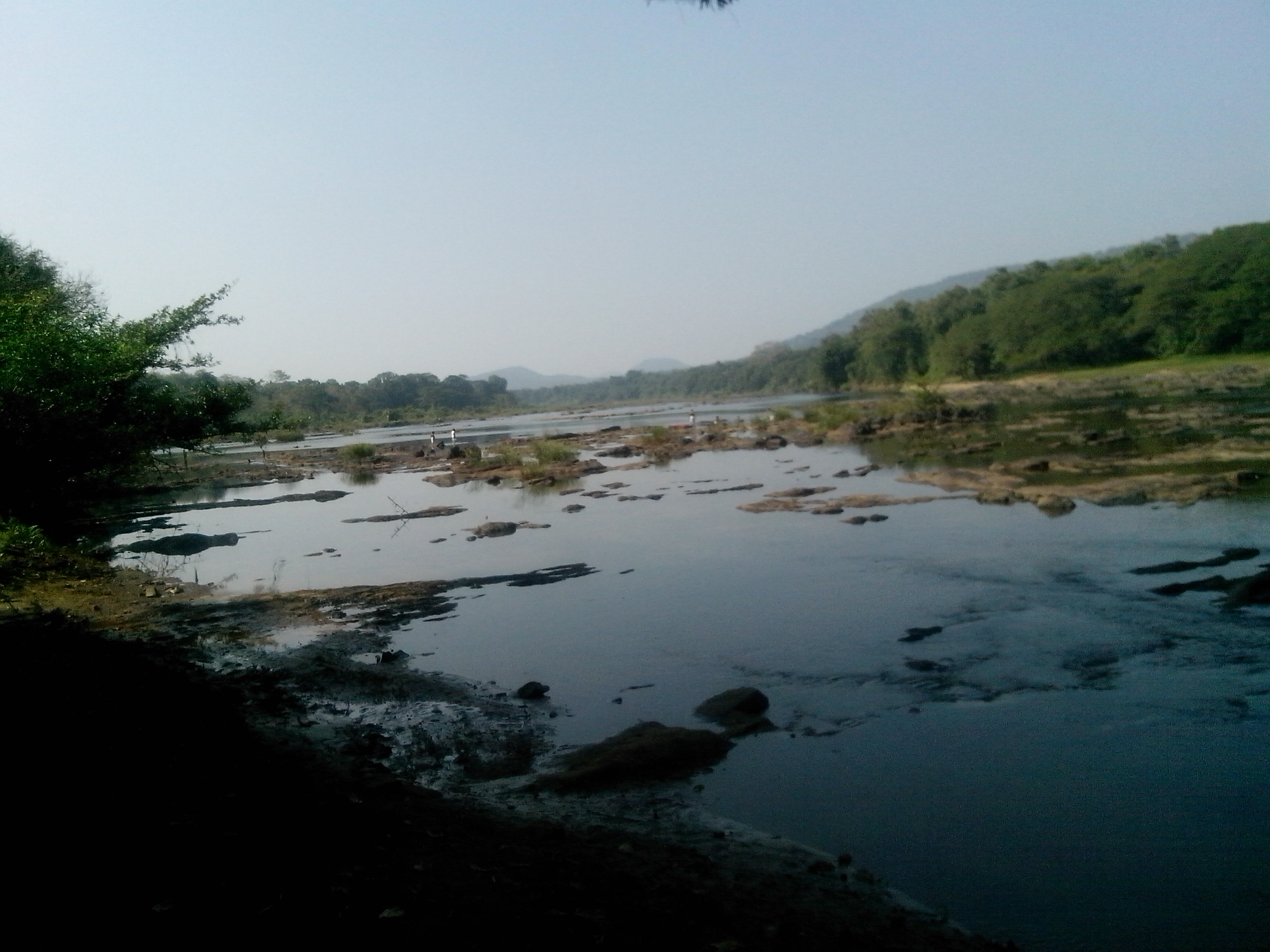

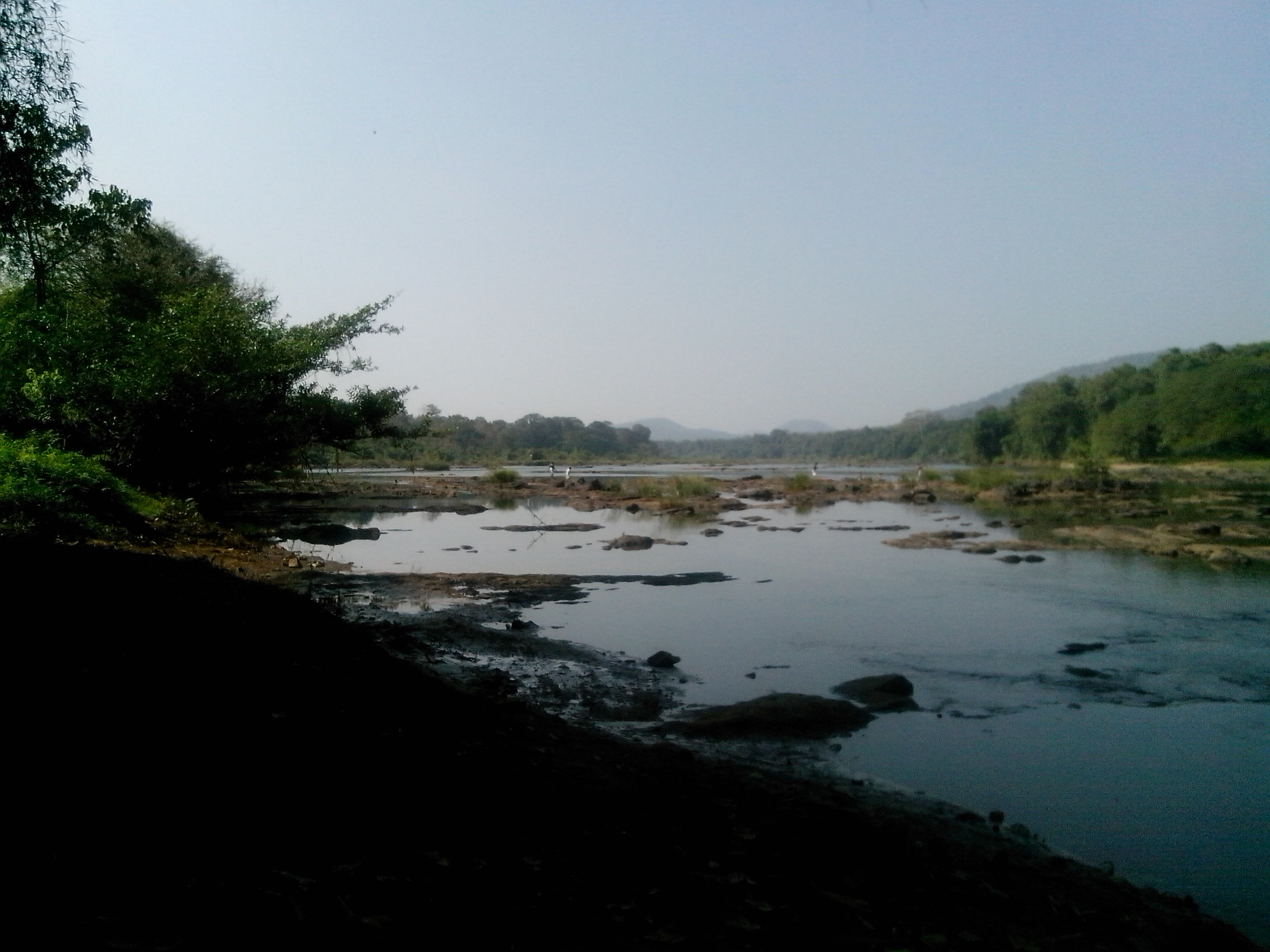

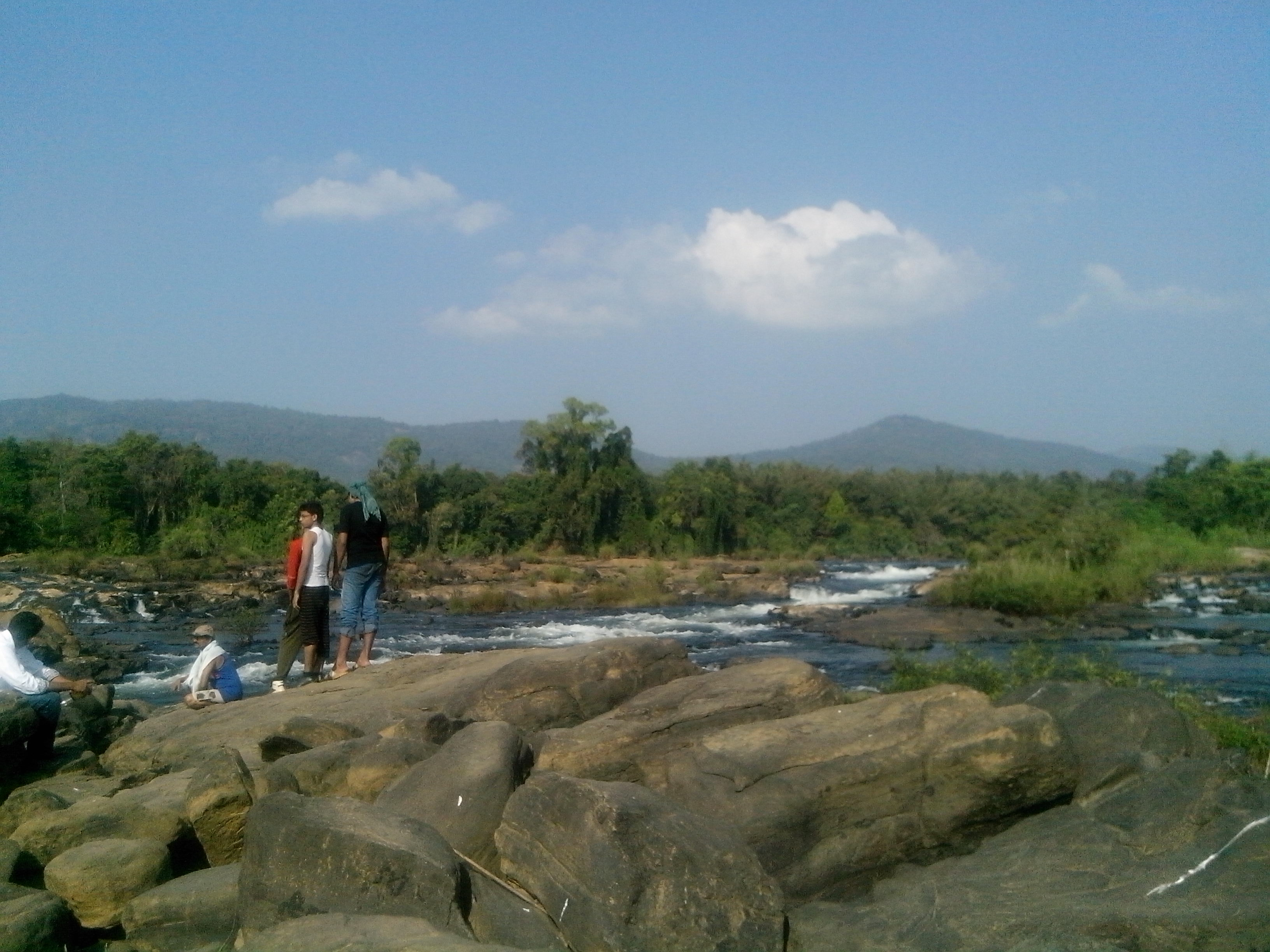

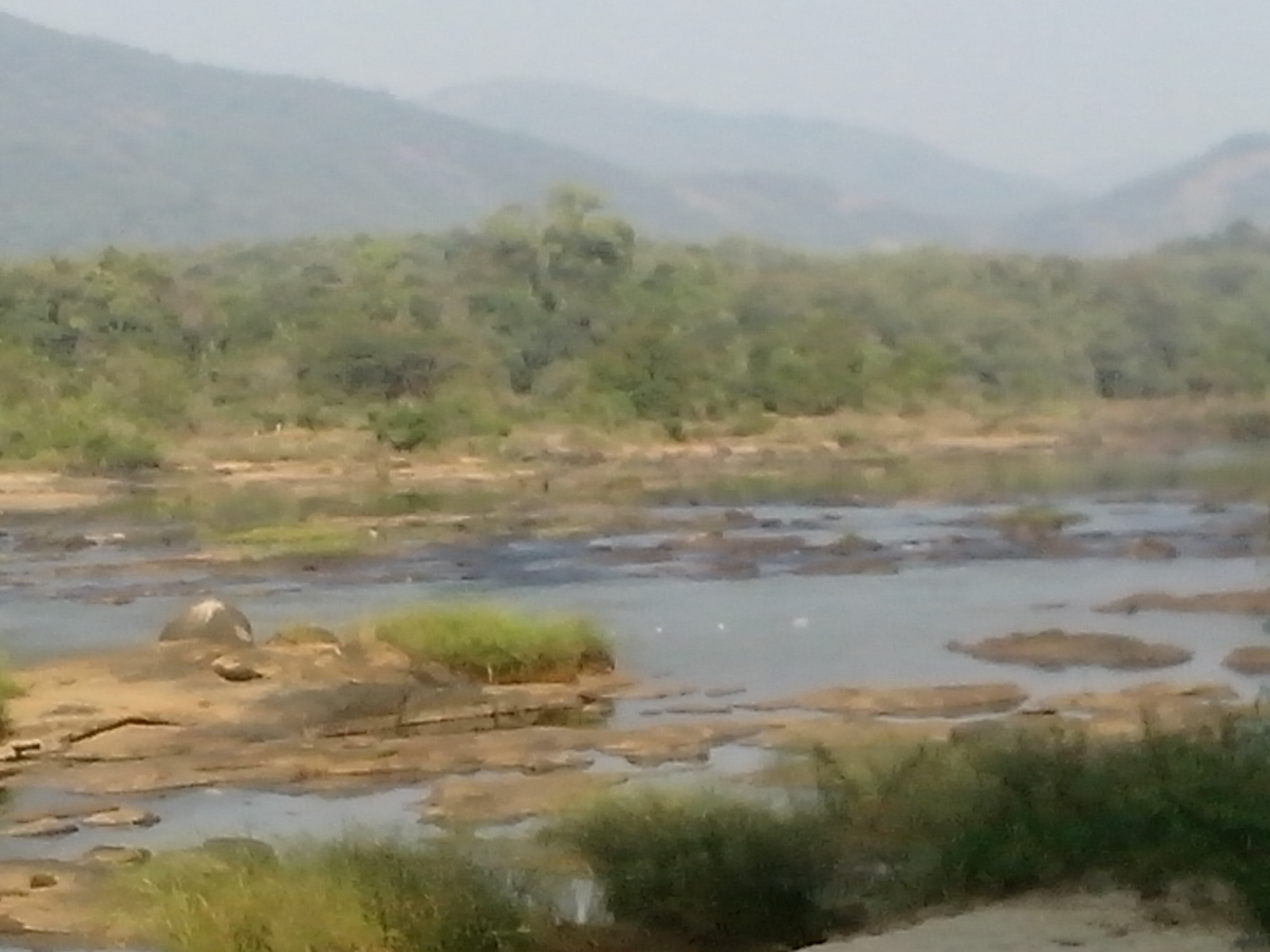

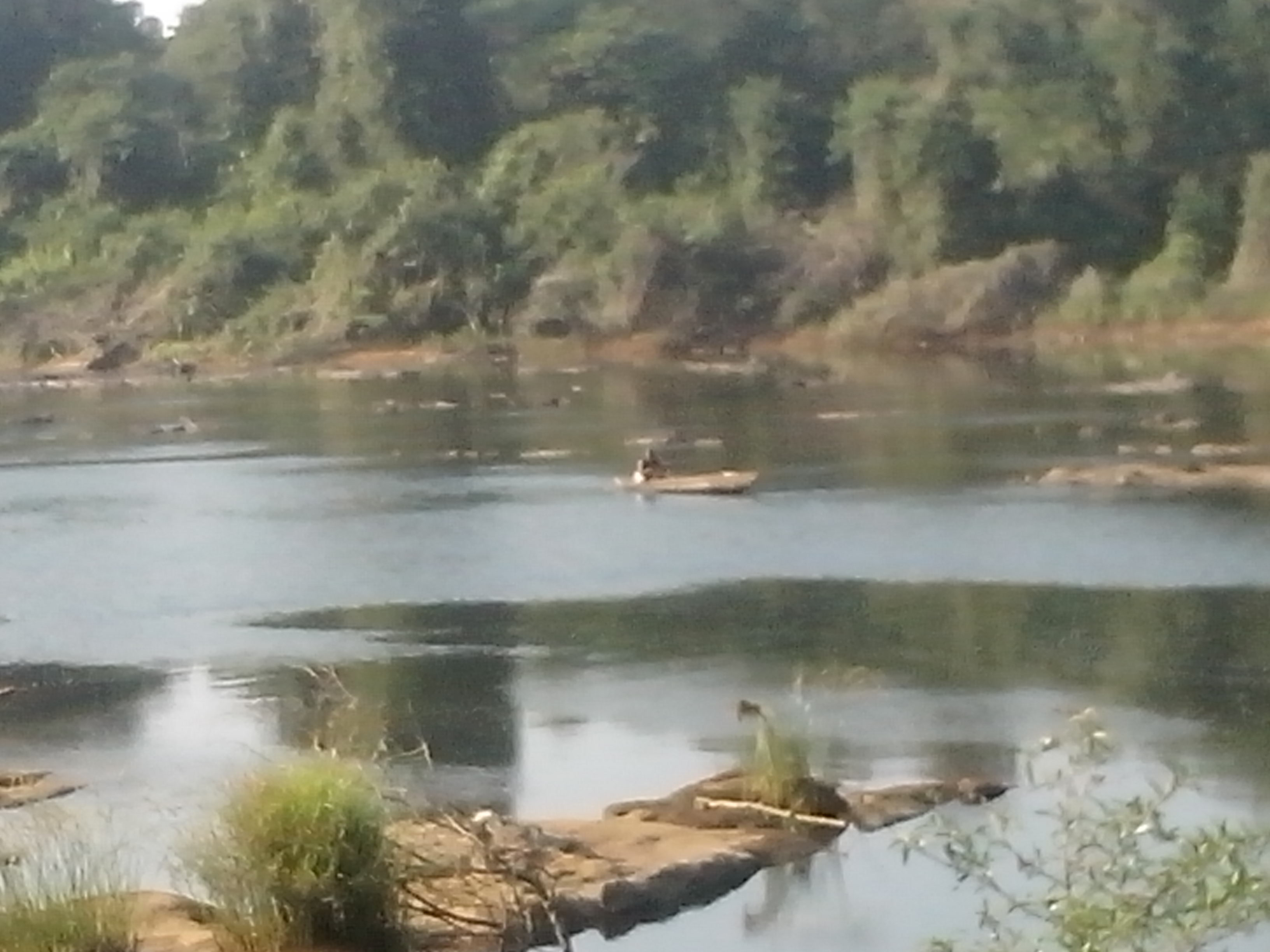

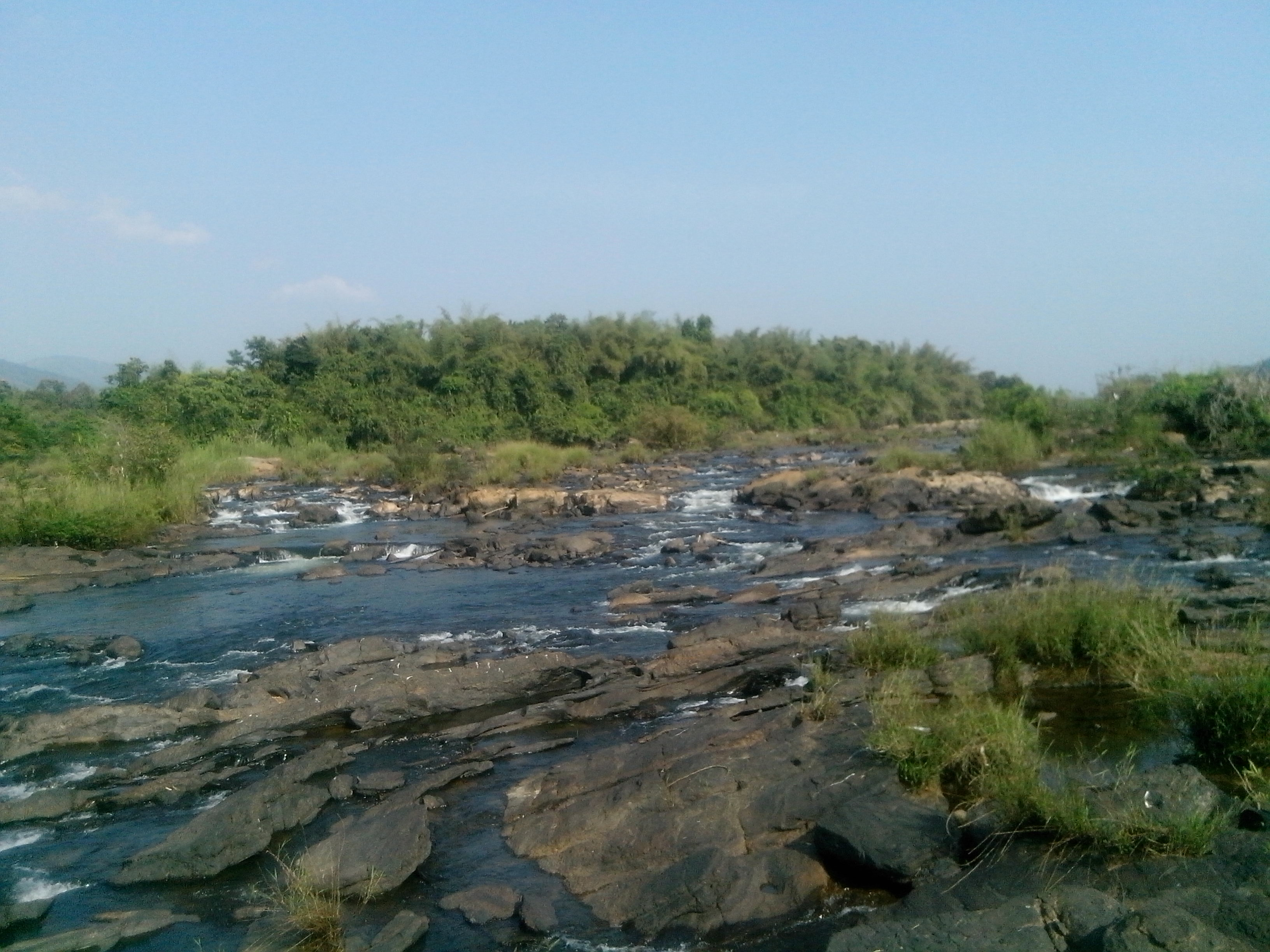

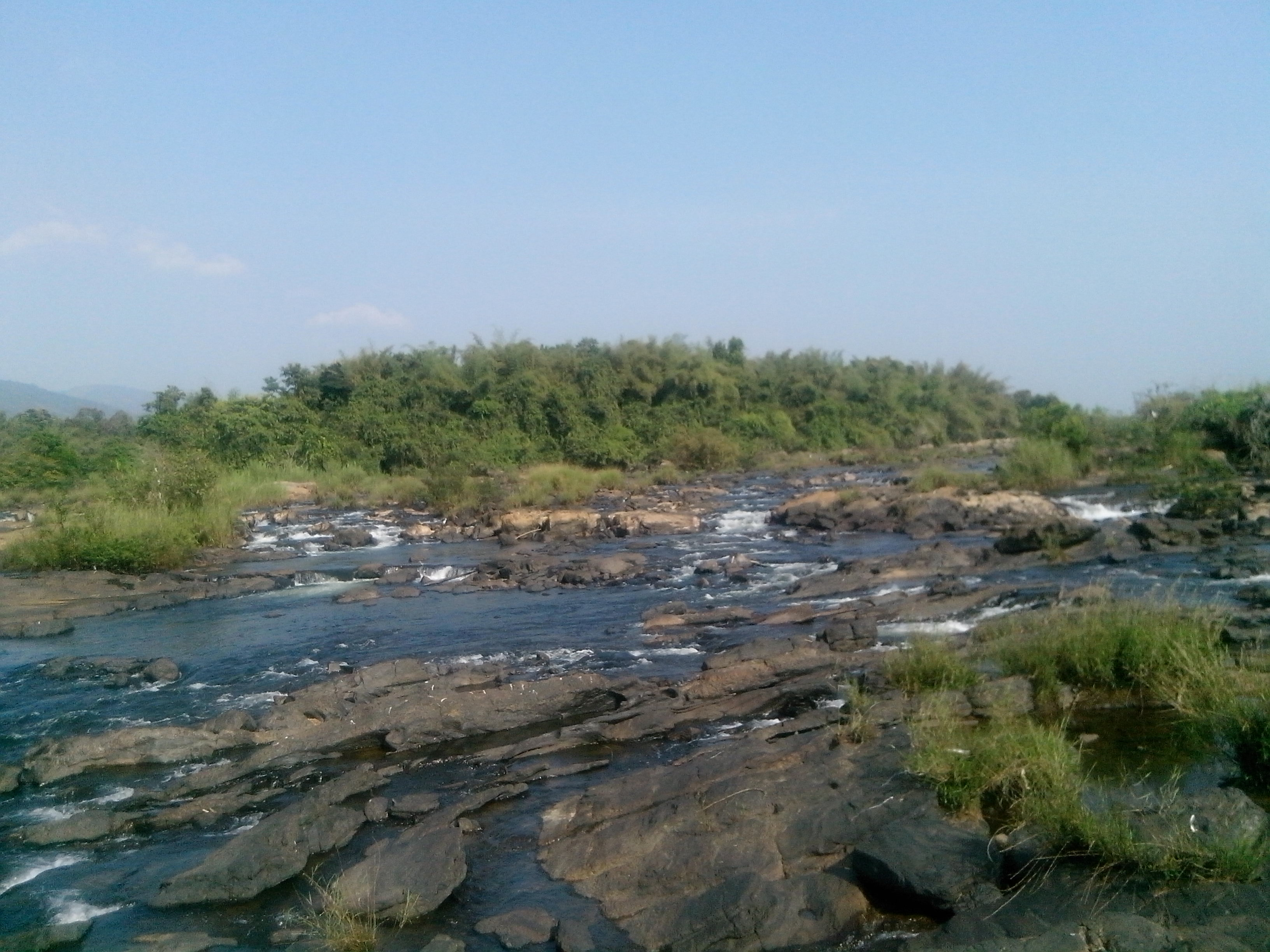

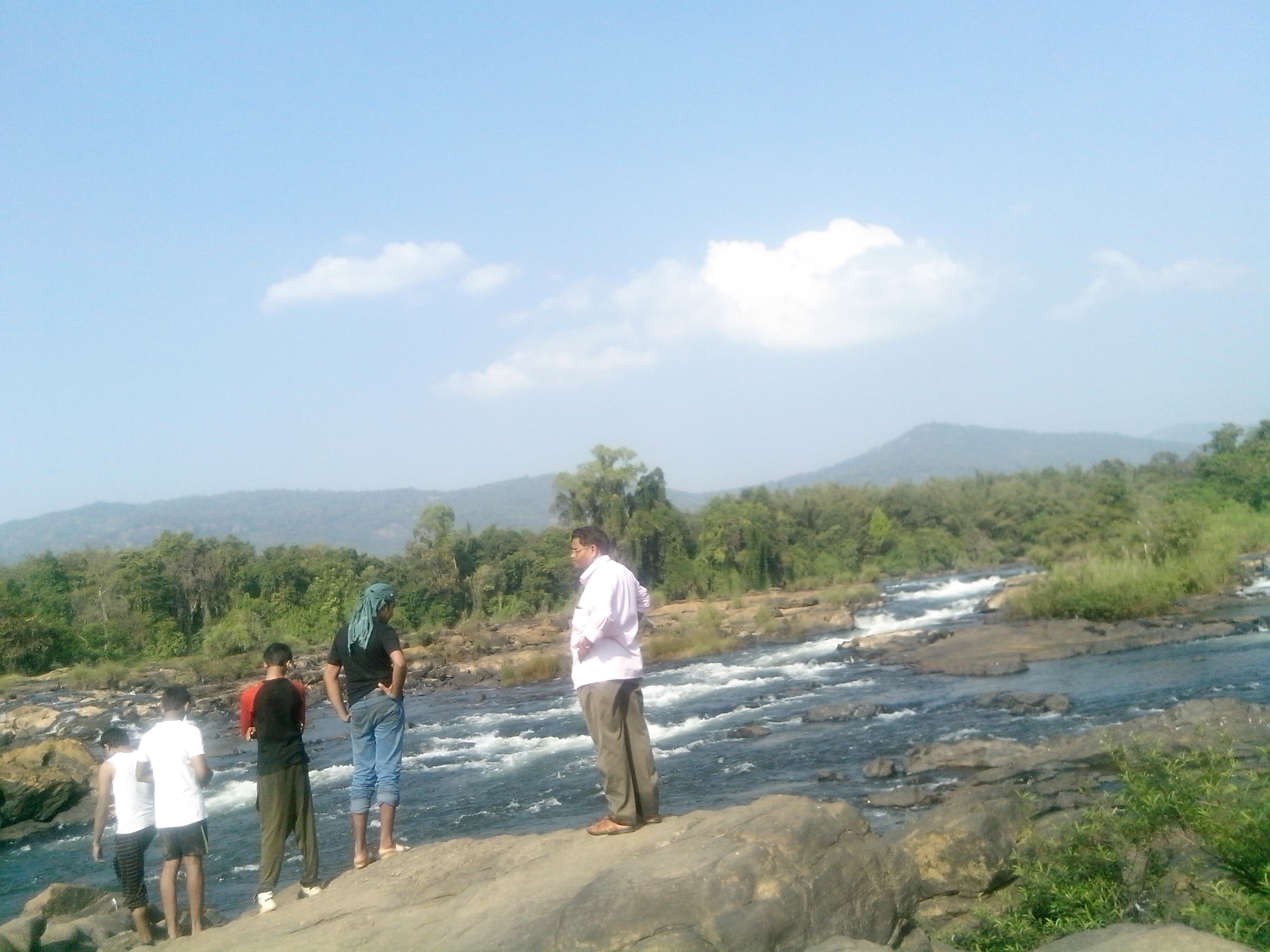

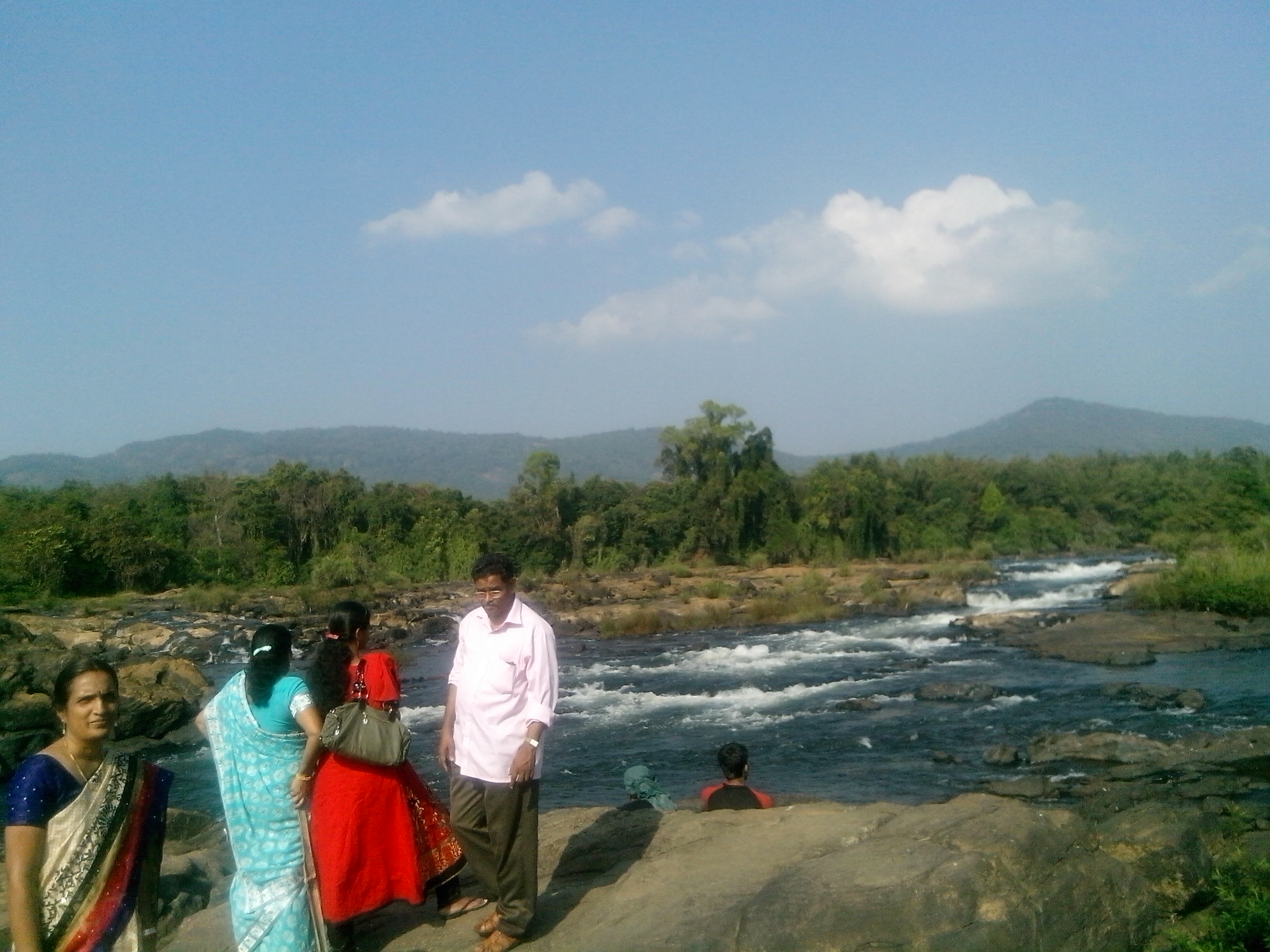

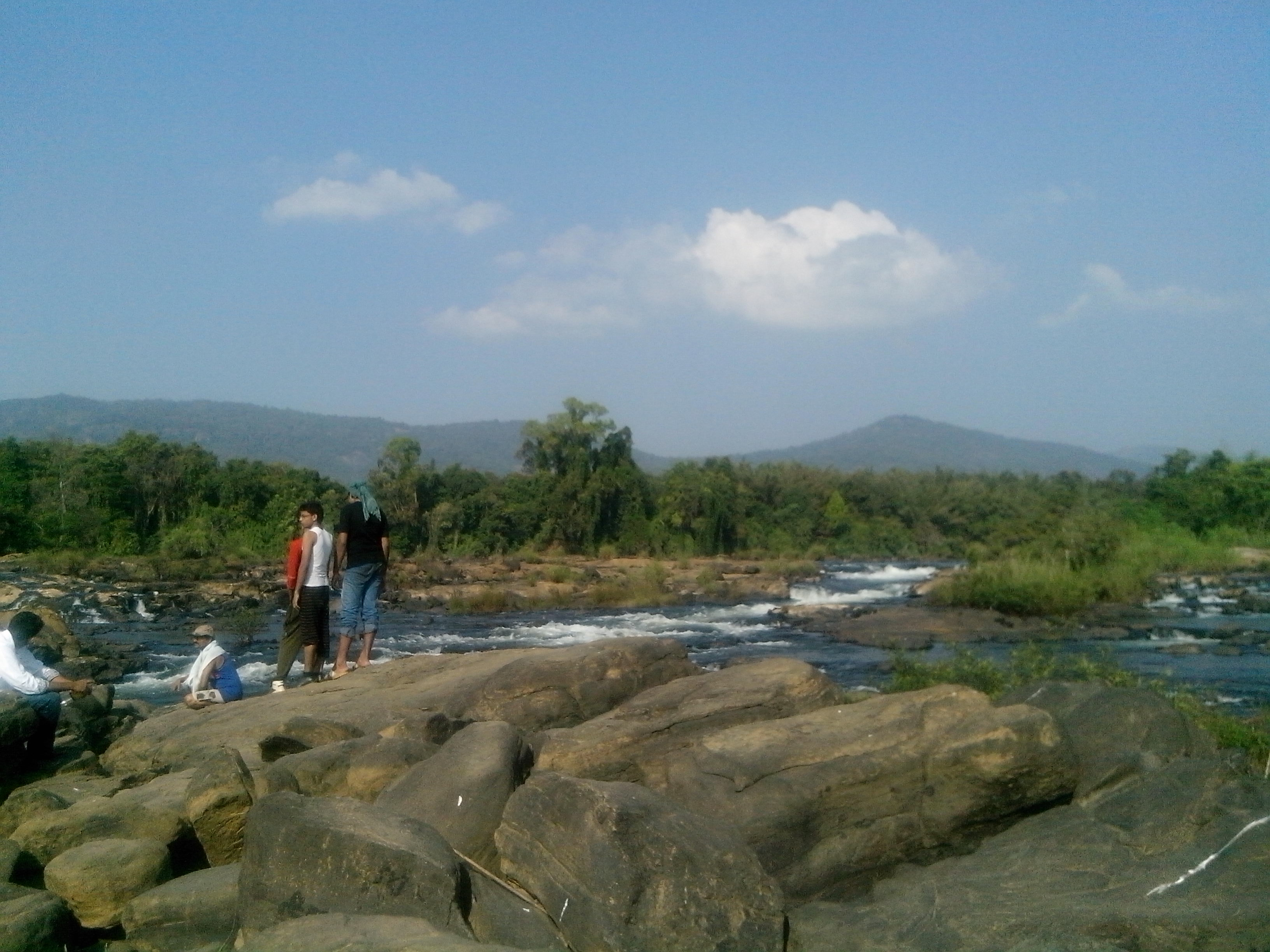
