= Senneri =

Coordinates: 12°42′N 80°03′E

Senneri is a small village in the Kanchipuram district of Tamil Nadu, India. It comes under Senneri Panchayath. It is located 41 km from the Kanchipuram, 42 km from the State capital Chennai and 10.5 km from district headquarters Chengalpattu. The landscape surrounding Senneri includes Chengalpattu Taluk, Thiruporur Taluk, St. Thomas Mount Taluk, and Sriperumbudur Taluk.

Nandivaram-Guduvancheri, Chengalpattu, Tirukalukundram, and Thirunindravur are the closest nearby cities to Senneri.

District: Chengalpattu
State: Tamil Nadu
Language: Tamil
Elevation/Altitude: 51 meters. Above sea level
Telephone Code/Std Code: 044
Pin Code: 603108
Post Office Name: Senneri
