= Rayamangalam, Kerala =

Rayamangalam
- village
- Interactive map of Rayamangalam
- Coordinates: 10.087854°N 76.508789°E
- Country: India
- State: Kerala
- District: Ernakulam

Population (2011)
  - Total: 27,537

Languages
  - Official: Malayalam, English
- Time zone: UTC+5:30 (IST)
- PIN: 683545
- Vehicle registration: KL-40
- Coastline: 0 kilometres (0 mi)
- Nearest city: perumbavoor
- Literacy: 100%%
- Lok Sabha constituency: Chalakkudy
- Climate: Tropical monsoon (Köppen)
- Avg. summer temperature: 35 °C (95 °F)
- Avg. winter temperature: 20 °C (68 °F)

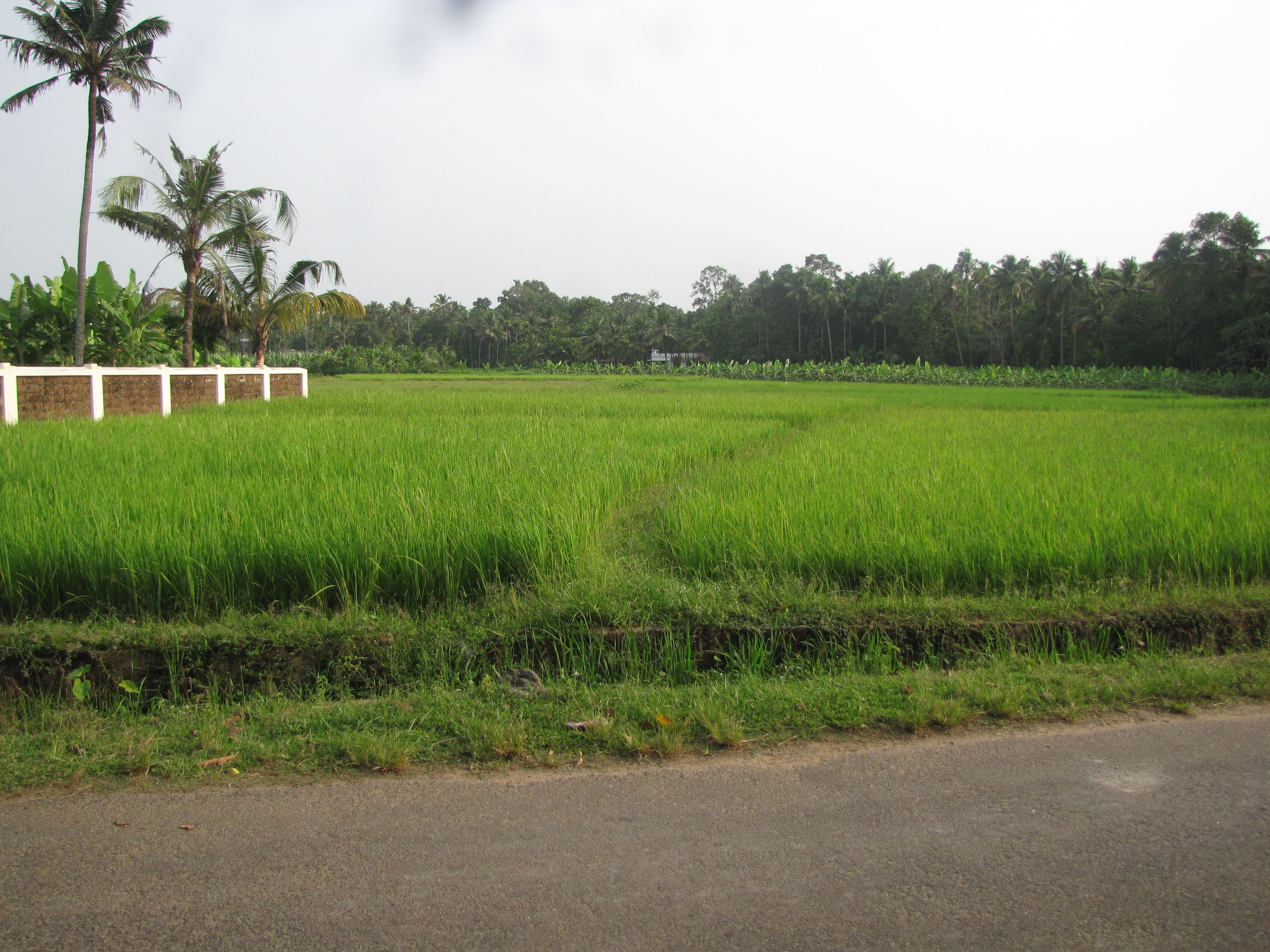
A Paddy Field

Rayamangalam is a village (Grama punchyathu) in the Ernakulam district of Kerala state, India.

== Location ==
Rayamangalam is close to the towns Kuruppampady Pulluvazhy.keezhillam.valayanchirangara. Perumbavoor, Muvattupuzha and Kothamangalam.

== Economy ==
Rayamangalam have a number of rock mining quarries and stone crushers. The surrounding hills are either planted with latex trees, or are being quarried. Another major activity is wood processing to produce plywood, matchsticks and other products. The Punchayath office is located at Nellimolam, on the Keezhillam- Kurichilakkodu road from Aluva Munnar Road (AM road).

== Transportation ==
The main roads passes through this punchayath are MC road and Aluva - Munnar (AM road). A canal, part of the Periyar Valley Irrigation Project, originates from the Periyar River at Boothankettu passes through the heart of the village. The Koottumadam Temple here is known for the Thaipooyam festival of Subrahmanyan, along with the nearby Temple of Siva Perakkattu. In terms of health care, there are two hospitals, and one Primary Health Center at Nellimolam.

== Kunnathnadu Tehsil ==
This village is part of Kunnathnadu taluk of Ernakulam district. Other towns in this area include Kizhakkambalam, Kombanad, Mazhuvannoor, Rayamangalam and thiruvaniyoor.

== Landmarks ==
- Peniel Bible Seminary And Missionary Training Centre
- JAYAKERALAM HIGHER SECONDARY SCHOOL PULLUVAZHY
- Govt.LP School Pulluvazhy
- Pulluvazhy Public Library
- St.Thomas School Pulluvazhy
- Koottumadom Sree Subramanya swami Temple
- Perakkattu Sree Mahadeva Temple
- Karur Mahavishnu Temple
- Moorukavu Bhagavathi Temple.
- Ponnidayi Siva Temple.
- St. Thomas Catholic Church Pulluvazhy
- St. Antony's Chapel and Sr Rany Maria Museum.
- St. Thomas Jacobite Syrian church Parethumukal
- st.Marys Jacobite syrian church nellimolam
- Jerusalem St. Peter's chapel Vaikara
- Gvt. UP School Vaikara
- Ramapurath are Krishna swami Temple Vaikara
- Kunnathussery sree krishna Temple Valayanchirangara

== Population ==
According to the 2011 census of India, Rayamangalam has 6947 households. The literacy rate of the village is 88.34%.

Demographics (2011 Census)
	Total	Male	Female
Population	27537	13592	13945
Children aged below 6 years	2315	1184	1131
Scheduled caste	3053	1485	1568
Scheduled tribe	36	18	18
Literates	24327	12135	12192
Workers (all)	10858	7621	3237
Main workers (total)	8528	6397	2131
Main workers: Cultivators	791	673	118
Main workers: Agricultural labourers	679	442	237
Main workers: Household industry workers	186	141	45
Main workers: Other	6872	5141	1731
Marginal workers (total)	2330	1224	1106
Marginal workers: Cultivators	227	147	80
Marginal workers: Agricultural labourers	501	248	253
Marginal workers: Household industry workers	107	69	38
Marginal workers: Others	1495	760	735
Non-workers	16679	5971	10708
