= Venu (given name) =

Venu is an Indian masculine given name. Notable people with this name include:

- K. Venu (Kerala), Naxalite leader from Kerala
- K. Venu (Tamil Nadu politician), Indian politician
- Kurma Venu Gopalaswamy, Indian lawyer
- Master Venu, Indian composer
- Nedumudi Venu, Indian actor
- Nerella Venu Madhav, Indian ventriloquist
- P. Venu, Indian film director
- Venu Arvind, Tamil actor
- Venu, Indian cinematographer
- Venu Madhav (actor), Indian comedian
- Venu Nagavally, Indian actor
- Venu Nair, Indian film director
- Venu Ravichandran, Indian film producer
- Venu Srinivasan, Indian businessman
- Venu Thottempudi, an Indian Actor
- Venu V. Desom, Malayalam poet
