= Edayappuram =

- village
- Location in Kerala, India Edayappuram (India)
- Coordinates: 10.100878°N 76.371329°E
- Country: India
- State: Kerala
- District: Ernakulam

Population (2001)
  - Total: 28,607

Languages
  - Official: Malayalam, English
- Time zone: UTC+5:30 (IST)
- PIN: 683101
- Telephone code: 0484
- Vehicle registration: KL-41
- Nearest city: Aluva
- Lok Sabha constituency: Chalakkudy
- Climate: Moderate (Köppen)

Edayappuram is a small village in Aluva Taluk, Ernakulam district in the Indian state of Kerala and located at a distance of 3 km from Aluva town and 16 km from Perumbavoor.

== Transportation ==
Kerala State Road Transport Corporation (KSRTC) and some of the private buses operates regular services through this area.

== Geography ==
Edayappuram is surrounded by green foliage and paddy fields. Fertile land of Edayappuram is suitable for all crops include rice, rubber, and coconut. Proximity of Periyar River, the lifeline of Kerala makes this land fertile.

== Demographics ==
At the 2001 census, Edayappuram had a population of 28,607. The majority of people living in Edayappuram are Muslim and Hindus although there is also a Christian minority population living there too.

== Important Places ==
Erumathal L P School, KMC English Medium High School, SNDP Library, Akshaya E Centre Edayappuram, Keezhmad Service Co Operative Society, Edayappuram Health Centre, Kolattukavu Bhagavathi Temple, Edayappuram Jumua Masjid.
