= Gopalaswamy =

Gopalaswamy may refer to:

== People ==
- Gopalaswamy Kasturirangan (1930–2020), Indian cricketer
- Gopalaswamy Mahendraraja (1956–1994), Sri Lankan rebel
- Kurma Venu Gopalaswamy (1903–1983), Indian advocate
- Lakshmi Gopalaswamy, Indian actress

== Other uses ==
- Gopalaswamy Hills, hill in Indiis
