= Aluva Mahadeva Temple =

Shiva Temple, Kochi, Kerala, India

Aluva Siva Temple
- ആലുവ ശിവക്ഷേത്രം
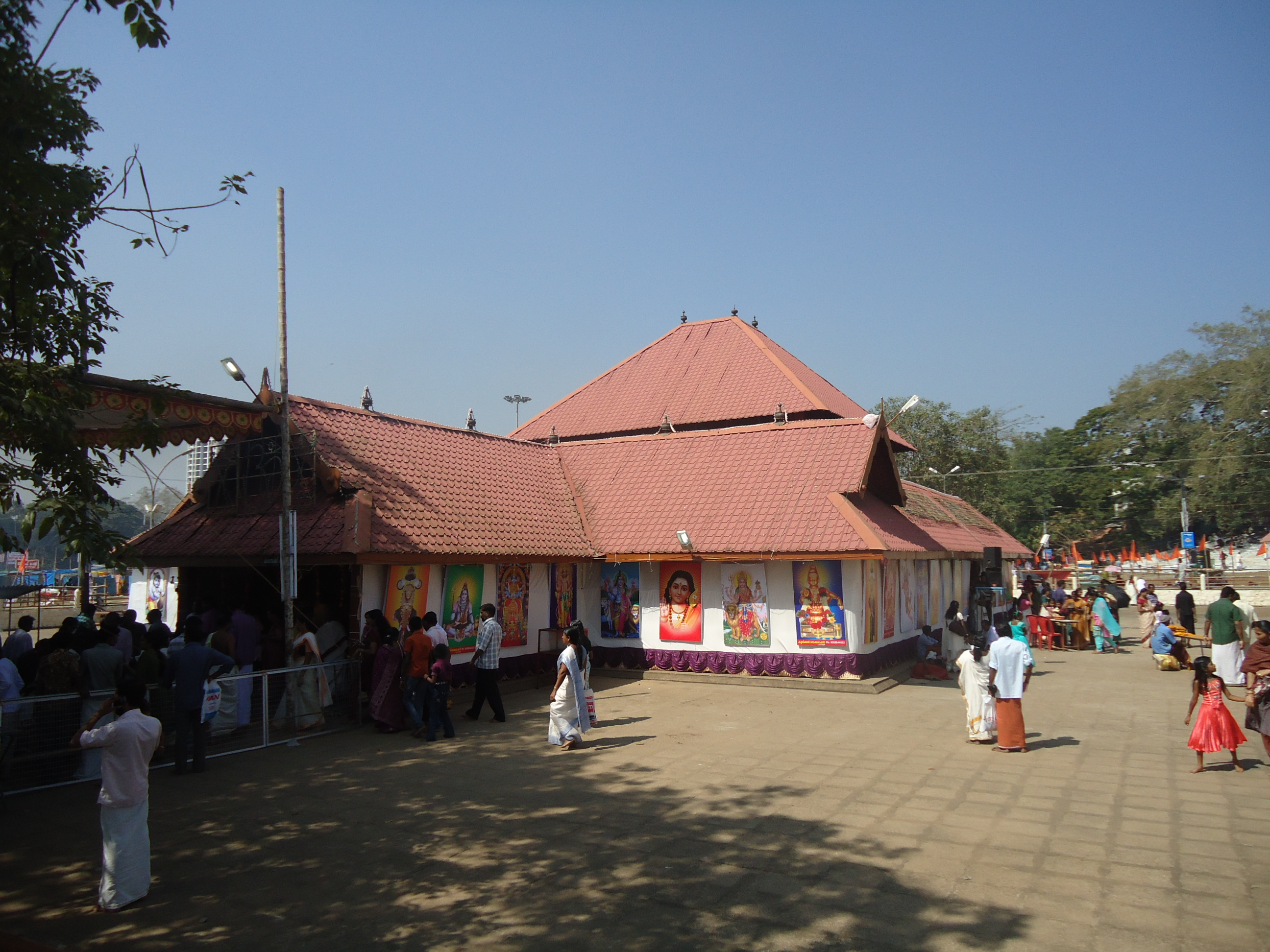
- Temple and Temple Pond

- Mahadeva Temple, Aluva, Ernakulam, Kerala

Religion
- Affiliation: Hinduism
- District: Ernakulam
- Deity: Shiva
- Festival: Aluva Sivarathri festival
- Governing body: Travancore Devaswom Board

Location
- Location: Periyar
- State: Kerala
- Country: India
- Interactive map of Aluva Siva Temple
- Coordinates: 10°07′00.2″N 76°21′16.7″E

Architecture
- Type: Kerala style
- Creator: Parashurama
- Completed: Not known

Specifications
- Temple: 1
- Elevation: 19.37 m (64 ft)

Aluva Mahadeva Temple is an ancient Hindu temple dedicated to Shiva, and situated on the bank of the Periyar River at Aluva manappuram in suburban Kochi. The presiding deity of the temple is Lord Shiva, located in the main Sanctum Sanctorum, facing east. According to folklore, sage Parashurama had installed the idol. It is the part of the 108 Shiva Temples of Kerala. The temple is mostly known for the Aluva Sivarathri festival.

The Shiva linga is not enshrined in a Sreekovil; it rises out of the sand banks of the Periyar river. The land on which the sand banks are located is called the Aluva Manal Puram (Aluva Sand Banks).
