= Aluva Sivarathri festival =

Annual festival celebrated in Aluva Siva temple

Aluva Sivarathri Manappuram Festival
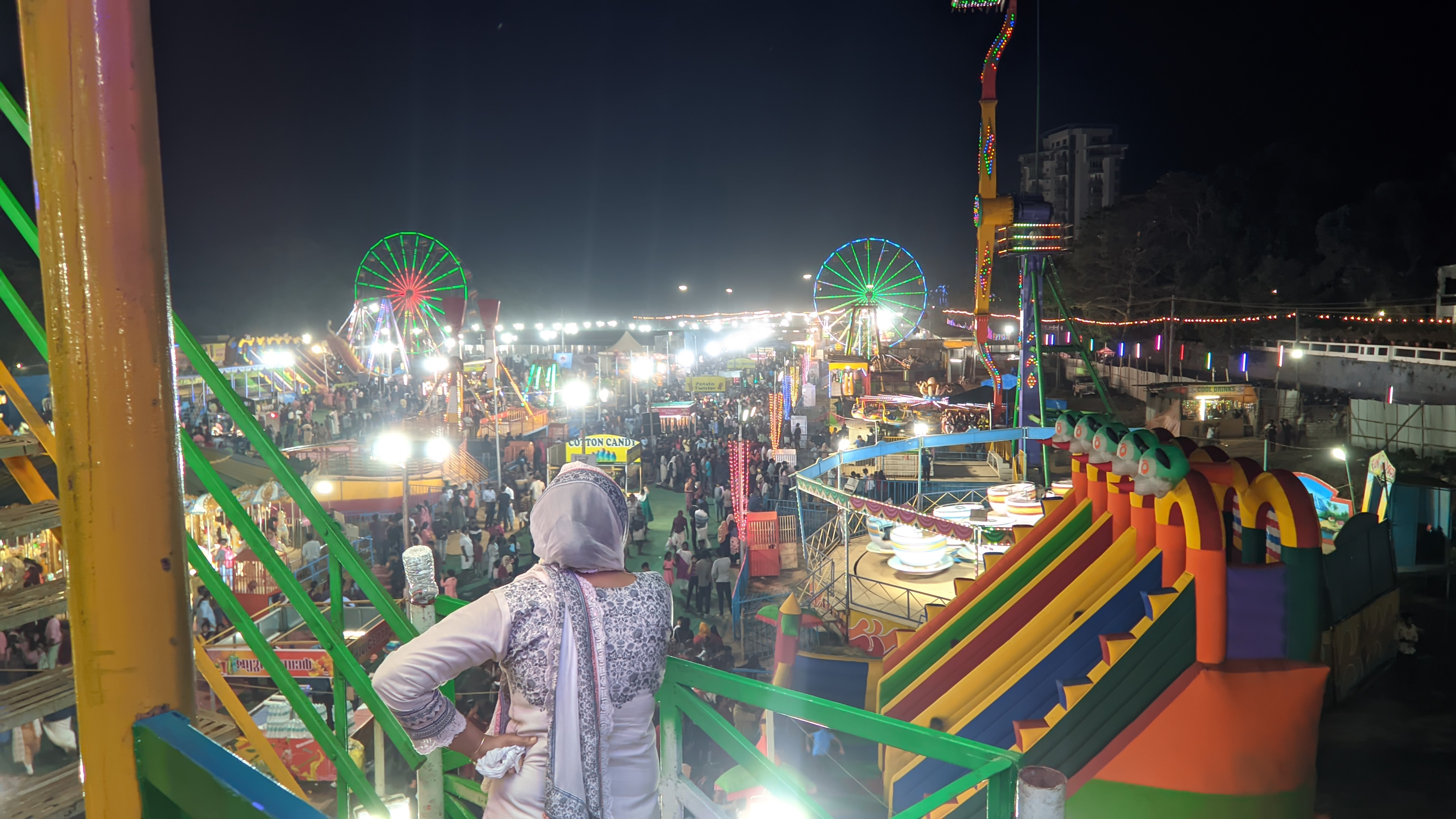
- A night view of Aluva Sivaratri Festival
- Observed by: Hindus of Kerala
- Type: Religious, cultural
- Date: per Hindu calendar
- Frequency: Annual

Aluva Sivarathri Festival is the Sivarathri celebrated in Aluva Mahadeva Temple in Aluva, Kochi in the state of Kerala, India The celebration of Sivarathri in Aluva is very famous in Kerala. The month of Kumbham is noted for the Sivarathri festival which falls in February – March.

Aluva Sivarathri is celebrated at the Siva temple on the banks of Periyar River and this place is called the Aluva Manal Puram (land with sand). Pilgrims offer Bali (sacrifice) to their ancestors in the morning succeeding the holy night. Near the bank of periyar, Aluva Manal Puram (also called Manappuram), there will be many stalls installed for people for purchasing, shopping, exhibitions, and adventure rides for children and adults. People from all religions becomes the part of the festival. It will remain for two weeks after the offerings of Bali. The festival is celebrated as a remembrance for the lord Shiva.

== Gallery ==
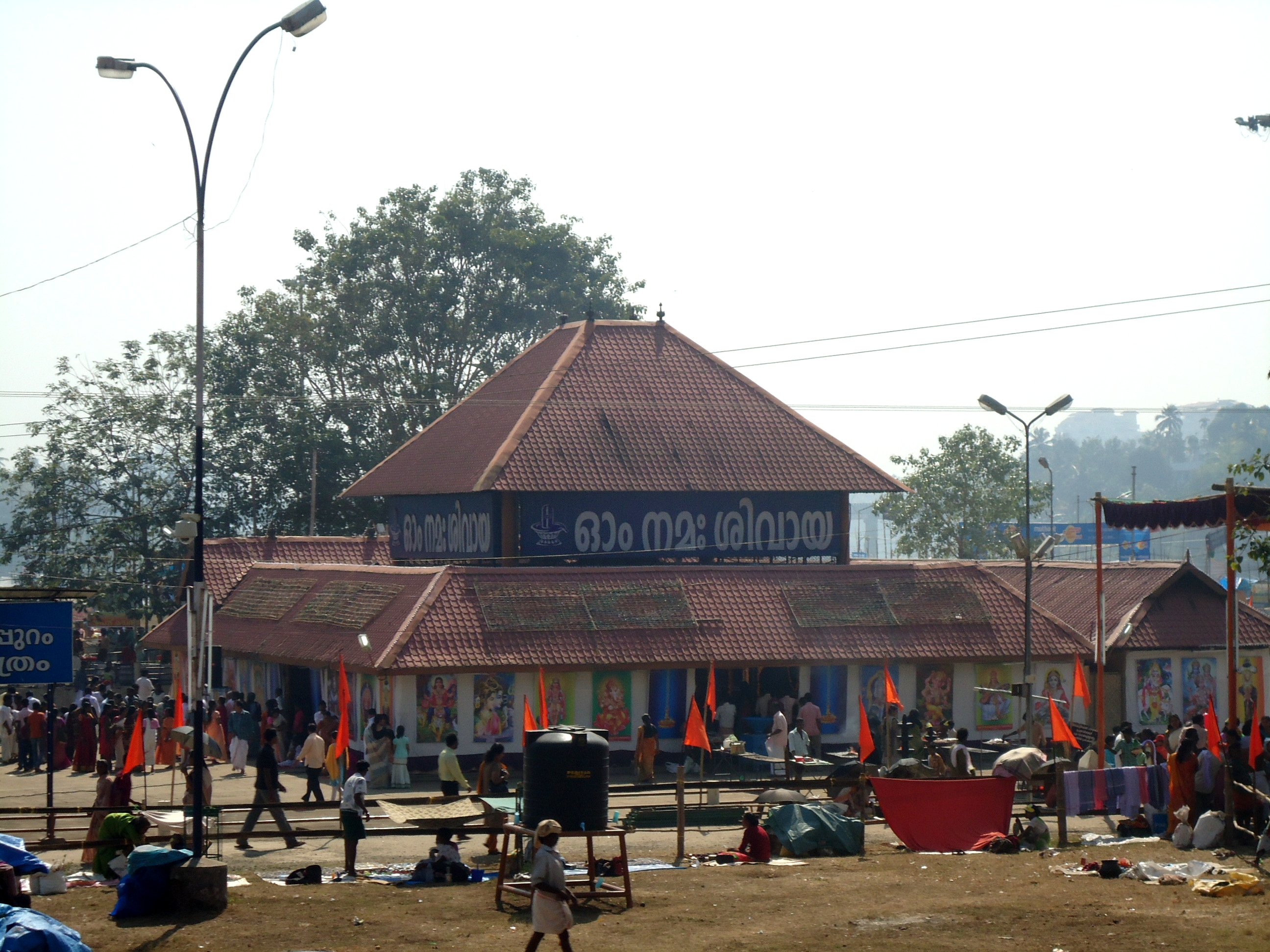
Siva Temple at Aluva Manal Puram

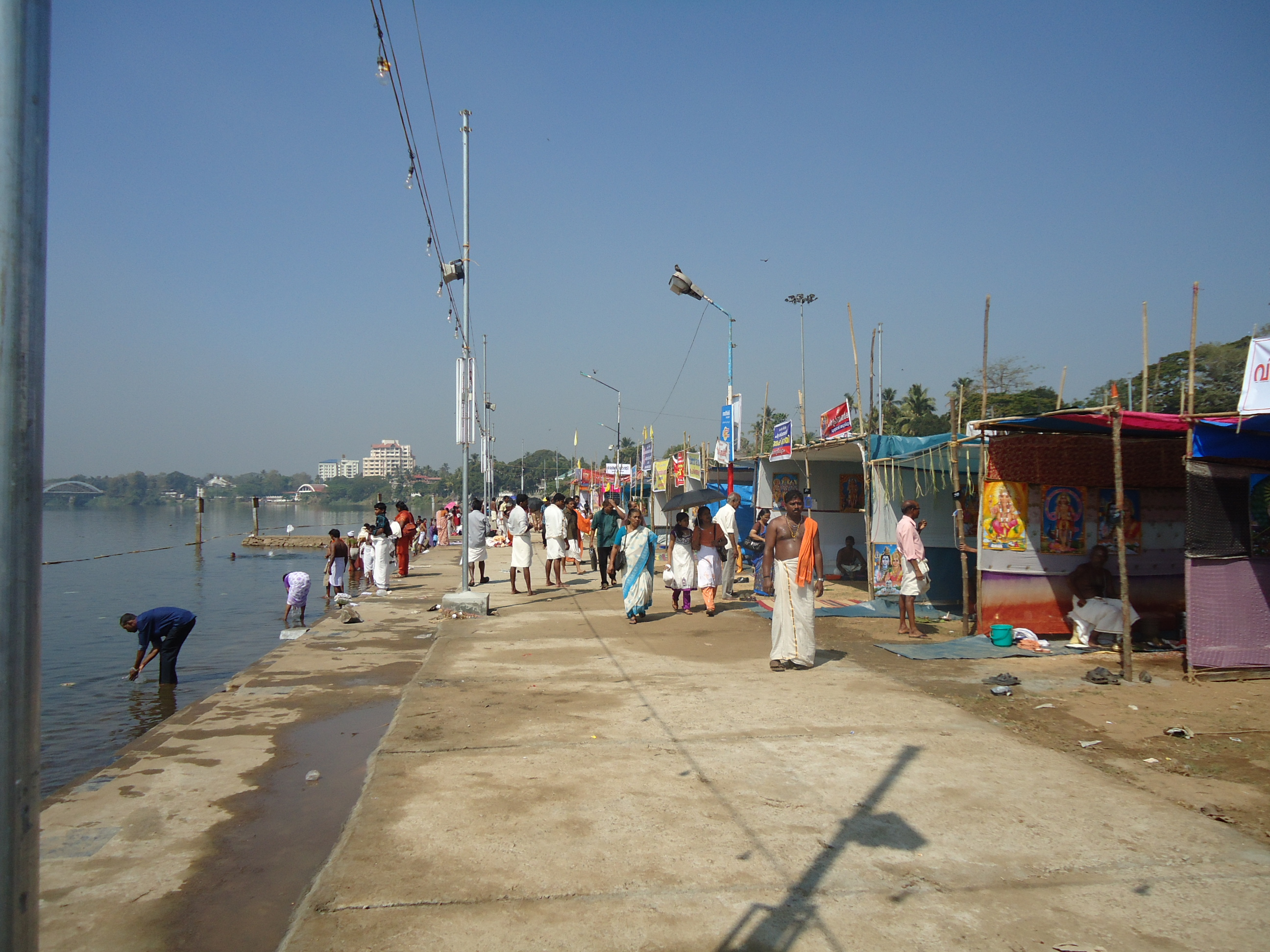
Aluva Sivarathri Bali at Aluva Manal Puram

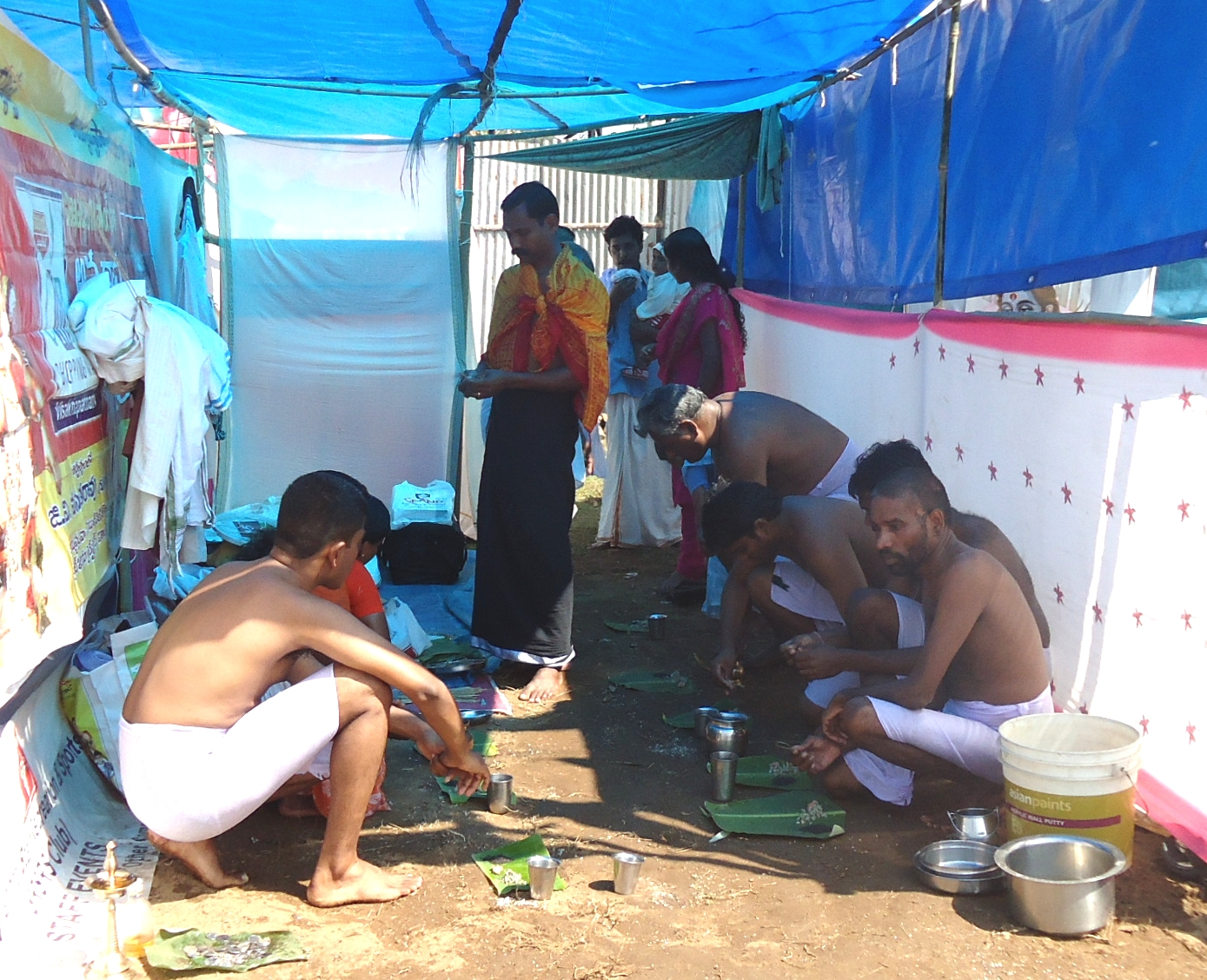
Sivarathri Balitharppanam Proceedings

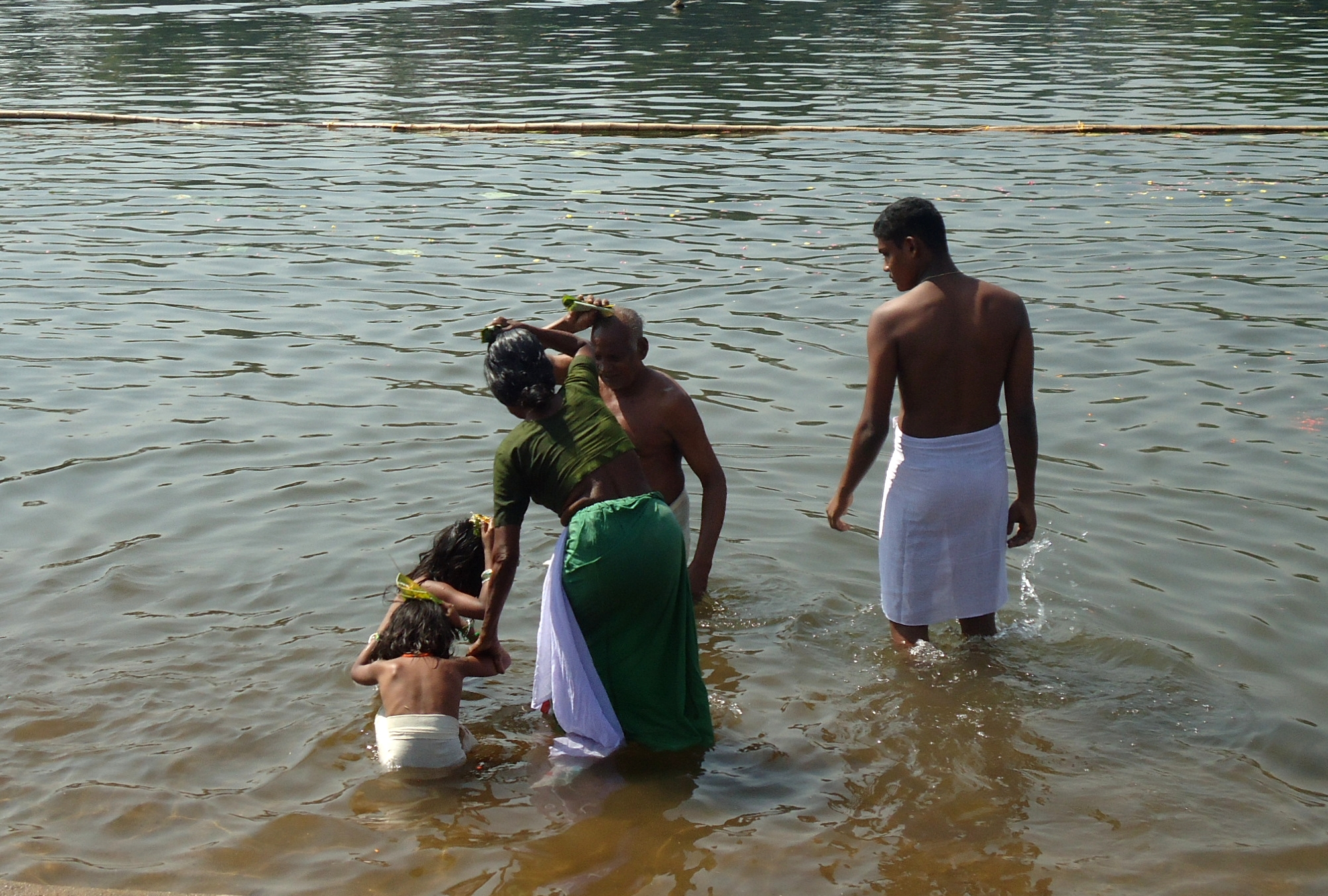
Bath after proceedings

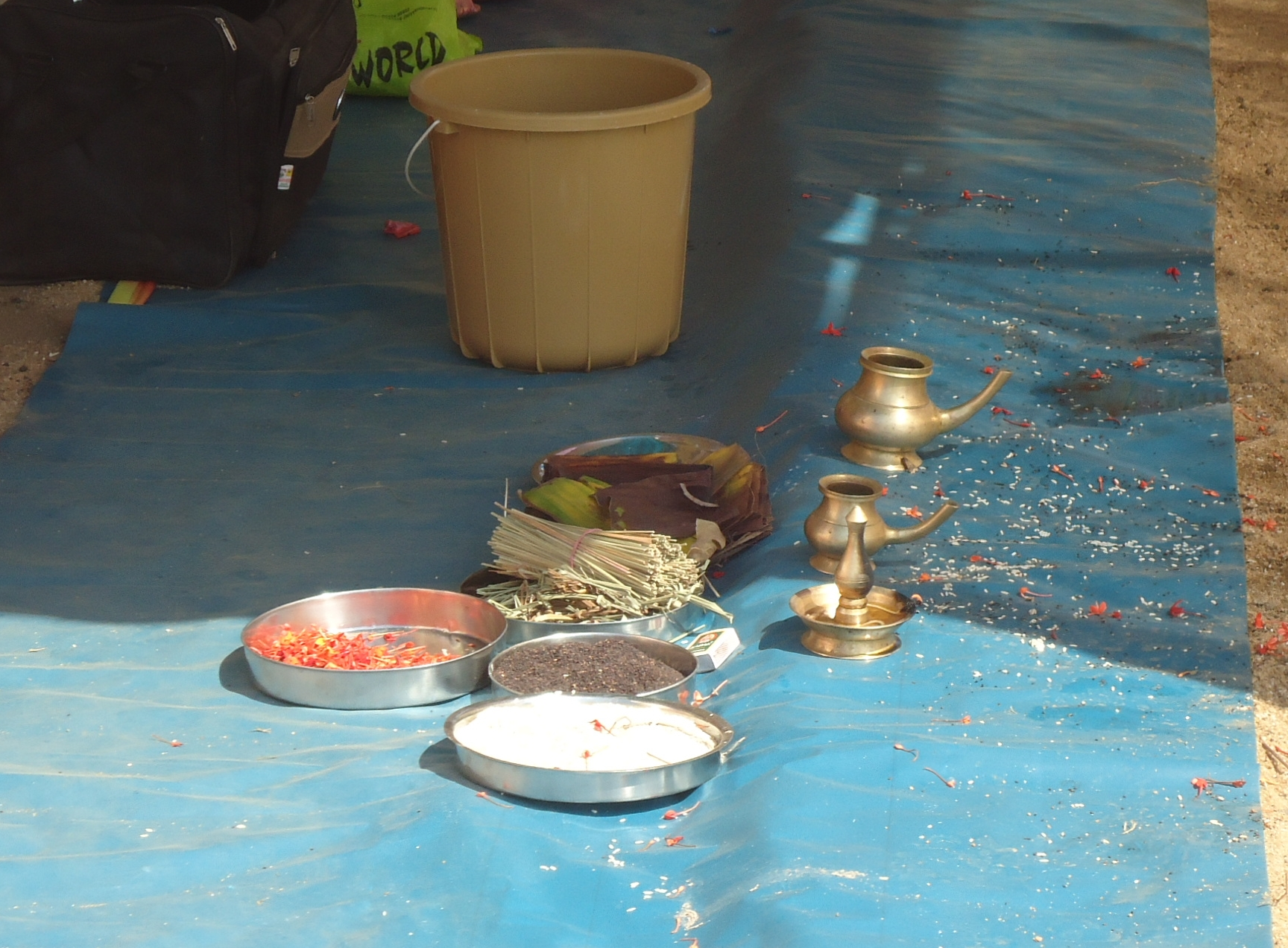
things used for the proceedings of Bali
