= Aluva =

Municipality in Kerala, India

Aluva Alwaye (colonial name)
- Municipality In Kochi
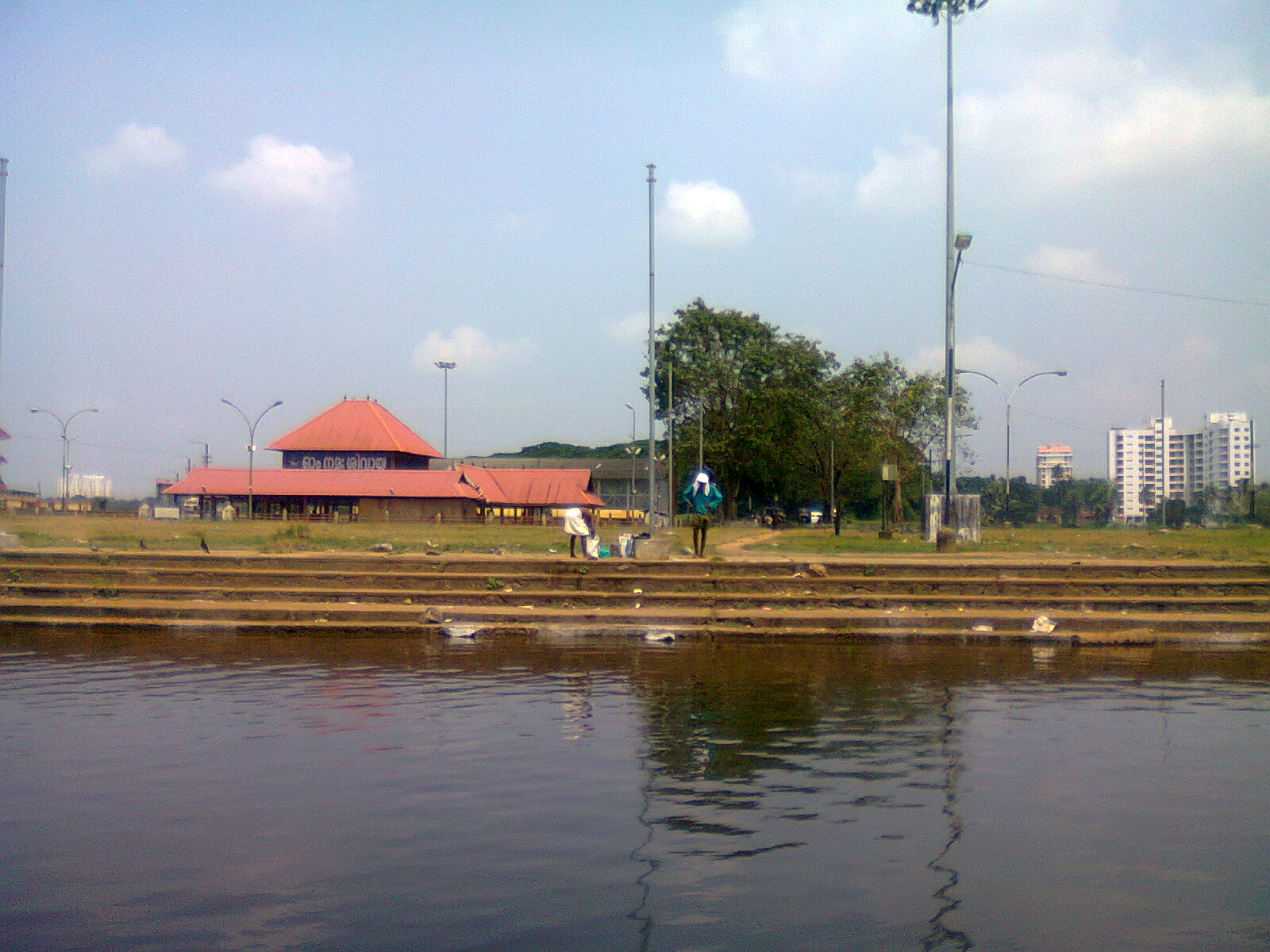
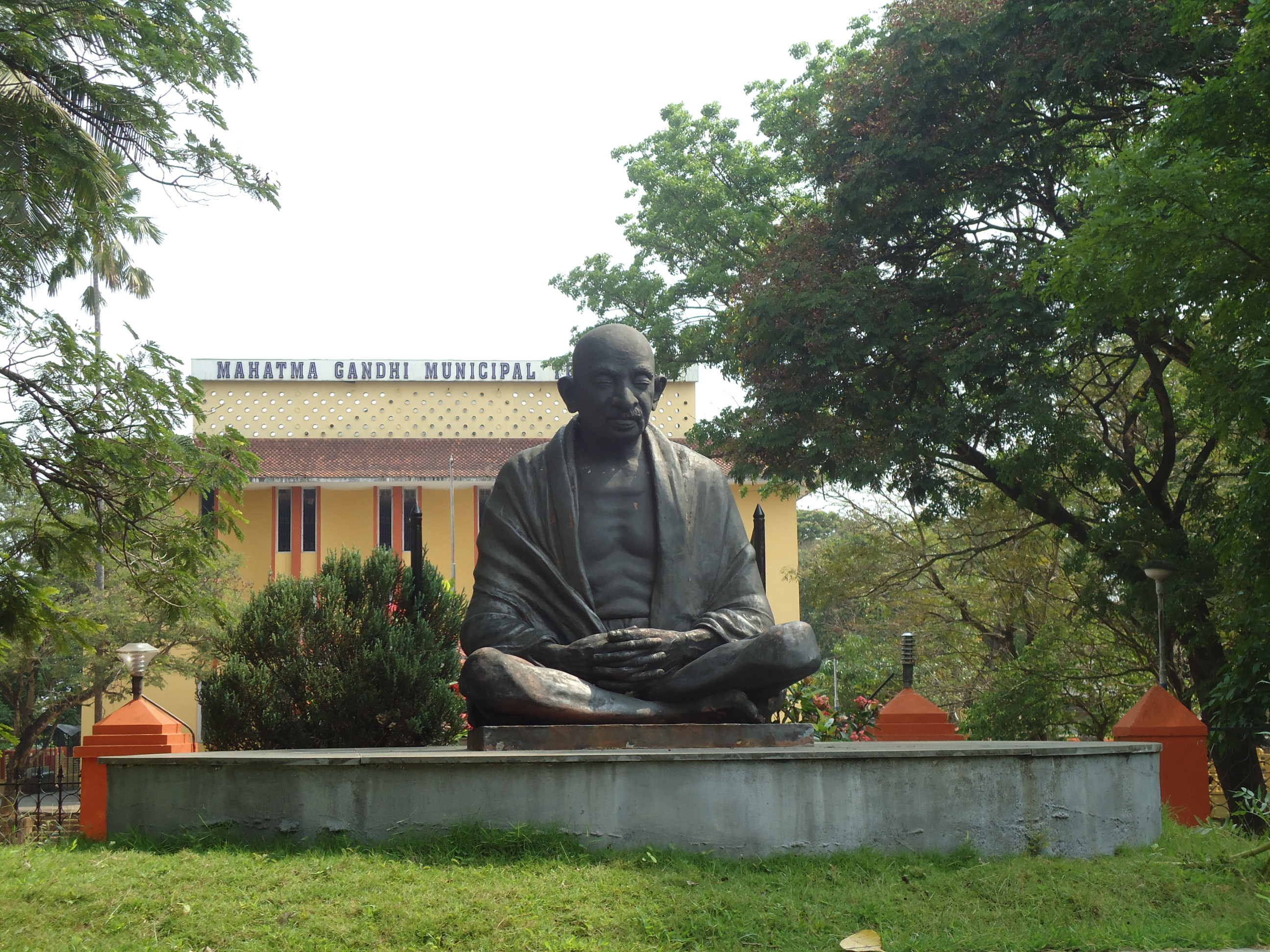
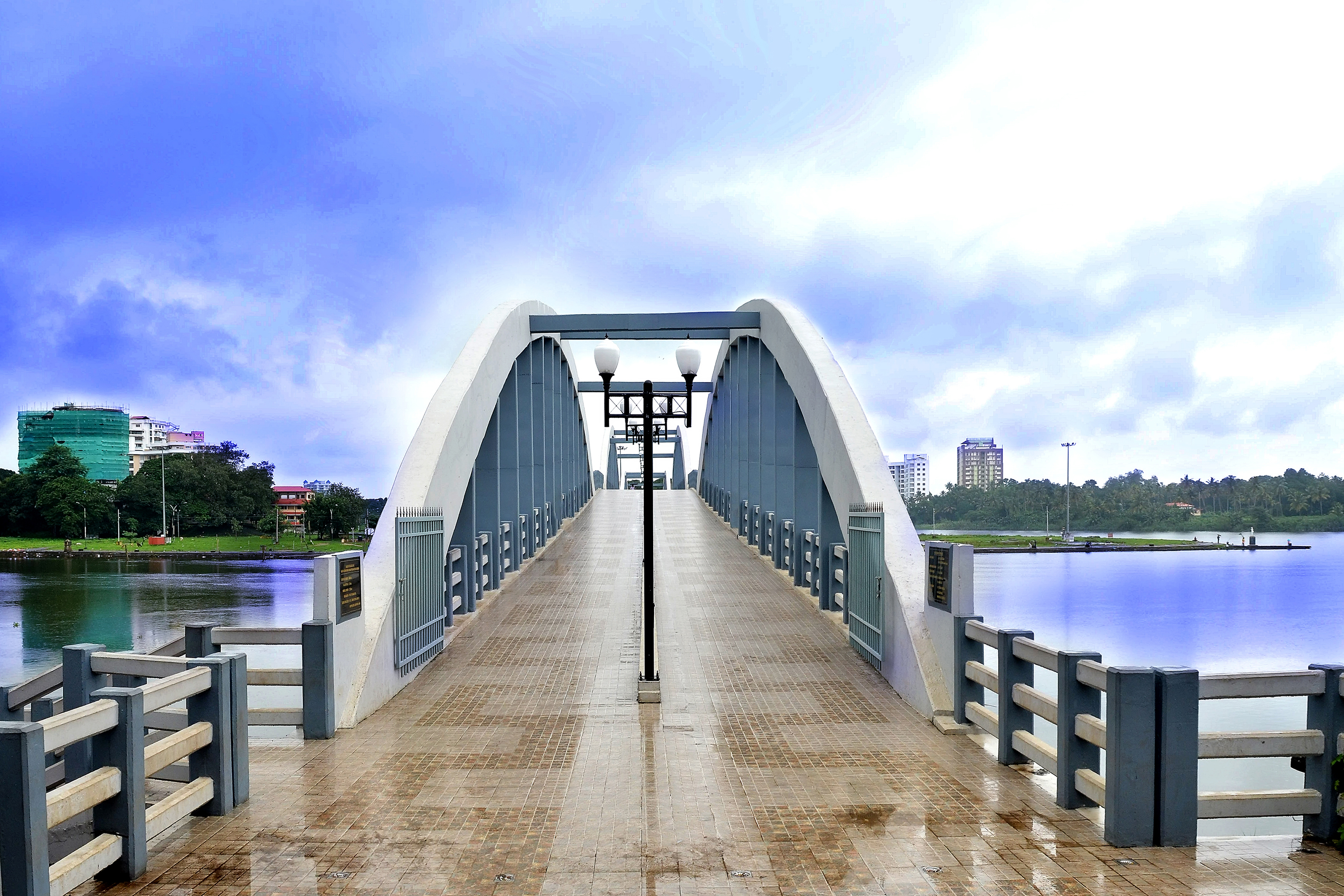
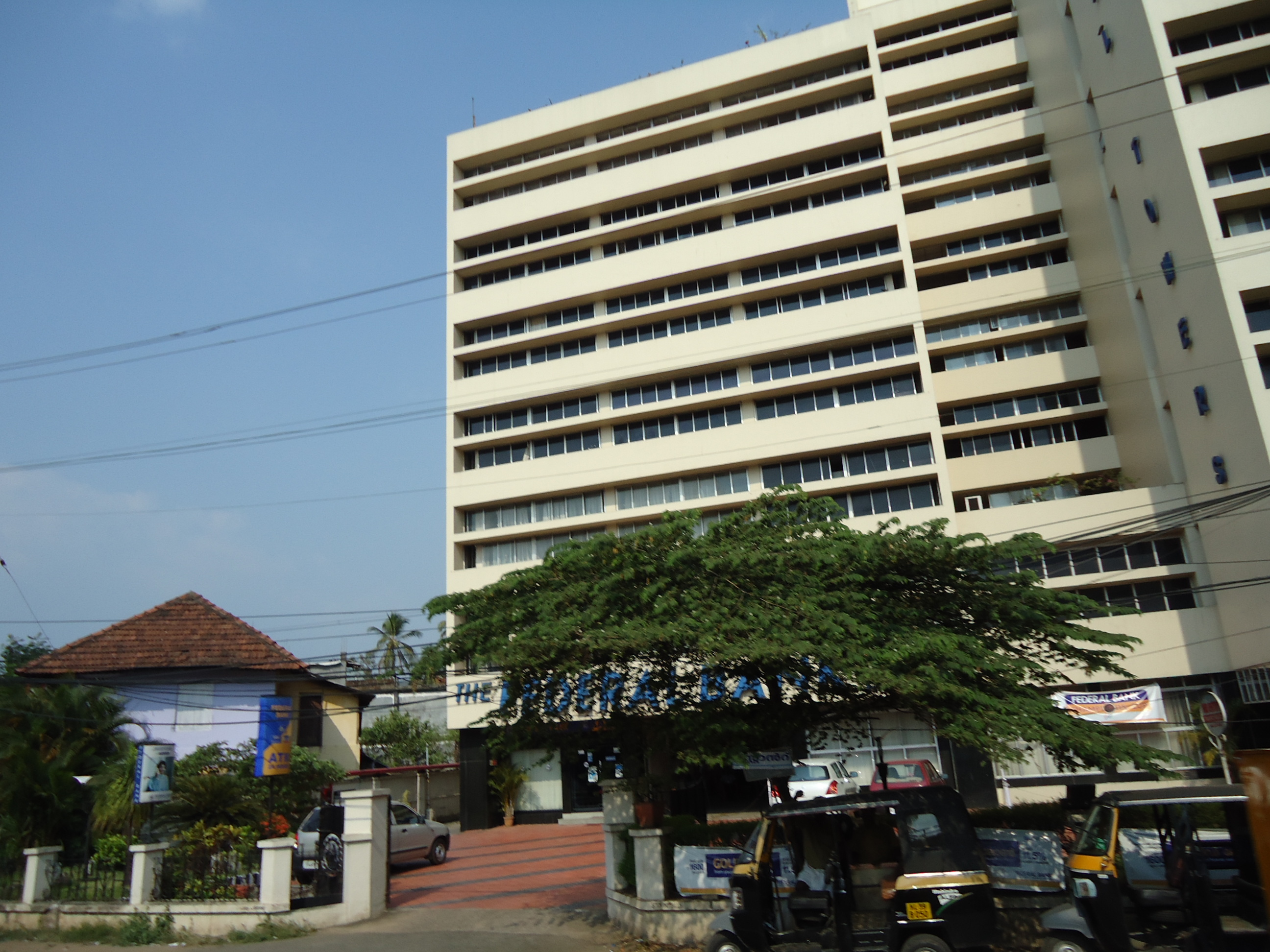
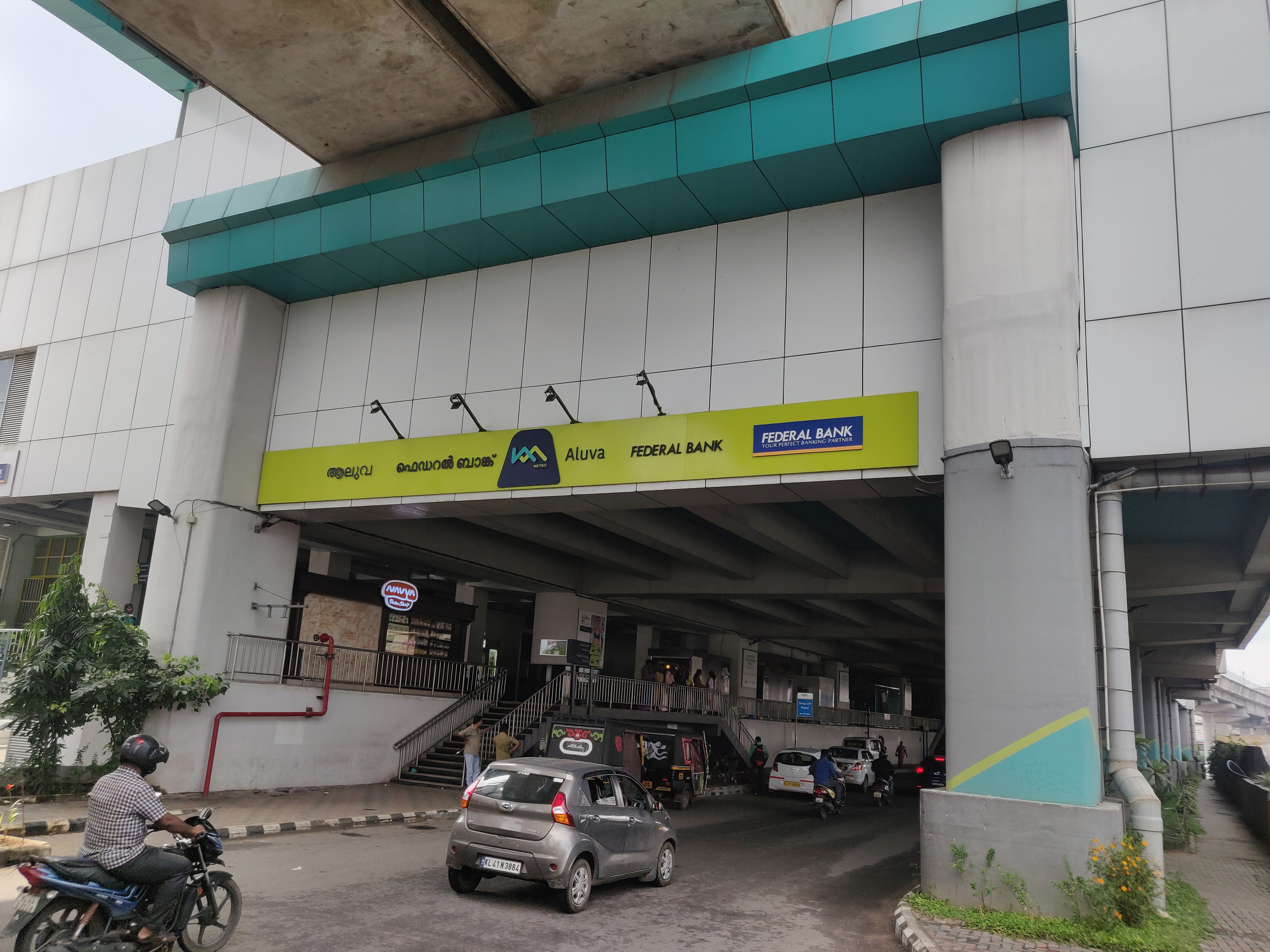
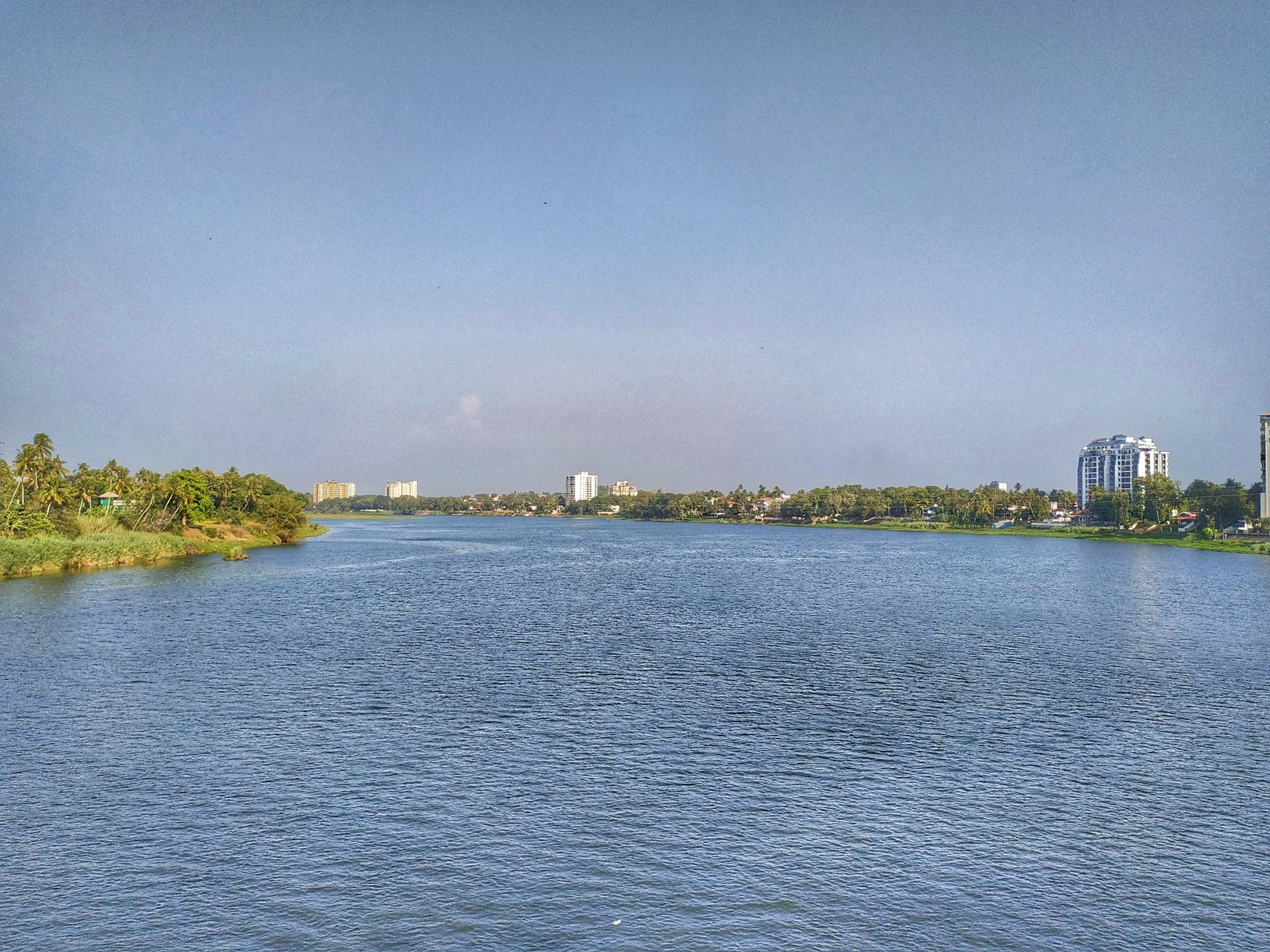
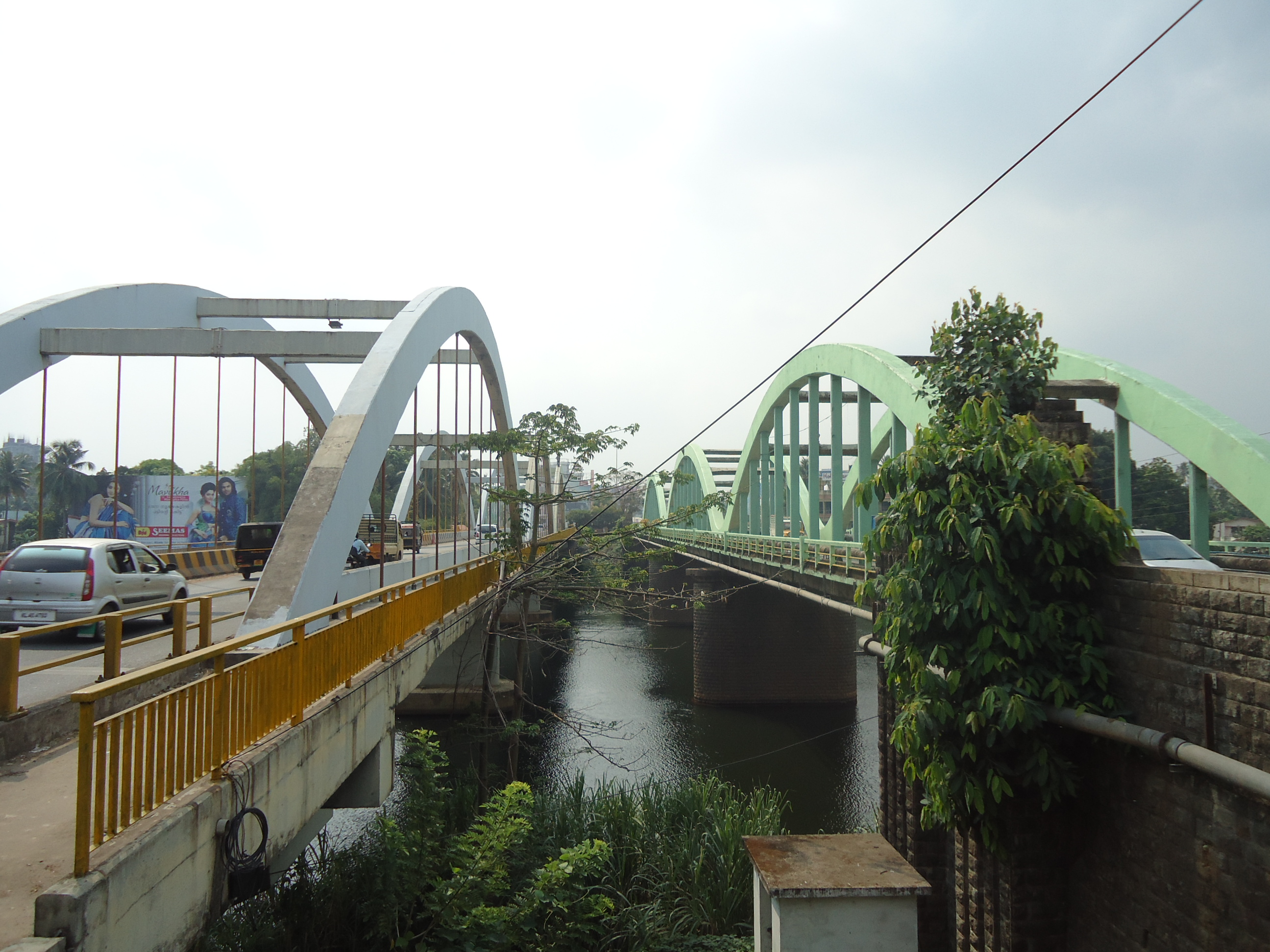
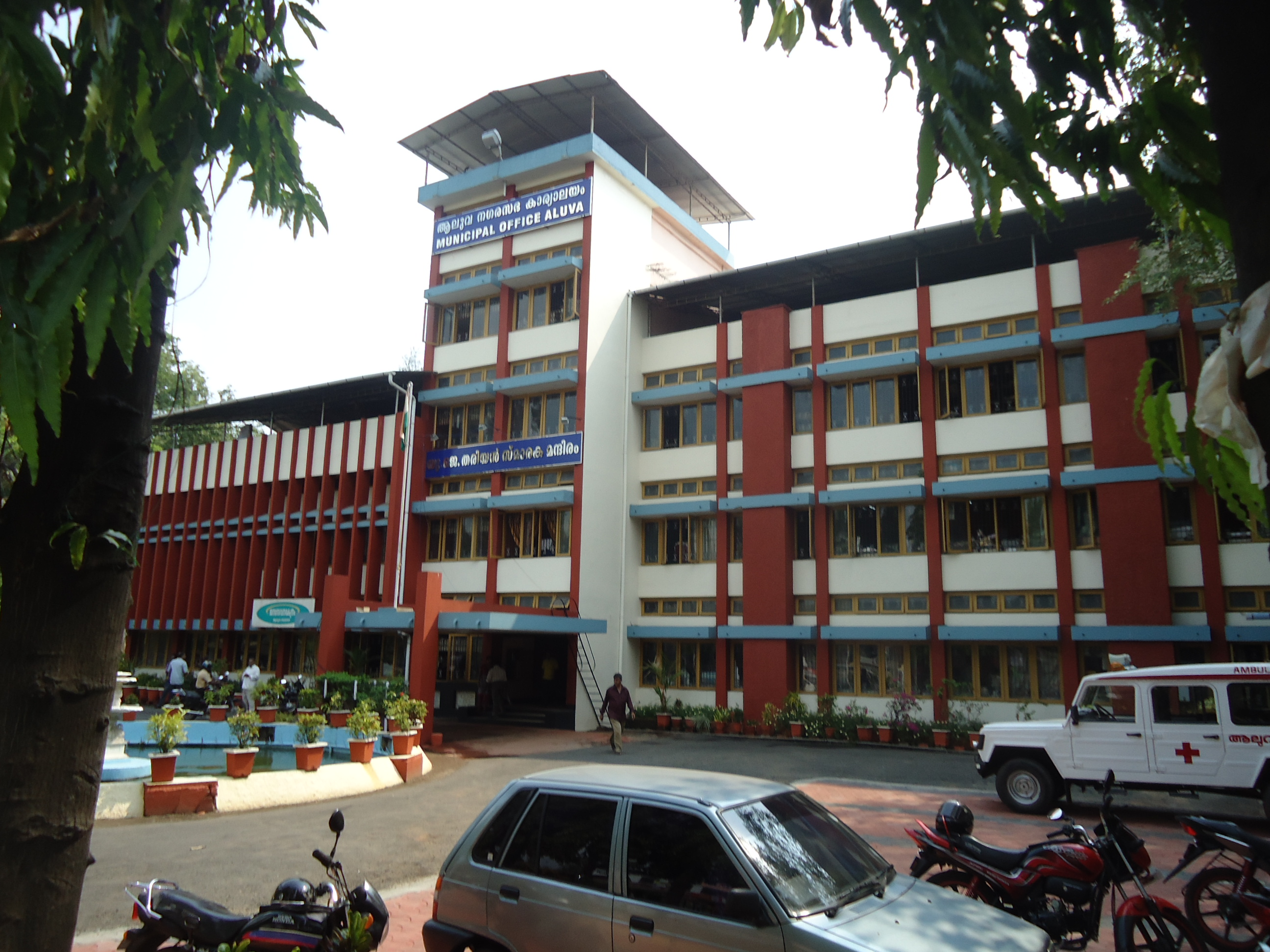
- Clockwise from top: Mahadeva Temple; New Bridge; Aluva metro station; Marthandavarma Bridge; Municipal Office; Periyar river; Federal Bank Headquarters; Gandhi Statue

- Location in Kerala, India Aluva (India)
- Coordinates: 10.1167°N 76.3500°E
- Country: India
- State: Kerala
- District: Ernakulam
- Established: 1921

Government
  - Type: Municipality
  - Body: Aluva Municipality
  - Chairperson: Saiji Jolly (Indian National Congress)
  - Deputy chairperson: TBD

Area
  - Total: 7.18 km^{2} (2.77 sq mi)
- Elevation: 8 m (26 ft)

Population (2011)
  - Total: 22,428
  - Density: 3,358/km^{2} (8,700/sq mi)

Languages
  - Official: Malayalam, English
- Time zone: UTC+5:30 (IST)
- PIN: 6831xx
- Telephone code: 0484
- Vehicle registration: KL 41
- Sex ratio: 1000:1050 ♂/♀
- Website: aluvamunicipality.lsgkerala.gov.in/en

Aluva (Malayalam pronunciation: [ɐːluʋɐ]), formerly known as Alwaye, is a major town and municipality in the northern part of the Kochi metropolitan area in the Indian state of Kerala. Situated on the banks of the Periyar River, it serves as an important residential, commercial, and transportation hub in Ernakulam district and is the administrative headquarters of Aluva taluk. Located northeast of central Kochi, Aluva has long been recognized as a gateway between Kochi and central Kerala.

Aluva is noted for its cultural, religious, and historical significance. It is best known for the annual Aluva Sivarathri festival, one of Kerala’s largest religious gatherings, held on the sandbanks of the Periyar River. It is also closely associated with Sree Narayana Guru, who founded the Advaita Ashram in Aluva in 1913, establishing the town as an important centre of social reform and spiritual thought. Historically, Aluva developed as a prominent settlement along the Periyar River and grew into a centre for trade, education, and industry.

Aluva also serves as the administrative centre of the Aluva taluk. In 1956, the taluks of villages—including Mukundapuram, Kanayannur, Kunathunad, and North Paravur—were combined to form the Aluva taluk. Despite being part of the Kochi urban agglomeration, Aluva continues to function as an autonomous municipality and remains one of the most significant urban centres in Kerala. The headquarters of the District Police Chief of the Ernakulam Rural Police District, the Superintending Engineer of PWD (Roads), and the District Educational Officer are also located there. Additionally, Aluva is the northern starting point of the Kochi Metro rail’s first phase, which began operations in June 2017.

== Etymology ==
The etymology of the town’s name has been the subject of speculation for centuries. One widely accepted version relates to the legend of the Hindu god Shiva drinking the Kalakootam poison to save the world. It is said that, with the poison (alam) held in his mouth (vaa), Shiva was transformed into a deity who later resided in a temple in Aluva. The Sivarathri festival is celebrated in his honour. Some leaflets and websites still refer to the town by its colonial name, Alwaye.

== History ==
Archaeological evidence indicates that settlements existed in Aluva as early as 250 BC. Until 1341 CE, Aluva comprised a continuous area of land spanning Kakkanad and Alangad. By that time, the town was densely populated and had become both a holiday resort and a centre of commerce. Mangalappuzha, a branch of the Periyar that bifurcates at Aluva, was known as a significant centre of trade in South India. Before Indian independence, Aluva was part of the Kingdom of Travancore and served as the official summer residence of its royal family. In the twentieth century, when a community of Jews resided in Kochi, some individuals maintained holiday homes in Aluva along the banks of the Periyar River.

== Politics ==
Aluva is a constituency in the Kerala Legislative Assembly and forms part of the Chalakudy (Lok Sabha constituency); Anwar Sadath serves as the MLA of Aluva since 2011. It is also part of the Chalakudy (Lok Sabha constituency), represented by MP Benny Behanan.

Administratively, Aluva is governed as a municipality. The current municipal council is led by the Indian National Congress Party under Saiji Jolly, who was elected in December 2025.

== Travel ==
Aluva is well connected to other parts of India via air, road, and rail.

=== Air ===
Cochin International Airport is located 15 km (9.3 mi) from the town centre and offers both domestic and international connections.

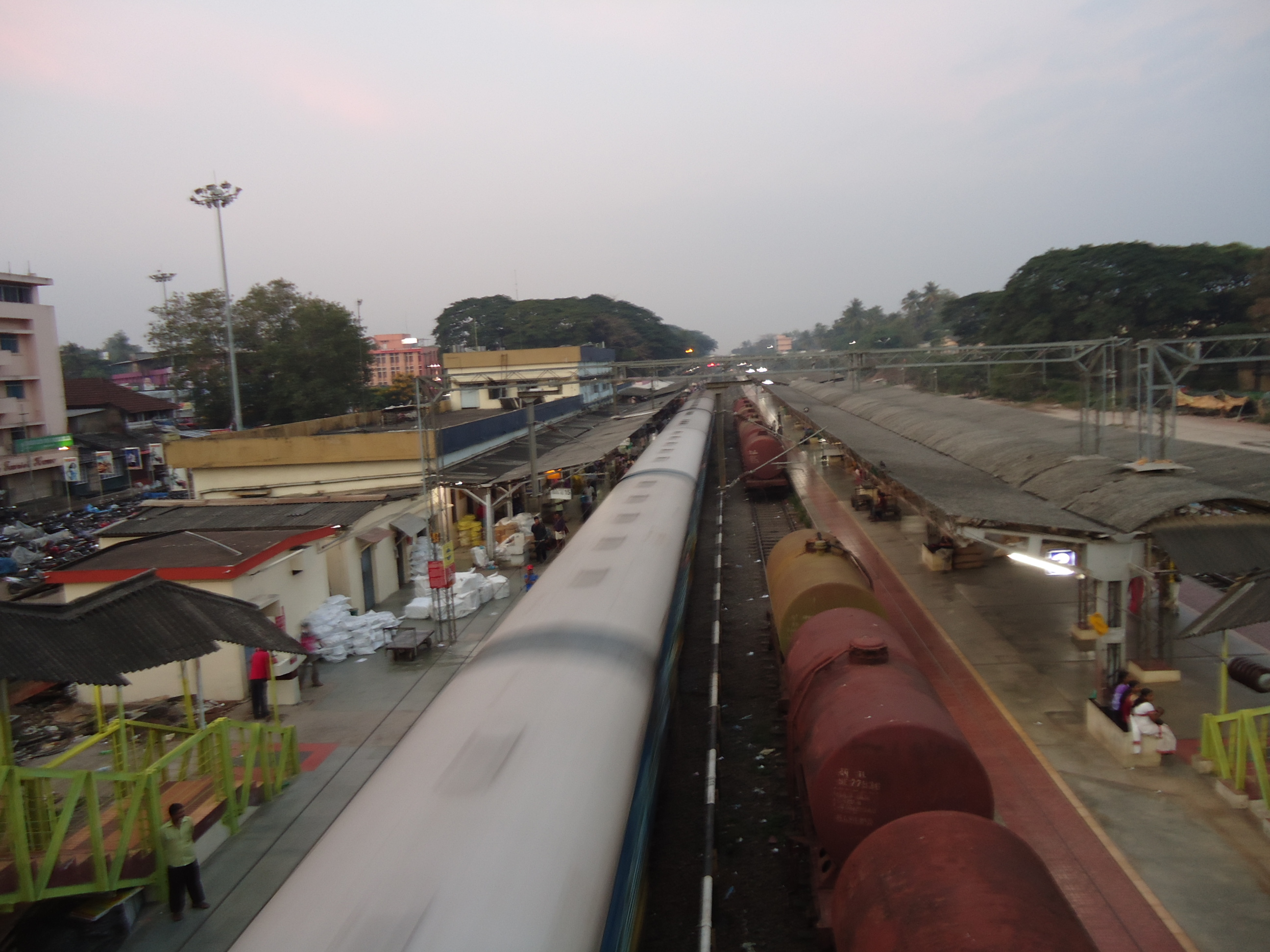
Aluva Railway Station

=== Rail ===
==== Train ====
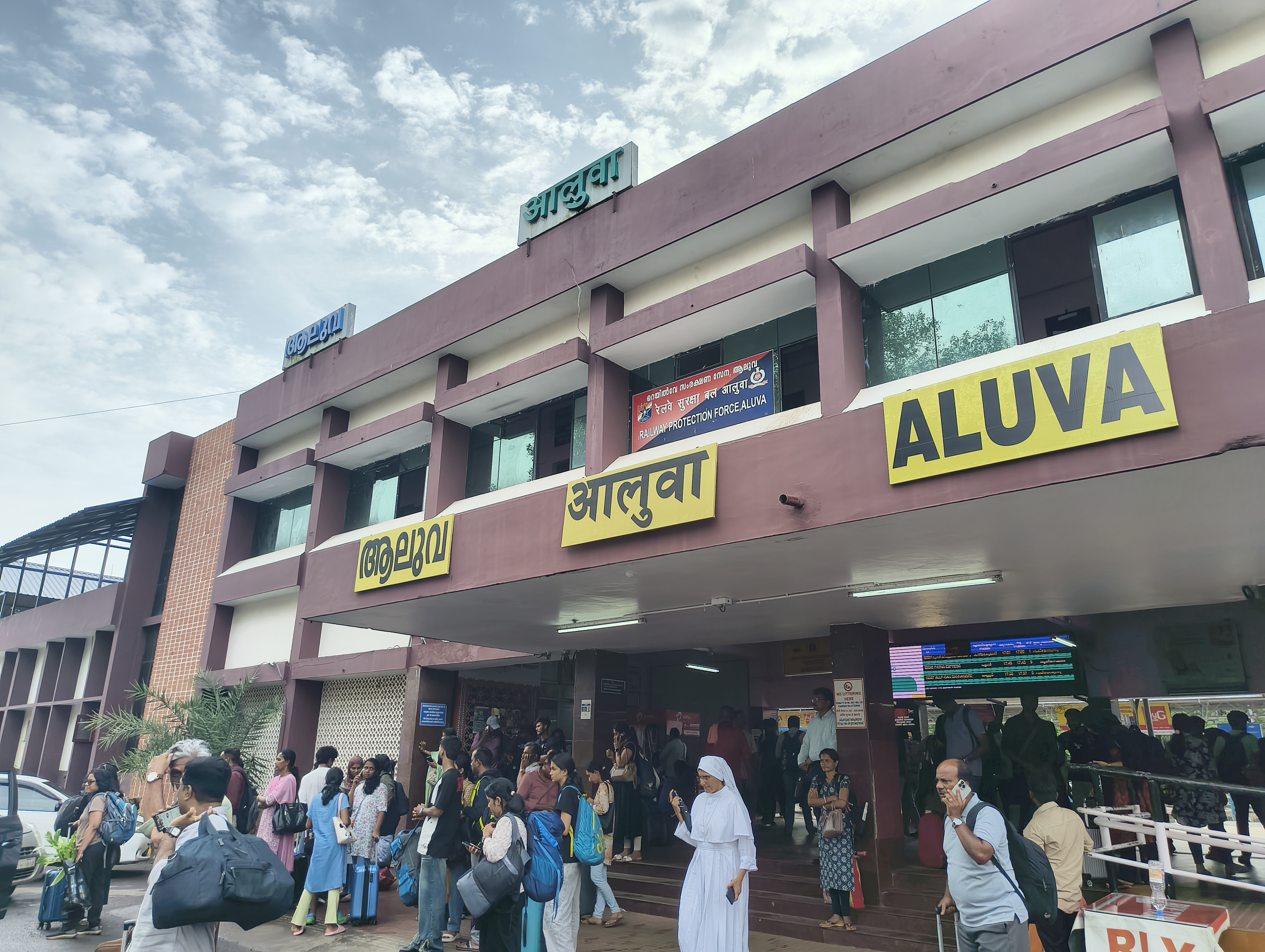
Entry of Aluva Railway Station

Aluva Railway Station (IR Code: AWY) is a grade-A station and the third busiest in Kochi after Ernakulam Junction railway station and Ernakulam Town railway station. Every passenger and express train bound for southern Kerala stops here. Travelers from the Idukki district typically use Aluva railway station, as the topography of Idukki does not allow the district to have a railway station. Notably, no trains originate or terminate at Aluva Railway Station. Additionally, a smaller station, Chowara, is located approximately 4 km (2.5 mi) from the Aluva railway station.

==== Metro ====
Kochi Metro Phase 1 starts at the Aluva Bypass and operates till Tripunithura. The construction of the project was started in mid-2013 and commenced its operations on 19 June 2017. Kochi Metro Rail Limited is a project of the Kerala Government undertaken by DMRC aside from Aluva Flyover. Aluva metro station is the northern terminus of Phase 1. The metro system's third phase is supposed to extend the line further north from Aluva to the northern suburb Angamaly in order to connect to the Cochin International Airport.

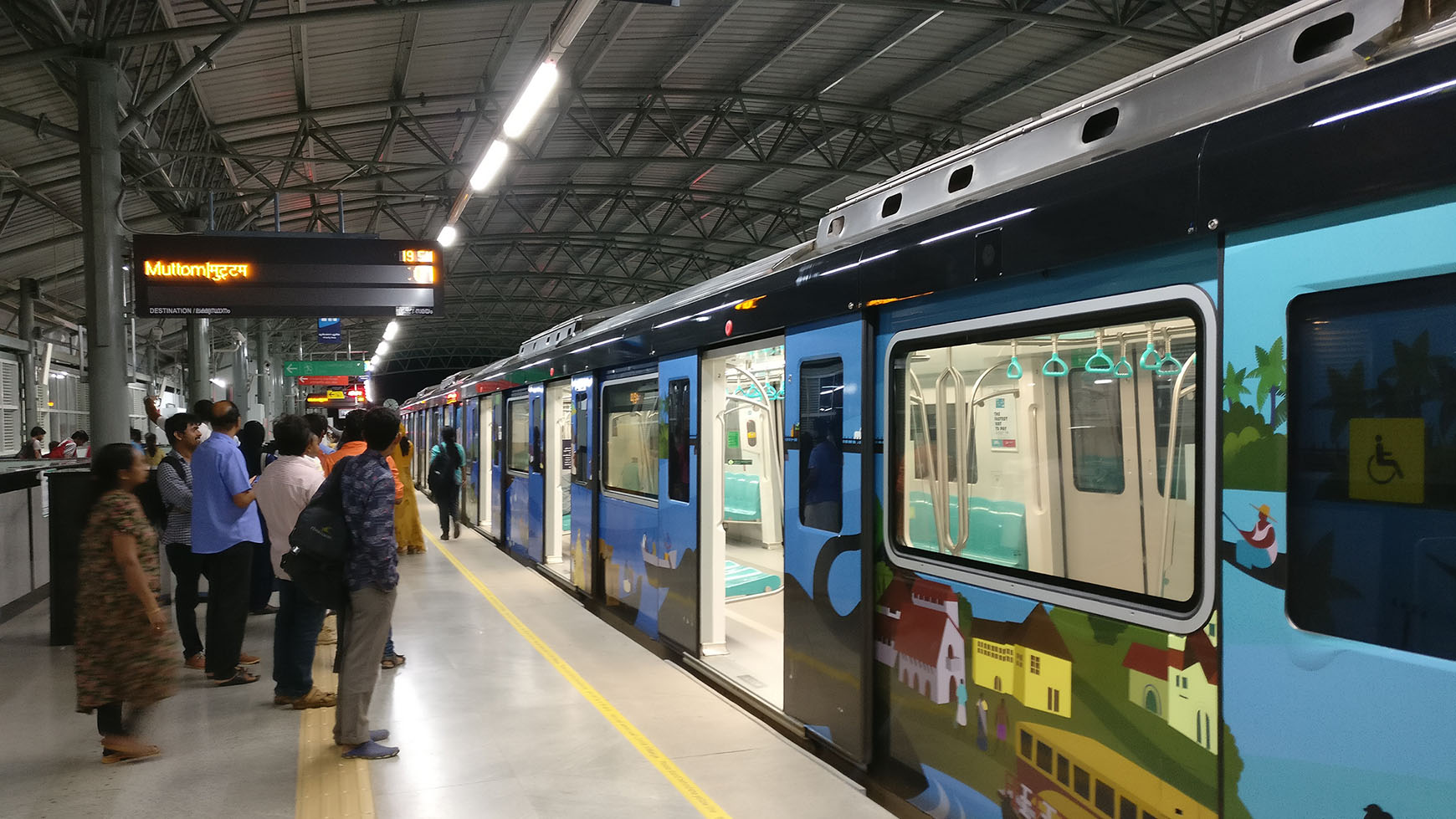
Train at Aluva Metro Station

=== Bus ===
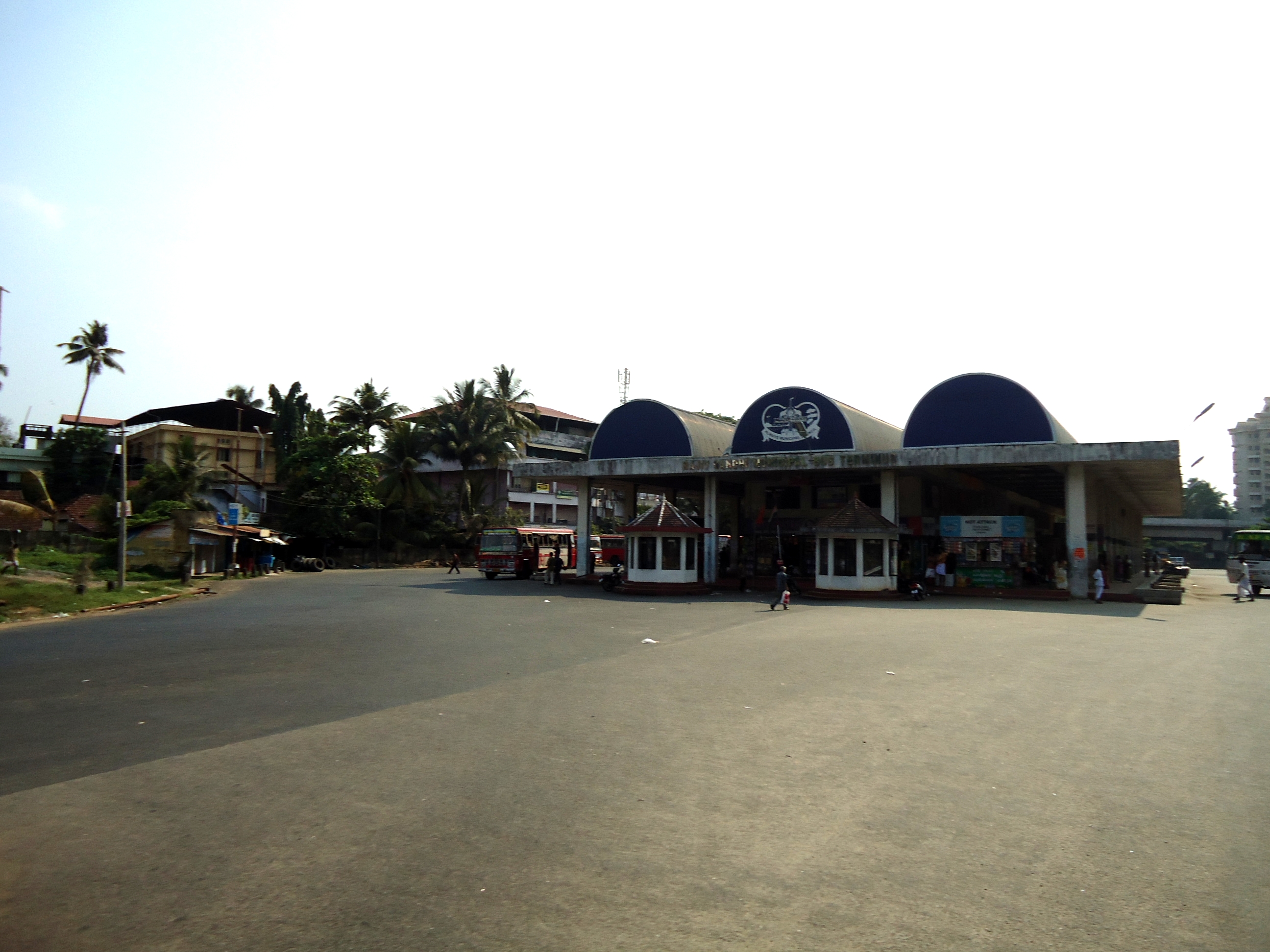
Rajiv Gandhi bus station

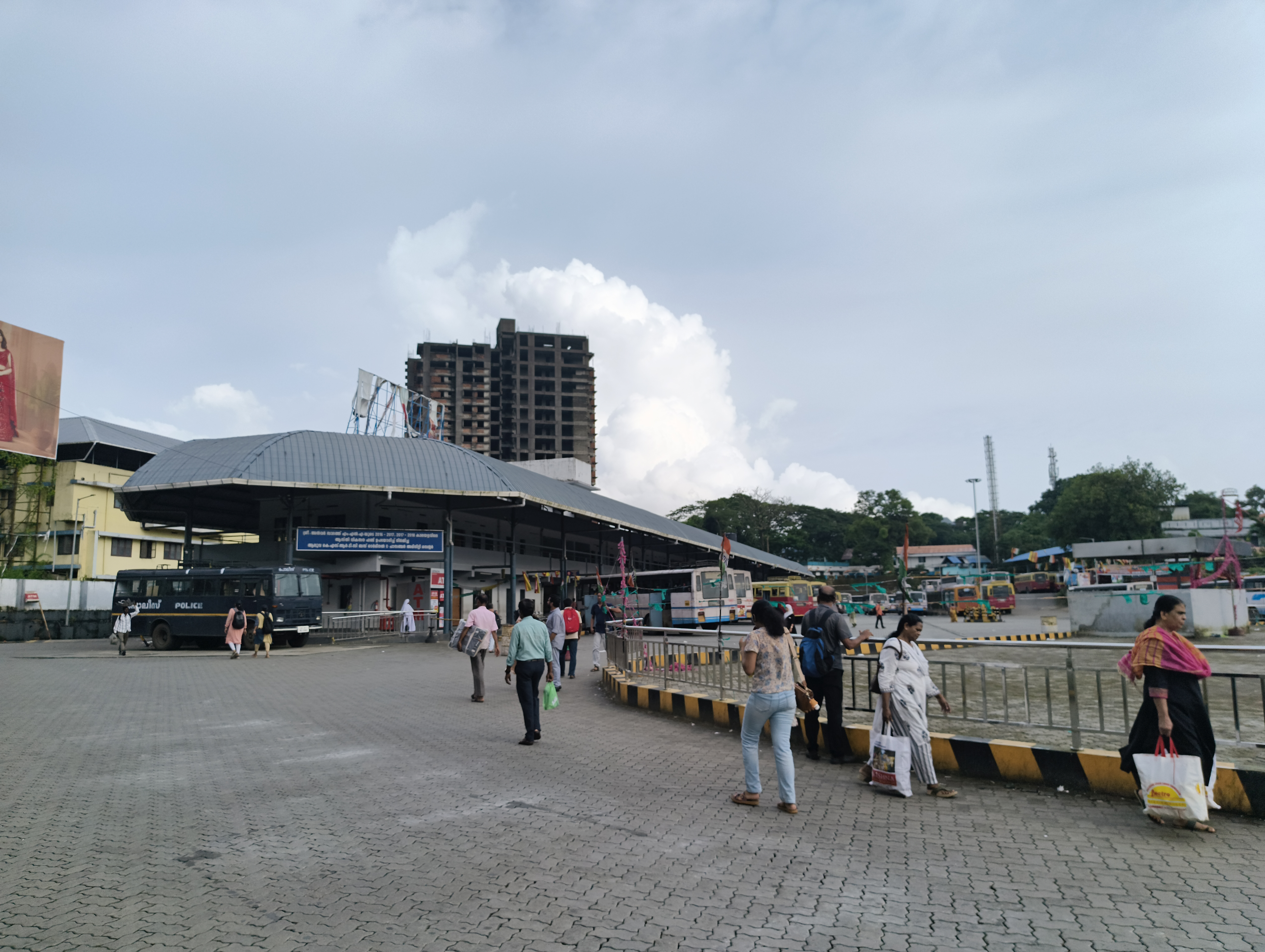
Renovated Aluva KSRTC Busterminal

Rajiv Gandhi Central Bus Station is one of the largest private bus terminals in Kochi and Kerala. It acts as a node for Kochi city buses, with intra-city services to city regions such as Fort Kochi, Tripunithura, Kakkanad etc. Aluva KSRTC bus station is also one of the important KSRTC bus stations in central Kerala. The daily passenger buses of Karnataka State Road Transport Corporation and Tamil Nadu State Transport Corporation have routes to places such as Mysore, Mangaluru, Bengaluru, Tiruchirappalli, Coimbatore, Salem district, Palani, and Kodaikanal.

Privately operated interstate buses to Bangalore, Chennai, Mysore, Mumbai, and other cities have stops in the point of Aluva. Kochi Metro Rail Limited also runs a feeder bus service from Aluva metro station to Cochin International Airport using electric bus.

=== Ferry ===
Aluva is a stop for National Waterway 3; the waterway connects to Thiruvananthapuram in the south and to Kottappuram, Thrissur in the north.

Landmarks

- Marthanda Varma Bridge Aluva
- Aluva Mahadeva Temple

== Culture ==
Aluva's culture has been influenced by the people native to it and by those attracted to it due to factors such as its proximity to the Periyar River.

Several Malayalam movie songs are dedicated to the Periyar River. Poets such as Changapuzha Krishna Pillai, G. Sankara Kurup, Balachandran Chullikkadu, critic Kuttipuzha Krishnapilla, and novelist Subash Chandran are from Aluva and lived there. Though not from the Aluva area, Vayalar Ramavarma and O.N.V. Kurup also wrote about Periyar, as Aluva influenced their writing.

Several newspapers and magazines were published in Aluva during the print era. Continuing with the tradition of published writing, the first online magazine and blogging platform was started in Aluva by puzha.com, which still exists on the Internet.

== Business ==
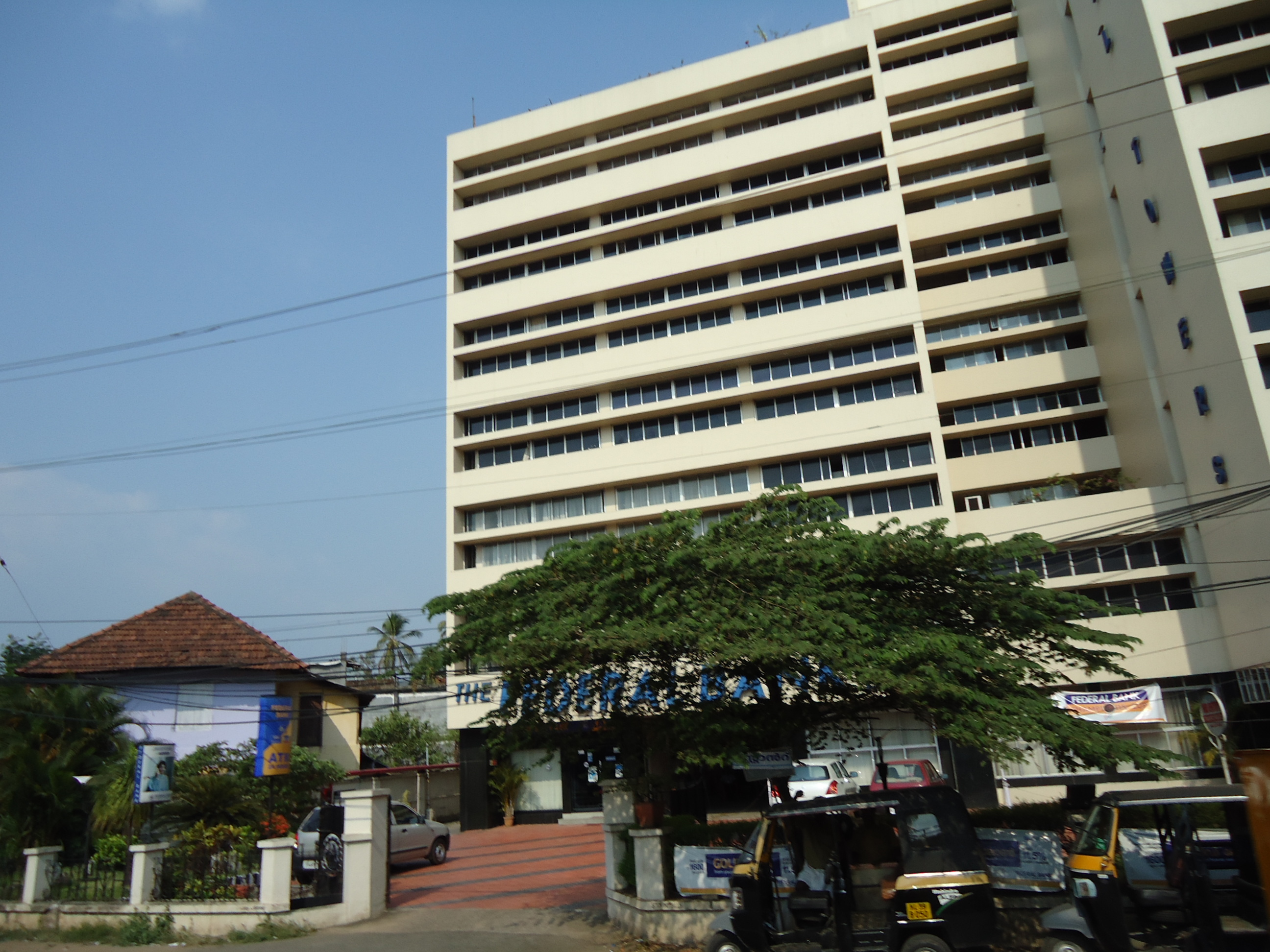
Federal Bank Head Office, Aluva

Aluva is the home of multiple business headquarters. Aluva is known for its "Aluva Pukayillatha Aduppu" (smokeless stove), which was invented by the Alwaye Settlement Church. The Federal Bank, has its headquarters in Aluva. Additionally, the Kerala State Civil Service Academy has established a branch in Aluva.

== Notable people from Aluva ==
- Dileep (film actor)
- John Abraham (Bollywood actor)
- Nivin Pauly (film actor)
- Amala Paul (film actress)
- Pearle Maaney (film actress, TV host)
- Varghese Payyappilly Palakkappilly
- Baburaj (actor)
- Anna Rajan (actress)
- M. K. Mackar Pillay (industrialist)
- M. M. Abdul Khader (former Advocate General of Kerala)
- M. M. Pareed Pillay (former Chief Justice of Kerala)
- Kalamandalam Haridas (musician)
- Sainuddin (actor)
- Siju Wilson (film actor)
- N. F. Varghese (film actor)
- Ajmal Ameer (film actor)
- Alphonse Puthren (film director)
- Sharaf U Dheen (film actor)
- Shabareesh Varma (film actor, poet, singer)
- Venu V. Desom (poet)
- Tini Tom (film actor, comedian)
- Sitaraman Sankaranarayana Iyer (nature activist)
- N. K. Desam (poet)
- G.N. Gopal (Chess player)
- Krishna Sankar (film actor)
- Sajin Gopu (actor)
- Shritha Sivadas (actor)

== Gallery ==
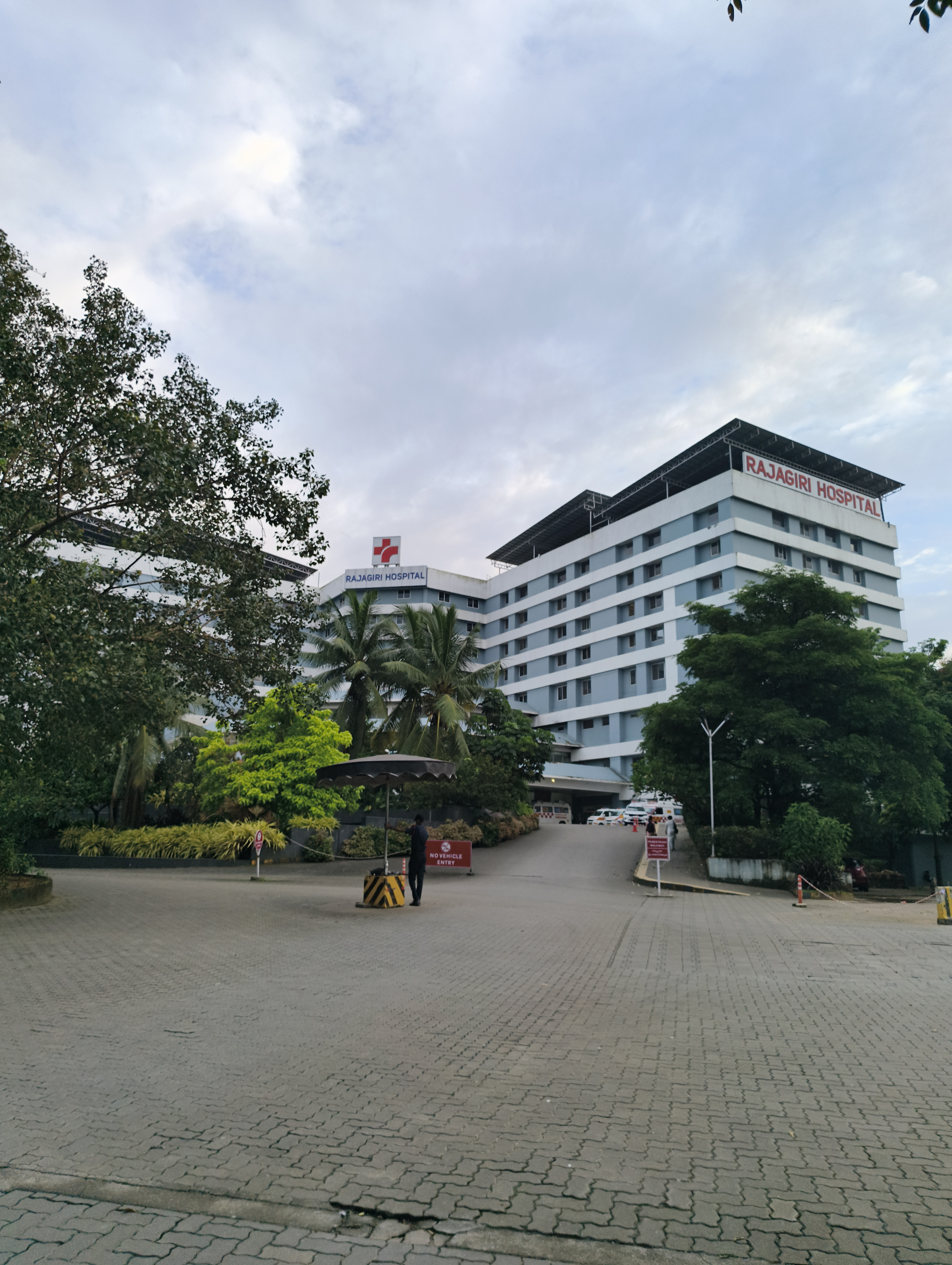
Rajagiri Hospital, Aluva

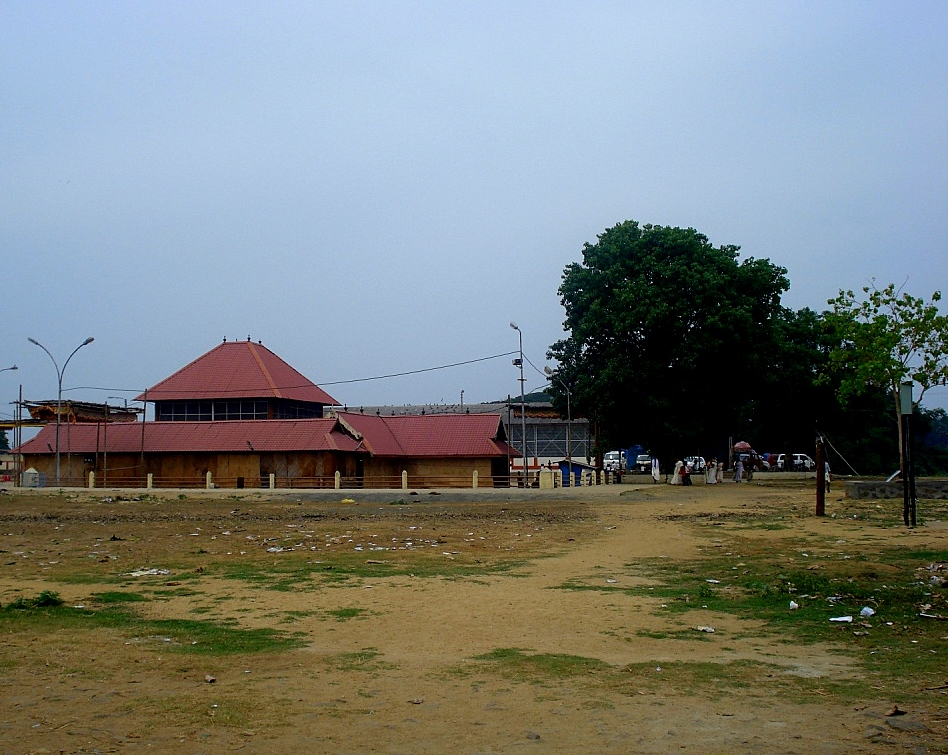
Aluva Manapuram

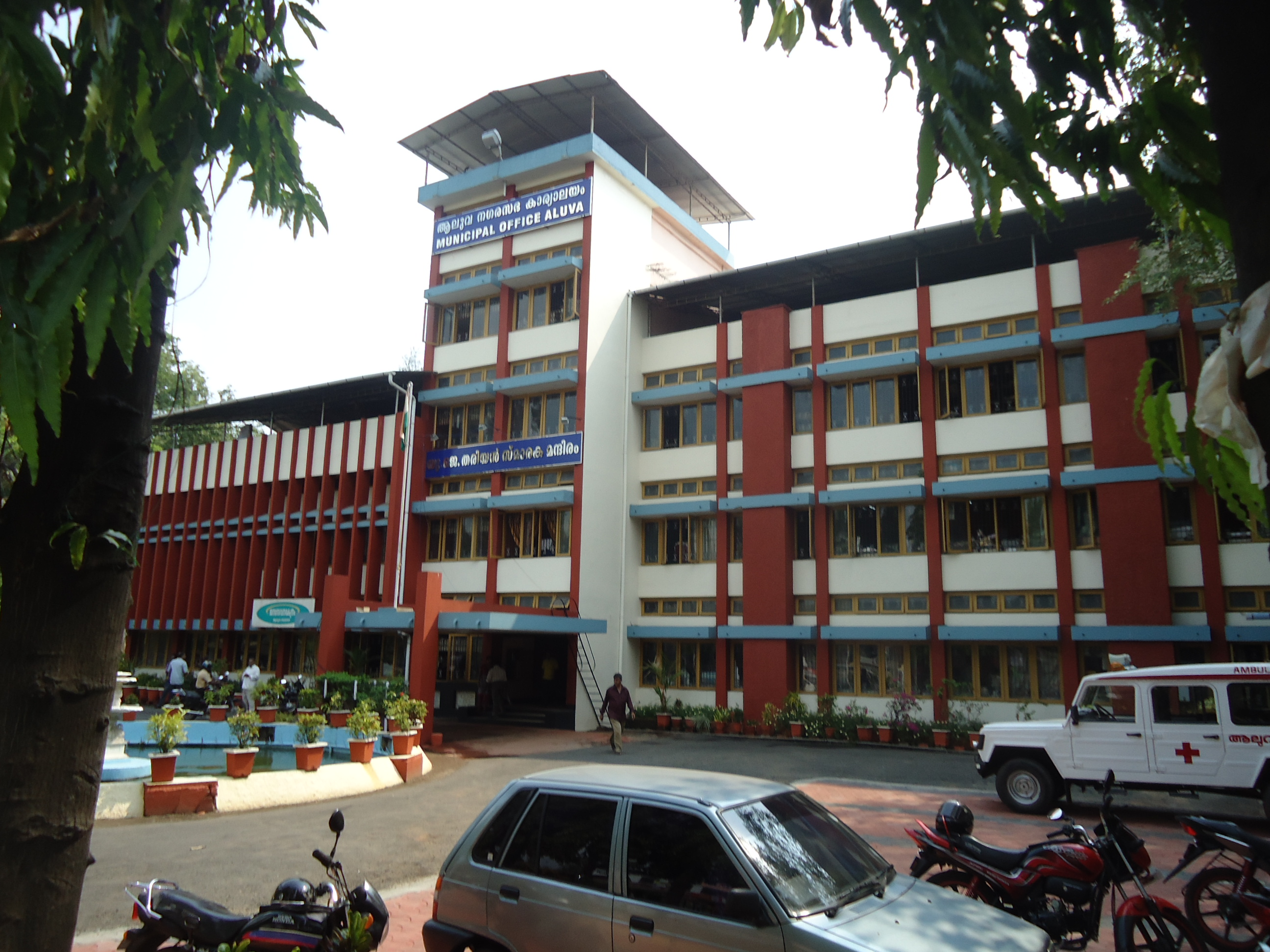
Municipal Office Aluva

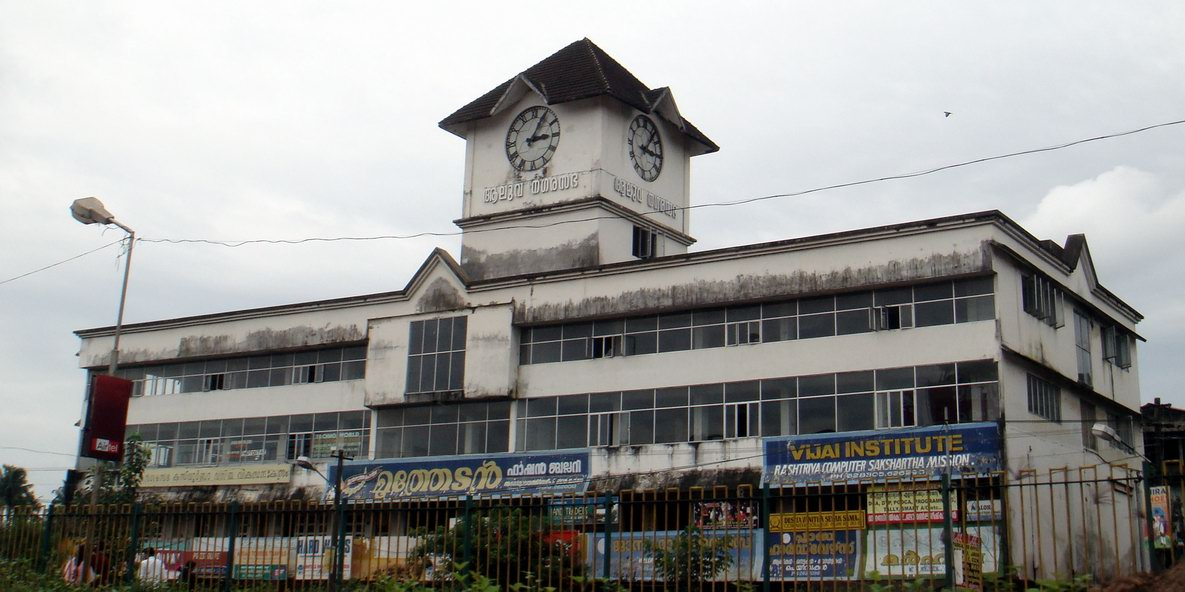
Private Bus Terminal Aluva

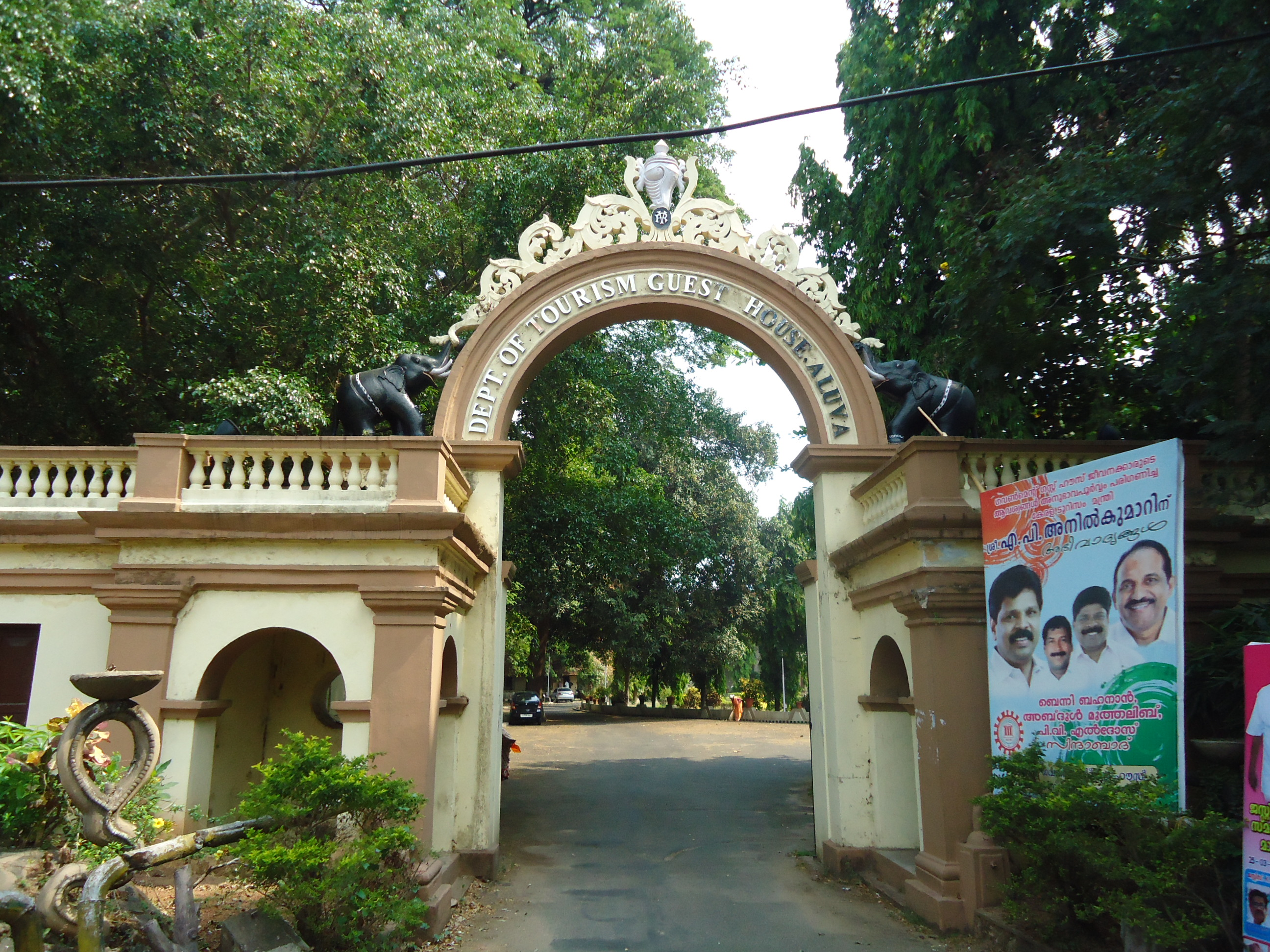
Aluva Palace Entrance

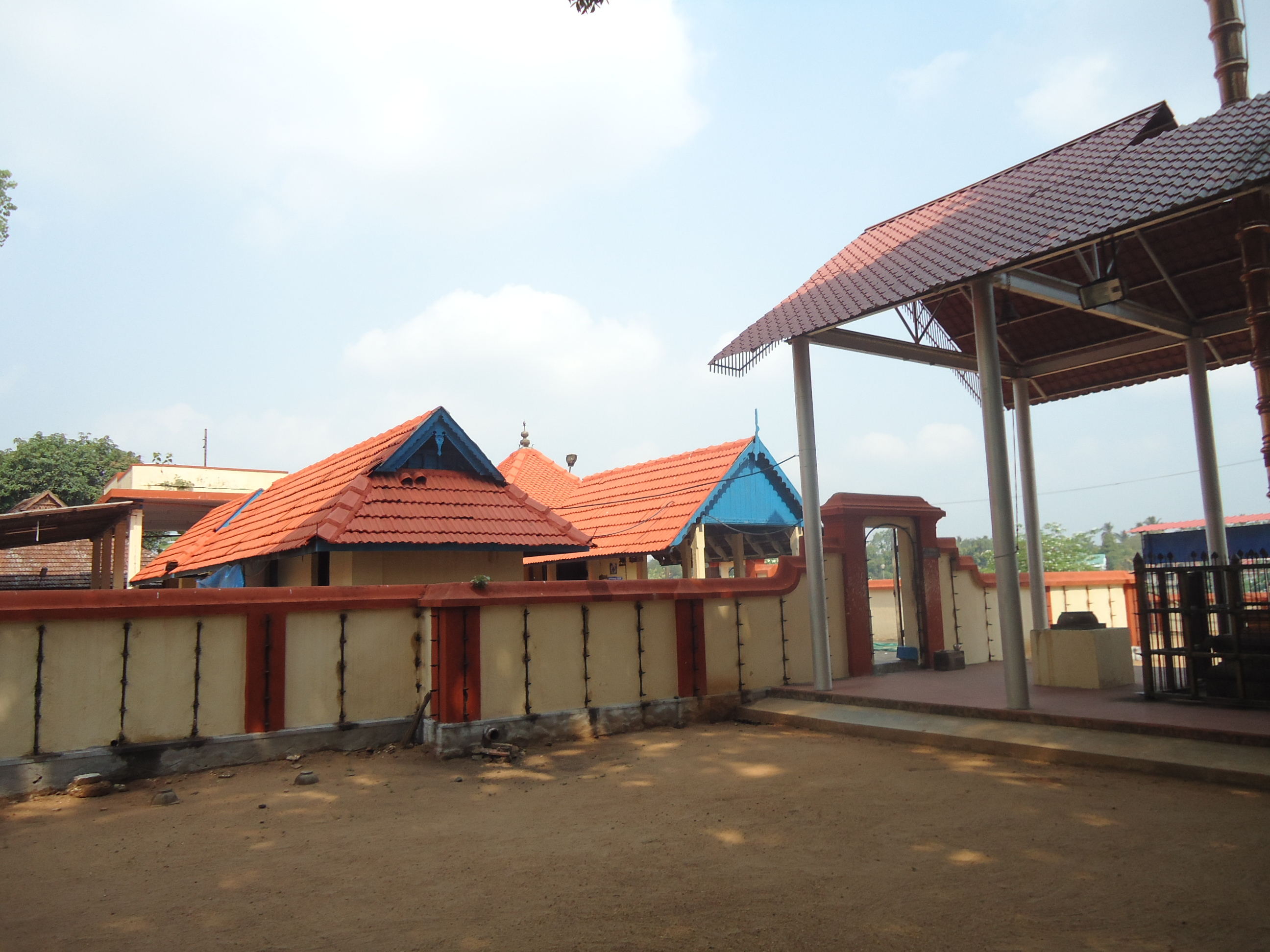
Sree Krishna Temple Aluva

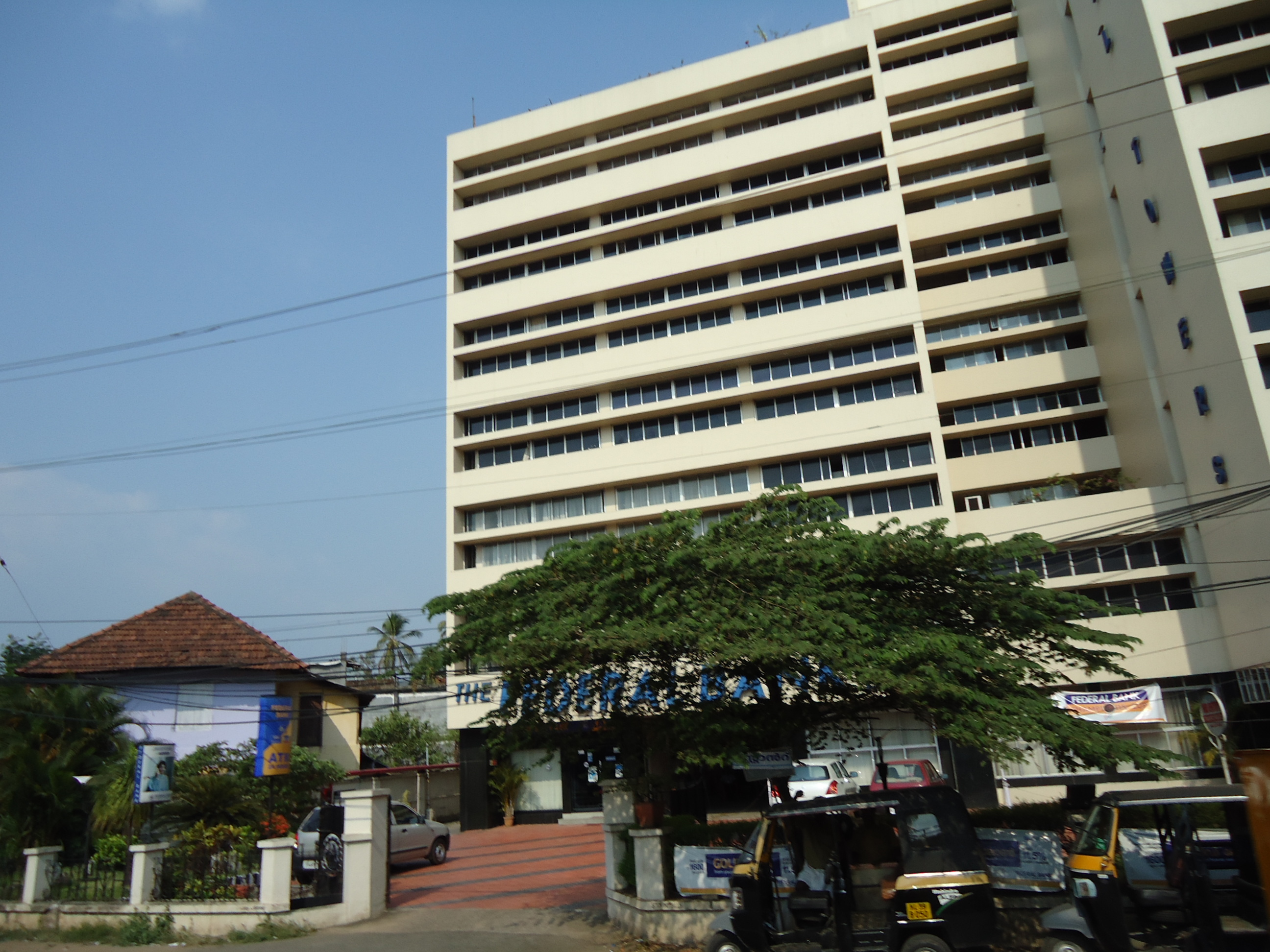
Federal Bank HO Aluva

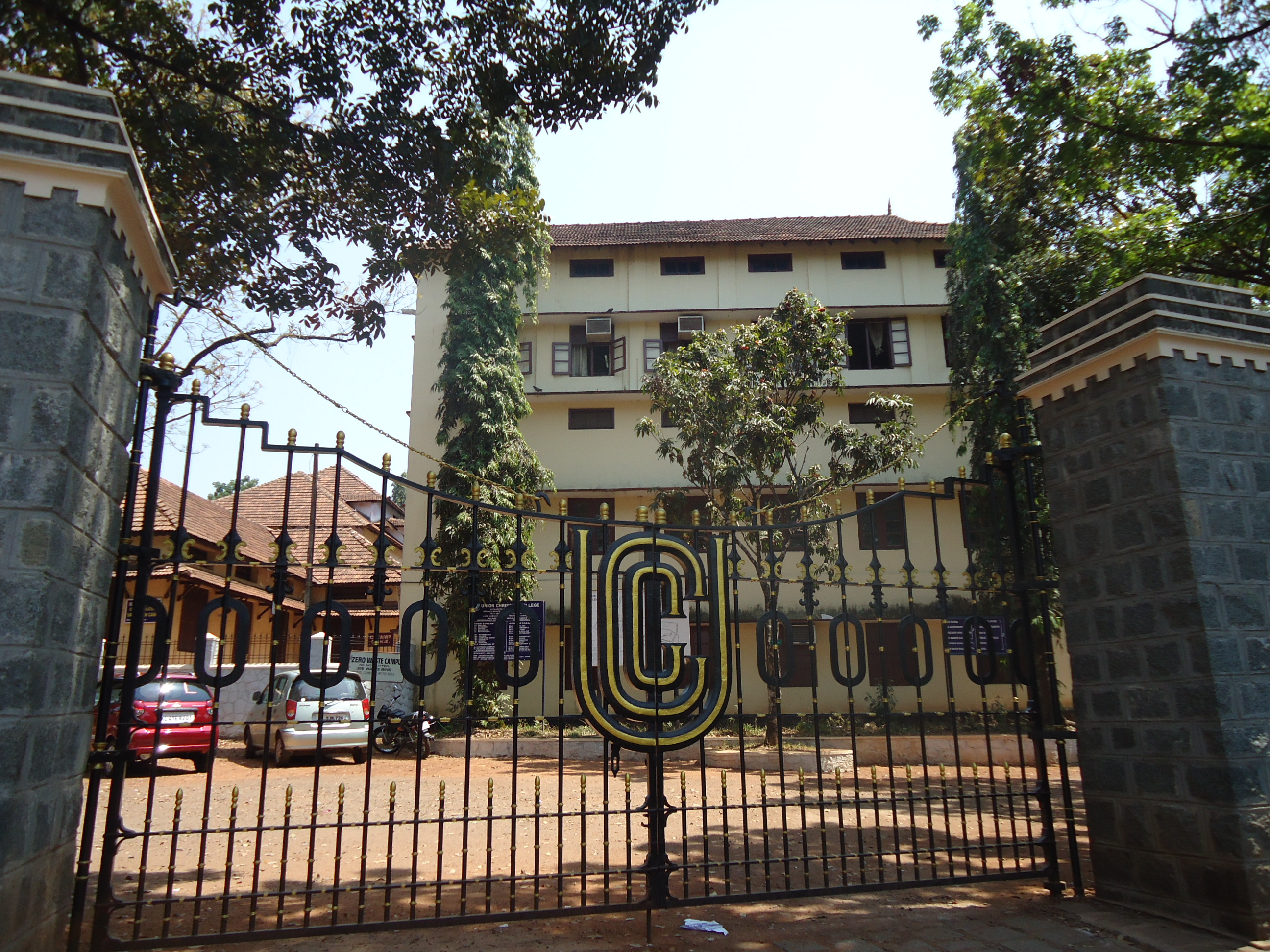
UC College Aluva

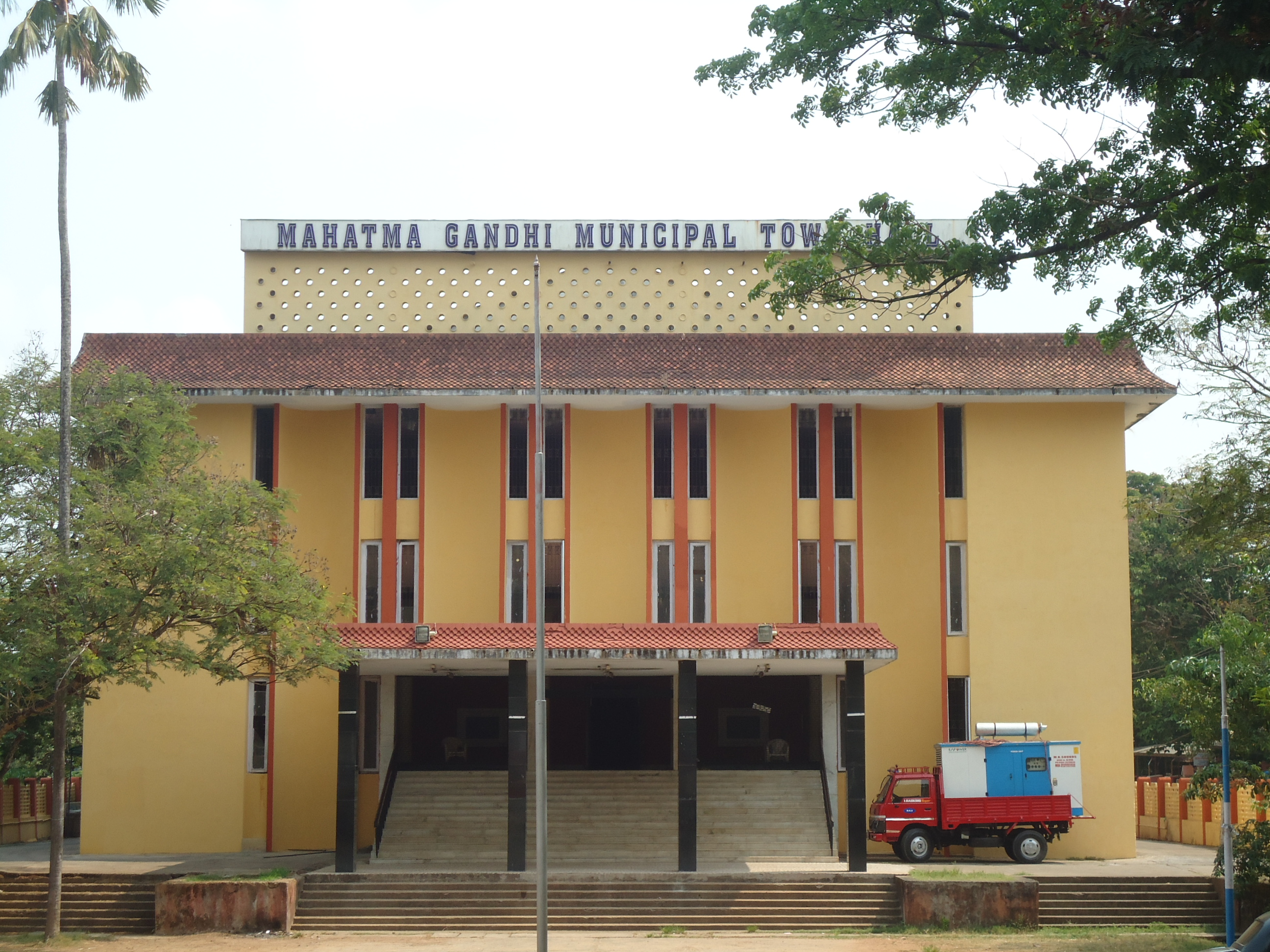
Town Hall Aluva

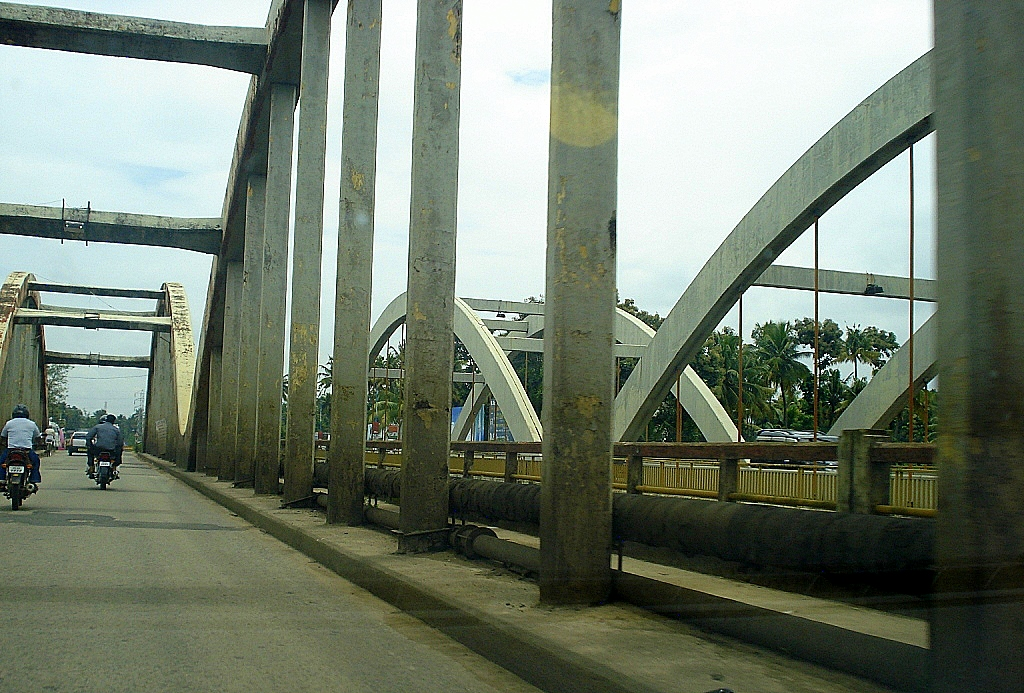
Marthanda Varma Bridge Aluva

== See also ==
- Aluva Sivarathri festival
- Aluva Railway Station
- Marthanda Varma Bridge
- Aluva–Paravur Road
