= Venu V. Desom =

Indian writer (born 1959)

- വേണു വി ദേശം
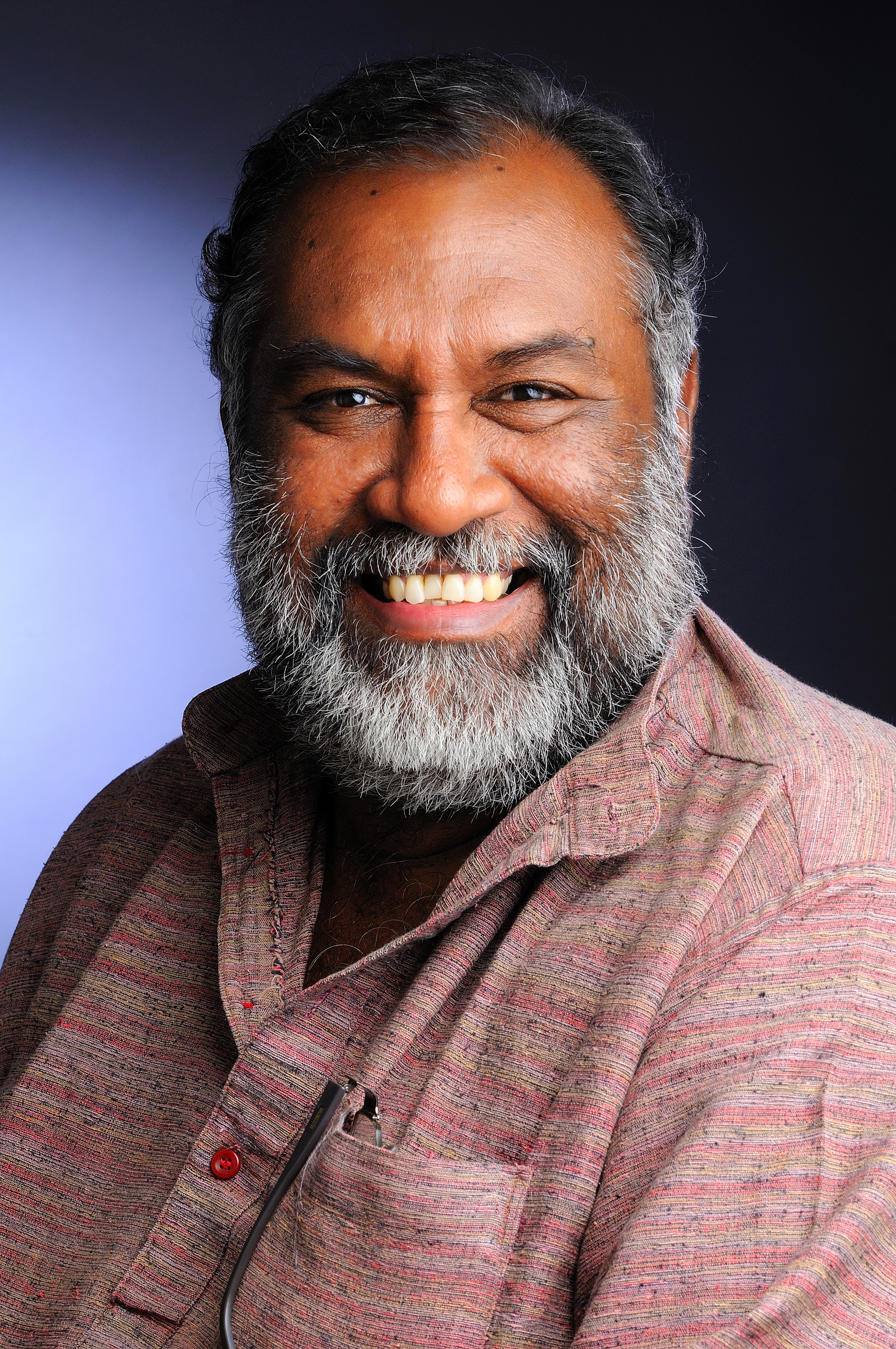
- Born: 1959 (age 65–66); Desom, Aluva, Kerala, India
- Spouse: Asha Venugopal

Venu V. Desom (Malayalam:വേണു വി ദേശം; born May 1959 at Desom village, Aluva, Kerala, India) is a Malayalam poet, novelist, lyricist, and translator. He was the first Malayalam poet to write gazals in Malayalam. Apart from original works many of which have received Awards, he has also translated works of various classic writers into Malayalam, including those of Fyodor Dostoevsky, Schopenhauer, Leo Tolstoy, Khalil Gibran, Osho, Jiddu Krishnamurti, and Vladimir Korolenko.

== Works ==
Poetry (കവിതകൾ):-

1. Nilaykkatha Kazhchakal (നിലയ്ക്കാത്ത കാഴ്ചകൾ) - 1991
2. Aadiroopangal (ആദിരൂപങ്ങൾ) - 1981,
3. Rathribhootham (രാത്രിഭൂതം) - 1983
4. Dhyani (ധ്യാനി)-2002
5. Mohaandhakaarasanchaari (മോഹാന്ധകാരസഞ്ചാരി) - 2011

Novels :-

1. Russian Christhu - Logos publishers - 2016. A novel based on Dostoyevsky
2. Priyappetta Leo - Green books - 2016—A novel based on Leo Tolstoy
3. Pranayajeevitham = Biography of Dostoyevsky (DC books 2018)
4. Ariyappedatha Dostoyevsky

Translations :-

1. 19 works of Dostoyevsky include The Raw Youth, Idiot, Crime and Punishment, Eternal Husband, Gentle Spirit, Dream of Ridiculous Man
2. Memories of Anna Dostoyevsky (അന്നയുടെ ഓർമ്മകൾ, അന്നയുടെ കുറിപ്പുകൾ)
3. Memories of Sophia Tolstoy (to be published)
4. Mystic works of Tagore, Lalleshwari, Khalil Gibran, and Jnaneshwar
5. 3 works of Leo Tolstoy

Lyricist:-

1. He wrote lyrics for the FIRST Malayalam gazal album " Pranamam", sung by Umbayee - released in 1998
2. Also wrote lyrics for the film Capachino 2017, sung by P Jayahandran,

Awards :-

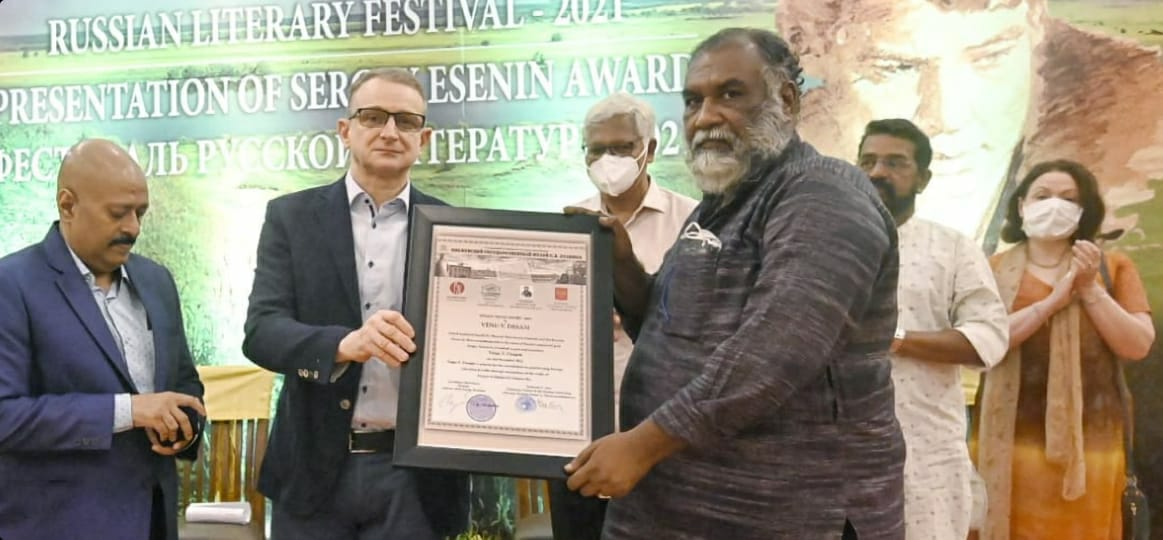
Sergery Esenin Award from Russia

- Kesari Award
- Khazak Award
- Won the award for complete contribution to Malayalam from Adwaithasram Centenary Committee (2014)
- Prof Kaliyath Damodaran Puraskaram (2016)
- Esenin Award for popularising Russian Literature in India- Award jointly instituted by the Russian House Kerala and the Moscow State Esenin Museum.(2021)
- U. C. College Shathabdi Sahithya Puraskaram (2024)

== See also ==
- List of Indian writers
