= Kurma Venu Gopalaswamy =

Advocate, playwright and administrator from India

K. V. Gopalaswamy (or Kurma Venu Gopalaswamy) (Telugu: కూర్మా వేణు గోపాలస్వామి) (1903–1983) was an advocate, playwright and administrator in India. He was the first professor of law at Andhra University and the first honorary professor of theatre arts and chairman of the Faculty of Arts.

== Early life ==
He was born on 19 December 1903. He was the son of Sir Kurma Venkata Reddy Naidu, the former governor of Madras Presidency. He has one sister. He did Bar-at-Law. He was educated at Balliol College, where he earned his master's degree. He was later called to the Bar of the Inner Temple of United Kingdom.

== Career ==
He served as private secretary to the Agent General of India in South Africa in 1930. He served in Andhra University and was appointed as the registrar, a post he held until his retirement, from April 1942 to February 1964. Kurma Venkata Reddy Naidu was governor and ex-officio chancellor of Andhra University in the 1930s. In April 1942, Kurma Venugopalaswamy was appointed registrar of Andhra University, which post he held till his retirement in February 1964. Thus a father and son occupied high positions associated with Andhra University.

After retirement he held the position of director of the Indian Institute of Management and Commerce, Hyderabad, 1973-1978.

== Legacy ==
He played hockey and tennis and was the captain of the Madras Christian College Lawn Tennis Association. He played hockey against many international teams and partnered with late Shri Fakhruddin Ali Ahmed in an international tennis tournament in France.

His birth centenary celebrations were organised by a committee headed by the AU vice-chancellor, Y.C. Simhadri. They were inaugurated on 19 December 2003, and concluded with the valedictory on 29 January 2004. A souvenir was released with contributory articles from his students and beneficiaries.

He was awarded an honorary doctorate (D.Litt.) by Andhra University in recognition of his services and intellectual contributions on the occasion of the fiftieth convocation in 1977.

He took active interest in amateur theatre and it was due to his efforts, the Department of Theatre Arts was established. The open-air theatre known to earlier batches of students as Erskine Square is now named after him – Kurma Venugopalaswamy Arubayalu Rangasthalam.

Prof. K.V. Gopalaswamy Memorial All India Playlets Competitions were organized annually.

He died in 1983.

== Publications ==
- Intermediate Rangasthala Sastramu
