= Vengola =

- village
- Location in Kerala, India Vengola (India)
- Coordinates: 10.082°N 76.467°E
- Country: India
- State: Kerala
- District: Ernakulam

Government
  - Body: Panchayat

Population (2011)
  - Total: 32,697

Languages
  - Official: Malayalam, English
- Time zone: UTC+5:30 (IST)
- PIN: 683556 (shared with Allapra and Valayanchirangara)
- Telephone code: 0484
- Vehicle registration: KL 40
- Nearest city: Perumbavoor
- Lok Sabha constituency: Chalakudy
- Vidhan Sabha constituency: Perumbavoor
- Civic agency: Panchayat

Vengola is a Panchayat and Village in Kunnathunad Taluk of Ernakulam district in the Indian state of Kerala. It lies in the bus route from Perumbavoor to Kolenchery. Nearby villages are Kizhakkambalam (4.4 km), Vadavucode/Puthencruz (6.4 km), Kunnathunad (6.4 km), Rayamangalam (6.9 km), Choornikkara (7.1 km), Vazhakulam (2.7 km).

== Demographics ==
As of 2011 India census, Vengola had a population of 32697 with 16584 males and 16113 females in a total of 7791 households. According to the same census, the total number of literates in the village is 27507 (14233 males and 13274 females), bringing the total literacy rate to 84.12%. The majority of people living in vengola are Syrian Christians.

== Institutions ==
=== Banks ===
1. Union Bank of India, Arakkapady (Vengola), IFSC code: UBIN0537888.
2. State Bank of India, Keezhmad, IFSC code: SBIN0070378, MICR code: Waiting.
3. State Bank of India, Kizhakkambalam, IFSC code: SBIN0070425.
4. Federal Bank, Kizhakkambalam, IFSC code: FDRL0001035.
5. Federal Bank, Vengola, IFSC code: FDRL0001824.
6. Cooperative Bank Vengola
