= Pukkattupady =

- town
- Nickname: PYC
- Location in Kerala, India Pukkattupady (India)
- Coordinates: 10°3′34″N 76°23′44″E
- Country: India
- State: Keralam
- District: Ernakulam

Government
  - Type: Democratic
  - Body: Panchayath

Area
  - Total: 5 km^{2} (1.9 sq mi)
- Elevation: 12 m (39 ft)

Languages
  - Official: Malayalam, മലയാളം
- Time zone: UTC+5:30 (IST)
- PIN: 683561/2
- Telephone code: 0484268****
- Vehicle registration: KL-40/41

Pukkattupady is a suburb of the city of Kochi, in Ernakulam District, Keralam, India. Situated around 15 km (9.3 mi) east of the city centre, it is an intersection of major bus route from Aluva via F.A.C.T and BPCL to Thrippunithura and Kolenchery via Kizhakkambalam and the routes from Perumbavoor to Ernakulam via Naval Physical and Oceanographic Laboratory or Edappally.

It comes under Edathala and Kizhakkambalam Gram panchayats. It belongs to Central Keralam Division.

The town is 10 kilometres towards East from District headquarters Kakkanad and 216 km from State capital Thiruvananthapuram. It is 11 kilometres from Edapally and 10 kilometres from Aluva Metro station. Being a suburb in City of Kochi, the greatest advantage of Pukkatupady is that the distance between the main centres of Kochi city and Pukkatupady are almost same.

To its south is Pazhanganad and Kizhakkambalam, east is Oorakkad and Thamarachal, south west is Kakkanad and to north is South Vazhakulam and Malayidomthuruth, north west is Choondy.

== Connectivity ==
=== By Road ===
Pukkattupady is well connected by roads to all major centers of Ernakulam district, including Perumbavoor, Aluva and Edappally. Pukkattupady is connected by private buses which ply regularly. 6.4 km to Wonderla Amusement Park from Pukatupady Smart city is 9 km from Pukkatupady. InfoPark Kochi is 9 km from Pukkatupady.

=== By Air ===
Pukkattupady is located about 21 kilometers away from the nearest airport, Cochin International Airport.

=== By Rail ===
The Aluva Railway Station is just 8 kilometers and Kalamassery Railway Station is 11 km and Edappally Railway Station is just 13 km from Pukkattupady.

== Religious places ==
- St Mary's Jacobite Valiyapally, Thamarachal

== Hospitals ==
- Samaritain Hospital, Pazhanganad
- Thaqdees Hospital at Pukkattupady
- Ayswarya Hospital

The Rajagiri Hospital is located just 4.3 km away from Pukkattupady.
