= Mazhuvannoor =

- village
- Location in Kerala, India Mazhuvannoor (India)
- Coordinates: 10.009494°N 76.4967919°E
- Country: India
- State: Kerala
- District: Ernakulam
- Taluk: Kunnathunad
- Elevation: 23 m (75 ft)

Population (2011)
  - Total: 14,946
- Time zone: UTC+5:30 (IST)
- STD Code: 0484
- Vehicle registration: KL-
- 2011 census code: 627949
- Nearest city: Kolenchery (4 km)
- Lok Sabha: Chalakudy Lok Sabha constituency
- Legislative Assembly: Kunnathunad Assembly constituency

Mazhuvannoor is a panchayat village in the Ernakulam district of Kerala, India. It is located in the Kunnathunad taluk. It is located near the town of Kolenchery. The panchayat headquarters are located at Airapuram.

== History ==
During the pre-independence period, the warrior community who served as custodians of the Mazhuvannoor Bhagavathi Kshethram in South Mazhuvannoor held a significant portion of the agricultural land in the region until the implementation of the Kerala Land Reforms Act, which redistributed land ownership across the state.

In the 1890s, Gregorios of Parumala visited Mazhuvannoor and stayed there for a period of time. He consecrated the newly reconstructed Mazhuvannoor Church in 1891 (Kollavarsham 1067), which had been rebuilt through the efforts of the local community.

Local traditions link his visit to events such as efforts to protect the paddy fields of Njeriyamkuzhi Paadam from pest infestations and a prophecy concerning the Periyar River, which later became a key source of irrigation for the region through the Periyar Valley High Level Canal Project, even though the Muvattupuzha River is geographically closer. According to these accounts, he prayed that the river’s flow would reach the area and that the land would yield “a hundred, sixty, and thirtyfold harvest.”

== Geography ==
Mazhuvannoor is located 5 km north of Kolenchery, 12 km west of Muvattupuzha, 17 km south of Perumbavoor and 29 km east of Ernakulam. South Mazhuvannoor, Airapuram, Valayanchirangara, Thrikkalathoor, Mannoor, Mangalathunada, Nellad, Thattamughal, Valambur are the noted places in the panchayath.

== Etymology ==
The name Mazhuvannoor (Malayalam: മഴുവന്നൂര്‍) is believed to derive from “Mazhuvarooru,” meaning “habitat of the Mazhuvar.” In ancient Tamil and Malayalam, mazhu means axe, and Mazhuvar referred to people associated with iron work and axe-making, as noted in Sangam texts like the Purananuru

Geologically, the area is rich in iron-bearing soil, supporting the view that early inhabitants were iron workers or toolmakers. Over time, Mazhuvarooru evolved phonetically into Mazhuvannoor, literally “place of the axe.”

== Demographics ==
According to the 2011 census of India, Mazhuvannoor has 3679 households. The literacy rate of the village is 88.38%.

Demographics (2011 Census)
	Total	Male	Female
Population	14946	7560	7386
Children aged below 6 years	1197	622	575
Scheduled caste	1673	836	837
Scheduled tribe	29	15	14
Literates	13209	6761	6448
Workers (all)	6833	4443	2390
Main workers (total)	5153	3545	1608
Main workers: Cultivators	667	544	123
Main workers: Agricultural labourers	468	288	180
Main workers: Household industry workers	66	44	22
Main workers: Other	3952	2669	1283
Marginal workers (total)	1680	898	782
Marginal workers: Cultivators	217	151	66
Marginal workers: Agricultural labourers	305	128	177
Marginal workers: Household industry workers	28	8	20
Marginal workers: Others	1130	611	519
Non-workers	8113	3117	4996

== Religion ==
Jacobite Syrian Orthodox Church Christians in Mazhuvannoor associated with St. Thomas Cathedral Valiya Palli Mazhuvannoor, St. George Church Kunnakkurudy, St. George Chapel Mangalathunada, St. Mary’s Chapel Thattamughal, St. Mary’s Church Veettoor, and Guardian Angel Retirement Home Airapuram, all under the Holy See of Antioch.

St. George Cathedral at Kunnakkurudy, an 18th-century church, is affiliated with the Malankara Orthodox Syrian Church.

Other Christian churches include St. George Malankara Catholic Church Mangalathunada and St. Joseph Syro-Malabar Church Mudavoor.

Hindu temples in the area include Blandevar Mahavishnu Temple, Nellad Shiva Temple, Sree Mahadeva Temple at Valamboor, South Mazhuvannoor Bhagavati Kshetram, Vimala Sri Mahadeva Temple, NSS Hall South Mazhuvannoor and SNDP Hall at Valayanchirangara.

The Airapuram Juma Masjid is the major place of Muslim worship in the region. All these communities coexist peacefully, living together in harmony.

== Notable people ==
- Gregorios of Parumala(1848–1902)

== Infrastructure ==
State Highway 41 (Thekkady Road) is the principal road passing through Mazhuvannoor, providing major connectivity to nearby towns and regions. Other important roads include the Peruvammuzhi–Mazhuvannoor Road, Mazhuvannoor–Kadayiruppu Road, and Thattamughal–Trikalathur Road.

== Education ==
Mazhuvannoor and its nearby regions possess a well-developed educational network comprising government, aided, and private institutions. Among the government lower primary schools, notable ones include Mazhuvannoor Government L.P. School, Government L.P. School Boys Mazhuvannoor, Government L.P. School Veettoor, and the Mangalathunada Government School.

The aided institutions in the region consist of St. Thomas L.P. School, Nellad, N.S.S. Government L.P. School, Airapuram, and St. Paul’s G.L.P.S., Airapuram at the lower primary level. At the upper primary stage, S.R.V.U.P. School, Mazhuvannoor (established in 1938), Valamboor Government U.P. School, Government U.P. School, North Mazhuvannoor, and Saraswathy Vidya Niketan, Airapuram, serve the local community.

For high school and higher secondary education, the area is home to M.R.S.V. High School,Mazhuvannoor (established in 1983), Ebenezer Higher Secondary School, Veettoor, and Guardian Angel English Medium Higher Secondary School, all operating under aided management.

In the government sector, Valayanchirangara Government Higher Secondary School provides higher secondary education. In the private sector, Bethsada Junior School, Airapuram, and King David International School, Veettoor, offer modern academic facilities and value-based education.

At the higher education level, Christ Knowledge City, located near Mannoor, offers engineering and technology programs. Sree Sankara Vidyapeetom College, Airapuram, founded in 1967, provides undergraduate and postgraduate courses in arts, science, and commerce. CET College of Management, Science and Technology, Airapuram, offers Bachelor of Commerce programs with specialisations in marketing, finance and taxation, and computer applications.

== Health Care ==
Mazhuvannoor Panchayat has several healthcare facilities catering to the local population. The Primary Health Centre (PHC) is the main government medical facility in the area. Other notable healthcare institutions include the Airapuram Ayurvedic Hospital, the Mazhuvannoor Veterinary Hospital at Mangalathunada, and the Homeopathic Hospital at Nellad.

== Economy ==
The Agro Cooperative Society Market at Mangalathunada is well known for trading locally produced agricultural goods and supports the livelihood of many local farmers.

The Mazhuvannoor Service Co-operative Bank Ltd No. E-21, headquartered at South Mazhuvannoor, plays a vital role in supporting the local economy through agricultural loans, small-scale industry support, and financial inclusion. It operates branches in nearby areas such as Valamboor, promoting rural development and community welfare. Alongside it, the Airapuram Service Co-operative Bank also contributes significantly to the region’s economic growth and trade activities.
