= Kunnathunad Assembly constituency =

Constituency of the Kerala legislative assembly in India

Kunnathunad
- Constituency No. 84 for the Kerala Legislative Assembly

Constituency details
- Country: India
- Region: South India
- State: Kerala
- District: Ernakulam
- Established: 1965
- Total electors: 1,51,003 (2021)
- Reservation: SC

Member of Legislative Assembly
- 16th Kerala Legislative Assembly
- Incumbent V. P. Sajeendran
- Party: Indian National Congress
- Alliance: UDF
- Elected year: 2026

Kunnathunad is one of the 140 state legislative assembly constituencies in Kerala in southern India. It is also one of the seven state legislative assembly constituencies included in Chalakudy Lok Sabha constituency. As of the 2026 Assembly elections, the current MLA is V. P. Sajeendran of the INC.

== Local self-governed segments ==
Kunnathunad Assembly constituency is composed of the following local self-governed segments:

Sl no.	Name	Status (Grama panchayat/Municipality)	Taluk
1	Aikaranad	Grama panchayat	Kunnathunad
2	Kizhakkambalam	Grama panchayat	Kunnathunad
3	Kunnathunad	Grama panchayat	Kunnathunad
4	Mazhuvannoor	Grama panchayat	Kunnathunad
5	Poothrikka	Grama panchayat	Kunnathunad
6	Thiruvaniyoor	Grama panchayat	Kunnathunad
7	Vadavucode-Puthencruz	Grama panchayat	Kunnathunad
8	Vazhakulam	Grama panchayat	Kunnathunad

== Members of the Legislative Assembly ==
Election	Niyama Sabha	Name	Party	Tenure
1967	3rd	M. K. Krishnan	Communist Party of India	1967 – 1970
1970	4th	T. A. Paraman	Revolutionary Socialist Party	1970 – 1977
1977	5th	P. R. Esthose	Communist Party of India	1977 – 1980
1980	6th	P. R. Esthose	Communist Party of India	1980 – 1982
1982	7th	T. H. Mustafa	Indian National Congress	1982 – 1987
1987	8th	T. H. Mustafa	Indian National Congress	1987 – 1991
1991	9th	T. H. Mustafa	Indian National Congress	1991 – 1996
1996	10th	M. P. Varghese	Communist Party of India	1996 – 2001
2001	11th	T. H. Mustafa	Indian National Congress	2001 – 2006
2006	12th	M. M. Monayi	Communist Party of India	2006 – 2011
2011	13th	V. P. Sajeendran	Indian National Congress	2011 – 2016
2016	14th	V. P. Sajeendran	Indian National Congress	2016 – 2021
2021	15th	P. V. Srinijin	Communist Party of India	2021 – 2026
2026	16th	V. P. Sajeendran	Indian National Congress	2026 –

== Election results ==
Percentage change (±%) denotes the change in the number of votes from the immediately previous election.

=== 2026 ===
2026 Kerala Legislative Assembly election: Kunnathunad
Party	Candidate	Votes	%	±%
INC	V. P. Sajeendran	70,292	43.64	▲9.87
CPI(M)	P. V. Srinijin	49,009	30.43	▼3.34
TTP	Babu Divakaran	40,221	24.97	▼2.67
BSP	Manikuttan A. T.	380	0.24	
Independent	Vazhakulam Bhasi	212	0.13	
NOTA	None of the above	952	0.59	
Margin of victory		21,283	13.21	▲11.40
Turnout		1,61,066		
INC gain from CPI(M)		Swing	▲9.87	

=== 2021 ===
2021 Kerala Legislative Assembly election: Kunnathunad
Party	Candidate	Votes	%	±%
CPI(M)	P. V. Srinijin	51,180	33.77	▼8.55
INC	V. P. Sajeendran	48463	31.98	▼12.15
TTP	Dr. Sujith. P. Surendran	41890	27.64	New
BJP	Renu Suresh	7056	4.66	▼6.44
SDPI	Krishnan Eranhikal	1289	0.85	−
BSP	Manikuttan.A.T	197	0.13	−
Independent	Sujith.K.Surendran	761	0.50	−
Independent	Velayudhan.V.K	165	0.11	−
Margin of victory		2717	1.81	▼

=== 2016 ===
There were 1,72,595 registered voters in the constituency for the 2016 Kerala Assembly election.

2016 Kerala Legislative Assembly election: Kunnathunad
Party	Candidate	Votes	%	±%
INC	V. P. Sajendran	65,445	44.13	▼5.59
CPI(M)	Shiji Sivaji	62,766	42.32	▼0.57
BJP	Thuravoor Suresh	16,459	11.10	▲6.52
SP	N. O. Kuttapan	1,263	0.85	−
NOTA	None of the above	1,179	0.79	−
PDP	Orna Krishnankutty	653	0.44	−
Independent	Sajeendran Parappurath	436	0.29	−
CPI(ML)L	Manoj	116	0.08	−
Margin of victory		2,679	1.81	▼5.02
Turnout		1,48,317	85.93	▼2.34
INC hold		Swing	▼5.59	

=== 2011 ===
There were 1,53,102 registered voters in the constituency for the 2011 election.

2011 Kerala Legislative Assembly election: Kunnathunad
Party	Candidate	Votes	%	±%
INC	V. P. Sajendran	63,624	49.72	
CPI(M)	M .A. Surendran	54,892	42.89	
BJP	M. Ravi	5,862	4.58	
SDPI	M. K. Manoj Kumar	2,969	2.32	
BSP	Rajeev P. T.	625	0.49	−
Margin of victory		8,372	6.83	
Turnout		1,27,972	83.59	
INC gain from CPI(M)		Swing	{{{swing}}}	

== See also ==
- Kunnathunad
- Ernakulam district
- List of constituencies of the Kerala Legislative Assembly
- 2016 Kerala Legislative Assembly election
