= Rajarshi Memorial Higher Secondary School, Vadavucode =

Senior secondary school in Vadavucode, Kerala, India

Rajarshi Memorial Higher Secondary School

Location
- Vadavucode, Kerala; India
- Coordinates: 9.986°N 76.429°E

Information
- Type: Public Secondary
- Established: 1938
- School district: Ernakulam
- Grades: 5–12
- Enrollment: 1,817 (2009-10)
- Campus: Rural
- Website: RMHSS Vadavucode

Rajarshi Memorial Higher Secondary School is a senior secondary school situated in the village of Vadavucode, Kerala, India. The school was started by social worker Kadayath Pyli Abraham.

The teacher Sri K A Abraham, popularly known as Kurisinkal Abraham, was the son in law of the founder. He played a leadership role in the school during the 1960s till 1973. In 1969, Sri K A Abraham - then Head Master - was honoured by the country by selecting him as 'the best teacher of the year'. Sri V V Giri, President of India conferred on him the honour during the Independence Day celebrations at the Red Fort, New Delhi on 15 August 1969.

== History ==
The founder of Rajarshi Memorial Higher Secondary School was Kadayath Pyli Abraham. Alice Paul, daughter in law of Mr Kadyath Paili Abraham later became the principal of the school following his early demise in 1940. His daughter Dr Elizabeth was also the manager of the school. He came from a Syrian Christian family from Vadavucode. The ownership of the school was handed over to Catholicate and M D Schools corporate management by his son K A Paul in 1989.

The school was given the name of Rama Varma XV (27 December 1852 – 1932) (Raja Rama Varma), also known as Rajarshi, of Cochin state. Raja Rama Varma's son Rao Sahib I.N. Menon allowed starting an upper primary school at Vadavucode.

== Location ==
The school is situated in a small village, called Vadavucode, 21 km from Kochi. Nearest villages are Pancode, Puthencruz, Kolenchery.

== Courses ==
Upper primary and high school sections along with higher secondary courses under the following streams.

Biology Science	Commerce	Humanities
English	English	English
Hindi / Malayalam	Hindi / Malayalam	Hindi / Malayalam
Physics	Business Studies	History
Chemistry	Business Studies	Political Science
Biology	Computer Application	Sociology
Mathematics	Economics	Economics

Availability of seats in batches of higher secondary classes:

Batches	No of batches	No of seats	Govt. seats *	Community Quota seats **	Management seats ***
Biology Science	2	100	60	20	20
Commerce	1	50	30	10	10
Humanities	1	50	30	10	10
Total	4	200	120	40	40

* Including SC/ST and Sports Quota seats ** Reserved for Orthodox students on the basis of merit *** Admitted by a committee appointed by corporate manager

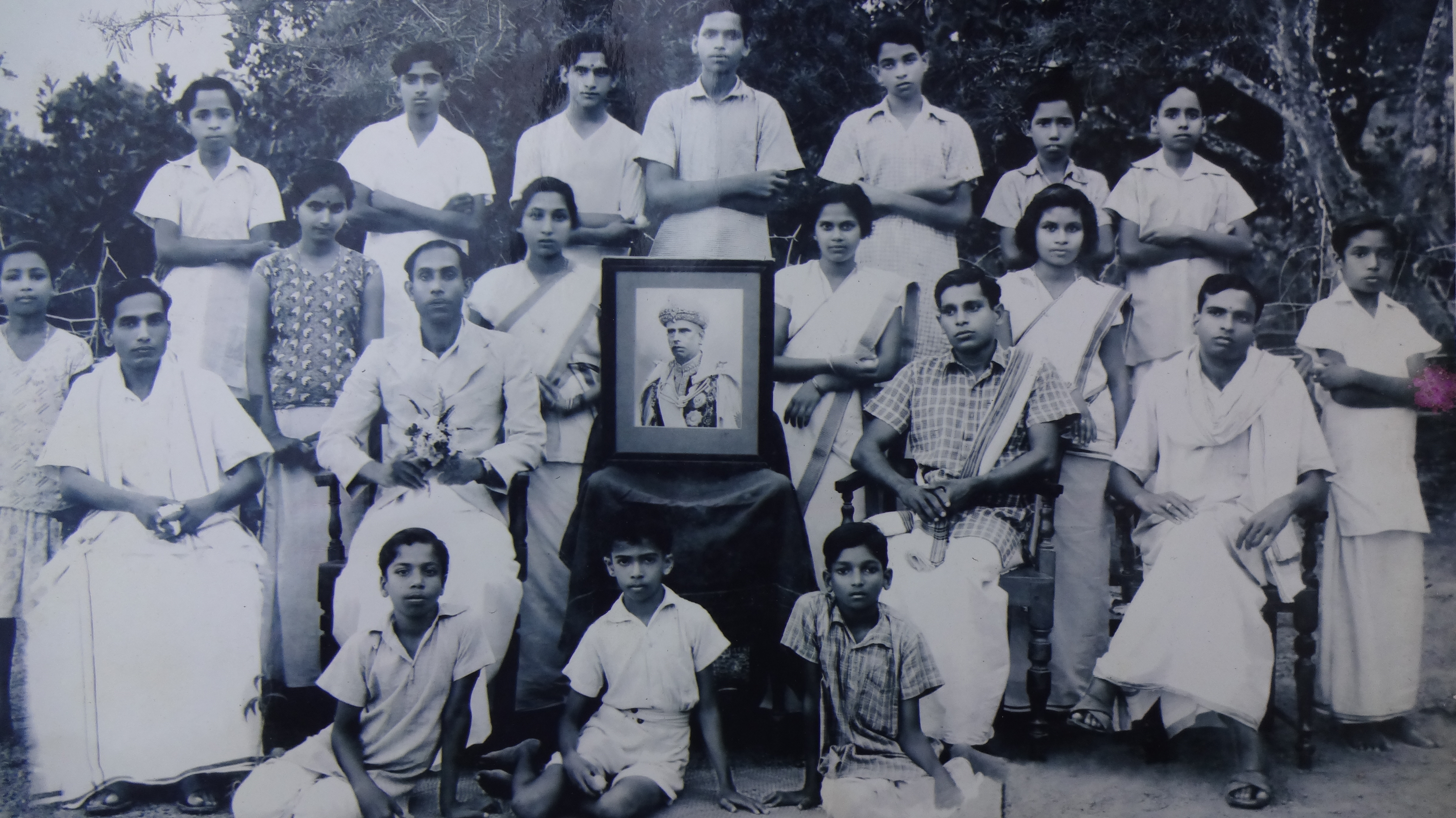
Teachers and students of the first upper primary batch (1939). First Row (sitting)P C Pathrose, Poothakuzhiyil Poulose, Name Unknown . The teachers (sitting) are P.P.Varghese, K.P. Abraham, Parangeth Paily Poulose, Mothaikkara Narayana Pillai. Third row(Standing) Name unknown, Name unknown, Mrs Sarakutty (Mrs K A Abraham), Puthedathil, Dr Elizabeth (Former Manager), K K Thomas (Kizhakkedath). K A Vargheese ( Kizhakkedath), MK Mathew(Maripadavil), Varrier, Fr CP Abraham, Name Unknown, MM Mathai, KP Ulahannan.

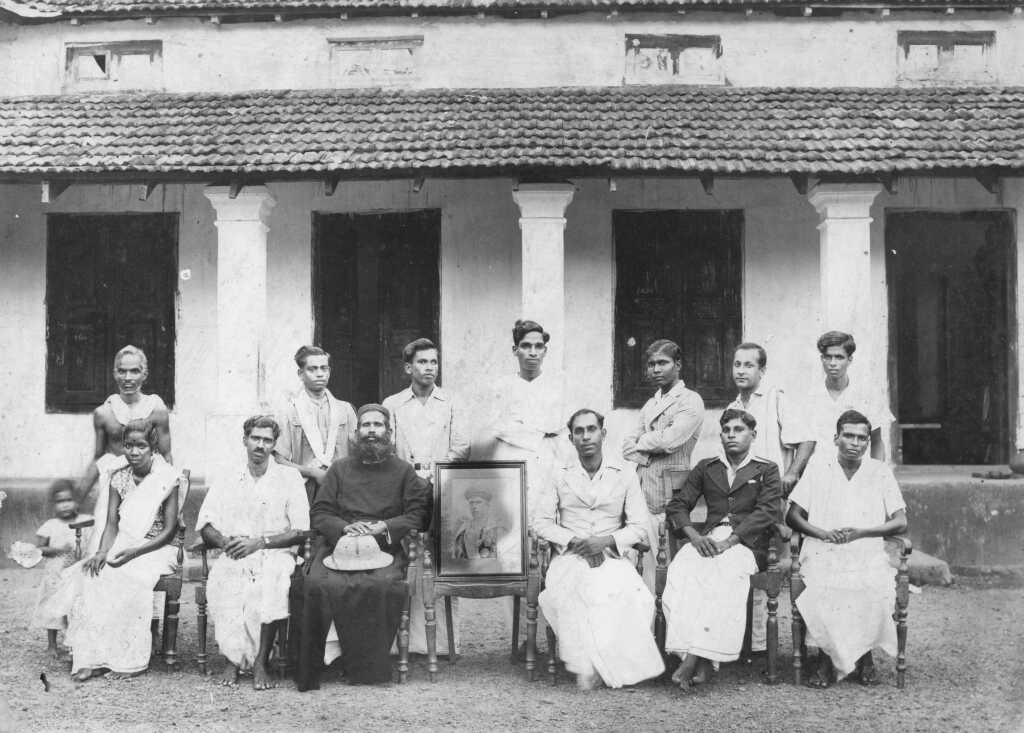
School staff, from the early 1940s

== See also ==
- Rajarshi Memorial Higher Secondary School, Aloor, Thrissur District
