= Kochi Outer Ring Road =

Proposed Ring Road in Kochi, Kerala, India

- കൊച്ചി ഔട്ടർ റിങ് റോഡ്

Route information
- Maintained by NHAI
- Length: 49.5 km (30.8 mi)

Major junctions
- South end: Aroor
- North end: Angamaly

Location
- Country: India
- Districts: Ernakulam
- Major cities: Kochi

Highway system
- Roads in India; Expressways; National; State; Asian

The Kochi Outer Ring Road is an approved eight-lane access-controlled ring road encircling the city of Kochi in Ernakulam district, Kerala, India.

Developed by the National Highways Authority of India (NHAI) under the PM Gati Shakti National Master Plan, the 49.5 km ring road connects Angamaly on NH 544 to Aroor on NH 66, bypassing the heavily congested urban core of Kochi (specifically the current Kochi Bypass stretch).

== Background ==
Angamali-Aluva-Edapally stretch and Edapally-Arur Bypass are a part of NH-544 and NH-66 respectively. Presently, the easy route for vehicles coming from Angamali to enter Alappuzha is by crossing the narrow Marthandavarma bridge at Aluva as well as Edappally, which is one of the busiest junctions in the state. There are also more than ten traffic signals on the 23 km stretch from Angamaly to Edappally. The Angamali–Kundannoor Bypass was proposed in order to reduce the traffic congestion in this stretch as well as to reduce the travelling time between Angamaly and Kundannoor. It is reported that while it takes up to an hour and a half to cover this distance on the existing national highway, the journey can be completed in half an hour through the new bypass.

== Overview ==
The proposed bypass will be 10 km inland from the existing route and will have no major towns or junctions. The project will be completed as a six lane greenfield highway by acquiring the land avoiding residential areas as much as possible. The bypass is expected to decongest Angamali, Aluva and the Kochi bypass. It will have service roads on both sides. According to reports, it will be constructed with underpasses completely avoiding junctions and signals. The preliminary alignment of the bypass was prepared with the help of a private agency. The central government gave approval for the construction of the bypass in December 2022.

== Route description ==
The 49.5 km highway starts from Karayamparampu in Angamaly and passes through 17 villages in Aluva, Kunnathunad and Kanayannoor taluks. It runs parallel to the MC road along the southern side and passes through Marampally and Ponjassery regions and passes through Pattimatam. A new six-lane bridge will also be constructed across Periyar river. From here, moving southwards, it will cross the existing NH-85 near Puthankurish and turn in a westerly direction. It then runs south of Tripunithura and reach Kundannoor to join the current NH-66. The proposed Kochi-Theni Industrial Corridor will meet at Puthencruz on this highway.

== See also ==
- Kochi Bypass
