= Blandevar =

Blandevar ബ്ലാണ്ടേവർ
- Village
- Interactive map of Blandevar
- Coordinates: 10.0°N 76.428°E
- Country: India
- State: Kerala
- District: Ernakulam
- Elevation: 81 m (266 ft)

Population (2001)
  - Total: 11,271 (7km2)

Languages
  - Official: Malayalam, English
- Time zone: UTC+5:30 (IST)
- PIN: 686689
- Telephone code: 91 484 276
- Vehicle registration: KL-40

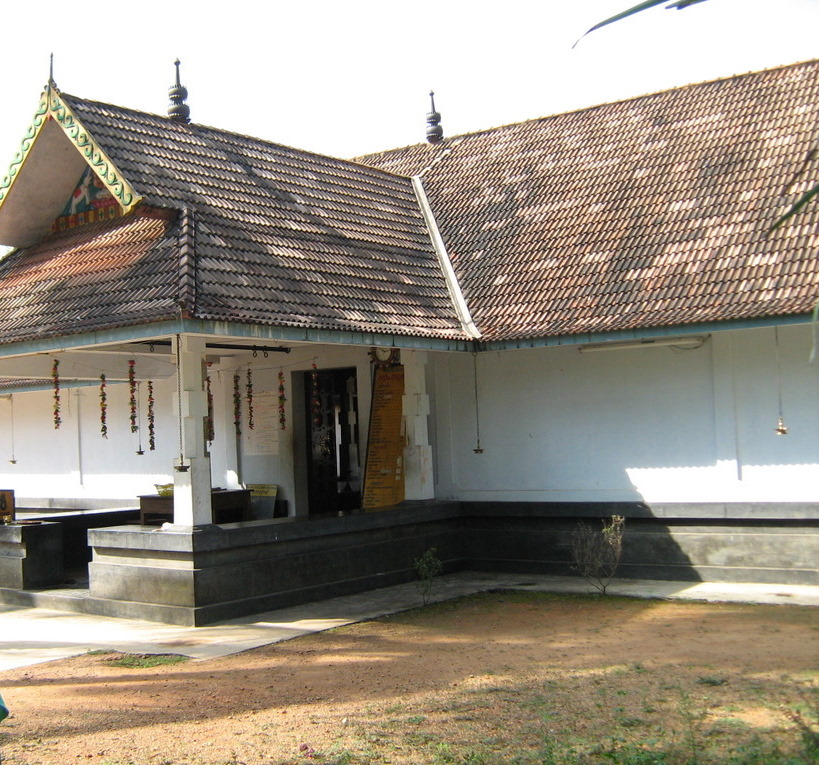
Kavipallathu Siva Temple

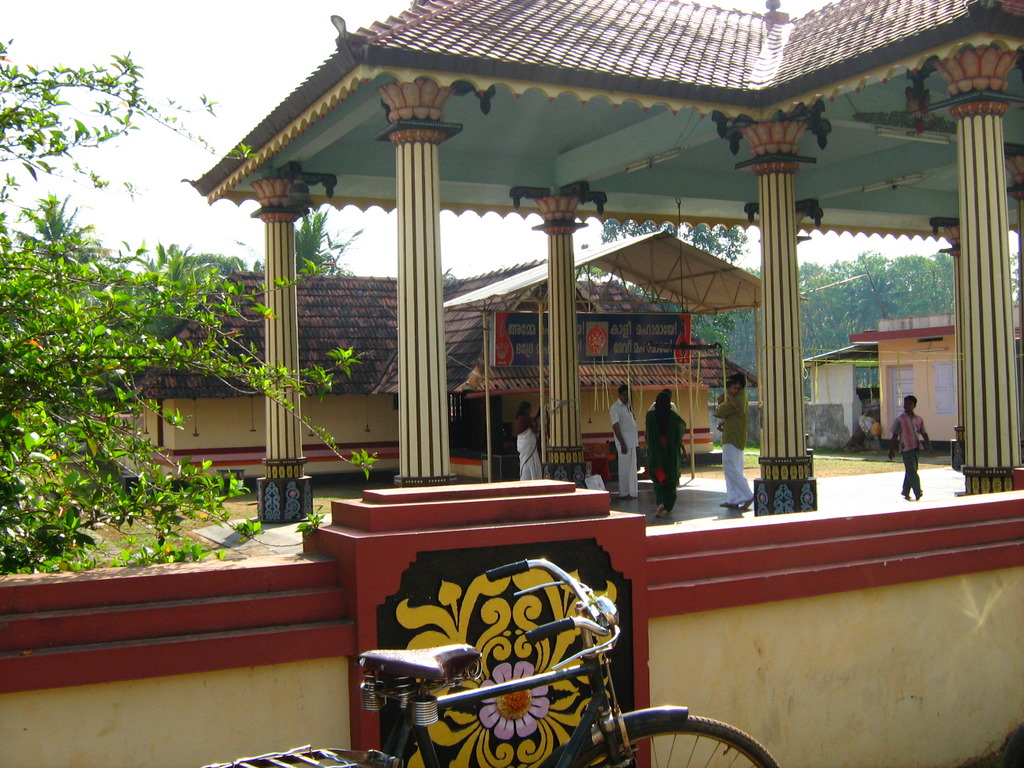
Irapuram Bhagavathi Temple

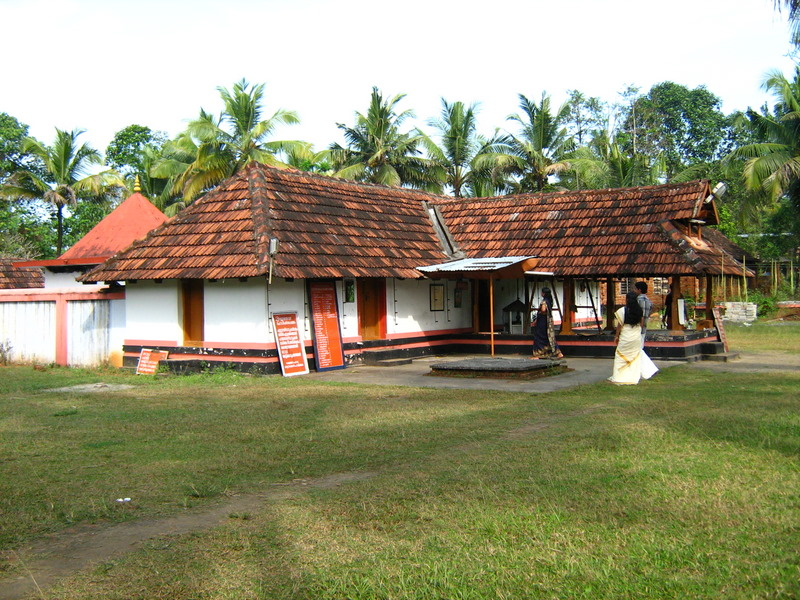
Blandevar Temple

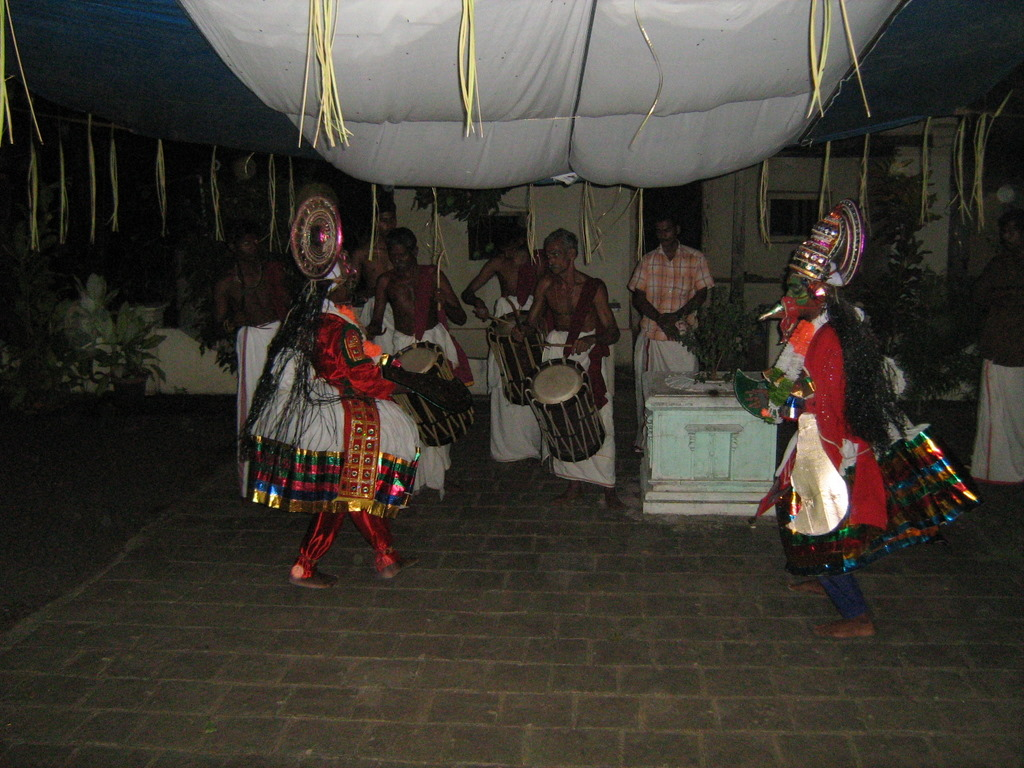
Garudan Thookkam

Blandevar is a small village in the North Mazhuvannoor area of the Ernakulam district of India. The renowned Blandevar Mahavishnu Temple is located here.

The area is mainly agricultural with the main crops being rice, coconut, rubber and pineapple. Mazhuvannoor panchayath and the village offices are situated at Irapuram.

== Educational institutions ==
- Govt UP School N. Mazhuvannoor
- Govt LP School Irapuram
- Sree Narayana Engineering college, Kadayiruppu – 6 km
- MOSC medical college Kolenchery – 7 km
- Sree Sankara Arts college, Irapuram – 4 km
- Christknowledgecity engineering college – 3 km
- C.E.T. College of Management, Science and Technology and International School – 2 km
- Jai Bharath Group of Institutions – 6 km

== Cultural centers ==
- Gramadeepam Library
- GDM arts and sports club
- Kilimugal arts and sports club
- New millennium arts and sports club, Double canal Jn.

=== Blandevar Mahavishnu Temple ===
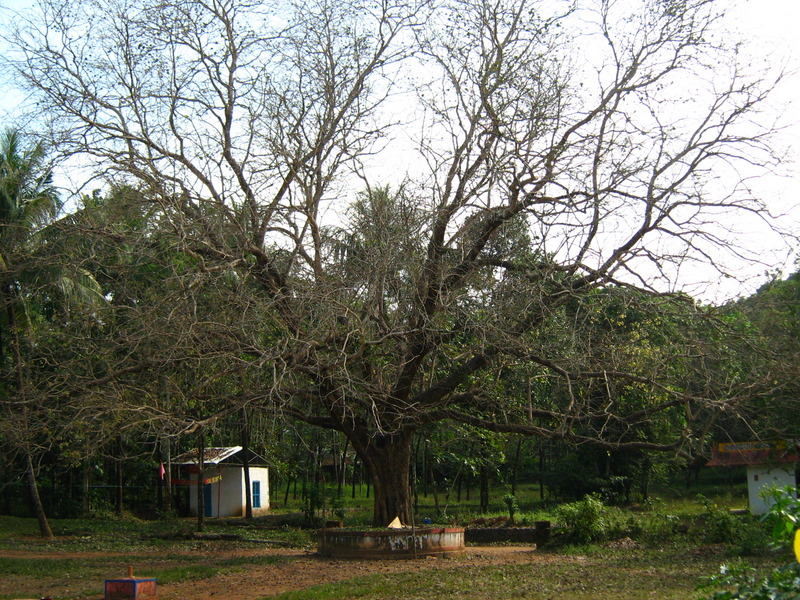
Big banyan tree in front of Blandevar Temple

The yearly festival starts in the "atham" in the "kumbham" malayalan month. The six-day festival is celebrated by all the villagers without any caste difference. The name 'blandevar' is derived from an incident where the idol of the blandevar temple was found from inside a Jackfruit tree (പ്ലാവ്).

=== Irapuram Bhagavathi Temple ===
The Irapuram Bhagavathi Temple is an ancient temple which attracts many devotees in every year. The main festival is in the bharani day of the kumbham malayalan month. The main adoration here is Garudan Thookkam. Every year more than 100 garudan thookkam will be presented by devotees. The second main festival here is "Pathamudayam" to celebrate the fight between Kali and Darika in purana.

=== Kavipallathu Siva Temple ===
The Kavipallathu Siva Temple is an ancient temple which has been recently renovated. This is the main siva temple in the North Mazhuvannoor area and is situated near to Kilikulam junction.

=== Mootherikkavu Bhagavathi Temple ===
This temple is located in Thattamugal. The main festival is kalamezhuthum pattu and guruthi.

=== Thattamugal St. Mary's Jacobite Syrian Chappel ===
St. Mary's Jacobite Syrian Chapel is the main Christian church in the North Mazhuvannoor area. It attracts many devotees every year. Feasts are celebrated without caste difference. The holy remains of St. Elias third highlights the blessings of place.

== Hospitals ==
The nearest hospitals are the Government health center at Irapuram, the MOSC medical college 7 km away and the Pazhanganadu Samarittan hospital which is 10 km away.

== Nearest places ==
The nearest railway stations are 25 km away at Aluva or 30 km away at Ernakulam. The nearest airport is Cochin International Airport, Nedumbassery about 24 km away. Blandevar is 6 km from the Thiruvananthapuram – Angamaly state highway to the north and 6 km from the Ernakulam – Madurai national highway to the south.

The nearest villages are:

- Ernakulam 30 km
- Aluva 25 km
- Perumbavoor 12 km
- Muvattupuzha 10 km
- Kolenchery 7 km
- Valayanchirangara 4 km
