= Pancode =

- village
- Location in Kerala, India Pancode (India)
- Coordinates: 9°59′20″N 76°26′25″E
- Country: India
- State: Kerala
- District: Ernakulam

Languages Malayalam
  - Official: Malayalam, English
- Time zone: UTC+5:30 (IST)
- PIN: 682310
- Vehicle registration: KL-17
- Nearest city: Kolencherry, Vadavucode, pattimattom, perumbavoor, Cochin
- Sex ratio: 1000 ♂/♀
- Literacy: 99.9%%
- Lok Sabha constituency: Chalakudy
- Legislative Assembly: Kunnathunad

Pancode is a small village in Ernakulam district of the state of Kerala in India. Pancode is just 16 km away from the prestigious Smart City Project and InfoPark, Kochi.

== Geography ==
The postal area Pin Code is

Neighbouring places of Pancode are

- Kadayiruppu – 2 km away
- Puthencruz – 3 km away
- Vadavucode – 2 km away
- Kolenchery – 3 km away
- Pattimattom – 3 km away
- Pallikkara – 7 km away
- Kizhakkambalam – 7 km away
- Perumbavoor – 16 km
- Moovattupuzha – 16 km
- Kakkanad – 16 km
- Tripunithura – 16 km

== Buildings and economoy ==
Government offices in Pancode are limited to an LP school, a post office, Milk Society, Cooperative Bank, veterinary hospital and a Maveli store. Subramnia Swamy Temple and Thiruvalukunnathu Temple, edassery kavu panchamoorty temple, Kalari sree durga temple are the four famous temples in Pancode. Iruppachira is the main junction of Pancode.

There is a private limited company named Sunlit Electro Controls. Herbal Isolates Private Limited, Symega Food Ingredients Limited are other two major private institutions in the village.

The village is adjacent to the Cochin Infopark.

In 2023, a large kitchen and food manufacture facility was opened in the village by the Kerala Minister for Health and Family Welfare Veena George.

== Religion ==
The Subramanya Swami temple is in Pancode (dedicated to Lord Subramanya Swam). Makara Pooyam festival in Pancode temple is one of the spiritual attractions, and foreigners visit the village during the festive seasons.

There is an Orthodox Syrian Church in Pancode, the Saint John Malankara church.
