= Thuruthiply =

Thuruthiply തുരുത്തിപ്ലി
- town
- Location in Kerala, India Thuruthiply (India)
- Coordinates: 10.086°N 76.48°E
- Country: India
- State: Kerala
- District: Ernakulam

Languages
  - Official: Malayalam, English
- Time zone: UTC+5:30 (IST)
- Vehicle registration: KL-40/41

Thuruthiply is a town in Kunnathunad Taluk of Ernakulam district in the Indian state of Kerala. It is near Allapra on Perumbavoor-Kolenchery road. Thuruthiply is famous for its St. Mary's Jacobite Syrian church.

== Organizations ==
- St. Mary's College of Commerce and Management Studies
- St.Mary's Public School Thuruthiply

== Religious places ==
- St. Mary's Jacobite Syrian Church, Thuruthiply
- Mar Thoman Jacobite Syrian Church, Thuruthiply
