= Mannoor, Ernakulam =

Mannoor
- village
- Location in Kerala, India Mannoor (India)
- Coordinates: 10°2′0″N 76°32′0″E
- Country: India
- State: Kerala
- District: Ernakulam

Languages
  - Official: Malayalam, English
- Time zone: UTC+5:30 (IST)
- PIN: 683541
- Telephone code: 0484
- Vehicle registration: KL-17
- Nearest city: Muvattupuzha / Perumbavoor
- Lok Sabha constituency: Kunnathunaadu

Mannoor is a village near Muvattupuzha in Irapuram, Kunnathunad, Ernakulam in the Indian state of Kerala. Mannoor is located 10 km away from Perumbavoor and 8 km from Muvattupuzha.
