= Thamarachal =

Thamarachal Thamarachalpuram
- Village
- Location in Kerala, India Thamarachal (India)
- Coordinates: 10.043°N 76.403°E
- Country: India
- State: Kerala
- District: Ernakulam

Languages
  - Official: Malayalam, English
- Time zone: UTC+5:30 (IST)
- PIN: 683562
- Telephone code: 0484
- Vehicle registration: KL-40/41

Thamarachal (alternately Thamarachalpuram or Thamarachal Puram) is a town in Kizhakkambalam panchayath near city of Kochi, India. Thamarachal is where road from Oorakkad and Malayidomthuruth make a junction on road from Pukkattupadi to Kizhakkambalam.

== Organizations ==
- KG PACKERS, Manufacturers of Corrugated Boxes Since 1999, Thamarachal.
- St Mary's Public School
- International School-The Charter School Kochi
- Samaritan College of Nursing, Pazhanganad, near Kakkanad, Kochi

== Religious places ==
- St Mary's Jacobite Valiyapally, Thamarachal,
- Sacred Heart Syro Malabar Catholic church, Thamarachal
- St. Augustine's Syro Malabar Catholic Church, Pazhanganad, Kochi

== Hospitals ==
- Samaritan Heart Institute, Pazhanganad, near Kakkanad, Kochi
