= Vengoor West =

- village
- Location in Kerala, India Vengoor West (India)
- Coordinates: 10.1417034°N 76.5199195°E
- Country: India
- State: Kerala
- District: Ernakulam
- Taluk: Kunnathunad
- Elevation: 28 m (92 ft)

Population (2011)
  - Total: 17,355
- Time zone: UTC+5:30 (IST)
- 2011 census code: 627944

Vengoor West is a village in the Ernakulam district of Kerala, India. It is located in the Kunnathunad taluk.

== Demographics ==
According to the 2011 census of India, Vengoor West has 4448 households. The literacy rate of the village is 87.23%.

Demographics (2011 Census)
| | Total | Male | Female |
|---|---|---|---|
| Population | 17355 | 8615 | 8740 |
| Children aged below 6 years | 1429 | 757 | 672 |
| Scheduled caste | 2786 | 1377 | 1409 |
| Scheduled tribe | 10 | 5 | 5 |
| Literates | 15139 | 7642 | 7497 |
| Workers (all) | 7125 | 4897 | 2228 |
| Main workers (total) | 5909 | 4323 | 1586 |
| Main workers: Cultivators | 737 | 622 | 115 |
| Main workers: Agricultural labourers | 860 | 501 | 359 |
| Main workers: Household industry workers | 76 | 54 | 22 |
| Main workers: Other | 4236 | 3146 | 1090 |
| Marginal workers (total) | 1216 | 574 | 642 |
| Marginal workers: Cultivators | 153 | 61 | 92 |
| Marginal workers: Agricultural labourers | 305 | 152 | 153 |
| Marginal workers: Household industry workers | 24 | 7 | 17 |
| Marginal workers: Others | 734 | 354 | 380 |
| Non-workers | 10230 | 3718 | 6512 |

== Notable institutions ==
Vengoor has 2 major religious centers one being the Mar Kauma Church which is one among the ancient churches of the Syrian Christians in Kerala, being established on 1870 and other being Vengoor Durga Devi temple.
