= Rama Varma XV =

- Maharaja of Cochin
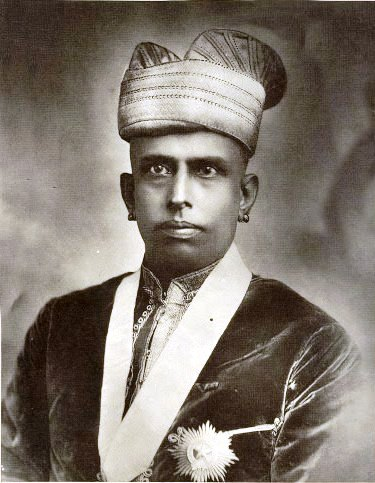
- Rama Varma XV
- Reign: 1895–1914
- Born: 1852
- Died: 1932 (aged 79–80)
- Religion: Hinduism

Sir Sri Rama Varma XV GCSI GCIE (1852–1932), known as the Rajarshi of Cochin and as Ozhinja Valiya Thampuran (Abdicated Highness), was the ruler of the Kingdom of Cochin from 1895 to 1914.

== Reign ==
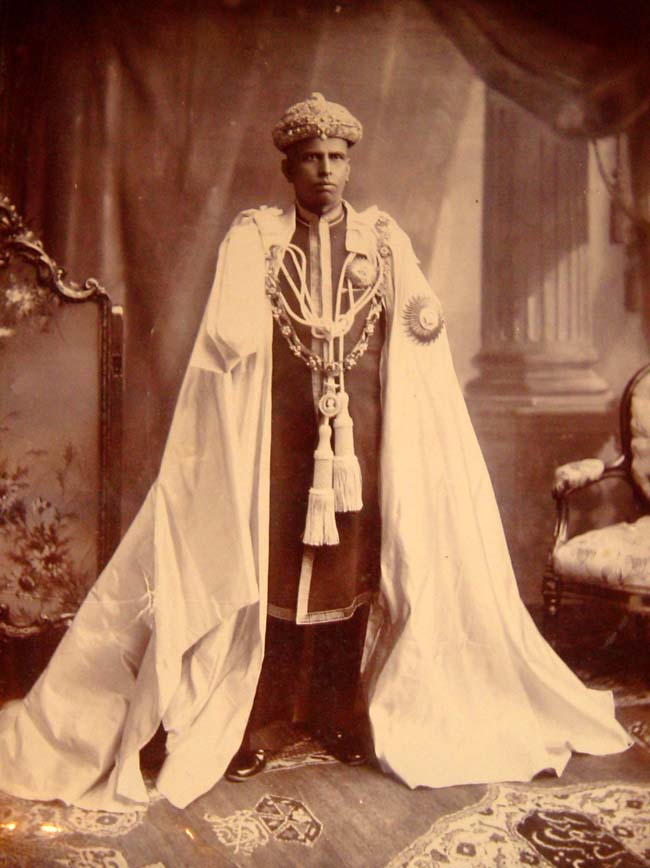
H H Raja of Cochin at the Delhi Durbar in 1903

In 1897, Rama Varma was appointed by British government as a Knight Commander of the Order of the Star of India (KCSI). He was the ruler when Viceroy Lord Curzon visited kingdom of Cochin in 1900. In January 1903 he attended the Delhi Durbar to commemorate the accession to the throne of King Edward VII, and he received the Delhi Durbar Medal. In the accompanying 1903 Durbar Honours he was promoted by British government as a Knight Grand Commander of the Order of the Star of India (GCSI). In 1905 Rama Varma was heavily involved in the Smarthavicharam trial of Kuriyedath Thāthri, rumour has it that the King abruptly ended the trial because he believed he would be the 65th name to be revealed as one of Thathri's partners. In 1906, Rama Varma visited Prince and Princess of Wales in Madras and later received a return visit from them.

Rama Varma abdicated the throne in 1914. He died in January 1932 at his summer residence in Thrissur. He was cremated with full state honours in the premises of his home. Both his palace and resting place are now situated in the premises of Sree Kerala Varma College, made by and named after Kerala Varma VII. His name was given to several educational institutions in the Cochin state like the one in Vadavucode named Rajarshi Memorial Higher Secondary school Vadavucode and Rajarshi Memorial Higher Secondary school, Alloor.

== Personal life ==
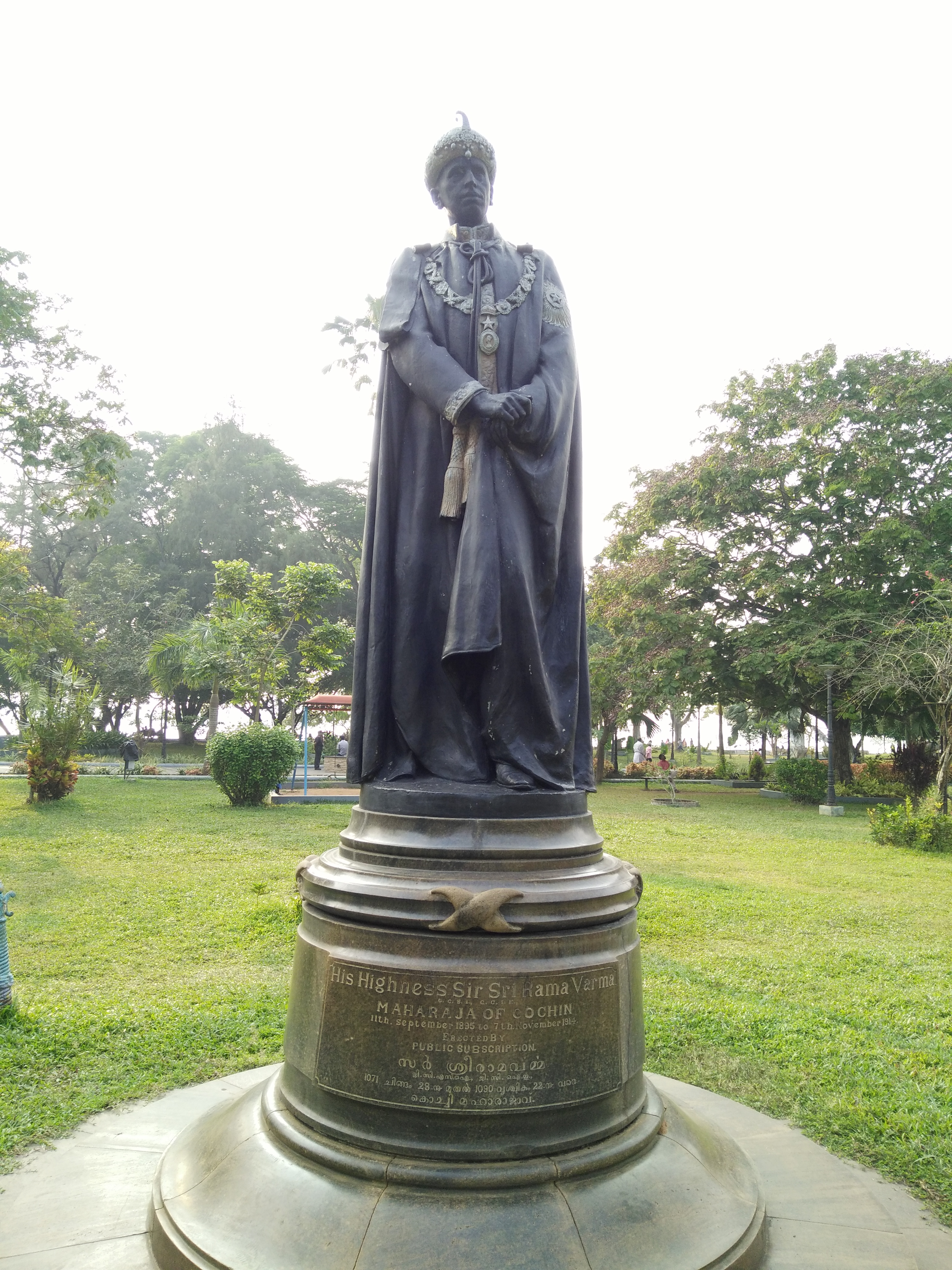
Statue of Rama Varma XV at Subhash Park, Ernakulam.

Rama Varma XV had married twice, his first marriage did not last for long due to the death of his wife. His second wife was Ittyanath Madathil Parukutty a member of the Ittyanath Family from Villadam, Thrissur. Parukutty was his Nethyaramma there after. He also happens to be the step father of Ittyanath Madathil Madhavi (wife of Rama Varma Parikshith Thampuran).

Parukutty was a widow herself before her marriage to Rama Varma XV and had a girl child from that marriage. As it's a custom then to leave children from earlier marriage at one's ancestral home Parukutty did the same after her marriage to Rama Varma XV. Upon her arrival at the Palace in Tripunithura, Rama Varma XV enquired about the child. When he heard about the child from Parukutty, he ordered that the child should be brought to the Palace at once. Later this child was destined to become a Nethyaramma herself after her marriage to Rama Varma Parikshith Thampuran.

Regnal titles
Preceded by Kerala Varma V	Maharaja of Cochin; 1895–1914	Succeeded by Rama Varma XVI
