= Ponjassery =

- village
- Location in Kerala, India Ponjassery (India)
- Coordinates: 10.091°N 76.443°E
- Country: India
- State: Kerala
- District: Ernakulam

Languages
  - Official: Malayalam, English
- Time zone: UTC+5:30 (IST)
- PIN: 683547
- Vehicle registration: KL-40

Ponjassery is a town in Vengola Village in Kunnathunad Taluk of Ernakulam district in the Indian state of Kerala. It is on Aluva-Munnar Highway(SH-16) between Perumbavoor and Aluva. There are three junctions in Ponjassery, one is the road to Vengola and other one is to Kizhakkambalam another one is Mudikkal .Ponjassery is coming under the administration of Vengola Grama Panjayath. Ponjassery is the Ward No. 1 of Vengola Grama Panjayath. Ponjassery is known for its secular feature. There is a Worship centre in Ponjassery, Near My Castle Apartments, Pattippara - Madathippady Road.

== Religious places ==
1)Worship centre Ponjassery, Near My Castle Apartments, Pattippara - Madathippady Road.

== Hospitals ==
1. V M J Hospital, West Vengola, Hydrose Nagar 2. Bharath Hospital, Chembarakky 3.Rajagiri Hospital.
