= Aikaranad South =

- village
- Location in Kerala, India Aikaranad South (India)
- Coordinates: 9.9748000°N 76.4672090°E
- Country: India
- State: Kerala
- District: Ernakulam

Population (2011)
  - Total: 21,053

Languages
  - Official: Malayalam, English
- Time zone: UTC+5:30 (IST)
- Vehicle registration: KL

Aikaranad South is a village in Ernakulam district in the Indian state of Kerala. Aikaranad South is also known as Poothrikka. It is situated in Kunnathunad Tehsil near to Kolenchery town and is part of a minor eastern suburb of Cochin. Aikaranad South is situated 28Kms away from Kakkanad, district headquarters of Ernakulam District.

== Demographics ==
As of 2011 India census, Aikaranad South had a population of 21053 with 10396 males and 10657 females.
