= Malayidomthuruth =

Malayidomthuruth Malayidom Thuruthu, Malayidam Thuruth
- town
- Location in Kerala, India Malayidomthuruth (India)
- Coordinates: 10.073°N 76.413°E
- Country: India
- State: Kerala
- District: Ernakulam

Languages
  - Official: Malayalam, English
- Time zone: UTC+5:30 (IST)
- PIN: 683561
- Telephone code: 0484268****
- Vehicle registration: KL-40/41

Malayidomthuruth (also written as Malayidam Thuruthu) is a town in Kizhakkambalam panchayath near city of Kochi, India. Malayidomthuruth is where road from Oorakkad and Thamarachal make a junction on road from Pukkattupadi to Chembarakky.

== Organizations ==
- Malayidom Thuruth Service Co-operative Society
- Malayidom Thuruth Service Co-operative Bank
- Malayidomthuruth Police Station
- Malayidomthuruth Government LP School
- Malayidomthuruth Public Library
- Malayidomthuruth Co-operative Supermarket (MALCO)
- E Seva Centre (Common Service Center)

== Religious places ==
- St. Mary's Jacobite Syrian Church, Malayidomthuruth
- St. George Chapel, Malayidomthuruth
- Muhiyadheen Juma Masjid, Malayidomthuruth
- Kottumkulathukavu temple
- Edanakavu temple

== Hospitals ==
- Primary Health Centre, Malayidamthuruth
