= Arakapady =

Arackappady
- Village
- Location in Kerala, India Arackappady (India)
- Coordinates: 10.0598671°N 76.4592007°E
- Country: India
- State: Kerala
- District: Ernakulam
- Taluk: Kunnathunad
- Elevation: 33 m (108 ft)

Population (2011)
  - Total: 17,779
- Time zone: UTC+5:30 (IST)
- 2011 census code: 627947

Arackappady is a village in the Ernakulam district of Kerala, India. It is located in the Kunnathunad taluk.

== Demographics ==
According to the 2011 census of India, Arakapady has 4213 households. The literacy rate of the village is 84.1%.

Demographics (2011 Census)
	Total	Male	Female
Population	17779	8920	8859
Children aged below 6 years	1845	923	922
Scheduled caste	2032	997	1035
Scheduled tribe	141	65	76
Literates	14952	7704	7248
Workers (all)	6675	5135	1540
Main workers (total)	5746	4594	1152
Main workers: Cultivators	540	455	85
Main workers: Agricultural labourers	259	181	78
Main workers: Household industry workers	83	73	10
Main workers: Other	4864	3885	979
Marginal workers (total)	929	541	388
Marginal workers: Cultivators	165	118	47
Marginal workers: Agricultural labourers	150	91	59
Marginal workers: Household industry workers	15	1	14
Marginal workers: Others	599	331	268
Non-workers	11104	3785	7319
