= Kurumbakkavu Bhagavathy Temple Edathala =

- city
- Location in Kerala, India
- Coordinates: 10°4′2″N 76°21′54″E
- Country: India
- State: Kerala
- District: Ernakulam

Languages
  - Official: Malayalam, English
- Time zone: UTC+5:30 (IST)
- ISO 3166 code: IN-KL
- Website: www.kurumbakkavuedathala.org

Edathala's Sree Kurumbakkavu Bhagavathy Temple is in a village that is 8 km from Aluva Railway station and 20 km from Cochin international Airport.

The Divine Mother known as Kurumbakavilamma is worshiped here as the main deity. Apart from the main deity, the temple complex consists of a temple for Sastha, peedam for Nagas, Khandakarnan, Rakshas and Kshetrapalakan.

Meena Bharani, the birthday of Kurumbakavilamma, is the most important festival of the temple and is celebrated on "Bharani Nakshatram" in Meenam (March/April). The temple also has special poojas in Karkidakam with the chanting of the holy scripture Ramayanam daily, Navaratri poojas, Mandala pooja followed by Sashtampaatu in Vrischikam.

The temple is located in Kunjattukara.

== See also ==
- Temples of Kerala
