= Edathala =

- Grama panchayat
- Location in Kerala, India
- Coordinates: 10.0297°N 76.3197°E
- Country: India
- State: Kerala
- District: Ernakulam

Government
  - Body: Grama panchayath

Area
  - Total: 34.99 km^{2} (13.51 sq mi)

Population (2011)
  - Total: 77,811
  - Density: 2,224/km^{2} (5,760/sq mi)

Languages
  - Official: Malayalam, English
- Time zone: UTC+5:30 (IST)
- Postal code: 683561
- Vehicle registration: KL-41 Aluva

Edathala is a gram panchayat near Aluva town. It is also a village in Aluva taluk of Ernakulam district, in the state of Kerala, India.

== History ==
About 300 years ago, Padamattam was the place where the Lord King of Edappally fought against Kalathil Kartha. The South Indian Armory of the Indian Navy is located near the battlefield. The Pengatussery mosque and Kuzhivelippady Juma masjid which was established 172 years ago are the places of worship of the Muslim community. There are many masjids here. Launched in 1928, the Scab Fence Math and its adjacent destitute house are services. The Yattikhana, founded by Kurupali Mustafa Sahib in honor of his father, is one of the prominent religious institutions in the region. Ayurvedic physicians Pukkottil Madhava Vaidyar and SD Pharmacy have worked in their respective fields. Ayurvedic Unani Homeopathic Allopathic Medical Center is located here. Various rituals, such as untouchability, and superstitions, such as myths, existed. Serpents can be seen in most Nair homes. There is a form of worship called the frequent version. There are folk art forms like Pulluvanpattu, Onapattu, Nattuppattu, Thigh-throbbing Sastham Pattu, Kokkali and Oppana. With the advent of concrete buildings, the old architectural style of architecture has gone. There are only a handful of old-fashioned squares, and the family still lives on the floor. The legendary Pinot temple associated with the Chottanikkara Temple, the Kurumbakkavu, Kunjattu, Mukkottil, Kuzikkattu, Thottiyil, Potachira, Karukapilli, Mattappilli, Valliyamman, Puthupara Ayyappaswamy and many other old temple festivals are served by the panchayat. Once upon a time, a very big festival was held at the Pinat Bhagwati Temple. Situated at the confluence of Muslim warriors who fought with their enemies, the Peyangattussery Shaheedanar Siyaram is still a place of pilgrimage. The Centennial Mosque is home to several mosques in Mulepally, Nochima, Kodikuthumala and St. Jude Church in eight acres.

== Demographics ==
As of 2011 India census, Edathala had a total population of 77,811. Males constitute 38,454 (49.41%) of the population and females 39,357 (50.58%). Edathala has an average literacy rate of 82%; 64,450 of 77,811 are literate. The literacy rate is higher than the national average of 59.5% and male literacy is 84%, female literacy is 81%. In Edathala, 11% (8,772) of the population is under 6 years of age. 70% of population belongs to the middle class.

Chunangamvely is a village located near Edathala. Pukkattupady is one of the most popular and busy junctions in Edathala.

== Educational institutions ==
There are many schools in Edathala. Swamy gopalananda Theertha Saraswathy Vidyanikethan, Al Hind Public School, Al-Ameen International Public School, St. Joseph Public School, Manalimukku, Abdulla Haji Ahmed Sait Memorial KMEA Al-Manar Higher Secondary School, KNM MES high school, Govt Higher secondary school Kunjattukara are some among them.

MES College For Advanced Studies is a college in Edathala. KMEA engineering college, is also situated in Kuzhivelipady in Edathala. The KMEA College of Architecture and the KMEA College of Arts And Science is also located on the Kuzhivelipady campus. AL-Ameen College is also located in Edathala.

== Facilities ==
Edathala service co-op bank, State Bank of India (formerly State Bank of Travancore) and Federal Bank provide all the necessary banking facilities.

SOS and MES orphanage are some charity organizations operating in Edathala.

Cochin International Airport is hardly 20 km away from Edathala.

Rajagiri Hospital is situated in Edathala panchayath.

=== Industries ===
Royal Plastic Industries, a leader in plastic flower pots; Hi-Tech Engineering, a forerunner in structural fabrication situated at Pukkattupady. Tollins tyres, Vysali pharmaceuticals, Karothukuzhi plastics, PEEJAY Tubes are also situated in Edathala.

=== Worship places ===
Kuzhivelipady Muslim Jamaath, MalayilPalli Muslim Jamaath and Pengattusseri Muslim Jammaath are the main Jama Masji in Edathala Panachayath.

There are a lot of masjids situated in Edathala Grama Panchayat. A few of them are:

1. Hayatul Islam Masjid, Njarakkattumoola
2. Mahdanul Islam Masjid, Maidanimugal
3. Central Juma Masjid, Malekkapady
4. Juma Masjid, kuzhikkattukara
5. Huda Muslim Jama ath, Nalammile

Edathala Panchayath has many Devi Temples. Some of them are
Edathala Sree Painaatu Durga Temple
Sree Kurumbakkavu Bhagavathy Temple Edathala
Edathala Sree Kunjatu Bhagavathy Temple
Edathala Sree Koothanali Bhagavathy temple
Edathala Sree Mattapilly Bhagavathy Temple
Edathala Sree Karukapilly Bhagavathy Temple
Edathala Sree Vettakkorumakan Temple
Edathala Sree Thuruthi Bhagavathy Temple
Edathala Pirali Sree Dharma Sastha Bhagavathy Temple
Edathala Sree Kuzhikattukavu Bhagavathy Temple
Edathala Mukkottil Temple
Valliyamma kovil (Sree Subrahmanya Temple)
