= P. V. Srinijin =

Indian politician

Adv. P. V. Srinijin MLA

Member of the Kerala Legislative Assembly
- In office 24 May 2021 – 23 May 2026
- Preceded by: V. P. Sajeendran
- Succeeded by: V. P. Sajeendran
- Constituency: Kunnathunad

Personal details
- Born: Kerala, India
- Party: Communist Party of India (Marxist) (2016–present); Indian National Congress (1997, 2011)
- Relatives: K. G. Balakrishnan (father-in-law)
- Education: Bachelor of Arts; Bachelor of Laws; Master of Laws
- Alma mater: Mahatma Gandhi University, Kerala; University of Northampton, England

P. V. Sreenijin is an Indian politician who served as the MLA of Kunnathunad constituency from 24 May 2021 to 23 May 2026. In the 2021 Kerala Legislative Assembly election, he won by a margin of 2,715 votes, defeating V. P. Sajeendran of the UDF. With a vote percentage of just 33.79%, he won with the lowest winning vote percentage in the election overall.

In 2006, Srinijan contested as the Indian National Congress candidate in the Njarakkal (Now Vypin) Assembly constituency but unfortunately lost the election. Subsequently, he left INC and became a member of CPIM and ran for election in the Kunnathunad assembly constituency, where he was elected as an MLA for the term 2021-2026.

He obtained his BA LLB degree from Mahatma Gandhi University Kottayam, Kerala. Subsequently, he earned a Master of Law from the University of Northampton, England. He wed K B Sony, the daughter of K G Balakrishnan, who previously served as the Chief Justice of India.
