= Kuzhivelipady Muslim Jamaath =

Village in Kerala, India

Kuzhivelipady
- Muslim Jamaat
- Country: India
- State: Kerala
- District: Ernakulam

Government
  - Body: Grama Panchayath

Area
  - Total: 3.2 km^{2} (1.2 sq mi)

Languages
  - Official: Malayalam, English
- Time zone: UTC+5:30 (IST)
- Postal code: 683561
- Vehicle registration: KL-41 Aluva

Kuzhivelipady is a small village/hamlet in the Vazhakkulam block in the Ernakulam District of the Indian state of Kerala. The village belongs to the Central Kerala Division and is located 28 km due east from district headquarters Kakkanad (218 km from Thiruvananthapuram).

Kuzhivelipady Muslim Jamaath (KMJ) undertakes a major big Convention Center which is named as KMJ Convention Center. There is Dharaz (A common word used for Islamic Educational Academy. It is an Arabic word.) runs under KMJ.

== KMJ Convention Center Kuzhivelipady ==
It is a major convention center in the Edathala Grama Panchayat. It is a spacious conventional Center which has a capacity of more than 15000 people in both two floors. It also has a very large Parking area which can hold more than 200 vehicles simultaneously. It can be easily noticed from the main road while traveling.

== Kuzhivelipady Juma Masjid ==
The main Juma Masjid in kuzhivelipady. The masjid runs under the Kuzhivelipady Muslim Jamaath. One of the oldest masjid in Ernakulam district as well as on kerala. It is more than 100 years old.
