= Allapra =

- town
- Location in Kerala, India Allapra (India)
- Coordinates: 10.095°N 76.471°E
- Country: India
- State: Kerala
- District: Ernakulam

Languages
- Time zone: UTC+5:30 (IST)

Allapra is a town in Kunnathunad Taluk of the Ernakulam district in the Indian state of Kerala. It is on Perumbavoor-Kolenchery road.
