= V. P. Sajeendran =

Indian politician

V.P. Sajeendran
- Constituency: Kunnathunadu

MLA for Kunnathunad
- In office May 2011 – May 2021
- Preceded by: Adv. M. M. Monayi
- Succeeded by: P. V. Srinijin

MLA for Kunnathunad
- Incumbent
- Assumed office May 2026
- Preceded by: P. V. Srinijin

Personal details
- Born: 31 May 1969 (age 57) Anicad, Kottayam
- Party: Indian National Congress
- Spouse: Leby Vijayan
- Children: Niranjan S (son) and Niharika S (Daughter)

Vellothyamala Padmanabhan Sajeendran is an Indian politician, businessman, and a former lawyer. He is a member of the Indian National Congress and currently serves as a member of the Kerala Legislative Assembly from Kunnathunad, Ernakulam, Kerala, India. He has served as a vice-president of the Kerala Pradesh Congress Committee since 2021. In the 2026 Kerala Legislative Assembly election, he defeated P. V. Srinijin by a margin of 21,283 votes. Former President of India K. R. Narayanan was a first cousin of Sajeendran's mother.

He married Leby, famous media person in Kerala (Reporter TV).

== Early life ==
Sajeendran was born on 31 May 1969 in Anicad, Kerala, in a Dalit family to K. Janakey and K.S. Padmanabhan. He is the youngest of six children. He belongs to the Bharathar/Paravan caste, which is officially classified as a Scheduled Caste to address historical socio-economic disadvantages.

He is known for his speeches in the Legislative Assembly.
