= Malankara Orthodox Syrian Church Medical College =

Hospital in Kerala, India

- Type: Private
- Established: 2002
- Parent institution: Kerala University of Health Sciences
- Location: Kolenchery, Kerala, India; 9°58′57″N 76°28′32″E
- Website: www.moscmm.org

Malankara Orthodox Syrian Church Medical College (MOSCMC) is a private medical school, located at Kolenchery, in the state of Kerala, India.

== History ==
Malankara Orthodox Syrian Church Medical Mission, a charitable institution registered under Travancore Cochin Literary, was established in 1970.

The Malankara Orthodox Syrian Church Medical College was established in 2002. The college of nursing was established in 2006. It is managed by the M.O.S.C. Medical Mission.

== Location ==
The complex is spread over an extensive area of 35-acre (140,000 m^{2}) and is located about 26 km east from the heart of Ernakulam District Headquarters.
