= Mar Athanasius Memorial Higher Secondary School, Puthencruz =

Mar Athanasius Memorial Higher Secondary School
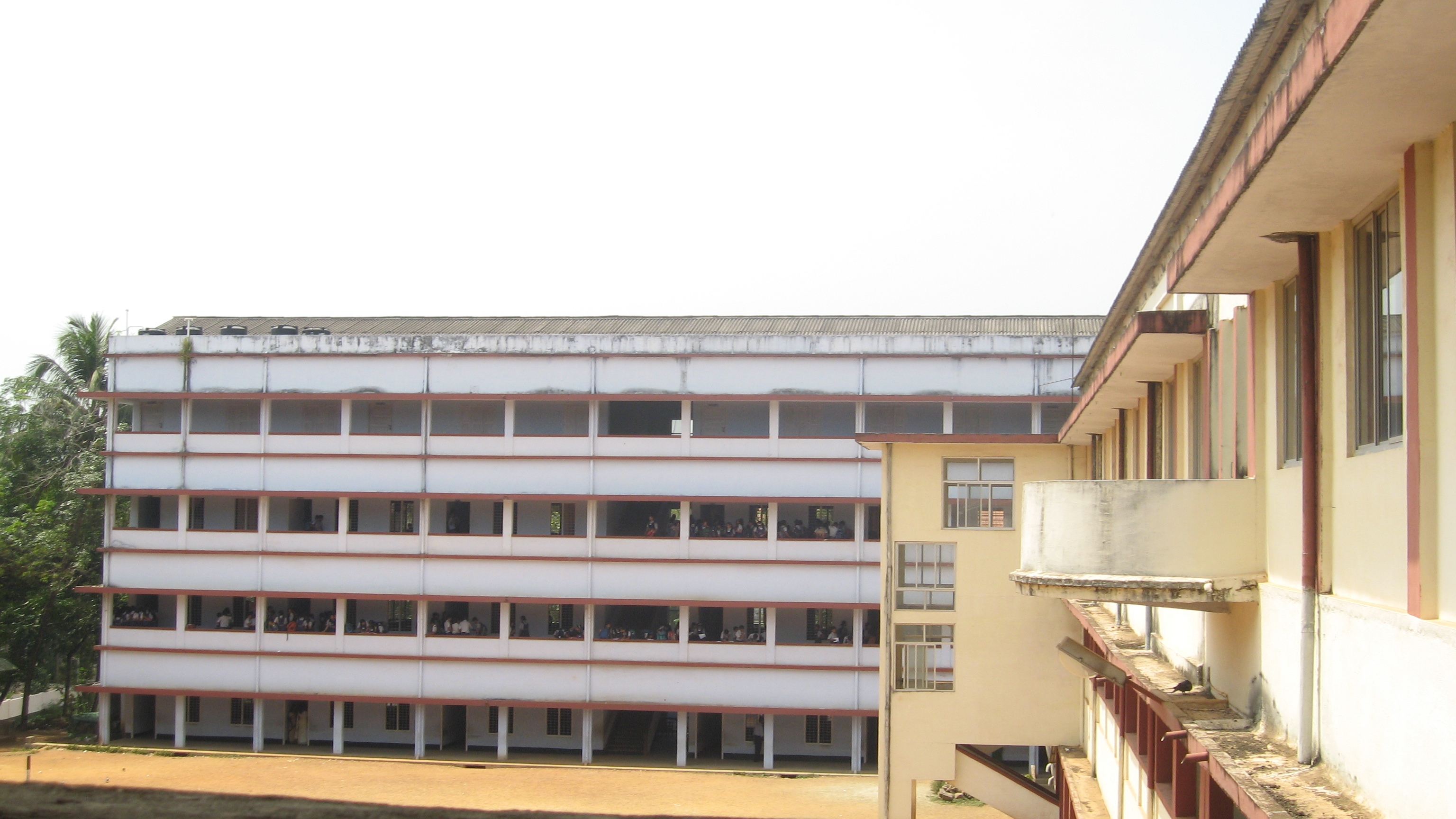

Location
- Puthencruz; Kochi, Kerala; India; 9.9673°N 76.4254°E

Information
- Motto: The Wise Shall Inherit Glory
- Founded: 1979
- Founder: Catholicos Baselios Thomas I
- School district: Ernakulam
- Grades: L.K.G to Std. 12
- Language: English

Mar Athanasius Memorial Higher Secondary School (MAMHSS) is a school situated in Puthencruz, Ernakulam district, Kerala. The school is affiliated with Kerala State Education Board, SCERT.

The school has been named after St. Athanasius Paulose popularly known as 'Valiya Thirumeni', who is a saint of the Syriac Orthodox Church.

Now the school functions as a part of the activities spearheaded by the Sisters of the St:Mary's Convent under the banner of St.Mary's Charitable Trust.

When the school started functioning, there were only 84 pupils on the rolls. Now there are about 1500 pupils from L.K.G to Std XII. There are 43 teaching staffs and 14 non-teaching staffs.

Recently management started Baselious Thomas Ist Catholicose Public School, a sister concern of the institution in the year 2004 following CBSE syllabus.

The late Very Rev. Thariyan Corepiscopa was the first Headmaster of the school. Late Annamma Philip, V.J. Mathew, late chev: Sri V.M. Eapen, M.P. Mathaikunju, M. Thankachan, and T.K. Peter headed the institution for different periods in succession.

There is an elected school council consisting of one representative from each class division.

The school now has a section for the IGCSE board

== History ==
The School is managed by the Malankara Jacobite Syrian Orthodox Church.
