= Rajagiri Hospital =

- Rajagiri (CMI) group of institutions

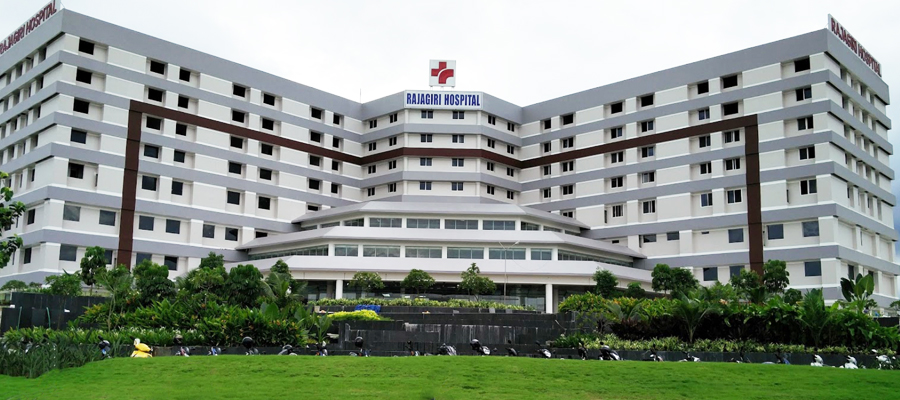

Geography
- Location: Aluva, Kochi, India

Organisation
- Care system: Tertiary
- Type: Multi-specialty

Services
- Beds: 570

History
- Founded: 2014

Links
- Website: www.rajagirihospital.com
- Lists: Hospitals in India

Rajagiri Hospital is a tertiary hospital in Edathala, near Aluva, in Kochi, Kerala. Established in 2014, it is owned and managed by the CMI group of institutions.
