= Elamkulam =

Elamkulam or Ilamkulam may refer to:

- Elamkulam, Malappuram, a village in Malappuram district
- Elamkulam, Kochi, a region in Kochi, Ernakulam district
- Elamkulam Kunjan Pillai, south Indian historian
