= Thamarachal Valiyapally =

- 10.0478°N 76.4096°E
- Location: Kizhakkambalam P.O, Aluva, Ernakulam District, Kerala
- Country: India
- Denomination: Jacobite Syrian Christian Church
- Tradition: Malayalam

History
- Founded: 1903; 123 years ago
- Dedication: St. Mary, St. Peter and St. Paul, St. George, Mar Yacoob Mar Samavoon

Administration
- Diocese: Angamaly Diocese

Clergy
- Vicar: Rev. Fr. Thomas M Paul Moolekattu

St. Mary's Jacobite Valiyapally, Thamarachal, is a Christian Pilgrim Center in Kerala, India.

The center is near Kochi and is part of the Angamaly Diocese of the Jacobite Syrian Church. It is a Valiyapally church dedicated to St Mary, and attracts thousands of people across the state of Kerala during Ettu Nombu Fest (the Eight Day Festival celebrating the birth of St Mary).

== History ==
It was established in 1903 by parishioners belonging to Morakkala St Mary's Cathedral, due to the distance they had to travel for their spiritual needs(more than 5 km). More than 300 families were part of this parish at that time. They set up a new church in the hillock of Thamarachal dedicated to St Mary. The following year St Peter's and St Paul's Church, Kizhakkambalam was established and a large number of parishioners joined the new parish.

In 1907 the holy relic of Mor Yacoob and Mor Samavoon, given by St. Sleeba Mor Osthathious, was installed. The Sunday School was established in 1915 and the following year some of the parishioners founded a parish at Oorakkad dedicated to St Thomas, to meet their spiritual needs. This parish established a school in the 1920s and later was closed to make way for the nearby Government school. In 1935 a chapel was established at Chemmalapady dedicated to St Ignatius of Manjinikkara.

In 1950 South Vazhakulam St George Church Was founded by Members of this parishThis parishes Golden Jubilee came in the year 1953 and to commentate that a chapel was established at Malayidomthuruthu, which later became part of Malayidomthuruthu St Mary's Church. In 1968 Marthamariyam Vanitha Samajam came into existence. In 1975 and 1980 two new parishes were established at Malayidomthuruthu and Vilangu respectively, both dedicated to St Mary. Mor Yacoob Mor Samavoon Youth Association came into existence in 1982. This year also witnessed the 1st Apostolic Visit of H H Ignatius Zakka I Iwas Patriarch of Antioch to this church. Ettunombu celebration began in 1986 and St Mary's holy "Soonoro" was installed in 1988. Pukkattupady St George church came into existence in 1990 from this church.

In the same year a new English Medium School was established, along with St Mary's Charitable Society, under this parish, which later became a CBSE school. St Mary's School and St Mary's College Thuruthiply continue to be run by the Valiyapally.

In 2002–03 this church celebrated its Century. In 2008 St Mary's Family Unit was established under this parish. This year also saw the Second Apostolic visit of H H Ignatius Zakka I Iwas, and the church was elevated as Valiyapally, due to its importance in the region and in the Jacobite church. In 2010 a unit of Mar Gregorios Jacobite Students' Movement (MGJSM), was established here and this church remained as the Pallikkara Region's Headquarters of MGJSM till 2013. The Marian convention centre is the largest parish hall in a Jacobite church.

This parish has 600 families, three chapels and five shrines.

== Organisations ==
=== Mor Yacoob Mor Samavoon Jsoya ===
This is the youth wing of the church. Its members are aged between 18 and 40. It currently has 400 active members and have received many Malankara Church awards for excellence including Best Unit and Best Charity Unit.

Council members

- Fr Thomas M Paul Moolekattu (President)
- Varghese Issac Peediackal (Vice President)
- Eldho Paul Karimpanakkal (Secretary)
- Shinil Mathew Thuruthummel (Joint Secretary)
- Paulson Paul Parattukudy (Treasurer)

=== Mgjsm Thamarachal ===
This is the student wing of the parish. Its members are aged between 12 and 22. This unit has become the Best Unit In Malankara for 2011, 2012 and 2013. This unit has 150 active members. It conducts monthly meetings providing classes for students.

== Daughter parishes ==
1. Oorakkad St Thomas Jacobite Syrian Church
2. Malayidomthuruthu St Mary's Jacobite Syrian Church
3. Chembarky St George Jacobite Syrian Church
4. Marygiri St Mary's Jacobite Syrian Church
5. Pukkattupady St George Jacobite Syrian Church
6. Vilangu St Mary's Jacobite Syrian Church
7. Kizhakkambalam St Peter's and St Paul's Jacobite Syrian Church
8. Choorakkod St George Jacobite Syrian Church
9. Karukulam St Mary's Church
