= Valayanchirangara =

- village
- Location in Kerala, India Valayanchirangara (India)
- Coordinates: 10.066°N 76.496°E
- Country: India
- State: Kerala
- District: Ernakulam

Languages
  - Official: Malayalam, English
- Time zone: UTC+5:30 (IST)
- PIN: 683556
- Vehicle registration: KL-

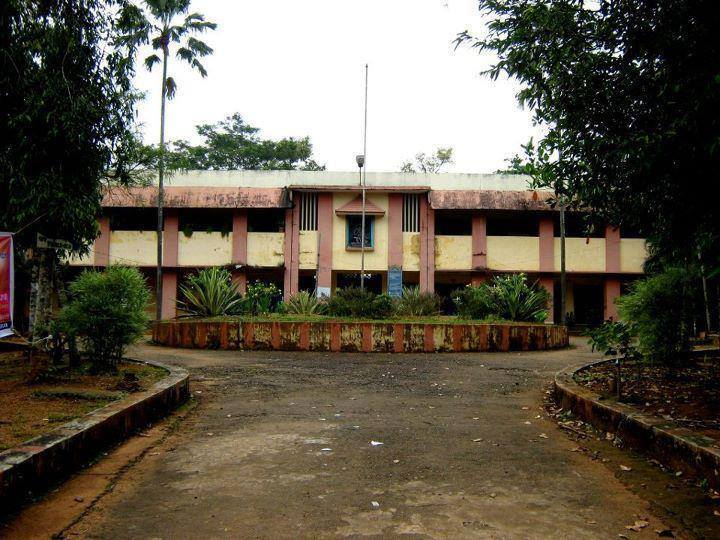
SSV College

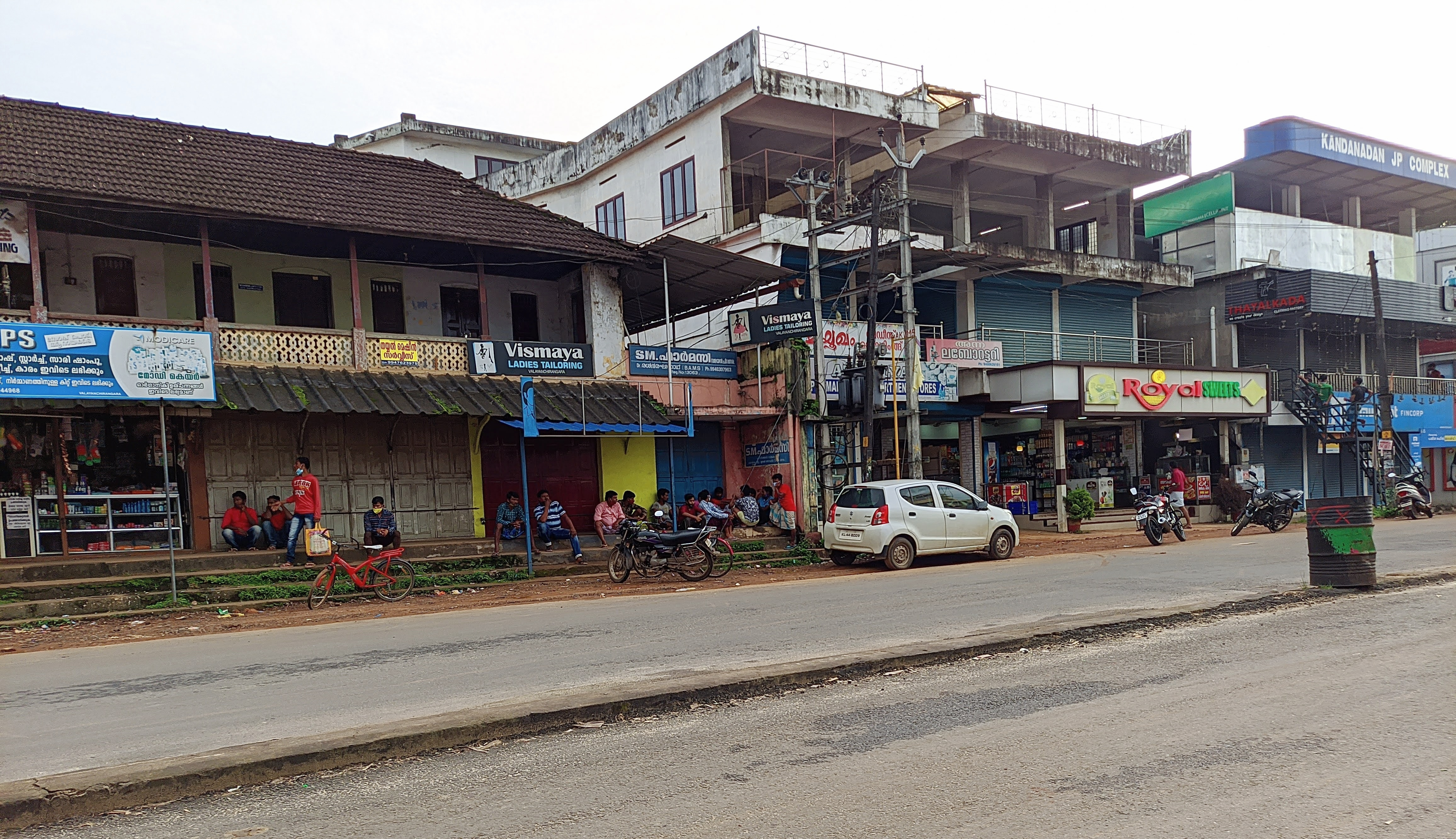
Street

Valayanchirangara is a village in the Ernakulam district of Kerala state, India. It is 7 km away from Perumbavoor.

== Etymology ==
The name Valayanchirangara or valanja chirayude kara means land on the shore of a curve shaped pond.

== Location and transport ==
Valayanchirangara is under Kunnathunad Taluk and a converging place of three Panchayats: Vengola, Mazhuvanoor and Rayamangalam. It comes under Chalakudy Lok Sabha constituency and the Kunnathunadu assembly constituency.

The main central road (a State Highway-MC Road) connecting to NH-47 at Angamaly is ½km away running parallel to Valayanchirangara. It is located at a distance of 23 km from the Ernakulam district collectorate at Kakkanad. The nearest railway station is Aluva (18 km) and airport is Cochin International Airport at Nedumbassery (21 km).

== Amenities and culture ==
Here exists an 'A' graded library (VNKPS Library), schools from KG levels to +2, a college under MG University, traditional temples, churches, mosques, a drama theatre called Suvarna Theaters, banks, a telephone exchange, post office & electricity board, hospitals, various shops and business ventures.

Barnabas, the American head of the Malankara Orthodox Church, died here. It is known as the famous pilgrimage center of the Orthodox Church.
