= Kadayiruppu =

- village
- Interactive map of Kadayiruppu
- Coordinates: 10°0′0″N 76°27′0″E
- Country: India
- State: Kerala
- District: Ernakulam

Languages
  - Official: Malayalam, English
- Time zone: UTC+5:30 (IST)
- PIN: 682311
- Vehicle registration: KL-17

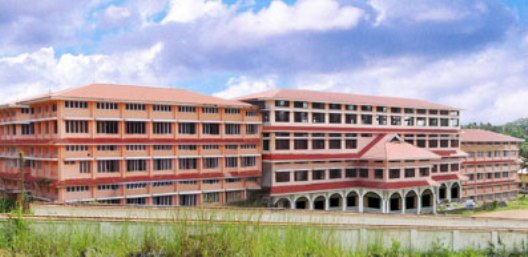
SNG College of Engineering

Kadayiruppu is a village on the outskirts of Kolenchery town in Kerala, India. Kadayiruppu located 4 km from Kolenchery on Perumbavoor Road. It possesses all the basic amenities of development and the village is well equipped with administrative support by the panchayat.
