= Marampilly =

- village
- Location in Kerala, India Marampilly (India)
- Coordinates: 10°6′30″N 76°25′0″E
- Country: India
- State: Kerala
- District: Ernakulam

Population (2011)
  - Total: 23,272

Languages
  - Official: Malayalam, English
- Time zone: UTC+5:30 (IST)
- Nearest city: Perumbavoor, Kochi
- Climate: moderate (Köppen)
- Website: www.marampallymeet.weebly.com

Marampilly (N.Vazhakulam) is a village in the Perumbavoor Ernakulam district in the Indian state of Kerala.

== Demographics ==
As of 2011 India census, Marambilly had a population of 23272 with 11662 males and 11610 females. It is 73.28% Musliam, 24.48% Hindu, and 2.13% Christian. Marambilly is located between Aluva and Perumbavoor, 8 kilometres away from both towns. There is a bridge to cross the Periyar River from Marambilly to Vellarappilly (Thiruvairanikulam).

Marambilly is a junction with roads to South Vazhakkulam and Vellarappilly, with a bank, automated teller machine, hospital, college, computer shop (events), schools, supermarket, temples, masjid, church and other small industries.

The nearest place is Manjapetty. There are four temples and a Masjid. Manjapetty Jangar service operates across Periyar river joining the old Travancore and Kochi states. The northern bank of Periyar was the birthplace (Puthiyedam) of Shakthan Thampuran, one of the reputed kings who ruled Kochi state from 1790 to 1805. There is an ancient temple in Puthiyedam. The pilgrim centre of the Christian community, St. Sebastian Church, Kanjoor is near the temple.
