= Thrikkalathoor =

- village
- Location in Kerala, India Thrikkalathoor (India)
- Coordinates: 10°2′0″N 76°32′0″E
- Country: India
- State: Kerala
- District: Ernakulam

Languages
  - Official: Malayalam, English
- Time zone: UTC+5:30 (IST)
- PIN: 683541
- Telephone code: 0484
- Vehicle registration: KL-17
- Nearest city: Muvattupuzha
- Lok Sabha constituency: Idukki

Thrikkalathoor is a village in Ernakulam district of Kerala state (India), located near to the towns of Perumbavoor, Muvattupuza, Kothamangalam and Kolencherry.

== Geography ==
The Thrikkalathoor village consists of the following places:

- Society pady
- Sangamam
- Kavumpady
- Pallithazham
- Pallichirangara
- Senaygiri
- Punnopady

== Politics ==
The village is located in the Muvattupuzha assembly constituency, which is part of Idduki (Lok Sabha constituency). It was part of Muvattupuzha (Lok Sabha constituency) until 2004. Thrikkalthoor is part of Payipra panchayat and Mulavoor village.Both Babu Paul and Eldo Abraham, the previous MLAs of Muvattupuzha, are natives of Thrikkalathoor.

== Educational institutions ==
- 1. Government LPGS, Society pady, Thrikkalathoor
- 2. Government LPBS, Pallithazham, Thrikkalathoor
- 3. NSS High School, Society Pady, Thrikkalathoor

== Religion ==
The population of Thrikkalthoor includes Hindus, Syriac Christians and Muslims.

== Places of interest ==
- Sree Rama Temple - A temple dedicated to Lord Sree Rama. It is located between Society pady and Mannoor.
- Pallimattathu Bhagavathy temple - A temple dedicated to the Goddess Bhadra, situated in the midst of paddy fields at Thrikkalathoor Kavumpady.
- Pallikkavu Thridevi temple - A temple dedicated to the Goddess Bhagavathy located in Pallichirangara Thrikkalathoor.
- St.George Jacobite Syrian Church( Under the Holy See of Antioch )- A church that belongs to the Jacobite Syrian community, located in Thrikkalathoor Pallithazham.
- Thottungalkkavu Bhagavathy Kshethram-A temple dedicated to goddess Bhadrakaali and Durgadevi located in Pallithaazham
- Mosque - situated in Pallichirangara.
- Therappara Caves
