= Irapuram =

Airapuram Airapuram
- village
- Location in Kerala, India Airapuram (India)
- Coordinates: 10.0373733°N 76.513541°E
- Country: India
- State: Kerala
- District: Ernakulam
- Taluk: Kunnathunad
- Elevation: 19 m (62 ft)

Population (2011)
  - Total: 19,137
- Time zone: UTC+5:30 (IST)
- 2011 census code: 627948

Airapuram is a village near Perumbavoor in the Ernakulam district of Kerala, India. It is located in the Kunnathunad taluk. It lies 10 km away from Perumbavoor and Muvattupuzha.

== Demographics ==
According to the 2011 census of India, Irapuram has 4770 households. The literacy rate of the village is 86.98%.

Demographics (2011 Census)
	Total	Male	Female
Population	19137	9573	9564
Children aged below 6 years	1709	883	826
Scheduled caste	2314	1165	1149
Scheduled tribe	74	34	40
Literates	16645	8467	8178
Workers (all)	8208	5607	2601
Main workers (total)	6841	4860	1981
Main workers: Cultivators	814	666	148
Main workers: Agricultural labourers	680	414	266
Main workers: Household industry workers	138	113	25
Main workers: Other	5209	3667	1542
Marginal workers (total)	1367	747	620
Marginal workers: Cultivators	201	154	47
Marginal workers: Agricultural labourers	340	194	146
Marginal workers: Household industry workers	63	30	33
Marginal workers: Others	763	369	394
Non-workers	10929	3966	6963
