= Vadavucode =

- Village
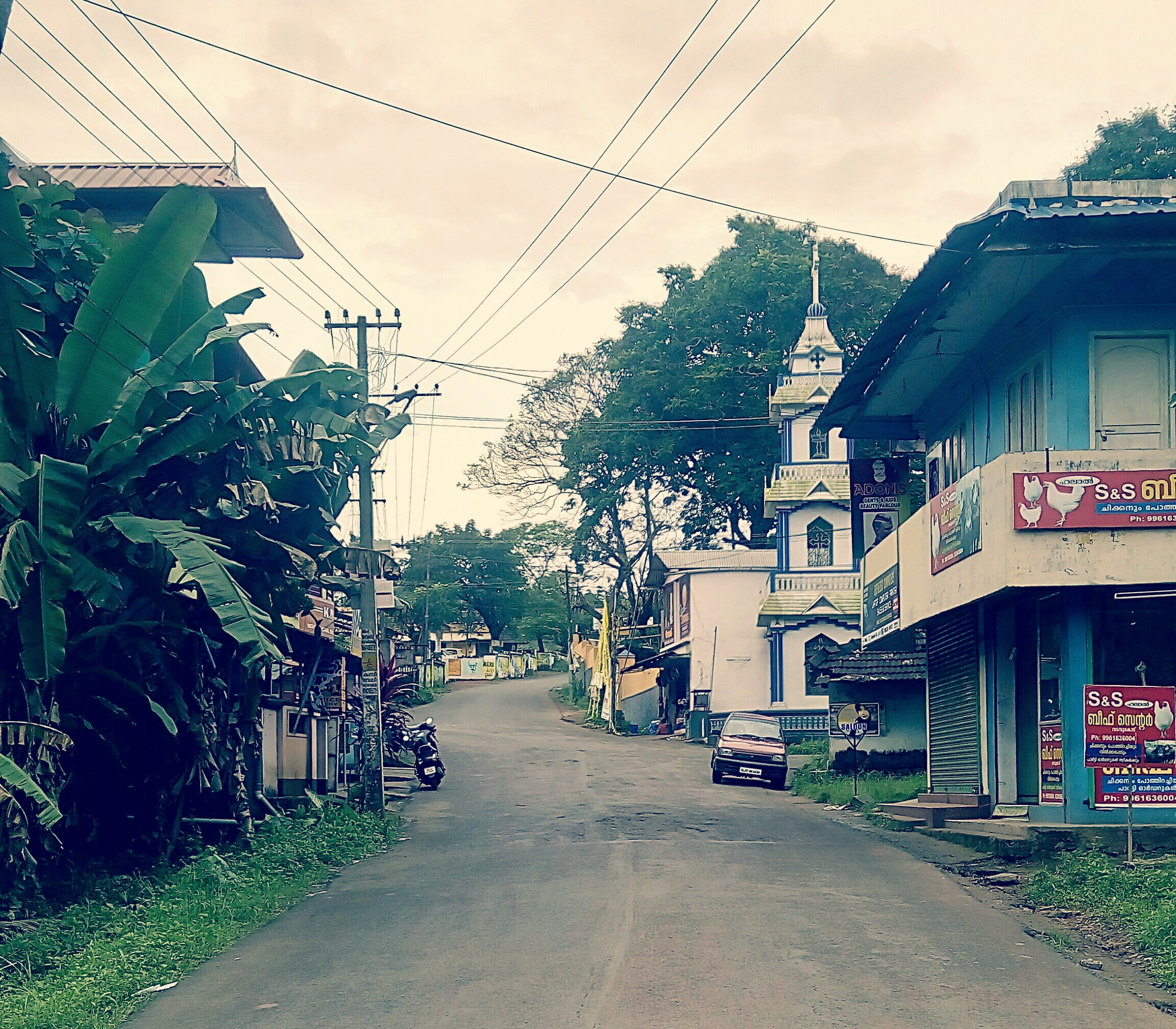
- Vadavucode_junction

- Location in Kerala, India
- Coordinates: 9.98571°N 76.428886°E
- Country: India
- State: Kerala
- District: Ernakulam
- Taluk: Kunnathunad
- Block Panchayath: Kolenchery
- District Panchayath: Vadavucode - Puthencruz

Languages
  - Official: Malayalam, English
- Time zone: UTC+5:30 (IST)
- PIN: 682310
- Telephone code: 0484
- Vehicle registration: KL-39
- Nearest city: Puthencruz,
- Loksabha constituency: Chalakkudy

Vadavucode is a village in the Ernakulam district in the state of Kerala, India near the town of Puthencruz. It is one of the local and Developing Village Near Puthencruz Town. Vadavucode plays a pivotal role in connecting the two villages of Kaninad and Pancode.

Vadavucode is famous for its "Kalavayal" or "Kala chantha"(cattle market) held on First Day of every Malayalam Month, Now known as "Vayalumpad"

== Institutions ==
=== Schools ===
1. Rajarshi Memorial Higher Secondary School
2. Govt.LP School Vadavucode
3. RMTTI Vadavucode..

== Government Offices ==
1. Village Office
2. Community Health Centre
3. Agriculture Office.
4. Post Office

== Worship Places ==
1. St.Mary's Syrian Orthodox Church
2. St.Mary's Suboro Jacobite Church
