= South Vazhakulam =

South Vazhakulam Thadiyittaparambu Thekke Vazhakulam
- village
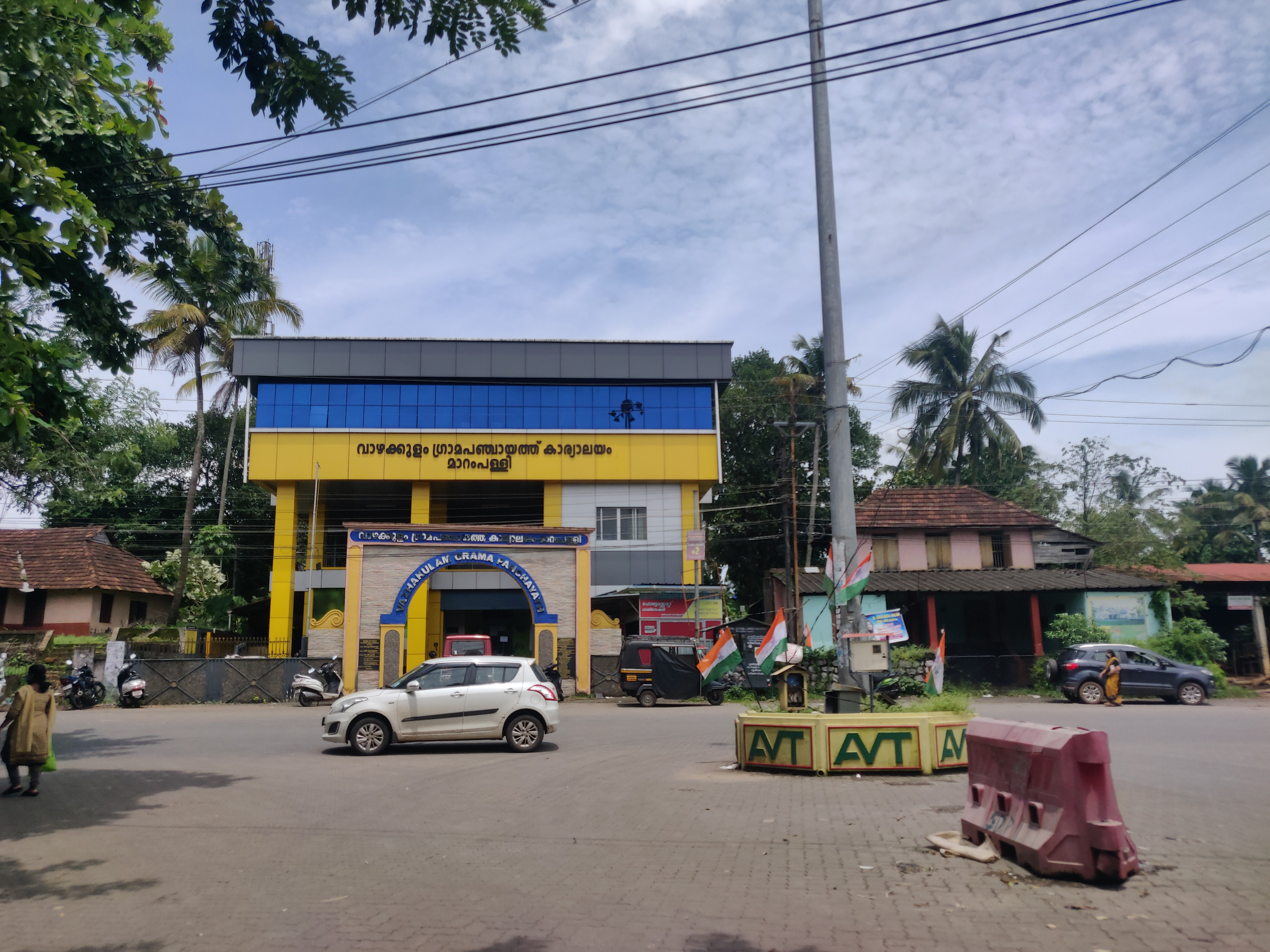
- Vazhakkulam Gramapanchayat Office, Marampilli

- Location in Kerala, India South Vazhakulam (India)
- Coordinates: 10.09°N 76.42°E
- Country: India
- State: Kerala
- District: Ernakulam

Government
  - Body: Vazhakulam Panchayat

Population
  - Total: 28,591 (Census data 2,001)

Languages
  - Official: Malayalam, English
- Time zone: UTC+5:30 (IST)
- PIN: 683105
- Telephone code: 0484
- Vehicle registration: KL-40
- Nearest city: Aluva, Perumbavoor
- Lok Sabha constituency: Chalakkudy

South Vazhakulam is a small town in between Aluva and Perumbavoor on Aluva-Munnar State Highway(SH-16). South Vazhakulam represents Vazhakulam Village, Vazhakulam Panchayat & Vazhakulam Block.

Vazhakulam, which was traditionally a farming village, has changed to an industrial area with many big and small industrial units and large warehouses operating in and around Vazhakulam. South Vazhakulam is the major shopping area for the residents between Aluva and Perumbavoor towns. South Vazhakulam is preferred by many people from across the state to settle down since it is located in the suburb of Kochi and is well connected to major towns, airport, railway station, and multi-specialty hospital. People following different religious beliefs live together in harmony. Also, the crime rate is very low. Periyar Valley Irrigation Main Canal flows through Vazhakulam and so the land is supplied with water even during summer.

== Etymology ==
Vazhakkulam comes from 'vazha' which means banana in Malayalam and 'kulam' which means pond in Malayalam. There were a lot of banana plantations in olden times and there were many ponds to irrigate these plantations.

== Administration ==
It represents Vazhakulam Block and Vazhakulam Panchayat in Kunnathunadu Taluk, Ernakulam District in the Indian state of Kerala.

== Villages and suburbs ==
Marampally, Vazhakkulam, Sreemulanagaram, Vengola, Keezhmadu, Edathala and Kizhakkambalam.

== Economy ==
South Vazhakulam is known for small scale industries and warehouses. It accommodates one of the largest warehouses in the state. There are many small size industries and trading concerns located in and around South Vazhakulam town.

=== Industries ===
- AVT Natural Products
- Mc Cormick
- V-Star
- Aizar Pipes
- Hycount
- Akay Flavours & Aromatics
- Godrej Agrovet
- New Glory Orthopedics
- Plywood units
- Cashewnut Factory

== Religious Centers ==
- Sasthamangalam Temple
- Vazhakulam Juma Masjid
- Infant Jesus Church Syro-Malabar Church
- St. Mary's Church Jacobite Church
- Chettiyath Bhagavathi Temple
- Ethyerikavu Bhagavathi Temple
- Ebenezer Marthoma Church

== Educational Institutions ==
- Vazhakulam Govt. Higher Secondary School
- Holy Crescent College of Architecture
- MES College Marampally
- TMJ Public School
