= Oorakkad =

- town
- Location in Kerala, India Oorakkad (India)
- Coordinates: 10.059°N 76.419°E
- Country: India
- State: Kerala
- District: Ernakulam

Languages
  - Official: Malayalam, English
- Time zone: UTC+5:30 (IST)
- Vehicle registration: KL-40

Oorakkad is a town in Kizhakkambalam panchayath near city of Kochi, India.

== Organizations ==
- Govt. U P School, Oorakkad

== Religious places ==
- St. Thomas Jacobite Syrian Orthodox Church, Oorakkad
- Sree Krishna Temple, Oorakkad
