= Puthencruz =

Puthencruz Vadavucode Puthencruz
- Town
- Location in Kerala, India
- Coordinates: 9°58′0″N 76°25′0″E
- Country: India
- State: Kerala
- District: Ernakulam

Population (2011)
  - Total: 22,378

Languages
  - Official: Malayalam, English
- Time zone: UTC+5:30 (IST)
- PIN: 682308
- Telephone code: 0484
- Nearest city: Ernakulam
- Lok Sabha constituency: Chalakkudy
- Vidhan Sabha constituency: Kunnathunadu
- Website: www.puthencruz.in

Puthenkurish is a town in Ernakulam district in the Indian state of Kerala near Kolenchery town en route to Muvattupuzha. It is a part of the Greater Cochin area.

== Etymology ==
The name Puthencruz is a Portuguesisation of the Malayalam word പുത്തൻകുരിശ് (puthan kuriśŭ), which means New Cross (the settlement was previously known as 'Pannikkuzhy kara'), and derives from the establishment of a new cross by the Syrian Christians who were the parishioners of Kolenchery St. Peter's & St. Paul's Orthodox Syrian Church in the year 1816. The cross was to assist against smallpox, and since a procession of the main festival from the mother church of Kolenchery extended up to Pannikuzhy kara, the people started to tell that "the procession shall extend to the Puthen Kurisu". "Puthankurisu", as it was called, was Portuguesised to Puthencruz.

== Demographics ==
As of 2011 India census, Puthencruz had a population of 22378 with 11014 males and 11364 females.

== Education ==
=== Colleges ===
- Mar Athanasius Memorial Higher Secondary School

== Religious institutions ==
- Patriarchal Centre, Puthencruz: Headquarters of the Jacobite Syrian Christian Church

== Residential Villa Projects ==
- Casa Bonitta Phase 1, Kurinji Puthenkurish Rd, Puthencruz
- Level 100 ECO ONE, Kurinji Puthenkurish Rd, Puthencruz
