= Kolenchery =

Kolenchery Kolenchery
- Suburb
- Location in Kerala, India Kolenchery (India)
- Coordinates: 9.982968°N 76.476388°E
- Country: India
- State: Kerala
- District: Ernakulam

Government
  - Body: Aikkaranadu/Poothrikka Panchayats

Languages
  - Official: Malayalam, English
- Time zone: UTC+5:30 (IST)
- PIN: 682311
- Telephone code: 0484
- Vehicle registration: KL-17
- Nearest city: Kochi
- Lok Sabha constituency: Chalakudy
- Civic agency: Aikkaranadu/Poothrikka Panchayats

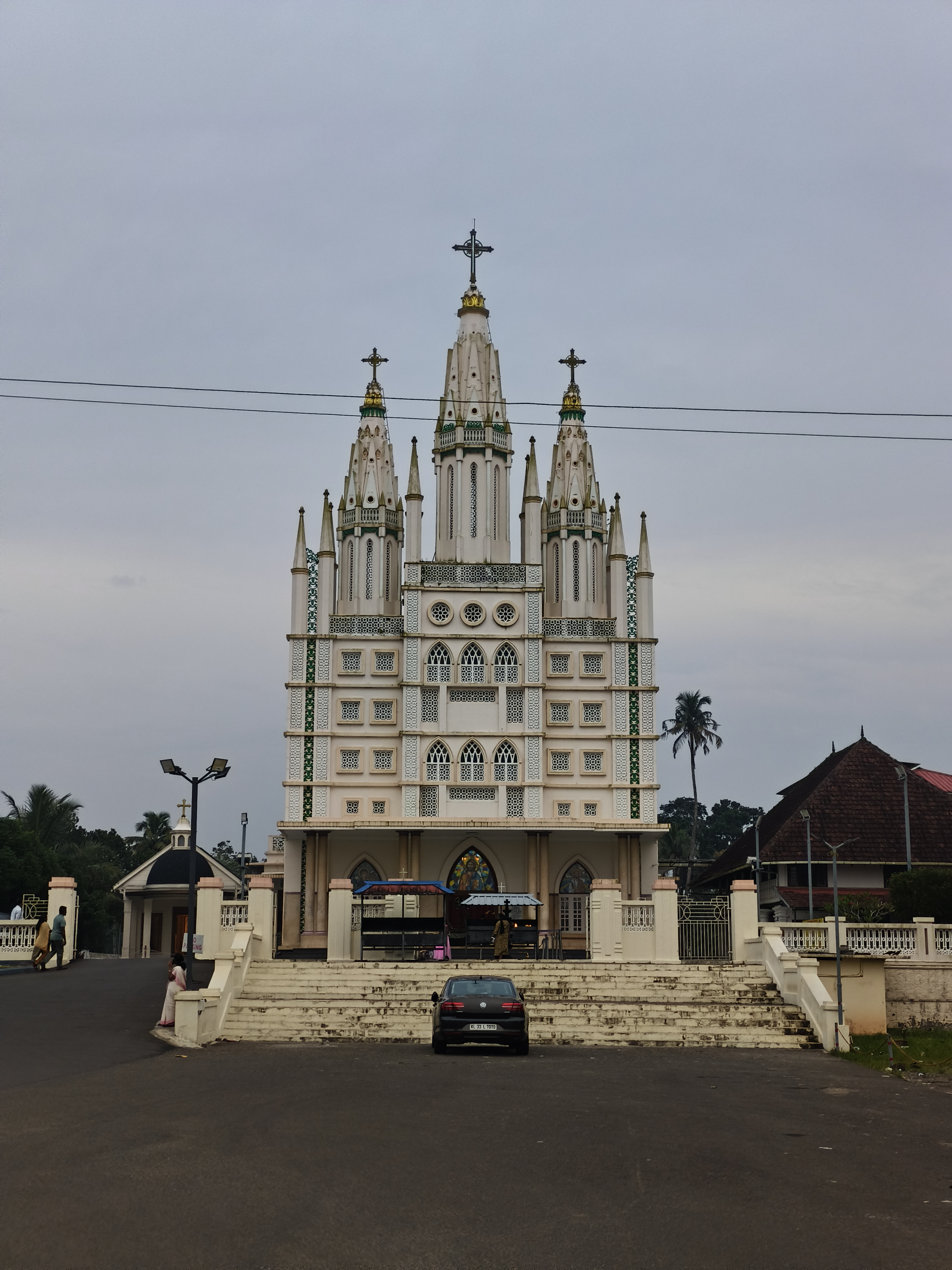
St. Peter and St. Paul's Church, Kolenchery

Kolenchery is a town in Poothrikka Grama Panchayat & Aikaranad Grama Panchayat in Ernakulam, Kerala. Located on National Highway 85, Kolenchery is situated 3 km (1.9 mi) from Poothrikka and 20 km (12 mi) from Kochi. There have been plans to include Kolenchery as part of the Kochi metropolitan area.

The name of the place originates from St. Peter's and St. Paul's Orthodox Syrian Church or 'Kolenchery Church', which is an ancient and historic church at Kolenchery built by Thankan Mappila of Kolenchery House in 9th century CE (7th century in Malayalam Calendar). The Tomb of Mar Thoma VII, the 7th Malankara Metropolitan, is situated in this historical Church.

St. Peter's College has conducted botanical research.

Kolenchery has developed into a local educational and healthcare centre, with institutions such as St. Peter's College, Kolenchery and MOSC Medical College Hospital. The town lies in the midlands region of Ernakulam district and functions as a connecting point between Kochi and inland, towards Muvattupuzha and Idukki.

== Etymology ==
According to local tradition, in 345 AD a family that came with Thomas of Cana from Syria settled at the trading centre of Kozhencherry. A branch of this family later moved to Kandanad and then to Elamkulam for commercial purposes. Because of their connection with Kozhencherry, they became known as the Kolenchery family. The church they established was called the Kolenchery Church, and the surrounding place eventually took the same name.

== History ==
According to local tradition, the origins of Kolenchery are linked to early Christian migrations to Kerala. In 345 CE, a group of families from Syria is said to have arrived with Thomas of Cana and settled at the trading centre of Kozhencherry. A branch of this family later moved to Kandanad and then to Elamkulam for commercial purposes. Because of their connection with Kozhencherry, they became known as the Kolenchery family.

The St. Peter's and St. Paul's Orthodox Syrian Church (also known as Kolenchery Church) was established by Thankan Mappila of the Kolenchery House during the 9th century. The church became the nucleus around which the settlement developed, and the place eventually took the name Kolenchery.

The church is also historically significant as the burial place of Mar Thoma VII, the 7th Malankara Metropolitan. He died at Kandanad Church in 1809, and his body was brought to Kolenchery Church for burial on 5 July 1809 (22 Mithunam), as the church had earlier served as one of his residences.

In more recent times, Kolenchery has grown from a small settlement centred on the church into a developing town on National Highway 85, located between Kochi and Muvattupuzha.

== Geography ==
Kolenchery is a town in Poothrikka Grama Panchayat of Ernakulam district, Kerala. It is located on National Highway 85 (formerly National Highway 49), approximately 20–27 km east of Kochi and about 3 km from Poothrikka. The town lies in the midlands region that extends from the eastern parts of Kochi towards Thodupuzha.

Kolenchery falls under the administrative jurisdiction of the Poothrikka and Aikaranad Gram Panchayats and is part of Kunnathunad taluk. The area has a tropical monsoon climate typical of central Kerala, with high humidity and substantial annual rainfall.

The town is situated roughly midway between Kochi and Muvattupuzha, making it a connecting point between the urban coastal areas and the inland regions of Ernakulam district.

== Transportation ==
Kolenchery is well connected by road. The town lies on National Highway 85 (formerly National Highway 49), which links Kochi with Munnar and continues into Tamil Nadu. This highway provides the main road access to the town.

Kolenchery is approximately 20–27 km east of Kochi and about 12–14 km from Muvattupuzha. Regular bus services operated by the Kerala State Road Transport Corporation (KSRTC) and private operators connect the town with Kochi, Muvattupuzha, Perumbavoor, and other nearby centres.

The nearest major railway stations are at Ernakulam and Aluva. Cochin International Airport is the closest airport, located about 30–35 km away.

== Religion ==
The most prominent religious institution in Kolenchery is the St. Peter's and St. Paul's Orthodox Syrian Church (also known as Kolenchery Church). It belongs to the Malankara Orthodox Syrian Church and is a historic church in the region. The church was established by Thankan Mappila of the Kolenchery House during the 9th century and is closely linked to the origin of the place name.

The church is the burial place of Mar Thoma VII, the 7th Malankara Metropolitan, who was interred there in 1809. It continues to serve as an important centre of worship for the local Syrian Christian community.

Kolenchery is also associated with the headquarters of the Kandanad West Orthodox Diocese of the Malankara Orthodox Syrian Church. In addition to the main church, the area has other Christian places of worship as well as Hindu temples serving the local population.

== Education ==
Kolenchery is an important educational centre in the eastern part of Ernakulam district. The most prominent higher education institution is St. Peter's College, Kolenchery, established in 1964. It is affiliated to Mahatma Gandhi University and offers undergraduate, postgraduate, and research programmes in arts, science, and commerce. The college has been re-accredited with an A++ grade by the National Assessment and Accreditation Council (NAAC).

The town is also home to the Malankara Orthodox Syrian Church Medical College (MOSC Medical College), established in 2002, which functions as a major medical education and healthcare institution in the region. Several schools also operate in and around Kolenchery, including institutions under the St. Peter's educational network.

== Economy ==
The economy of Kolenchery is primarily based on agriculture, small-scale industries, trade, and services. The surrounding areas cultivate crops such as rubber, coconut, nutmeg, and other plantation products typical of the midlands of Ernakulam district.

The town has developed as a local commercial centre, supported by its location on National Highway 85 and proximity to Kochi. Educational and healthcare institutions, including St. Peter's College and MOSC Medical College Hospital, also contribute to local employment and economic activity.

Kolenchery and the wider Aikaranad–Poothrikka region have traditionally been associated with construction contractors and related businesses. Small-scale industrial units and trading establishments operate in and around the town.
