= Kunnathunad =

- Panchayath
- Interactive map of Kunnathunad
- Coordinates: 10.0179°N 76.401°E
- Country: India
- State: Kerala
- District: Ernakulam
- Established: 1953

Population (2011)
  - Total: 22,881
  - Density: 1,520.67/km^{2} (3,938.5/sq mi)

Languages
  - Official: Malayalam, English
- Time zone: UTC+5:30 (IST)
- PIN: 683565
- Telephone code: 0484
- Vehicle registration: KL 40
- Website: https://lsgkerala.gov.in/en/lbelection/electdmemberdet/2020/680

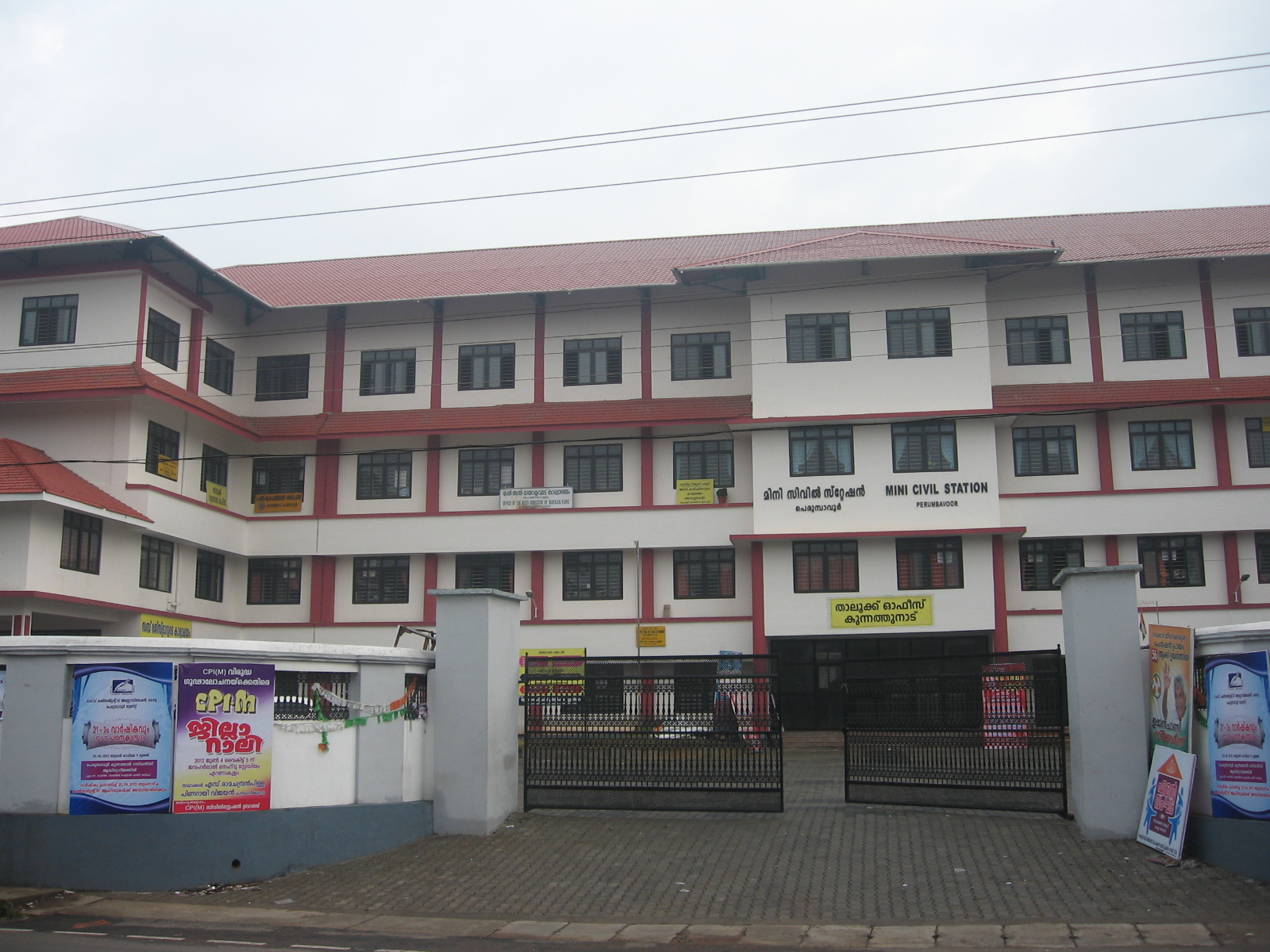
Taluk Office

Kunnathunadu (കുന്നത്തുനാട് ഗ്രാമപഞ്ചായത്ത്) is a Grama Panchayat located in Kunnathunadu Taluk of Ernakulam district in the Indian state of Kerala.

It falls under the administrative jurisdiction of the Vadavukode Block Panchayat and lies within the Kunnathunadu revenue villages. The Grama Panchayat covers an area of 18.57 square kilometres.

The headquarters of the Panchayat is located at Pallikkara Kumarapuram Junction. Major localities within the Panchayat include Pallikkara, Pattimattom, and Peringala.

== Infrastructure ==
The eastern gate of Infopark Phase II is located on the western side of Ward Pinarmunda within Kunnathunadu Grama Panchayat. A major international school, Sanskara School, established by the Muthoot Group, is located near the Infopark Phase II eastern gate.

== Healthcare ==
Kumarapuram, formerly known by that name and now referred to as Pallikkara Junction, is home to a Family Health Centre that serves the local population.

== History ==
Kunnathunad panchayath was formed during the period 1953-54.

== Demographics ==
As of 2011 India census, Kunnathunad had a population of 22881 with 11360 males and 11521 females. The amusement park Wonderla Kochi is located in Kunnathunad Pallikkara.

== Educational Institutions ==
1. Darussalam Public School, Pallikkara (CBSE)
2. Sanskara School by Muthoot (CBSE)
3. Govt. LP School Vembilly
4. St Marys HSS, Morakkala
5. ICT English Medium School, Peringala
6. Ashiyana Buds School, Pallikkara
7. St Marys Public School Thamarachal

== Landmarks ==
1. Wonderla
2. Infopark phase 2
