= Places of worship in Muvattupuzha =

The town of Muvattupuzha in Kerala, India contains places of worship for Hindus, Syrian Christians and Rawther Muslims.

== Temples and ashramas ==
=== Velloorkunnam Shiva Temple ===
‘Velloorkunnu’ means the hill of light. This is one of the rarest Siva Temples situated near The three rivers, which merge to form a single river. Worshippers believe that Lord Maheswara is the eliminator of all the worries. He gets easily pleased with those who worship. He awards peace in this World and salvation in the other World. He is the annihilator of the wicked and protector of the good. The idol in Velloorkunnam Mahadeva Temple is Kirathamoorthy, who gets easily pleased in his Devotees. They believe that the fore sating of arrogance and the trust in Lord Sankara bring them auspices. The other deities are Vinayaka, Sreekrishna, Sreedharma Sastha and Naga. Mondays, Saturdays and Pradosha days are important here. Among the Hindu temples the Velloorkunnam temple is the oldest and most traditional. Old people say that during the period of invasion of Tippu, terrified with the attack at any time the flag mast of this temple was removed and deposited in the river by the devotees. Still one can find the basement of this staff at the temple courtyard. Stories also live as to the hiding of the flag mast and valuables of Narasimha Temple at the pond in the temple compound. The ‘Sreekovil’ (sanctum sanctorum) of this temple which is round in shape is so beautiful incomparable with anyone of its kind. Narasimha Temple is also an old and traditional one owned by various ‘Manas’.

=== Puzhakkarakavu Bhagavati Temple ===
Puzhakkarakavu temple is dedicated to the Divine Mother. It is situated at the confluence of the three rivers and is the oldest temple in the town. The town grew around it. Sangharakshita gives some details about this place in his book.

Puzhakkarakavu on which the beauty, glory and fame of Muvattupuzha are founded requires particular mention. Even people from distant places come to worship here. The idol or ‘Vigraham’ in this temple is ‘Swayambhoo’, self made, naturally born. With the joint efforts of the king’s servants and local chiefs the temple was constructed at ‘Thriveni Sangamam’, point of harmony of the rivers, where the deity was discovered. The ‘Chirappu Maholsavam’ here is grand and colorful. It was started during the rule of the king, which is still celebrated with all devotion and glamour by the people of Muvattupuzha irrespective of the caste and the religion. Colorful cultural programs, rituals and prayers are the specialities of this age-old festival. There is an ‘Aanapandal’ (a canopy for the elephant) in this kavu which also bears a historical story. As the predecessor to the concrete Thodupuzha Bridge, there was a bridge made of wood, pillars been made of granite stones, constructed in 1917. Chattanathakaralayar of Chenkottai was the contractor for the work. The stone pillars failed to stick well to the ground and become firm despite all the engineering skills. A perplexed god fearing contractor made an offering to the goddess by donating the ‘anapandal’, when everything was made all right. This historical fact is inscribed in the stone laid in the temple.

=== Sree Kumara Bhajana Devaswom Temple ===
Sree Kumara Bhajana Devaswom Temple is located on a small hill at the heart of Muvattupuzha town. It is managed by the SNDP Union, Muvattupuzha. Lord Shiva and Lord Murugan have equal importance here. Annual temple festival called "Kumbha Pooya Mahotsavam" is very famous.

=== Pallikavu Bhagavati Temple ===
Pallikavu Bhagavati temple is situated on the banks of Muvattupuzha river. The temple is dedicated to 'Pallikavilamma.' It is situated off the Muvattupuzha-Arakuzha road. The divine presence of Pallikavilamma is believed to have been radiating from Chottinakkara. The temple is more than hundred years old.

=== Mattapili Sri. Krishna Temple ===
Sri. Krishna temple is dedicated to lord Krishna. It is situated on the banks of Muvattupuzha river, off the Muvattupuzha-Arakuzha road. Its name is Mattapilli Sree Krishna Swamy temple. This temple is hundreds of years old. It is believed that its by the brahmins who fled in fear of Tippu sulthan from Malabar placed their Lord in this place. There is Goddess Kali with Krishna in this temple.

=== Sivankunnu Temple ===
This temple of Shiva, situated at a great height, is almost as old as the one at the confluence. Sangharakshita mentions this place too in his book. It has almost 108 steps.

=== Thrikka Sri Krishnaswami Temple ===
Thrikka Sri Krishnaswami Temple is one of the oldest temples in the area located in a serene place near Velloorkunnam. The chief deity is 'Chathurbahu Vishnu' (four armed Vishnu). The present structure of the temple was completed during 2016.

=== Vellattu Porkali Bhadrakali Sastha Temple ===
This temple is located at Kadathy.

=== Ramakrishna Math ===
This Math is known locally for long as Sri Ramakrishna Ashrama. It is situated on a little hillock called Ashramam Kunnu and was founded in 1931 on behalf of Ramakrishna Mission by Swami Nirmalananda who was one of the Direct Disciples of Ramakrishna Paramahamsa. Though some renovation work was done between 2006 and 2008, this Math still exudes an old world charm. This Math has paid host to a number of noted monks of the Ramakrishna Mission starting with Swami Nirmalananda. They include Swami Niranjanananda (Junior), Swami Sailajananda (both disciples of Swami Nirmalananda) and others. Swami Bhajanananda, in his pre monastic days, was residing in a relative's house near Puzhakkarakavu Bhagavati temple and working in the Agriculture department. He wished to become a monk and came to this math. He was sent to Swami Agamananda of Kalady Ramakrishna Math who sent him to Swami Yatishwarananda of Bangalore Math. Swami Chitswarupananda (1948–78) and Swami Purushottamananda (1978–1997) managed the Ashrama as instructed by Ramakrishna Mission. Here stayed and worked for about fifteen months in 1947-48, the future Sangharakshita and Buddharakshita as Angarika Dharmapriya and Angarika Satyapriya. In his books `Thousand Petalled Lotus: The Indian Journey of an English Buddhist' and `The Rainbow Road' (both having many common chapters) - Sangharakshita devotes three very informative chapters to the sights he saw and experienced here. This began as a branch of Tiruvalla centre of Ramakrishna Mission and at present is a sub-center of Ramakrishna Math, Belur Math under the direct administrative control of its branch center at Kalady. After Swami Purushottamananda's demise in 1997, Swami Paramananda was Matadhipathi here for a few months, after which Swami Bhadrananda Puri took charge and continued for eight years till he officially handed over the charge to Swami Atmamaswarupananda, a monk of Ramakrishna Order deputed from the Ramakrishna Math Headquarters at Belur Math. Between 2006 and 2008 Swami Sampurnananda was in charge. Swami Akshayatmananda is presently in charge since 2010.

=== Kizhakkekara Sri Dharma Sastha Temple ===
This temple is located in Kizhakkekara road adjacent to Nirmala Medical Centre. Lord Ayyappa, Lord Shiva, Lord Ganapathy, Goddess Durga, Goddess Bhadra are also being worshipped here. There are separate Sree Kovils for Navagraha. This temple comes under Sri Dharma Sastha Temple trust.

=== Nettorkottu Vanadurga Devi Temple ===
This temple is located very close to the Muvattupuzha town on Muvattupuzha-Piravom Road, locally known as Nettorkottu Kavu. The main deity of this temple is the Goddess Vanadurga. Lord Ayyappa, Lord Shiva, Lord Vishnu and Naga (Sarppam) are also being worshipped here. There are separate Sree Kovils for Lord Shiva and Lord Vishnu . This temple comes under the Travancore Devaswom Board.

=== Peringazha Kavu Devi Temple ===
The Temple is located near Muvattupuzha Grandmas Curry Powders Company. It is situated in the banks of Muvattupuzha river. The temple is dedicated to "Peringazhakkavilamma"This Temple is more than hundreds of years old.The main deity of the temple is Bhadra Kali and with other gods like Ganpathi, Ayyappa, Krishna, Maha Vishnu.The main feastival in this temple is Meenabharani Ulsav.In that Ulsav days there is a special programme which named Garudan Thookkam.

== Churches ==
Muvattupuzha is a major center for Syrian Christians (commonly known as Nasrani) in Kerala. Syrian Christians of Muvattupuzha include Syro-Malabar Catholic, Syro-Malankara Catholic, Jacobite and Malankara Orthodox. Important churches in the region are:

=== Kadamattom Church ===
Kadamattom Church is the oldest church in this region and is situated 10 km west on route to Ernakulam. Kadamattathu Kathanar is a historical legend who became famous all over Kerala for his magical powers and he established his own tradition in Magic called Kadamattathu Sambradayam.

=== Marth Mariam Syro-Malabar Catholic Forane Church ===
Marth Mariam Syro-Malabar Catholic Forane Church is in Arakuzha village, 6 km from Muvattupuzha. It was established in 999 A.D.

=== Holy Magi Syro-Malabar Catholic Forane Church ===
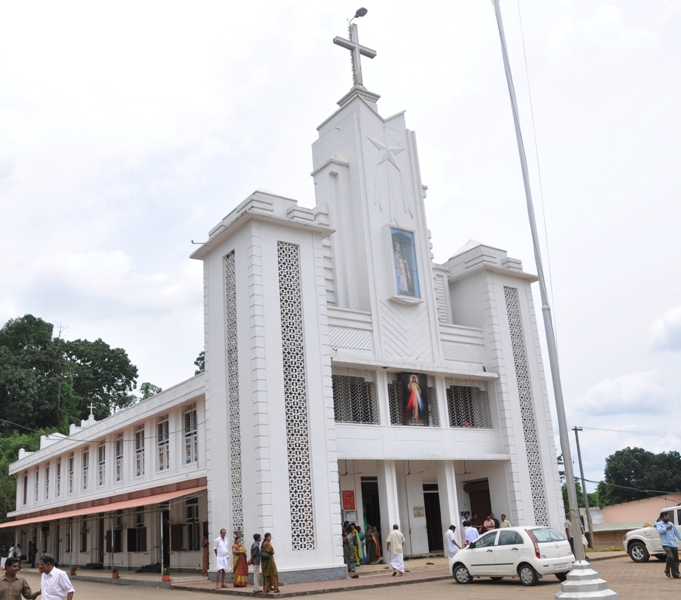
Holy Magi Forane Church Muvattupuzha

Holy Magi Syro-Malabar Catholic Forane Church, a Syrian Catholic Church situated in the centre of the city. The Church is under the Syro-Malabar Catholic Diocese of Kothamangalam

The Syrian Church located at the Post Office Junction is known as Holy Magi Church. In the first quarter of the 19th century, after circuit to the northern region, the King’s administrators were returning to south in ‘Manchal’ accompanied by the pedestrian forces. When they reached Muvattupuzha it was getting dark. They had to reach Koothattukulam, the nearby Inn for their stay. The team was upset due to lack of adequate lamps. Geevarghese achan of Arakuzha Pittapillil family helped them by arranging torches made of dried coconut leaves. As an expression of gratification for this, the ‘Adhikari’ recommended Achan to the king. Achan was invited to the palace and honoured with a ‘Vadi and Pidi’ (Stick with a Grip). Considering of goodwill of Achan, king allotted some land for the construction of a church. On 27 July 1820 the ancient form of the present church, a small chapel, came into existence. Apart from the native Christians who mainly hail from Arakuzha, Kothamangalam and Mylakompu Foranes, who constitute majority of the laity, Syrian Christians from Kizhakkambalam, Palai, Mannathoor, Veliyannoor, Nediyasala and other places migrated to this land and a powerful Syrian Catholic community made its roots here.

=== St. Joseph's Syro-Malankara Catholic Cathedral ===
St. Joseph's Syro-Malankara Catholic Cathedral is the headquarters of the Syro-Malankara Catholic Diocese of Muvattupuzha.

=== Christ the King Church ===
Christ the King Latin Church is situated near Vazhappilly junction founded in 1925. A Latin Catholic community, though small in number consisting of people originally from Varapuzha, Kottappuram and Kochi lives here.

== Mosques ==
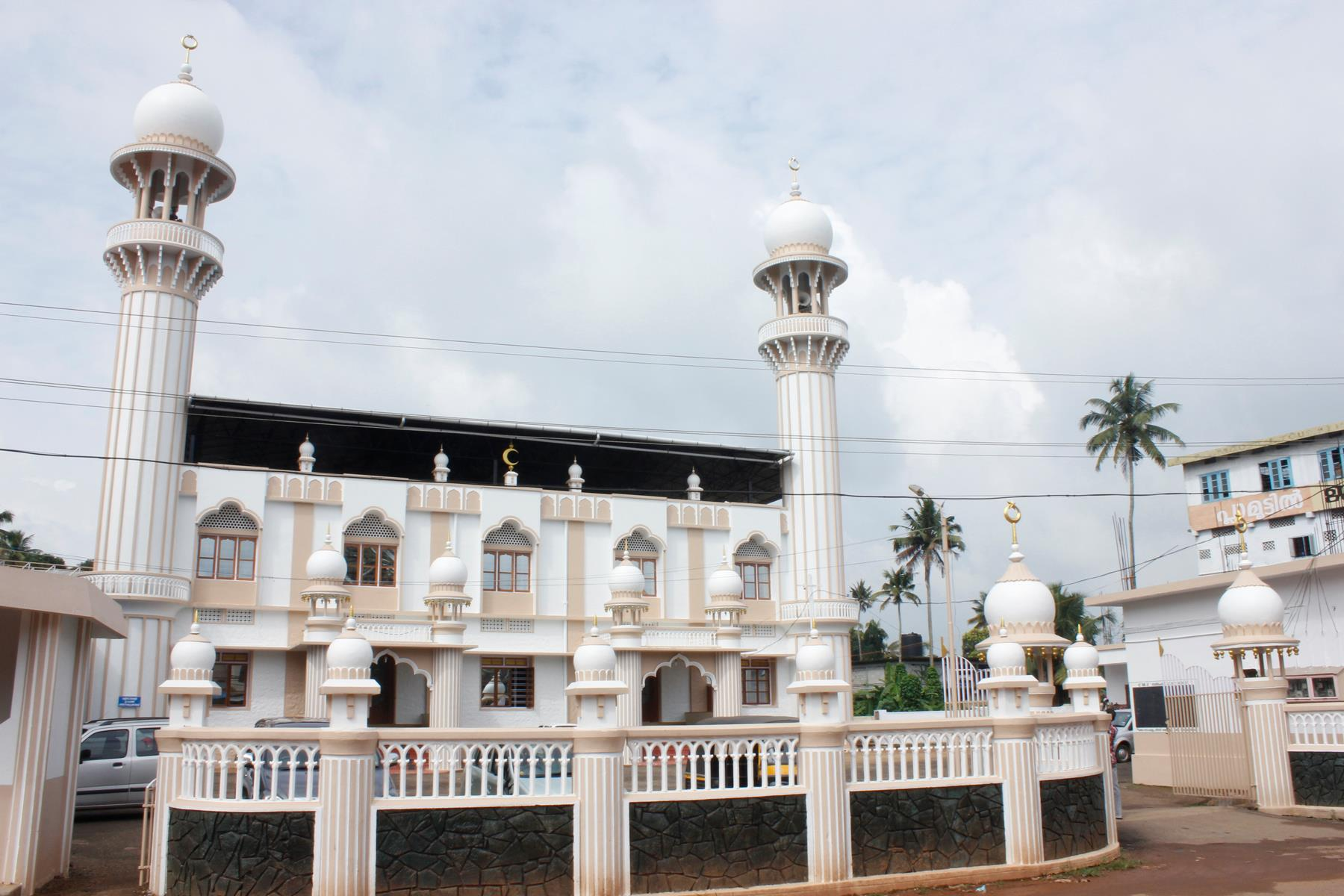
Central Mahallu Jama ath

Muvattupuzha-Kothamangalam region is a main centre for Rawther Muslims. unlike southern districts of Kerala, Shafi Rawthers Muslims makes up most of the Muslim population. Thulukkar (Hanafi Rawthers), the Hanafi school of Islam followers are majority in southern parts of Kerala. In Muvattupuzha, Thulukkar are concentrated around Pettah, near Post office Junction. Muslims include Sunni, Ahmediyya.

- Rawther Muslims following Shafi'i Fiqh are the majority in Muvattupuzha, Kothamangalam Talukas. the main Masjid is Central Mahallu Jama'ath situated at Kavumkara market.
- Perumattom Dasukhi Masjid is one of the oldest one. Valiyuppappa, a Sufi Darvesh famous for his treatments and mystical capabilities lived in Perumattom. Rawther Muslims of this region considers Perumattom as the main centre from where many of them migrated to Nellikkuzhy, Kothamangalam and parts of Idukki.
- Petta Juma Masjid in Pettah, near Post office Junction, Muvattupuzha is the main mosque of Thulukkar (Hanafi Rawthers) They are Rawthers who follow Hanafi Fiqh.
- Ahmediyya Mosque is situated in Vazhappilly towards Pattimattom route.
