= Velloorkunnam =

- Village
- Location in Kerala, India Velloorkunnam (India)
- Coordinates: 10°0′18.2″N 76°32′50.8″E
- Country: India
- State: Kerala
- District: Ernakulam

Government
  - Type: Panchayati raj (India)
  - Body: Gram panchayat

Population (2011)
  - Total: 11,576

Languages
  - Official: Malayalam, English
- Time zone: UTC+5:30 (IST)
- PIN: 686669
- Telephone code: 0485
- Vehicle registration: KL-17, KL-7
- Nearest city: Muvattupuzha, Kochi
- Climate: Tropical monsoon (Köppen)

Velloorkunnam is a village in Muvattupuzha in Ernakulam district in the Indian state of Kerala.

== Demographics ==
As of 2011 India census, Velloorkunnam had a population of 11,576.
