= Holy Magi Syro-Malabar Forane Church, Muvattupuzha =

Church in Kerala, India

Holy Magi Syro-Malabar Catholic Forane Church
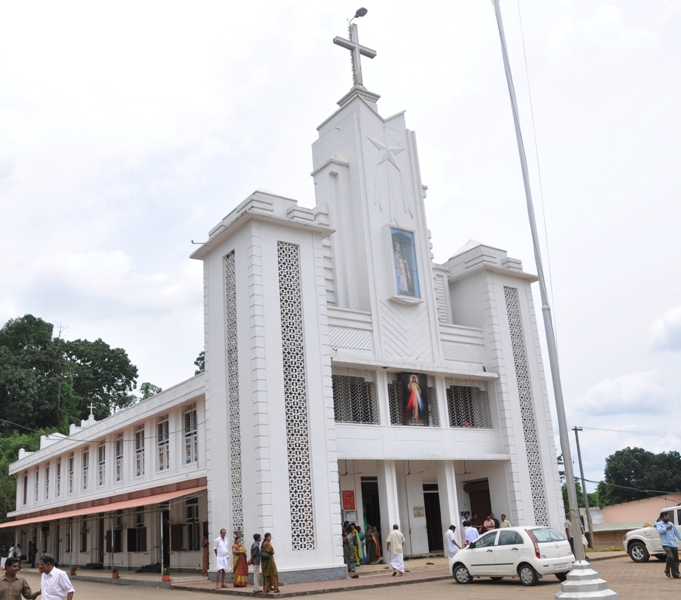

Religion
- Affiliation: Syro-Malabar Catholic Church
- Province: Syro-Malabar Catholic Diocese of Kothamangalam
- Leadership: Major Archbishop

Location
- Location: Muvattupuzha
- Interactive map of Holy Magi Syro-Malabar Catholic Forane Church

Architecture
- Style: Gothic Revival

The Holy Magi Syro-Malabar Catholic Forane Church is situated in the center of Muvattupuzha, Kerala, India. The church is under eparchy of Kothamangalam. The current vicar of church is Fr.Paul Nedumpurath.

== History ==
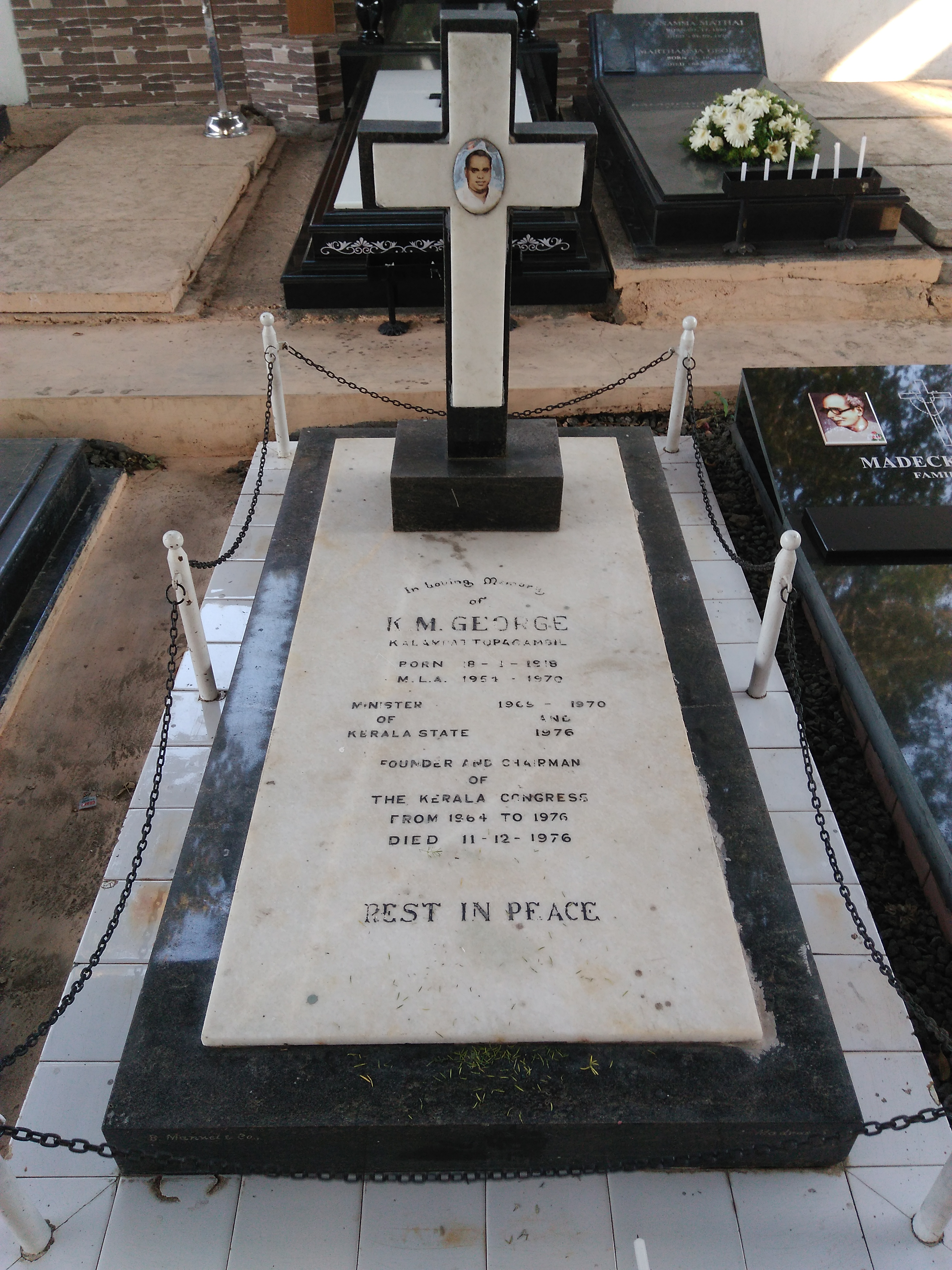
Tomb of K. M. George, founder of Kerala Congress, at Holy Magi Syro-Malabar Church, Muvattupuzha.

In the first quarter of 19th century after circuit to the northern region the king's administrators were returning to south in ‘Manchal’ accompanied by the pedestrian forces. When they reached Muvattupuzha it was getting dark. They had to reach Koothattukulam, the nearby inn for their stay. The team was upset for want of adequate lamps. Geevarghese Kathanar of Arakuzha Pittapillil family helped them by arranging torches made of dry coconut leaves. As an expression of gratitude for this, the ‘Adhikari’ recommended Achan to the king. Achan was invited to the palace and honoured with a ‘vadi and pidi’ (stick with a grip). Considering of goodwill of Kathanar, the king allotted some land for the construction of a church. On 27 July 1820, the ancient form of the present church, a small chapel, came into existence. With timely repairs, renewals and renovations the church attained its present growth. Apart from the native Christians who mainly hail from Arakuzha and Mylakompu Foranes, who are the majority of the church laity. Syrian Christian Achayans from Palai, Mannathoor, Veliyannoor, Nediyasala and other places migrated to this land and a powerful Syrian Catholic community made its roots there.

== Religious organisations ==
- CML
- Yuvadeepthy
- St. Vincent De Paul Society
- Carmelita 3rd Order
- Mathrudeepthy
- AKCC
- Thirubalasakiyam

== Educational institutions ==
- Nirmala Higher Secondary School
- Nirmala Public School
- Little Flower L.P. School
- Nirmala College

== Parishes under forane ==
- St. Sebastian Syro-Malabar Catholic Church, Anicadu
- BVM Rosary Syro-Malabar Catholic Church, Karakunnam
- St. George Syro-Malabar Catholic Church, Marady
- St. Jude Syro-Malabar Catholic Church, Mekkadampu
- St. Joseph Syro-Malabar Catholic Church, Mudavoor
- Nirmala Matha Syro-Malabar Catholic Church, East Muvattupuzha
- St. Michael Syro-Malabar Catholic Church, Randar
- St. Max. Kolbe Syro-Malabar Catholic Church, East Vazhappilly

== Daily Qurbana times ==
Sunday	5.30 AM - Holy Qurbana, 7 AM - Holy Qurbana,8.30 AM - Holy Qurbana,10 AM - Holy Qurbana, 4.30 PM - Holy Qurbana
Monday	6 AM - Holy Qurbana, 6.45 AM - Holy Qurbana
Tuesday	6 AM - Holy Qurbana, 6.45 AM - Holy Qurbana
Wednesday	6 AM - Holy Qurbana, 6.45 AM - Holy Qurbana
Thursday	6 AM - Holy Qurbana & Novena of Pooja Kings, 6.45 AM - Holy Qurbana
Friday	6 AM - Holy Qurbana & Adoration,6.45 AM - Holy Qurbana
Saturday	6 AM - Holy Qurbana, 7 AM - Holy Qurbana, 4.30 PM - Holy Qurbana and Novena of Mother of Perpetual Help

== See also ==
- Muvattupuzha
- Syro Malabar Church
- Arakuzha
- Kothamangalam
- Syro-Malabar Catholic Diocese of Kothamangalam
- Nirmala College, Muvattupuzha
- Catholic Church
