= Perumpalloor =

- Village
- Location in Kerala, India Perumpalloor (India)
- Coordinates: 9.9670°N 76.5830°E
- Country: India
- State: Kerala
- District: Ernakulam

Languages
  - Official: Malayalam, English
- Time zone: UTC+5:30 (IST)

Perumpalloor is a village 4 km southeast of Muvattupuzha in Ernakulam, Kerala, India. It is a small area in the Arakuzha panchayat of Muvattupuzha taluk on the banks of the Thodupuzha river.
