= State Highway 41 (Kerala) =

Highway in Kerala, India

State Highway 41
- Ernakulam – Thekkady Road
- SH 41 highlighted in red

Route information
- Maintained by Kerala Public Works Department
- Length: 155.1 km (96.4 mi)
- Component highways: NH 185 from Anavilasam to Kumily

Major junctions
- West end: NH 66 in Palarivattom
- NH 85 / SH 1 / SH 8 in Muvattupuzha; SH 44 / SH 33 in Thodupuzha; SH 59 in Parappu; NH 185 in Kumily
- East end: Thekkady

Location
- Country: India
- State: Kerala
- Districts: Ernakulam, Idukki

Highway system
- Roads in India; Expressways; National; State; Asian; State Highways in Kerala
← SH 40	→ SH 42

State Highway 41 (SH 41) is a state highway in Kerala, India that starts in Palarivattom and ends in Thekkady. The highway is 155.1 km long.

== Route map ==
Palarivattom – Kakkanad – pallikkara – Kizhakkambalam – Pattimattom - Valamboor – Muvattupuzha – Arakuzha - Pandappilly – Arikkuzha - Chittoor - Manakkad - Thodupuzha - Moolamattom - vagamon - Chottupara – Upputhara – Kumily - Thekkady

== See also ==
- Roads in Kerala
- List of state highways in Kerala
