= Anchal Post =

Historical postal service in the kingdoms of Travancore and Cochin

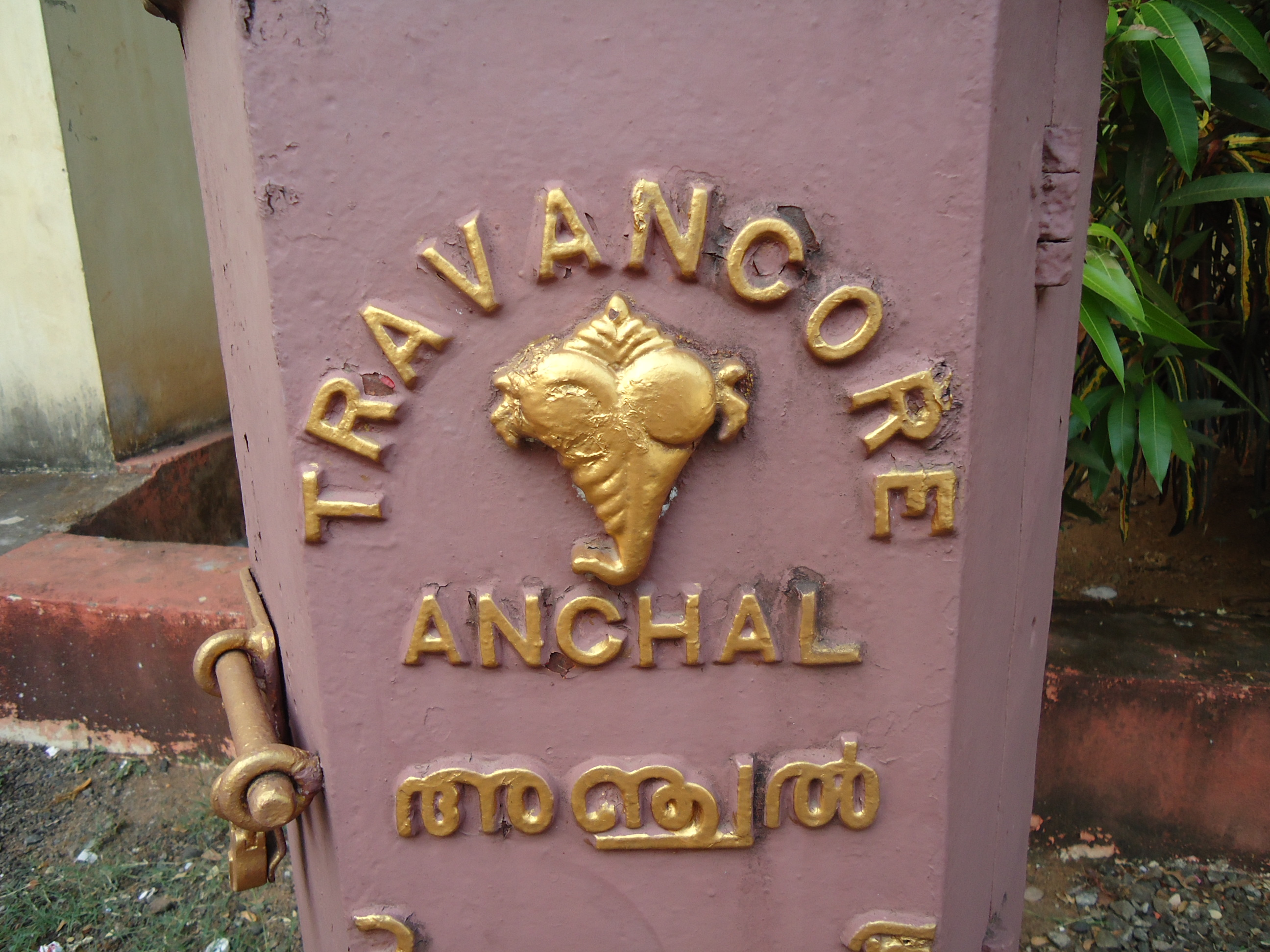
Anchal box with Royal Shankha emblem

Anchal post was a historical postal service in the kingdoms of Travancore and Cochin. It was then merged with India Post on 1 April 1951 after the Independence of India. It was started in Travancore in 1729 when it was ruled by Marthanda Varma and later in Cochin in the 1770s.

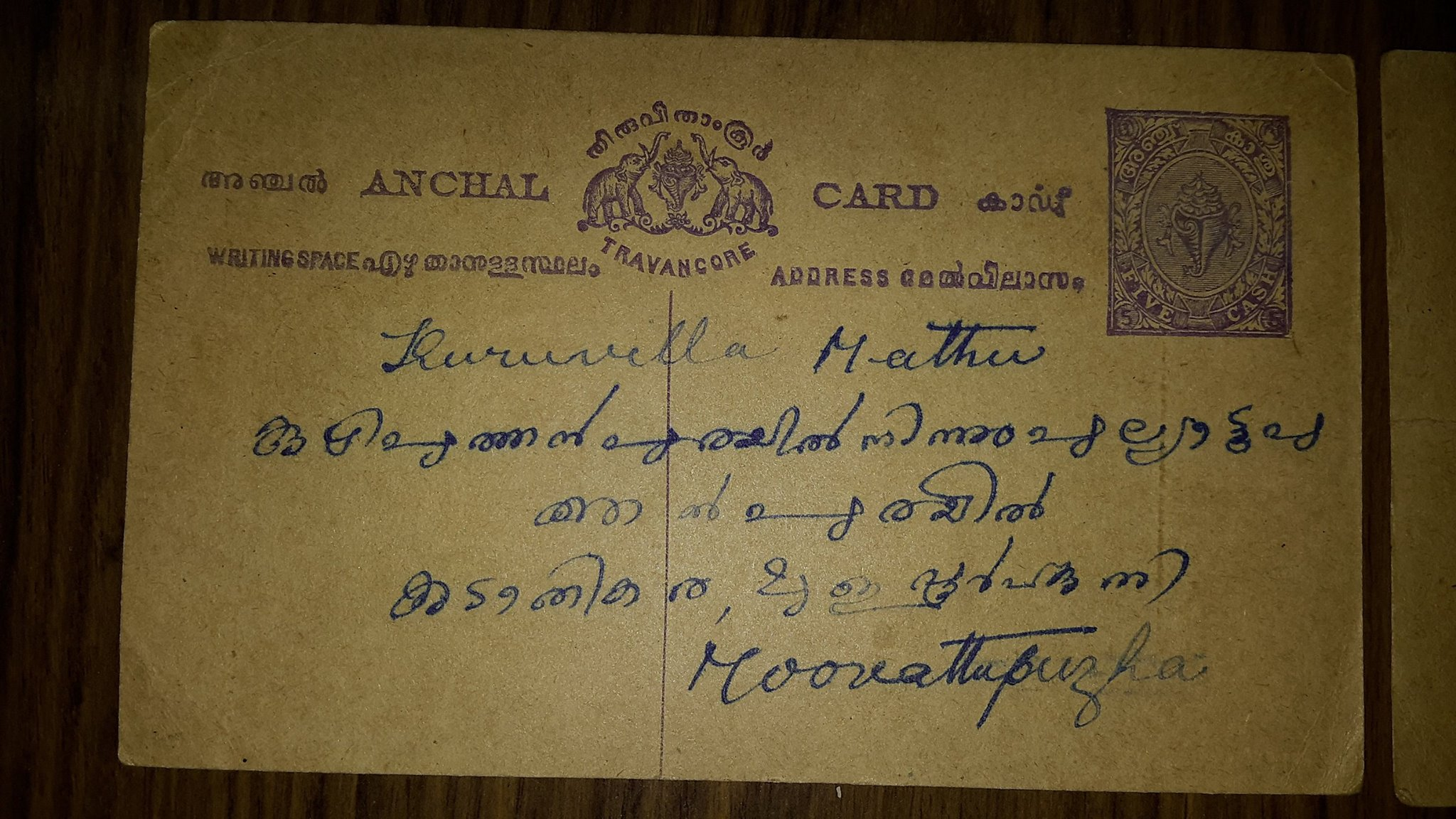
Anchal postal stationery post card

== Etymology ==
The name Anchal derives from the Greek word Angelos meaning messenger. (Greek. Angelos) an angel, a messenger who runs on foot, the bearer of despatches. It is believed that name Anchal was given to the early post by General John Munro, the then Resident Diwan of Travancore.

== Anchal symbol ==
The symbol of Anchal post is Shankha.

== Anchal post boxes ==
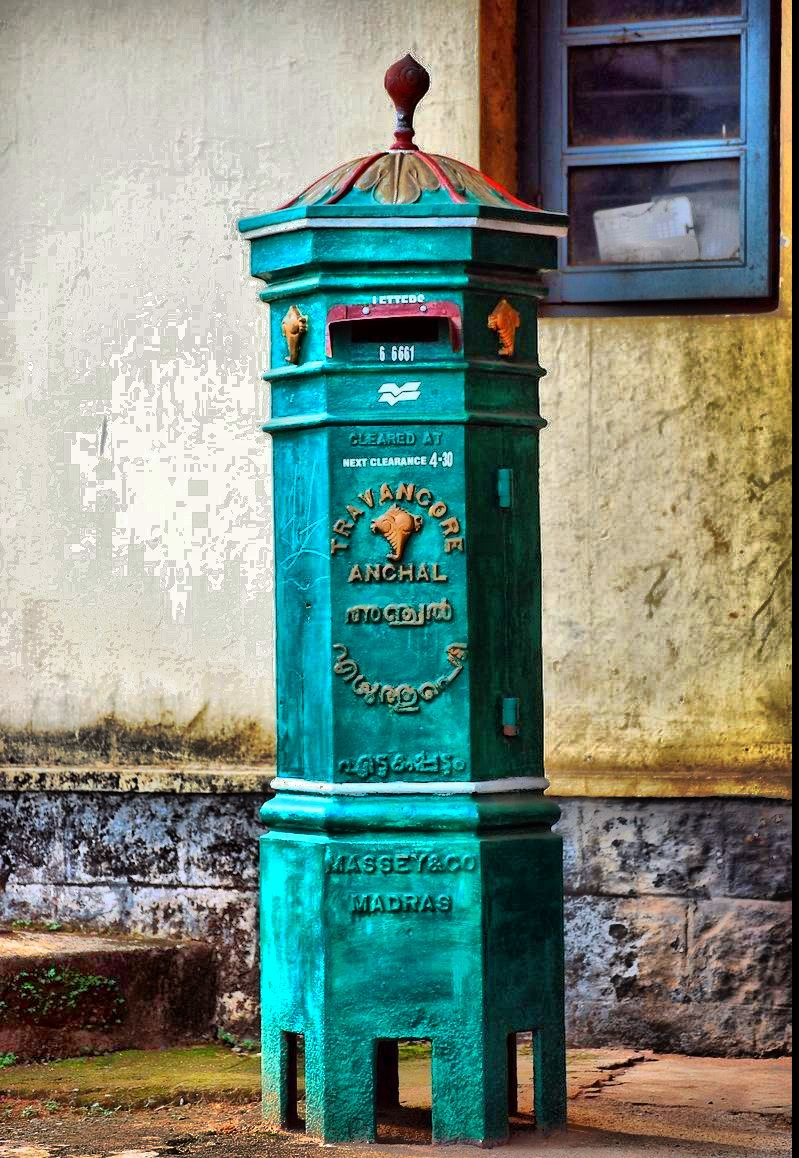
Anchal box at Muvattupuzha head post office

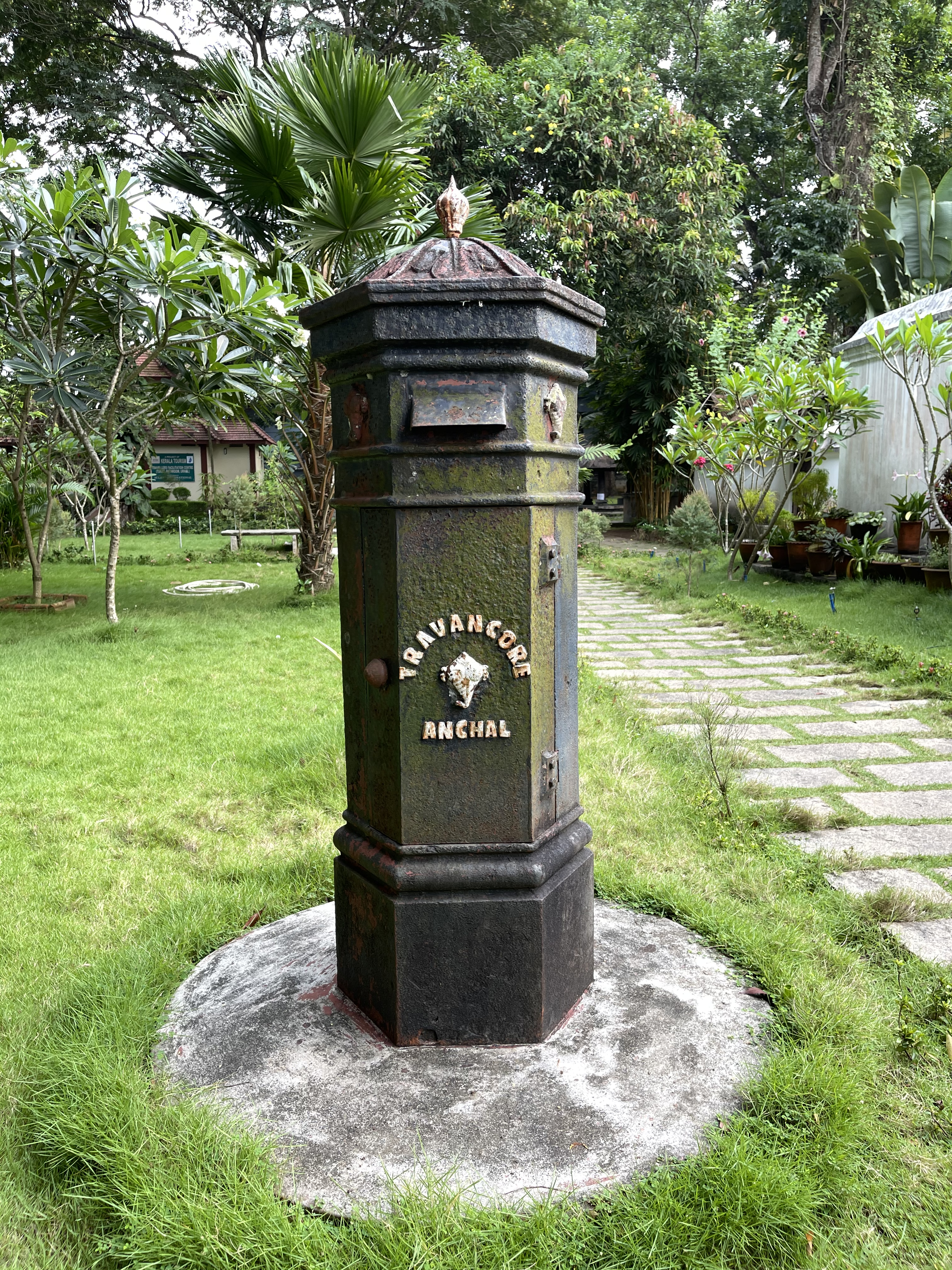
Anchal Post Box in Krishnapuram Palace.

These pillar boxes are made of cast iron, are about 100 cm tall and hexagonal in shape. The letter box features the State emblem, the Shankha. A pair of smaller Shankha are seen on either side of the mail slot. The words Travancore Anchal, Anchal letter box, letters taken are embossed and at the centre of the box is a Shankha emblem. Also it shows what time the letter is cleared out from the box. These letter boxes, each weighing about 715 kilograms, could take about 3000 letters and small packets. The manufacturer's name, Massey & Co, Madras is embossed on them.

== Anchal runner ==
The early post man of Travancore & Cochin was called an Anchal pillai. The Anchal pillai runs with the postal bag carried on his head and with a two-foot staff on his hand on which bells are attached. His uniform was Khaki shorts, Khaki shirt and a Khaki hat with red lining on it. When the Anchal pillai comes running everybody, upon hearing the bell ring, made way for him. Legally the mail man had a priority.

== Important events ==
The first Anchal post office was opened in 1852 in Alappuzha at the time of Uthram thirunal Marthandavarma. A telegraph was introduced in Travancore in 1863. A postal savings scheme started in 1912 at the time of the Diwan Raghava Iyer. The money order service was started in 1901 and an insurance scheme commenced in 1921

== Gallery ==
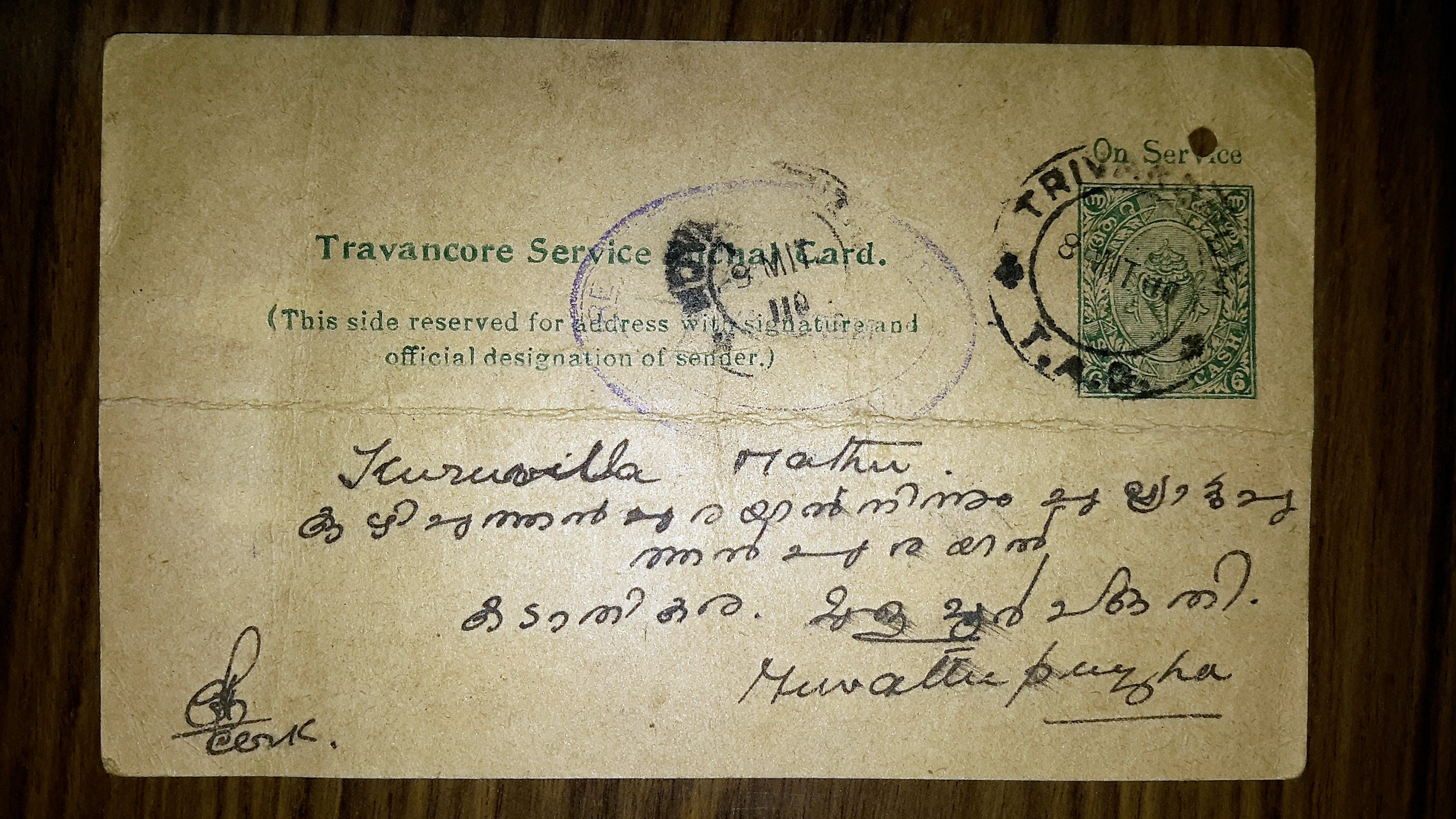
Anchal post card

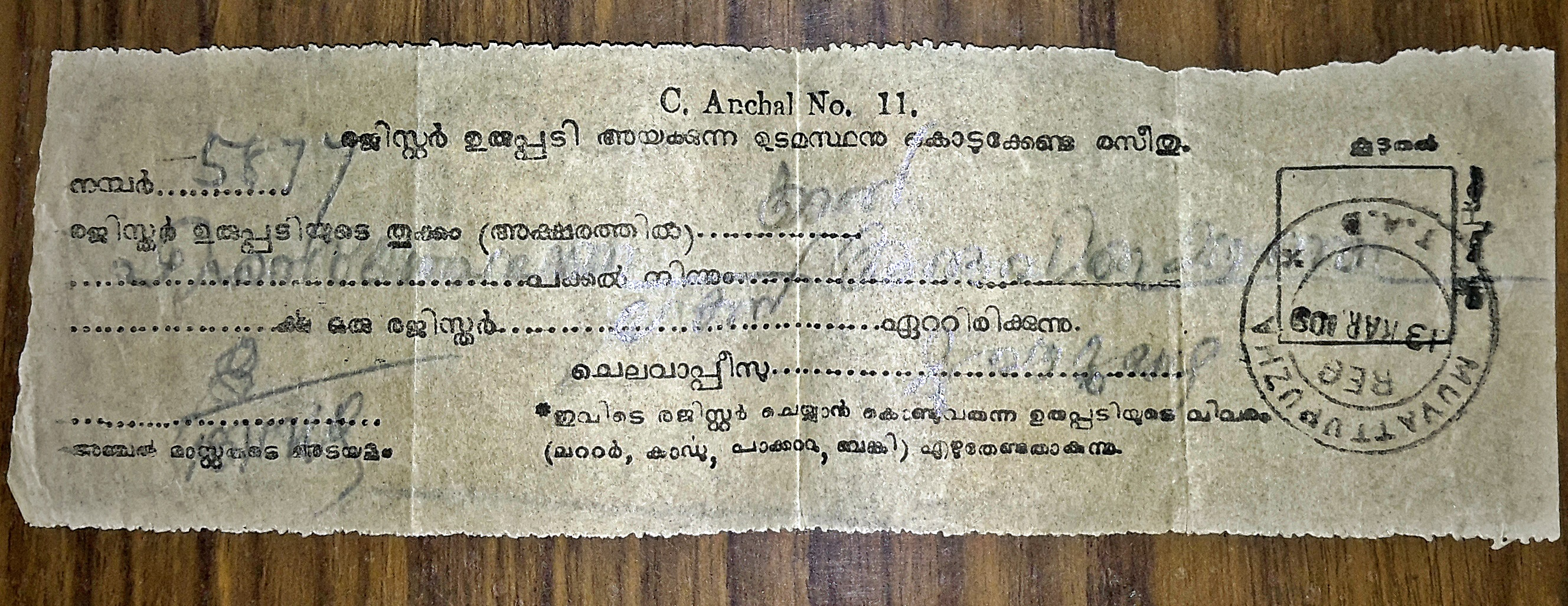
Receipt of Registered Anchal

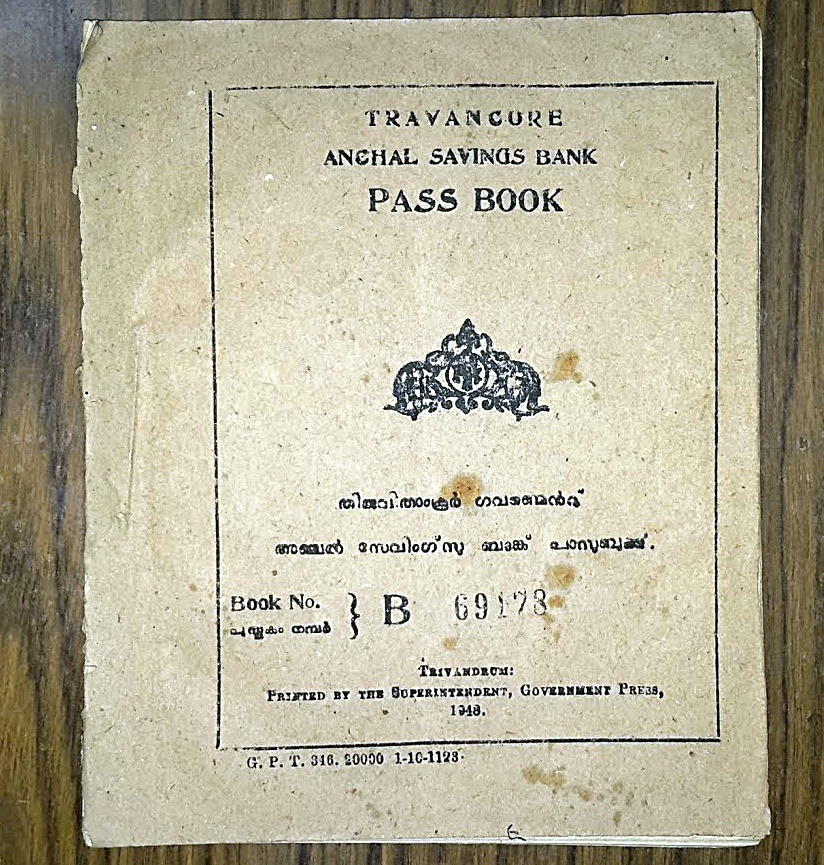
Anchal savings bank passbook

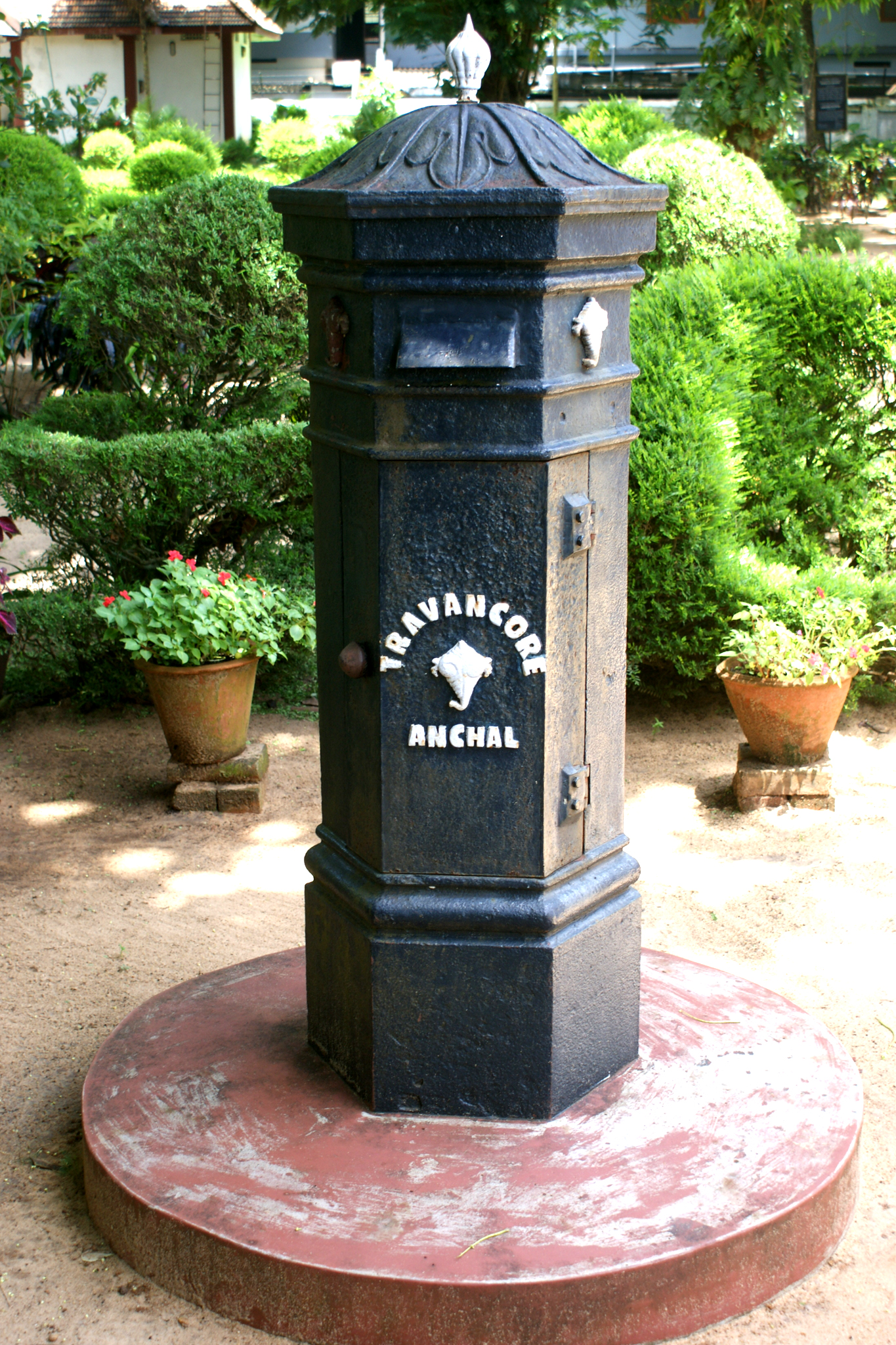
Travancore Anchal box at Krishnapuram palace, Kayamkulam

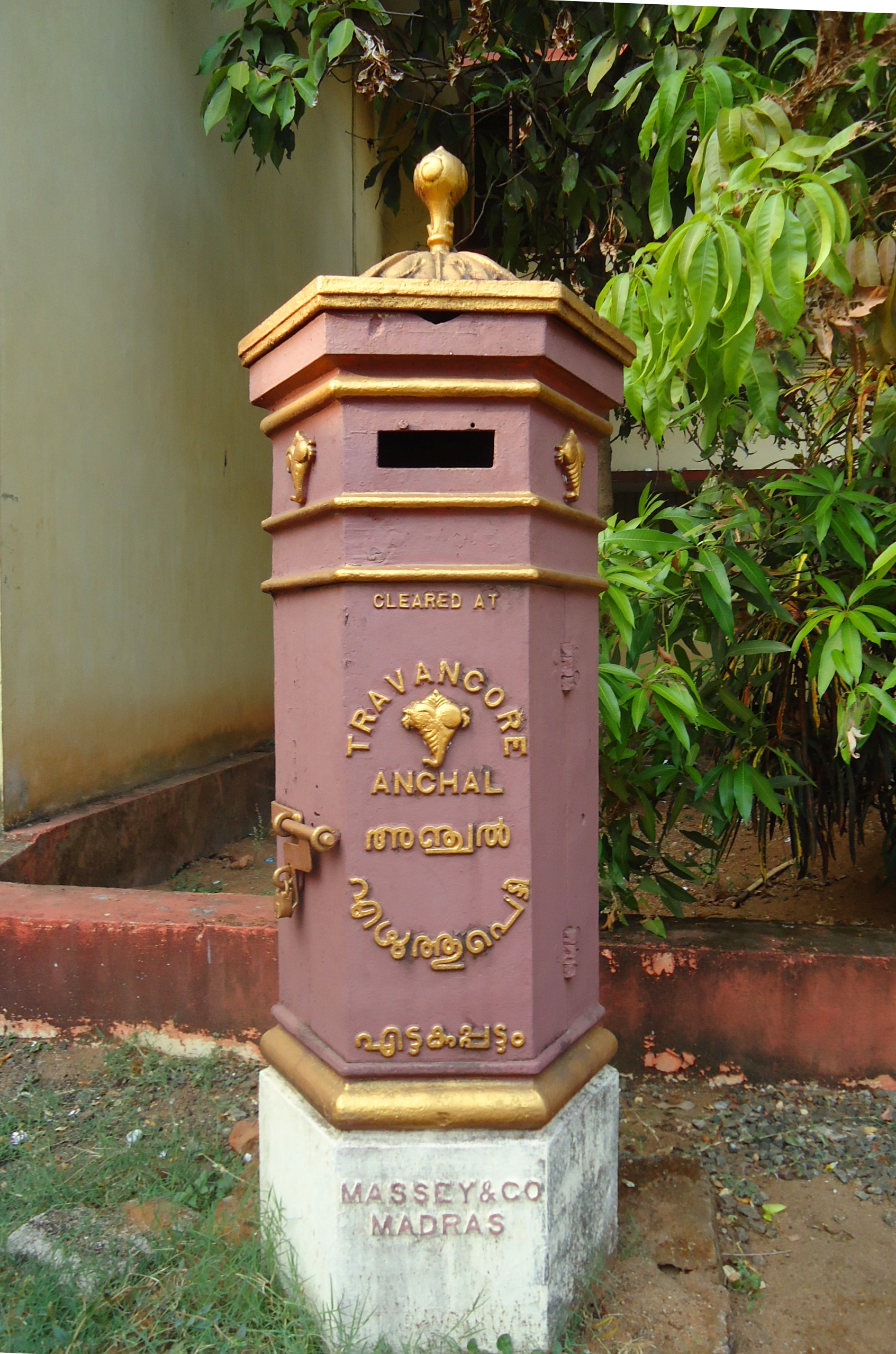
Anchal box at Perumbavoor Government Rest House

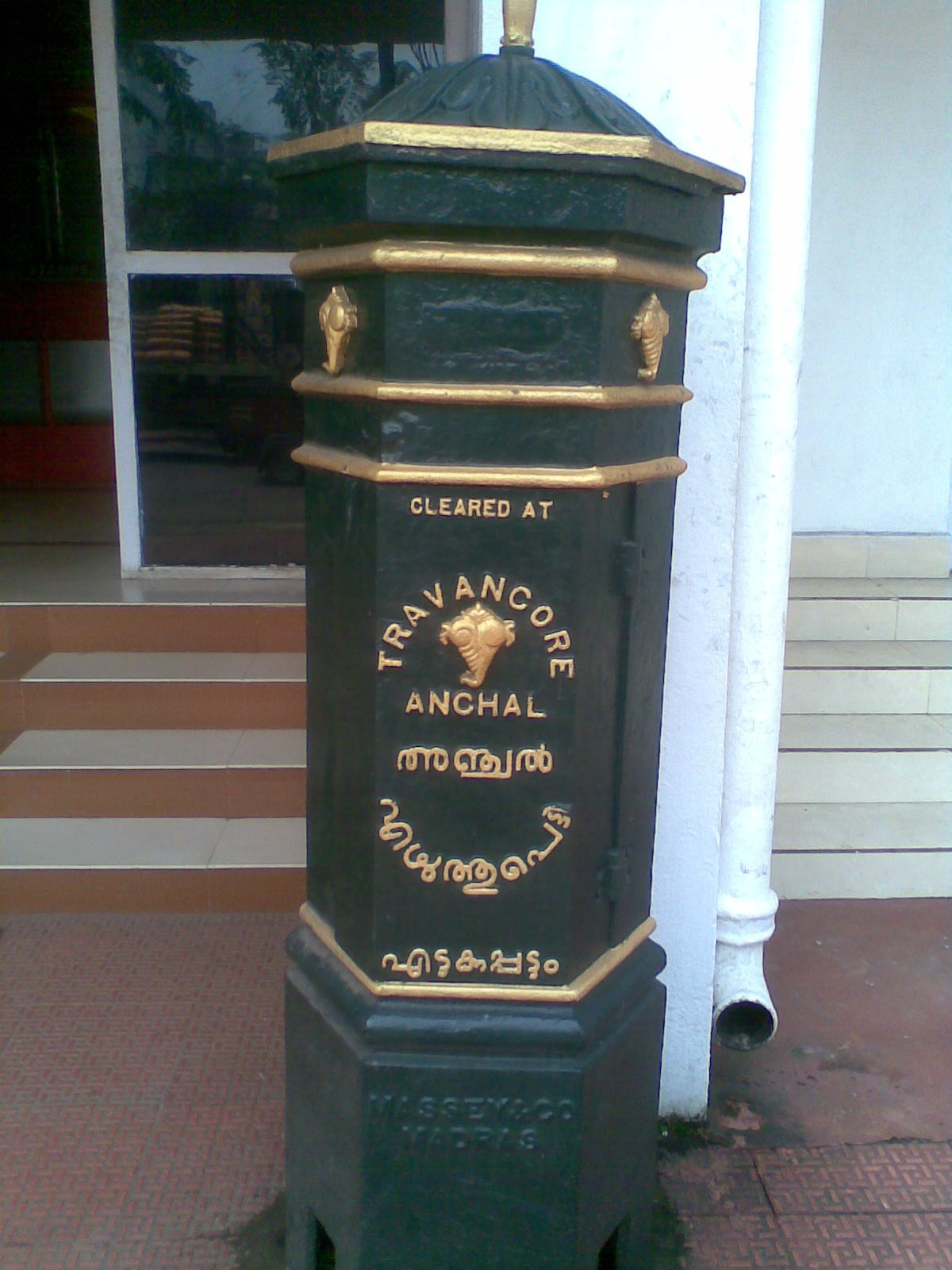
Anchal box at Kottayam

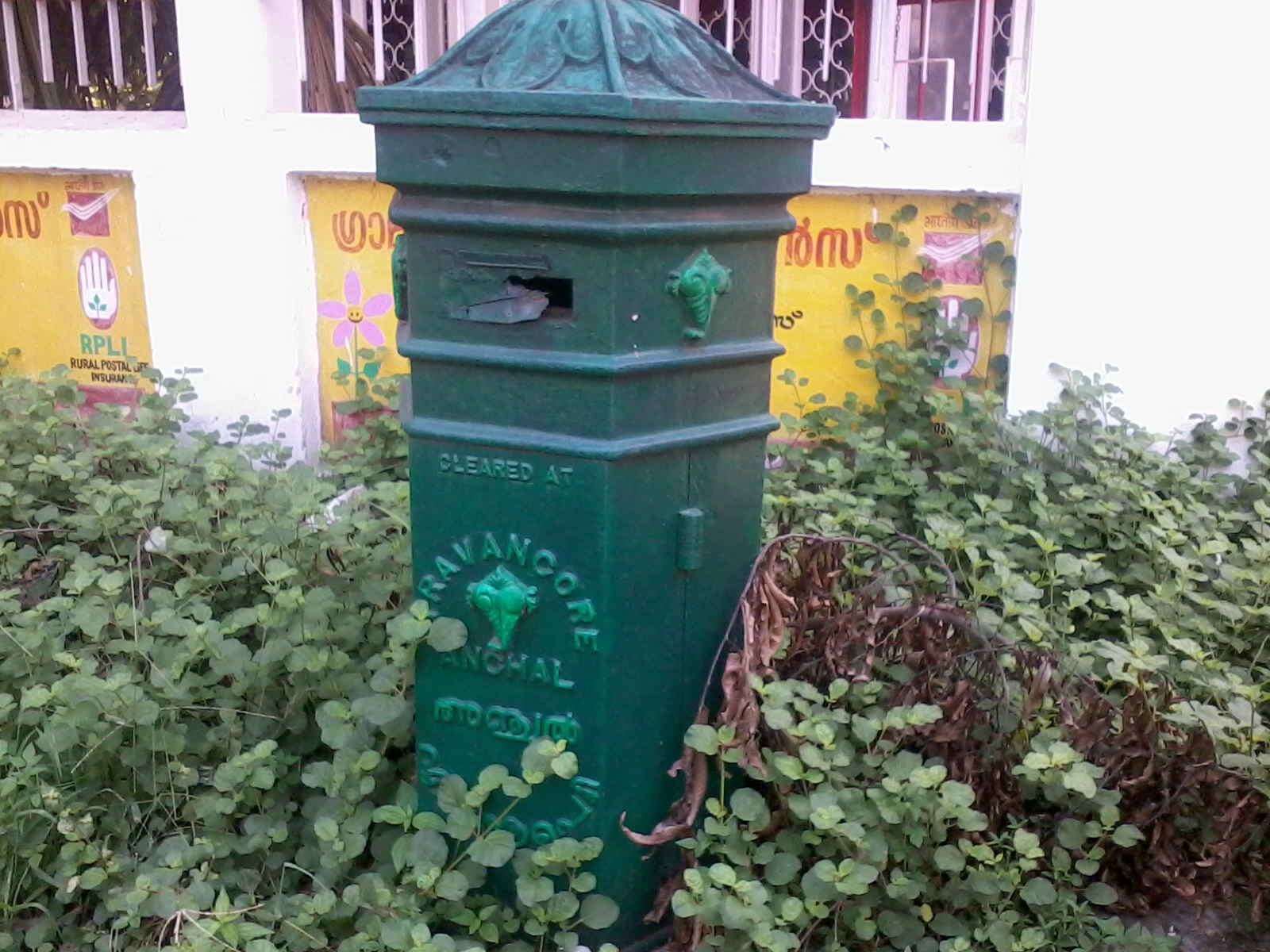
Anchal Box at Vaikom head post office
