= Kaliyar =

- village
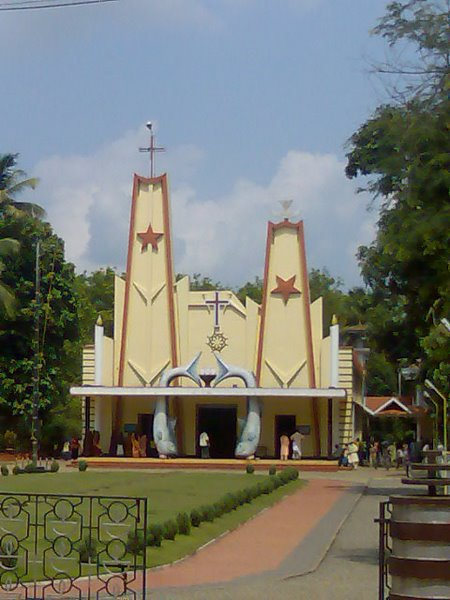
- Kaliyar church

- Location within Kerala Location within India
- Coordinates: 9.983°N 76.783°E
- Country: India
- State: Kerala
- District: Idukki

Population (2001)
  - Total: 27,449

Languages
  - Official: Malayalam, English
- Time zone: UTC+5:30 (IST)
- PIN: 685607
- Telephone code: 0486
- Vehicle registration: KL-38
- Nearest city: Thodupuzha , Muvattupuzha, Kothamangalam, Idukki
- Lok Sabha constituency: Idukki
- Vidhan Sabha constituency: Thodupuzha
- Climate: Tropical monsoon (Köppen)
- Avg. summer temperature: 32.5 °C (90.5 °F)
- Avg. winter temperature: 20 °C (68 °F)

Kaliyar is a small village in the Idukki district, Kerala, India.
