= Pattimattom =

Pattimattom (Kunnathunadu), Perumbavoor
- village
- Location in Kerala, India Pattimattom (Kunnathunadu), Perumbavoor (India)
- Coordinates: 10.025484°N 76.450736°E
- Country: India
- State: Kerala
- District: Ernakulam

Government
  - Body: Panchayath

Population (2011)
  - Total: 21,595

Languages
  - Official: Malayalam, English
- Time zone: UTC+5:30 (IST)
- Vehicle registration: KL40
- Nearest city: Kochi
- Literacy: above 90%
- Climate: moderate (Köppen)

Pattimattom also called Kaithakadu is a village in Kunnathunadu, Ernakulam district in the Indian state of Kerala. It is situated 17 km northwest of Muvattupuzha at the junction of Kolenchery-Perumbavoor Road and SH41 Palarivattom-Muvattupuzha Road. It is one of the main parts of Perumbavoor, situated in the middle of both Perumbavoor and Kolenchery.

== Demographics ==
As of 2011 India census, Pattimattom had a population of 21595 with 10766 males and 10829 females.
