= Mulavoor =

- panchayath
- Location in Kerala, India Mulavoor (India)
- Coordinates: 10°0′40″N 76°36′20″E
- india: India
- State: Kerala
- District: Ernakulam
- Established: 14-1-2015
- Founder: Babu Paul MLA

Population (2011)
  - Total: 33,901

Languages
  - Official: Malayalam, English
- Time zone: UTC+5:30 (IST)
- <686673 PIN -->: 686673
- 2011 census code: 628021

Mulavoor is a village under Paipra Gram Panchayat in Muvattupuzha, Ernakulam district in the Indian state of Kerala. It is a semi-urban area in Muvattupuzha town. Mulavoor village has many educational institutions, like Ilahia Engineering College, Ilahiya College of Management Studies, Govt. U.P. School Mulavoor, MSM U.P. School, etc. The village has many business organisations like KNS Timbers Mulavoor, Marangattu Cashews, Mulattu Cashews, etc. Mulavoor Chandanakkudam and the Ulsavam of Arecadu Bhagavathi Temple are the festivals of Mulavoor.

== Demographics ==
According to the 2011 census of India, the Mulavoor village has 7915 households. The literacy rate of the village is 82.94%.

Demographics (2011 Census)
	Total	Male	Female
Population	33901	16973	16928
Children aged below 6 years	3822	1948	1874
Scheduled caste	1978	958	1020
Scheduled tribe	99	56	43
Literates	28117	14430	13687
Workers (all)	12122	9563	2559
Main workers (total)	10524	8764	1760
Main workers: Cultivators	636	596	40
Main workers: Agricultural labourers	804	633	171
Main workers: Household industry workers	235	182	53
Main workers: Other	8849	7353	1496
Marginal workers (total)	1598	799	799
Marginal workers: Cultivators	67	40	27
Marginal workers: Agricultural labourers	280	192	88
Marginal workers: Household industry workers	144	23	121
Marginal workers: Others	1107	544	563
Non-workers	21779	7410	14369
