= Muthalakodam =

- suburb
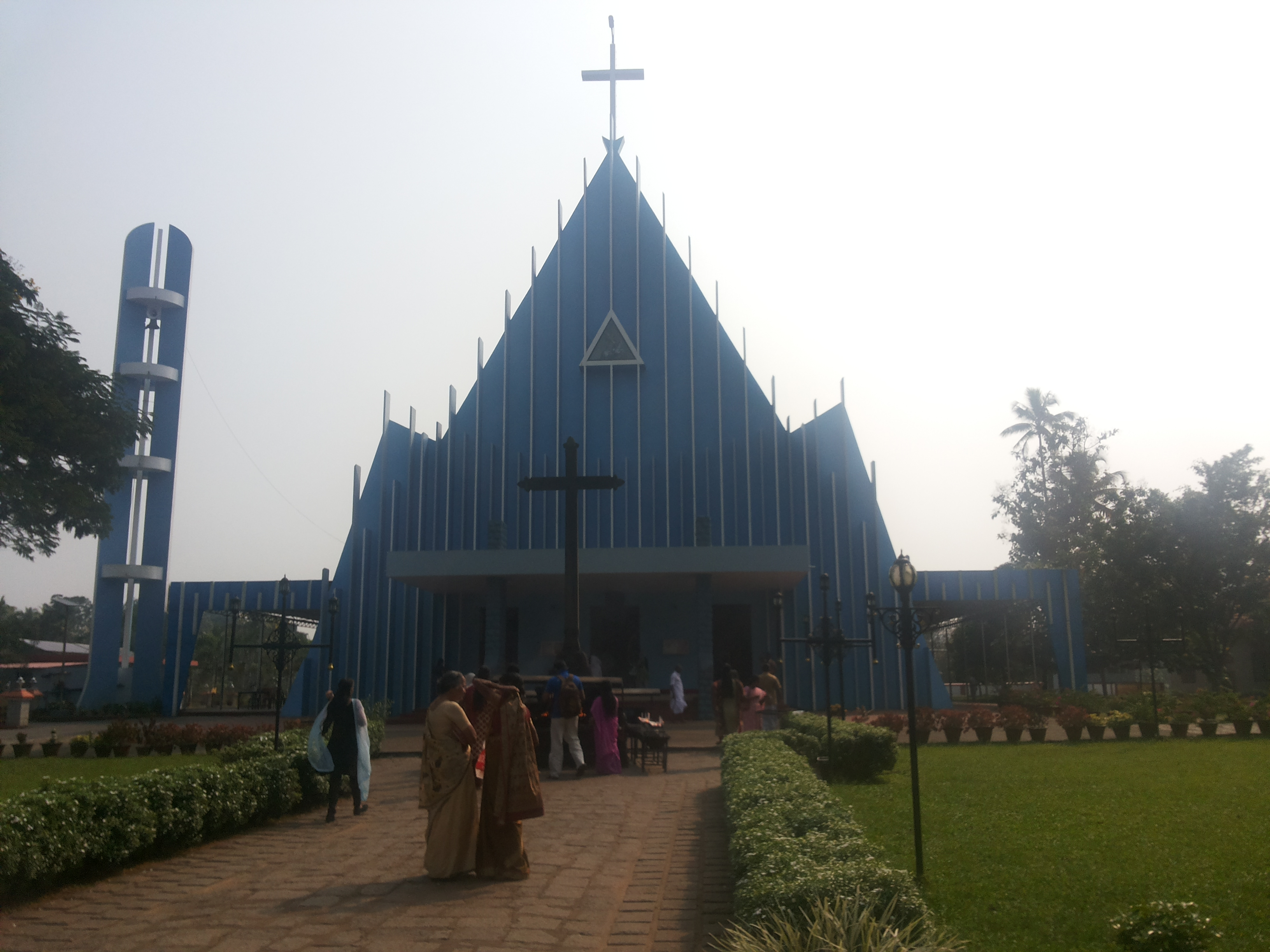

- Location in Kerala, India
- Coordinates: 9°54′35″N 76°44′0″E
- Country: India
- State: Kerala
- District: Idukki

Languages
  - Official: Malayalam, English
- Time zone: UTC+5:30 (IST)
- Vehicle registration: KL-38

Muthalakodam is a suburb located 3 kilometres (1.9 mi) east of Thodupuzha Town, in Idukki district in the Indian state of Kerala.

== Holy Family Hospital ==
Holy Family Hospital was founded on 1971 and is managed by Sacred Heart Sisters, Jyothi Province, Kothamangalam. It is an ISO 9001:2008 certified institution, with 24 hours emergency and trauma care service, blood bank, interventional cardiology, general and neuro surgery, orthopedics, obstetrics and has 400 beds. This non-profit multi specialty hospital caters the medical needs of people from all over idukki district. This hospital offers MSc Nursing, B.Sc. Nursing and General nursing courses.

== St George Higher Secondary School ==
This school is a minority institution owned by the corporate educational agency, Diocese of Kothamangalam and locally run by St George Forane Church. The high school started in 1976 and the Higher Secondary wing in 1998. The Higher Secondary section has an intake of 350 students per year and is the leading +2 school in Idukki district.

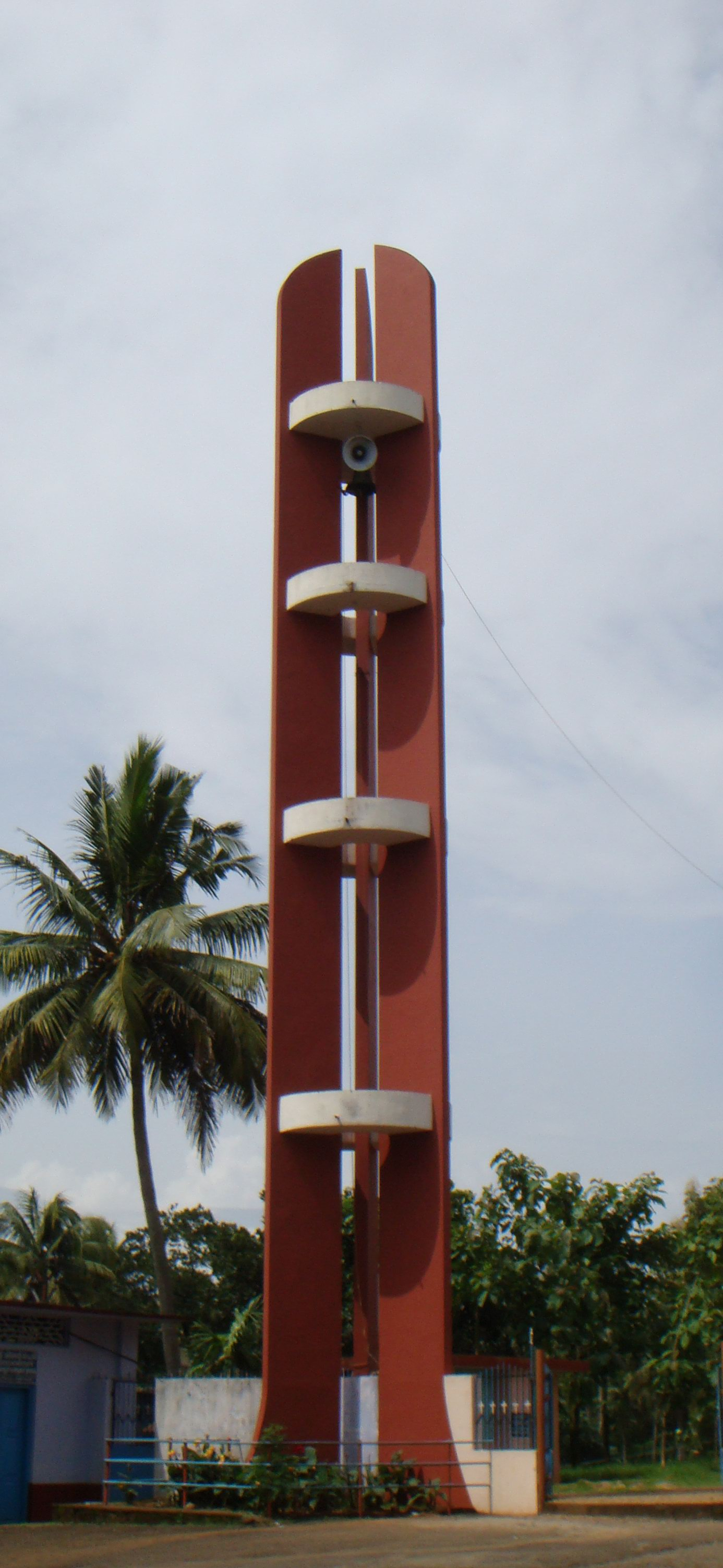
Bell tower at the Muthalakodam Church
