= Central Mahallu Juma Masjid =

Mosque in Muvattupuzha, Kerala, India

- सेंट्रल महल्लु जुमा मस्जिद, मूवाट्टुपुड़ा
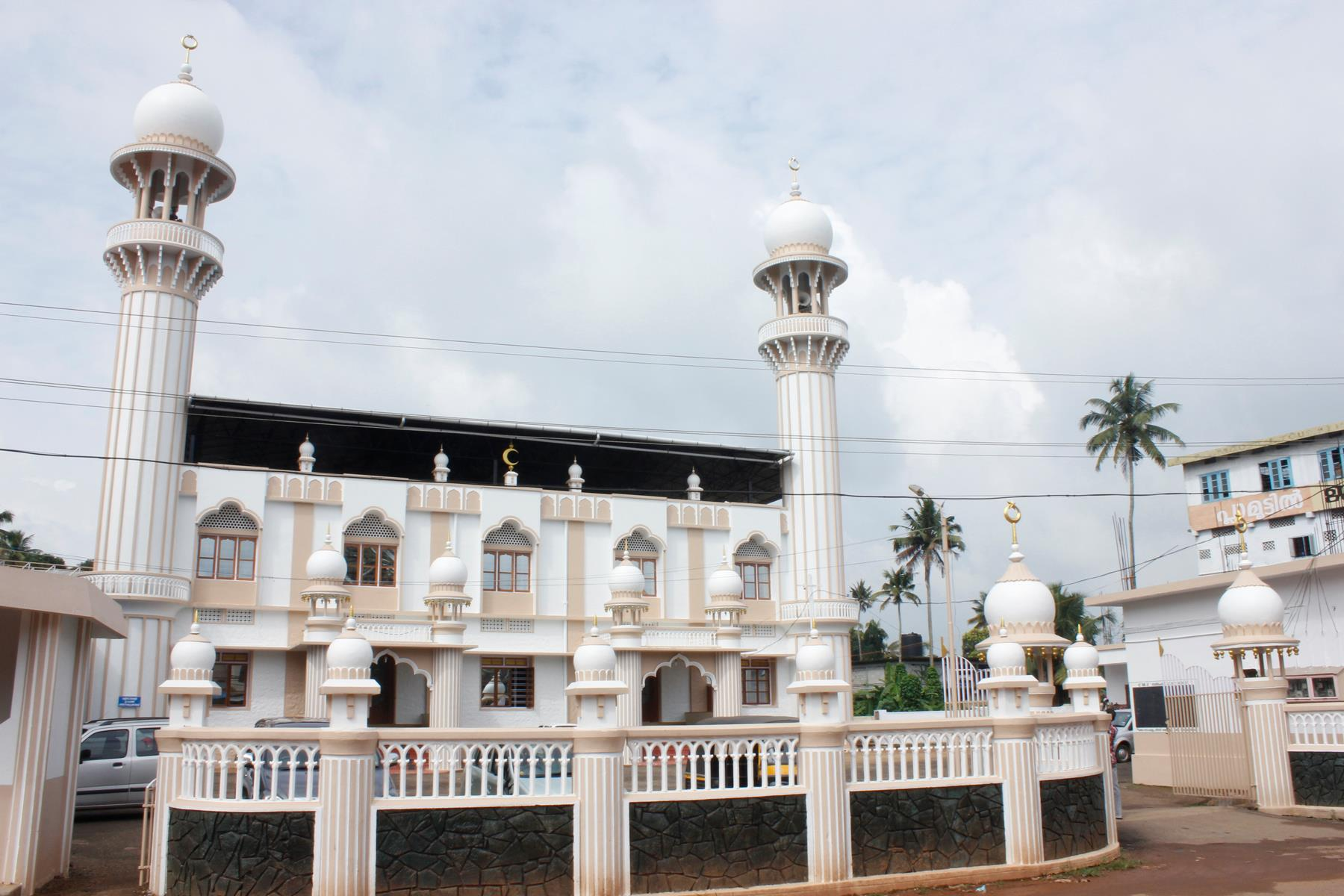
- The mosque in 2013, following renovations

- Location of the mosque in Kerala

Religion
- Affiliation: Sunni Islam
- Rite: Shafi'i
- Ecclesiastical or organizational status: Mosque
- Status: Active

Location
- Location: Muvattupuzha, Ernakulam district, Kerala
- Country: India
- Interactive map of Central Mahallu Juma Masjid
- Coordinates: 9°59′23″N 76°35′0″E

Architecture
- Type: Mosque architecture
- Style: Semi-modern architecture
- Completed: 1346 AH (1927/1928 CE)
- Minaret: Two

The Central Mahallu Juma Masjid (Hindi: सेंट्रल महल्लु जुमा मस्जिद, मूवाट्टुपुड़ा), also known as Central Mahallu Jama'ath, is a Shafi'i Sunni Friday mosque, located in Muvattupuzha, in the Ernakulam district of the state of Kerala, India. The mosque is located adjacent to the Kavumkara market.

Abbreviated as CMJ, the congregation aims to purge poverty and diseases, and assists poor and helpless people by eradicating unemployment, instituting educational reforms, and leading the Islamic society in the path of glory. The CMJ mainly focuses on social and welfare activities.

The land for the mosque was purchased in early 1927; and on 19 February 1927 (27 Sha'aban 1346 AH), the first Jumu'ah Namaz was held in the mosque building.

== Membership ==
According to 2011–2021 Census data, the Mahal consists of eleven blocks which includes 1,824 families and approximately 8,960 members (4,594 men and 4,366 women). All Mahallu members cooperate in the development and welfare activities of the community.

== Gallery ==
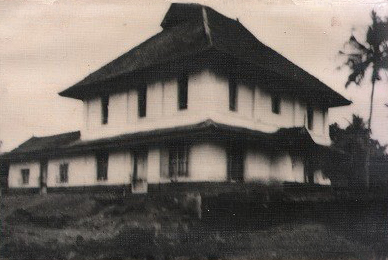
The mosque, before renovation

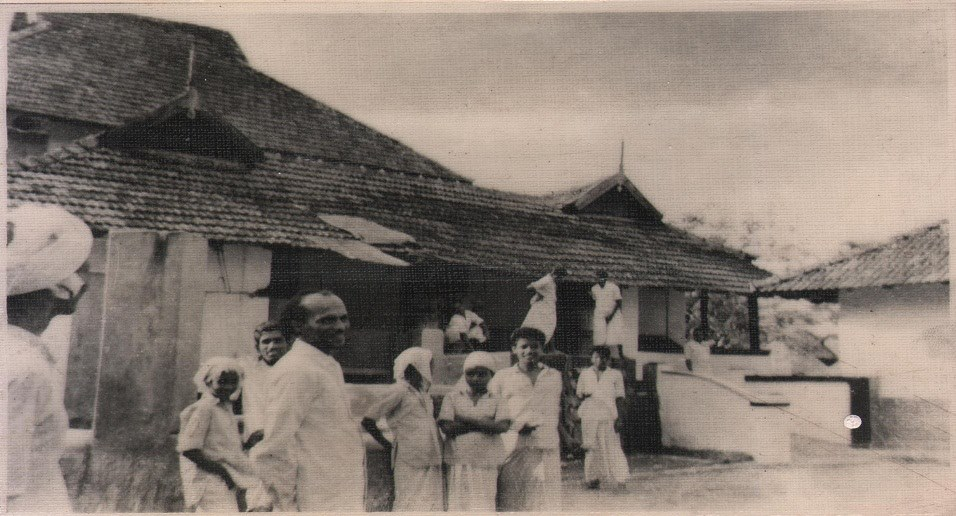
The mosque, before renovation

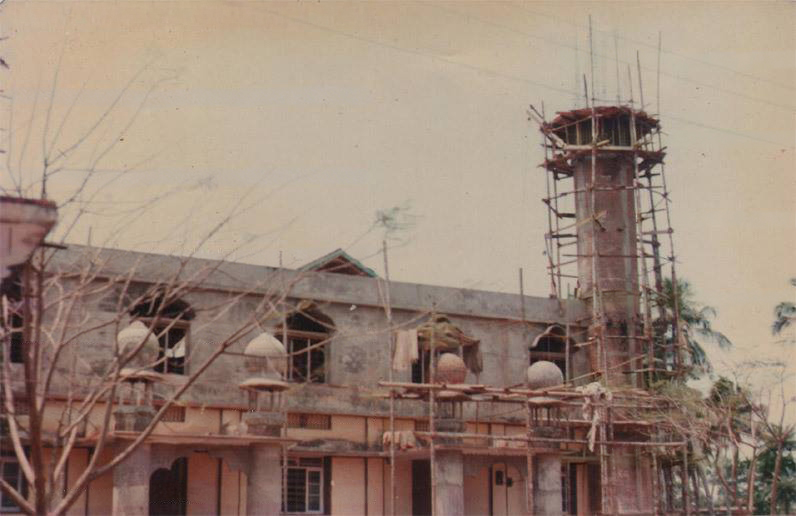
The mosque, during renovations

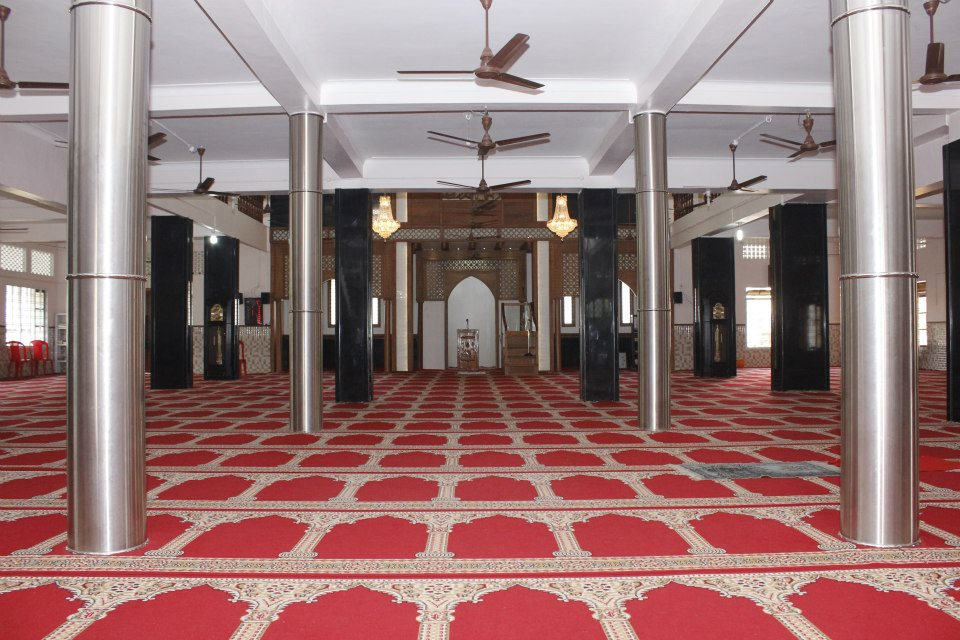
The interior of the prayer hall

== See also ==
- Islam in India
- List of mosques in India
- List of mosques in Kerala
