= Muvattupuzha =

Muvattupuzha മൂവാറ്റുപുഴ
- Municipality
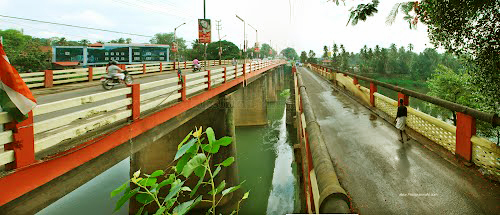
- Muvattupuzha Old and New Bridges

- Location in Kerala Location in India
- Coordinates: 9.99051°N 76.57891°E
- Country: India
- State: Kerala
- District: Ernakulam

Government
  - Type: Second Grade Municipality
  - Municipal Chairman: P P Eldhose

Area
  - Total: 13.18 km^{2} (5.09 sq mi)
- Elevation: 15 m (49 ft)

Population (2011)
  - Total: 30,397
  - Density: 2,306/km^{2} (5,973/sq mi)

Languages
  - Official: Malayalam, English
- Time zone: UTC+5:30 (IST)
- PIN: 686661(Kacherithazham), 686673(Velloorkunnam), 686662, 63, 64, 65, 66, 67, 68, 69, 70, 71 (Adivad), 72, 682316, 682308
- Telephone code: 0485
- Vehicle registration: KL-17
- Nearest city: Kochi
- Sex ratio: 1023 ♂/♀
- Legislative assembly constituency: Muvattupuzha
- Lok Sabha constituency: Idukki
- Climate: Tropical monsoon (Köppen)
- Avg. summer temperature: 32.5 °C (90.5 °F)
- Avg. winter temperature: 20 °C (68 °F)
- Website: muvattupuzhamunicipality.lsgkerala.gov.in/en

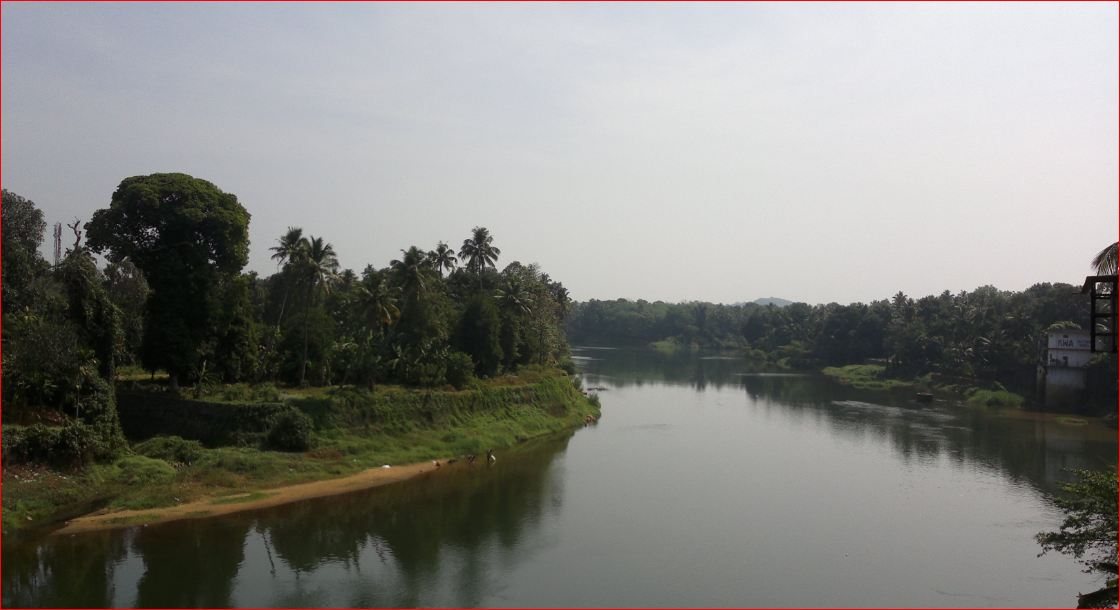
Muvattupuzha River

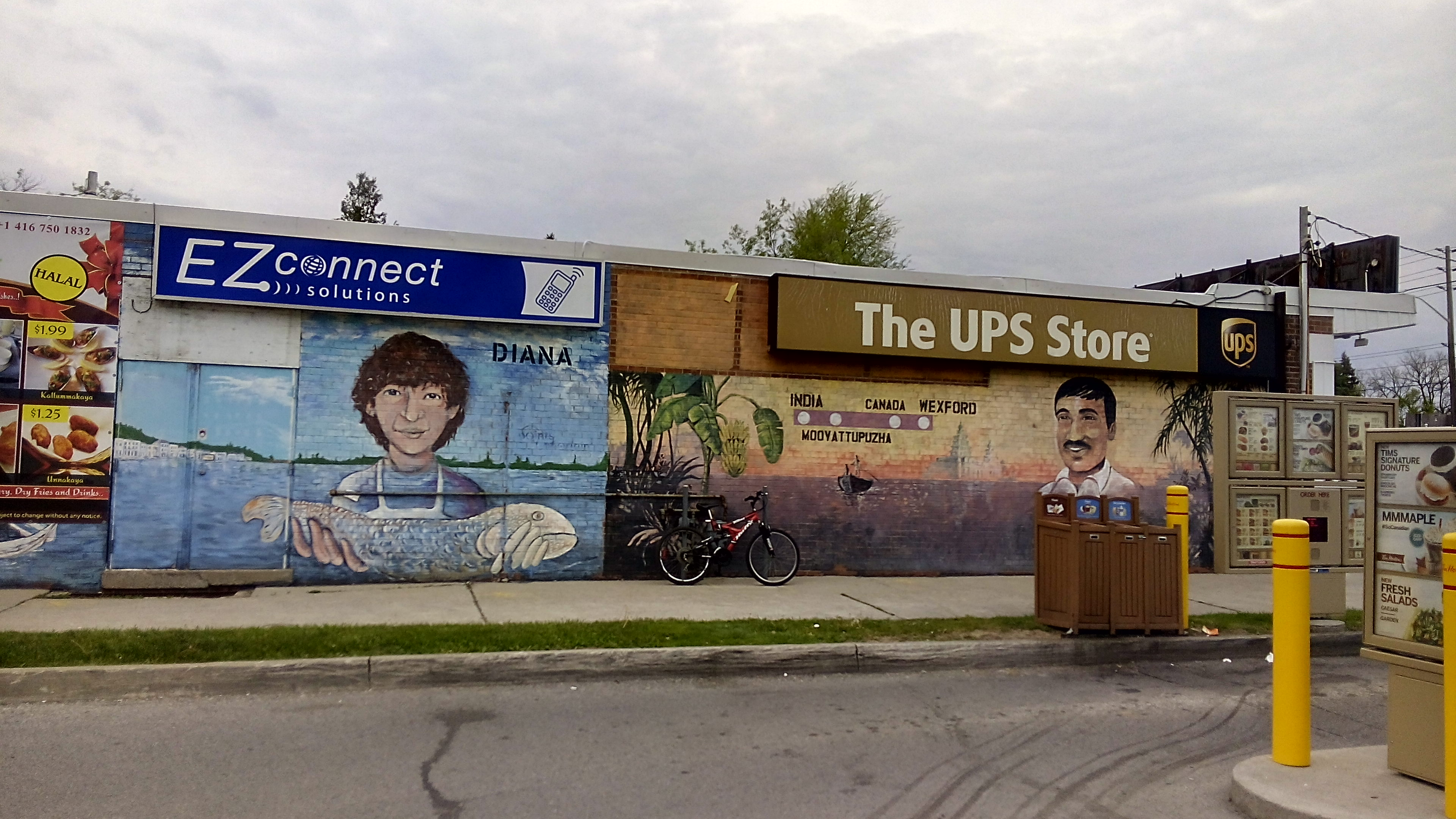
The name Moovattupuzha written on a wall in Toronto Canada

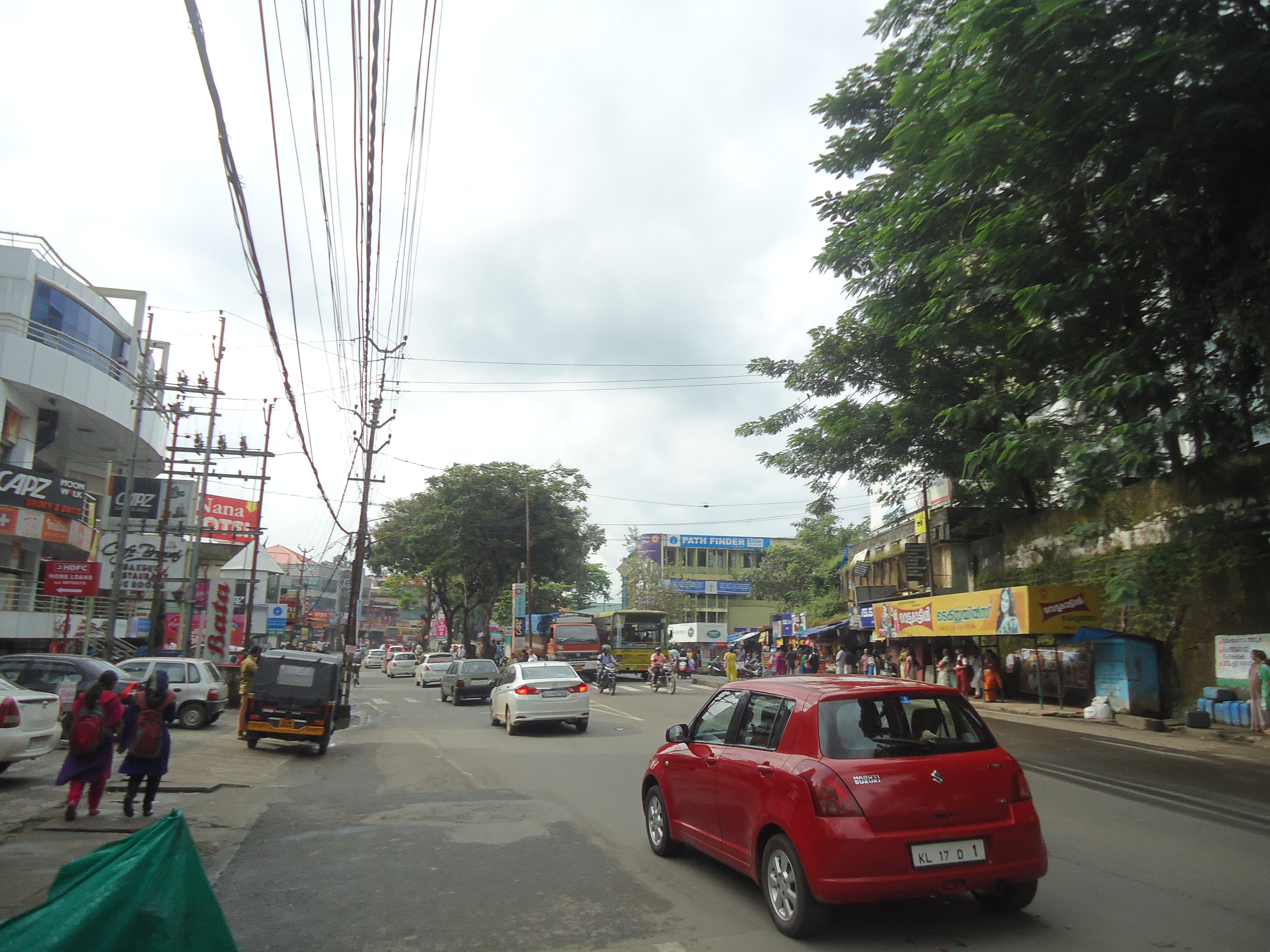
Muvattupuzha Town (Kacherithazham)

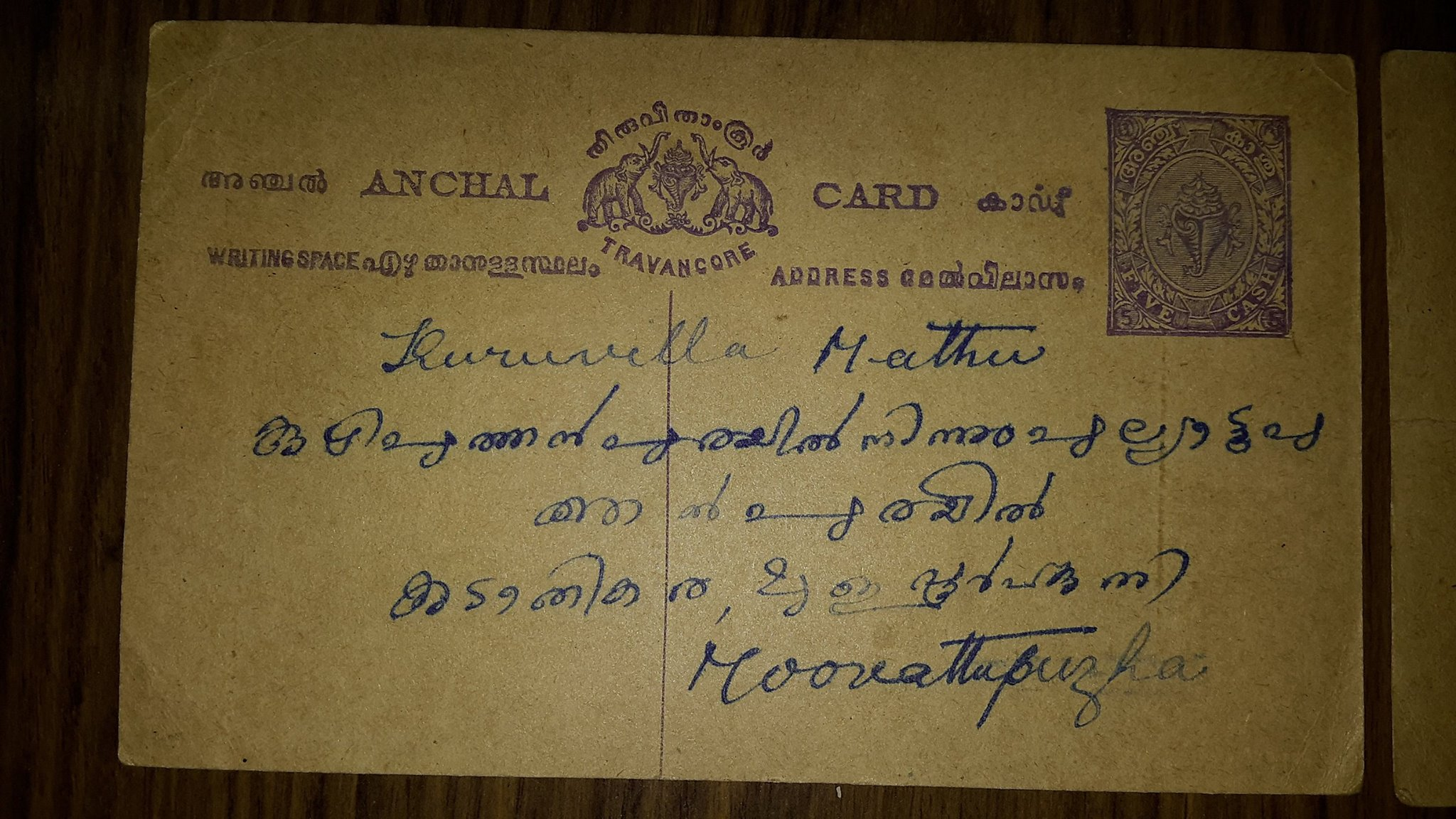
Anchal Post with spelling Moovattupuzha

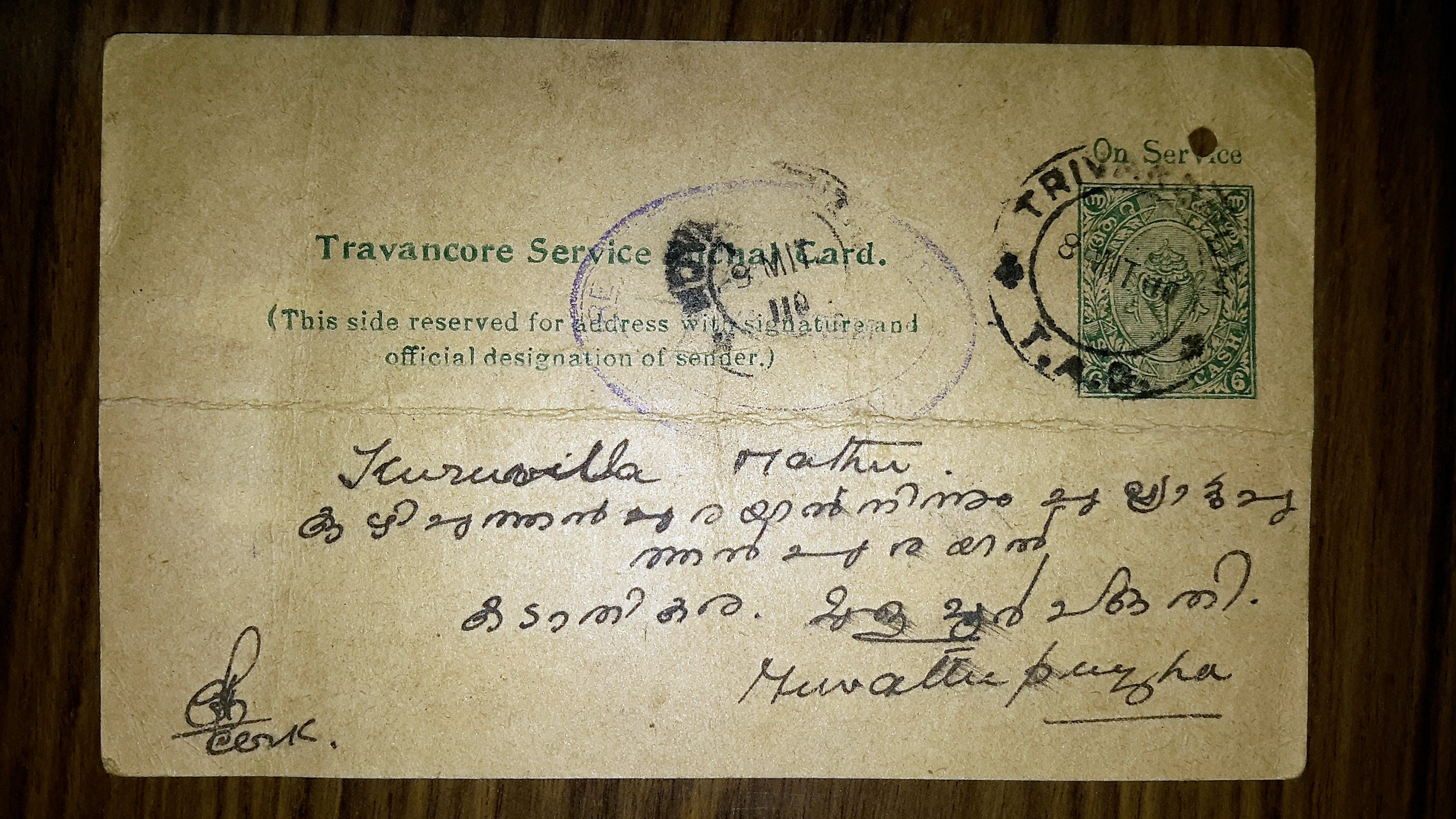
Anchal Post with spelling Muvattupuzha

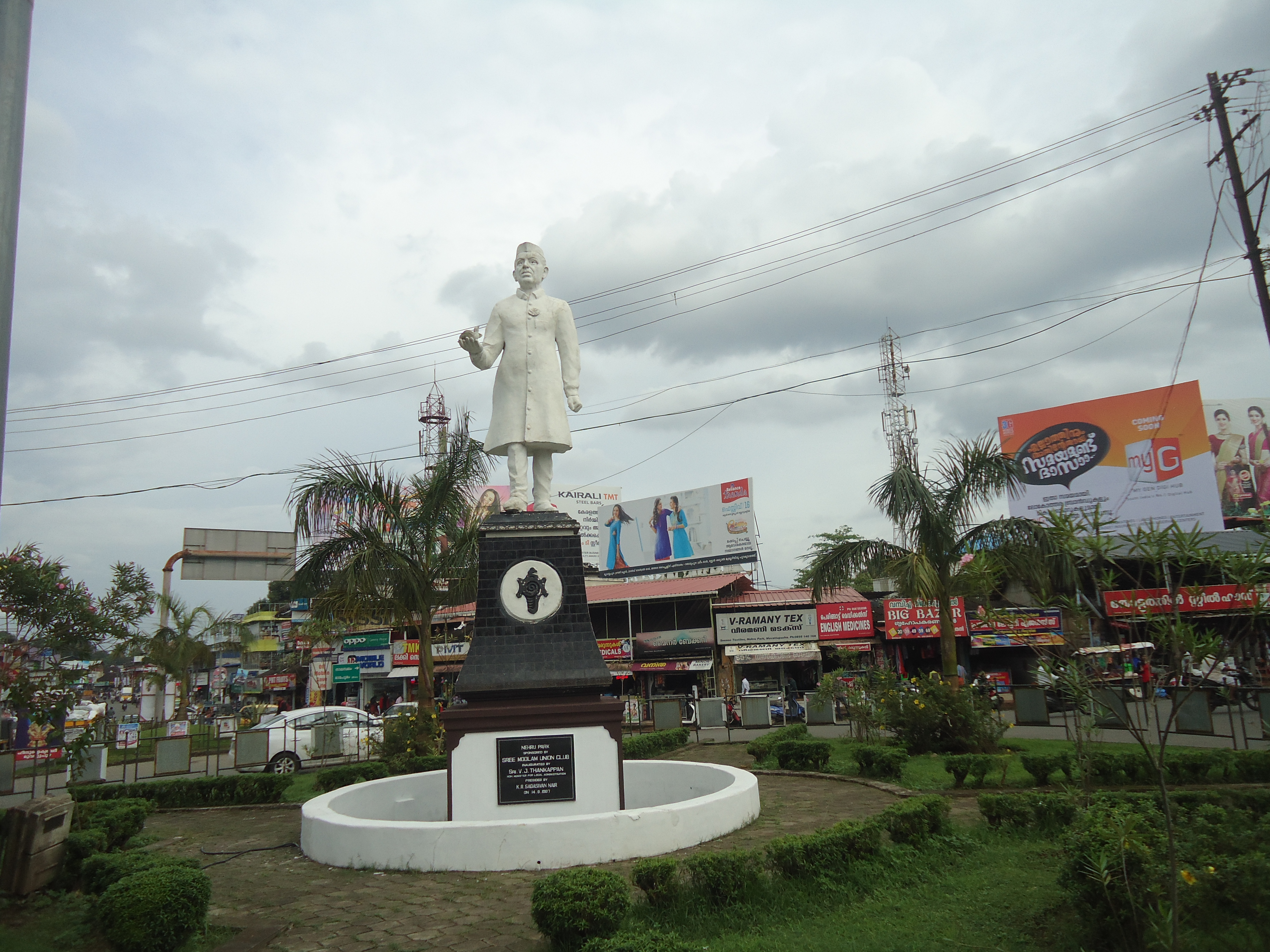
Statue of Nehru in Nehru Park

Muvattupuzha ([muʋɐːt̺ːupuɻɐ]) is a municipality in the Ernakulam district of Kerala, India. It is located 35 km (21.7 mi) east of the district headquarters in Thrikkakara and about 204 km (126.8 mi) north of the state capital Thiruvananthapuram. As per the 2011 census of India, Muvattupuzha has a population of 30,397 people, out of which 15,010 are males and 15,387 are females and a population density of 2,306/km^{2} (5,970/sq mi).

Muvattupuzha is bordered by Kottayam district to the south and Idukki district to the east. The town lies at the intersection of the MC Road and National Highway 49, approximately 28 km (17 mi) from the district headquarters at Ernakulam. It is situated 20 km (12 mi) from Thodupuzha, 17 km (11 mi) from Koothattukulam, and 5 km (3.1 mi) from Arakuzha.

== Etymology ==
The town is named after the Muvattupuzha River, which flows through it. The name is derived from three Malayalam words: Moonnu (three), aaru (small river), and puzha (river). The terms aaru and puzha both mean river, with aaru more commonly used in southern Kerala and puzha in the northern parts. The three rivers – the Kothayar, Kaliyar, and Thodupuzhayar – merge to form the Muvattupuzha River. Their confluence is known as Thriveni Sangamam in Malayalam, meaning "the meeting place of three rivers".

In English, both spellings "Muvattupuzha" and "Moovattupuzha" are used interchangeably. Locally, the name is sometimes pronounced as "Moovattoozha".

== History ==
Muvattupuzha was part of the Vadakkumkur kingdom until it was annexed by the Kingdom of Travancore. Historical records indicate that parts of the land in the area originally belonged to the Edappally Swaroopam and were later transferred to local Brahmin families (Manas).

After Indian independence, from 1949 to 1956, Muvattupuzha was a part of the Kottayam district in Travancore-Cochin state. In 1956, when Kerala state was formed, Muvattupuzha remained as a part of Kottayam district until 1958, when Ernakulam district was formed on 1 April 1958. Muvattupuzha, as a village union, came under the control of a council of three members nominated by the Government. V. P. Govindan Nair was the first president of the village union. By 1953, Muvattupuzha was declared a panchayat.Kunnappillil Varkey Vaidyan was the first president of the elected panchayat committee. Muvattupuzha was elevated to municipality status in 1958, with N. Parameshwaran Nair serving as its first municipal chairman. It was the first municipality in which the Communist Party of India came to power through a general election.

N. P. Varghese was the first elected Member of the Legislative Assembly (MLA) from Muvattupuzha Assembly Constituency, who defeated Manjunatha Prabhu of the Communist Party. Later, K. M. George, founder of Kerala Congress, represented Muvattupuzha.The first Member of Parliament (MP) representing the Muvattupuzha Lok Sabha constituency was George Thomas Kottukapally. The first president of the Muvattupuzha Block Panchayat was Shyson P. Manguzha, elected in 1995 from the Arakuzha division.

St. Thomas, the apostle who introduced Christianity to India, is believed to have visited this region. The Marth Mariam Syro-Malabar Catholic Church of Arakuzha has a recorded history of over 1,000 years, making it one of the oldest Syrian churches in Kerala. It is known for its paintings and sculptures. Muvattupuzha was also known as Arakuzha Pakuthi (meaning half of Arakuzha).

== Demographics ==
As of 2011 census, Muvattupuzha had a population of 30,397, of which 15,010 were males and 15,387 were females. Muvattupuzha Municipality has an area of 13.18 km^{2} (5.09 sq mi) with 7,414 families residing in it.

As of the 2011 Census of India, children aged 0–6 years numbered 2,945, constituting 9.69% of the total population of Muvattupuzha. The literacy rate of the town was 96.11%, higher than the state average of 94.00%. Male literacy stood at 97.20%, while female literacy was 95.07%.

== Religion ==
Religions in Muvattupuzha Municipality(2011)
Religion	Percent(%)
Hindu	39.91%
Muslim	38.82%
Christian	21.1%
Not stated	0.14%
Others	0.03%

The region has Hindus, Syrian Christians, and Mappila Muslims.

Kavumpady Road in the town centre has a significant concentration of Kerala Iyer (Tamil Brahmin) households, forming one of the notable agraharams in the region. A smaller Konkani community is also present. Hindus form the majority of the population in the taluk, with communities such as Nair, Ezhava, Nambudiri, and Pulaya among those represented.

Syrian Christians include a majority of Syro-Malabar Catholics and Jacobites. There are Malankara Orthodox Syrian Church, Syro-Malankara Catholics, Marthomites and Pentecostal. Muvattupuzha is the seat of the Muvattupuzha diocese of Malankara Jacobite Syrian Orthodox Church and Malankara Orthodox Syrian Church of the Kandanad East diocese. There is a small Latin Catholic community also in Muvattupuzha whose church was established in 1925, situated in Vazhappilly.

Most of the Muslim population in the area belongs to the Mappila community. The Kothamangalam–Muvattupuzha region is an important centre for Malayali Muslims. The Perumattam Juma Masjid, regarded as the first mosque in the eastern part of the district, is located in Muvattupuzha taluk. Local tradition attributes its construction to a 16th-century Sufi saint known as Valiyupappa, whose dargah (tomb) is situated within the mosque premises.

== Geography ==
The town and western parts of the region are mainly plains and is culturally similar to Ernakulam, whereas the eastern parts are mainly highlands. The regions of Thodupuzha, Muvattupuzha, and Kothamangalam are called sub-high ranges or keezhmalanad of Vadakkumkoor Kingdom, indicating they were lands with fertile soil deposited by the Thodupuzha and Muvattupuzha rivers from flooding. Muvattupuzha and nearby areas are less hilly and fertile. The altitude is lower and the hilly region is the Kadalikkad-Meenkunnam-Pampakkuda curved region. The town is 20 m (66 ft) above mean sea level.

The towns of Thodupuzha and Palai are often described as part of the sub-high ranges or low ranges, lying in the foothills of the Western Ghats. These areas are connected by State Highway 8 (the Punalur–Muvattupuzha road), which meets other major routes at Muvattupuzha. Nine major roads converge at the town, providing connectivity in multiple directions.

=== Muvattupuzha river ===
The Muvattupuzha river (Malayalam: മൂവാറ്റുപുഴയാർ) starts in the Idukki highranges and flows through Muvattupuzha, running 121 km (75 mi) before entering the Kottayam district. The main source of water for the region is the Thodupuzha River, which originates in Idukki district and provides a perennial supply. The river benefits from water released from the Idukki Dam, the largest arch dam in India, which is primarily used for hydroelectric power generation.

=== Muvattupuzha Bridge ===
In 1914, the first concrete bridge in Asia was built in Muvattupuzha under the supervision of the British engineer W.H. Emrald. It is said that on its inauguration, to convince others of the strength and stability of the bridge, Emrald and his wife sat beneath the bridge in a boat while 15 elephants walked over it. This bridge connects Nehru Park and Kacherithazham. In earlier times, a wooden bridge across the Muvattupuzha River carried steam bus traffic between Muvattupuzha and Ernakulam. The border with the former Kochi state was located at Chungam, near Mamala and Thiruvankulam. Until the late 1970s, vehicles used the old concrete bridge, with traffic police outposts on both sides regulating one-way movement. A new bridge was constructed in the 1970s, and by the late 1970s, traffic was diverted to a wider two-way bridge.

== Politics ==
Muvattupuzha is one of the 140 legislative assembly constituencies of Kerala state. Its assembly constituency is part of Idukki (Lok Sabha constituency) and the current MP is Dean Kuriakose of Indian National Congress. The major political parties active in Muvattupuzha include the Indian National Congress, Kerala Congress (M), CPI(M), CPI, Indian Union Muslim League, and BJP. As of 2026, Mathew Kuzhalnadan of the Indian National Congress represents the Muvattupuzha Assembly constituency in the Kerala Legislative Assembly.

Administratively, Muvattupuzha is a municipality. As of 2020, the municipal council was led by the Indian National Congress, with P. P. Eldose serving as municipal chairperson.

Notable political figures associated with Muvattupuzha include K. M. George, a former minister and the founder of the Kerala Congress, and P. P. Esthose, a former Member of Parliament and Member of the Legislative Assembly. Other leaders from the area include Mathew Kuzhalnadan, Johny Nelloor, Francis George (former MP), and Gopi Kottamurikkal (former MLA and Ernakulam district secretary of the CPI(M)).

== Notable people ==
- Madhu Neelakandan, award-winning Indian cinematographer
- K. M. George was a veteran politician and former minister. He was the founder of the Kerala Congress Party and former Muvattupuzha MLA. His son Francis George is former M. P. of Idukki.
- Johnny Nellore is a veteran politician and former MLA of Muvattupuzha from 1991 to 2006. He was the chairman of Kerala Congress (Jacob). Now he is in KC (M) Joseph Faction
- Francis George is a Kerala Congress leader and the present MP of Kottayam. He was also the former MP of Idukki. He is the son of K. M. George.
- Jeethu Joseph, award-winning Indian film director and screenwriter
- Bhagath Manuel, Indian film actor
- Vishak Nair, Indian film actor
- Anoop Kannan, Indian film director & producer
- Kalabhavan Abi, Indian film actor
- Shane Nigam, Indian film actor
- Mathew Kuzhalnadan, Indian MLA of Muvattupuzha
- Arun Bose, Indian film Director

== Places of worship ==
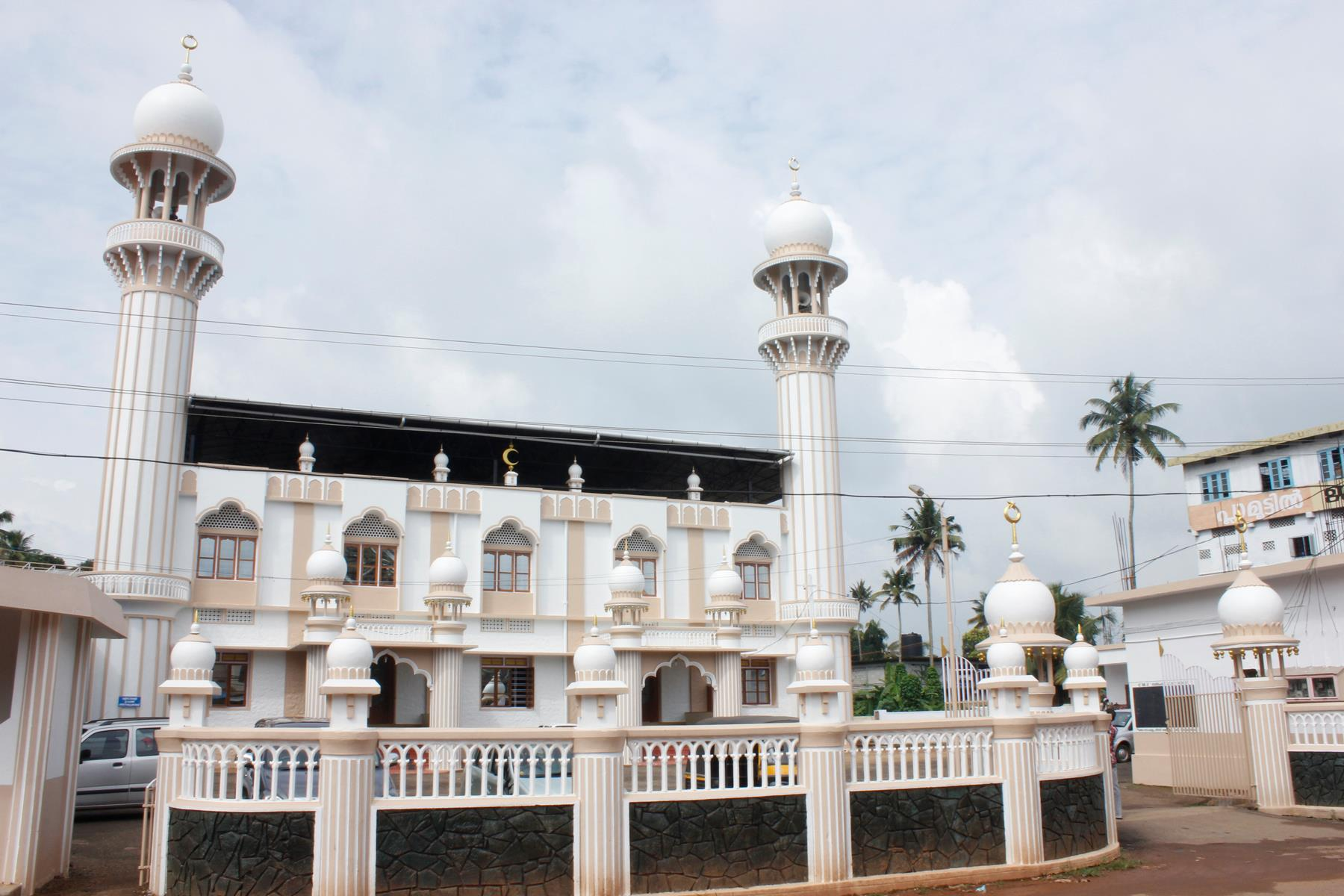
Central Mahallu Jama Masjid

- Marth Mariam Syro-Malabar Catholic Forane Church
- St. George's Church, Kadamattom
- Mappila Muslims following Shafi'i fiqh are the majority in Muvattupuzha, Kothamangalam talukas. the main masjid is Central Mahallu Jama'ath in Kavumkara market.

== Educational organizations ==
- Nirmala College, Muvattupuzha
- Nirmala College of Pharmacy, Muvattupuzha
- School of Architecture Mookambika Technical Campus, Eattappilly, Mannathur P.O
- Mookambika College of Pharmacy Eattappilly, Mannathur P.O
- Ilahia College of Engineering and Technology
- Bharath Open School,P O Junction, Muvattupuzha
- Bharath Education

(NIOS,IGNOU,SGOU Study Centre,Muvattupuzha-686661

== Transport ==
KL-17 is the RTO code for Muvattupuzha taluka, including the town. Auto rickshaws are commonly used for small distances. Taxis are also available. The Cochin International Airport at Nedumbassery is 29 km (18 mi) away from Muvattupuzha town.

Muvattupuzha is well connected by road to major cities in Kerala. It lies in the midlands region stretching from the eastern outskirts of Kochi (near Kakkanad) towards Thodupuzha and Vannappuram. The town has good road accessibility. At present, Muvattupuzha does not have a railway station; however, the proposed Sabari railway line is expected to improve rail connectivity in the region.

Muvattupuzha is a major junction for highways passing through the town. There are nine highways and major roads which join at Muvattupuzha, which include:

- NH 85 (previously NH 49) Kochi–Dhanushkodi passing through Munnar.
- MC Road towards Angamaly connects the town towards northern part of the state such as Thrissur, Palakkad and Kozhikode
- MC Road towards Thiruvananthapuram passing through many important towns in Central Travancore like Kottayam, Changanassery.
- Punalur–Muvattupuzha PM road passing through low ranges (foothills of western ghats) towns like Thodupuzha, Pala, Ponkunnam
- Muvattupuzha–Vaikom–Alappuzha highway through Piravom, Peruva, Thalayolaparambu.
- Muvattupuzha–Theni SH 43 state highway passing through Chalikkadavu, Randattinkara, Kalloorkkad, Udumbannoor.
- Palarivattom–Thekkady SH 41 passing through Kakkanad, Pattimattom, Muvattupuzha, Pandappilly, Arikkuzha, Thodupuzha, Moolamattom, Vagamon
- Muvattupuzha–Kaliyar road passing through Kakkadassery, Pothanikkad, Paingottoor, Vannappuram
- Muvattupuzha has popular transport modes like Uber, Ola Cabs available in recent years due to the importance of the town as a transportation hub.

== Economy ==
Muvattupuzha taluk comprises both midland and highland regions, with agriculture and small-scale industries forming the main economic activities. Historically, the area was part of the Kingdom of Travancore. Border check posts at Mamala, near Thiruvankulam, once restricted interconnectivity between Kochi and Muvattupuzha. The town remained an important commercial centre until the mid-1970s. The 2011 Census of India identified a distinct urban agglomeration covering parts of Muvattupuzha and Kothamangalam taluks.

== Infrastructure ==
Muvattupuzha is between Angamaly and Kottayam on the Main Central Road, The first and second longest state highways of Kerala, Main Central Road (Angamaly - Thiruvananthapuram / SH-01 / 240 km (150 mi)) and Main Eastern Highway (Muvattupuzha–Punalur / SH-08 / 154 km (96 mi)), meet here. The Muvattupuzha–Theni Highway (SH 43) starts at the Chalikkadavu Bridge and goes through Randattinkara, Kotta, Udumbannoor, Kattappana, Nedumkandam and Cumbum before ending at Theni, which is a shorter route to Madurai in neighbouring Tamil Nadu.

A bypass to Thodupuzha Road and MC Road is planned from Kadathi on NH49 via the proposed new bridge at Murikkallu.

=== Suburbs ===
Kizhakkekara and Randaattinkara (also known as Randarkara or Randar) lie on the eastern side of the town along the banks of the Muvattupuzha River. About 9 km (5.6 mi) to the south, the terrain rises into a hilly region of 40–60 m (130–200 ft) above sea level, which crosses the routes towards Kottayam and Piravom. Much of this elevated land is under rubber plantations.

The old Muvattupuzha bridge built over the Muvattupuzha river was the first concrete bridge in Asia, and was completed in 1914. It serves as the connection between Nehru Park and Kacherithazham.

The nearby panchayaths mostly have agriculture and small- and medium-scale industries. Pineapple and rubber plantations are the common agrarian products. Match box industries, plywood factories, saw mills, paper, plastic and wood carton production are the main industries in this area. KINFRA's Small Industries Park in Nellad is 9 km (5.6 mi) from Muvattupuzha on SH41.

Neighbouring cities & towns

== See also ==
- Anikkad
- Arakuzha
- Marady
- Mulavoor
- Perumpalloor
- Valayanchirangara
