= Arakuzha =

- village
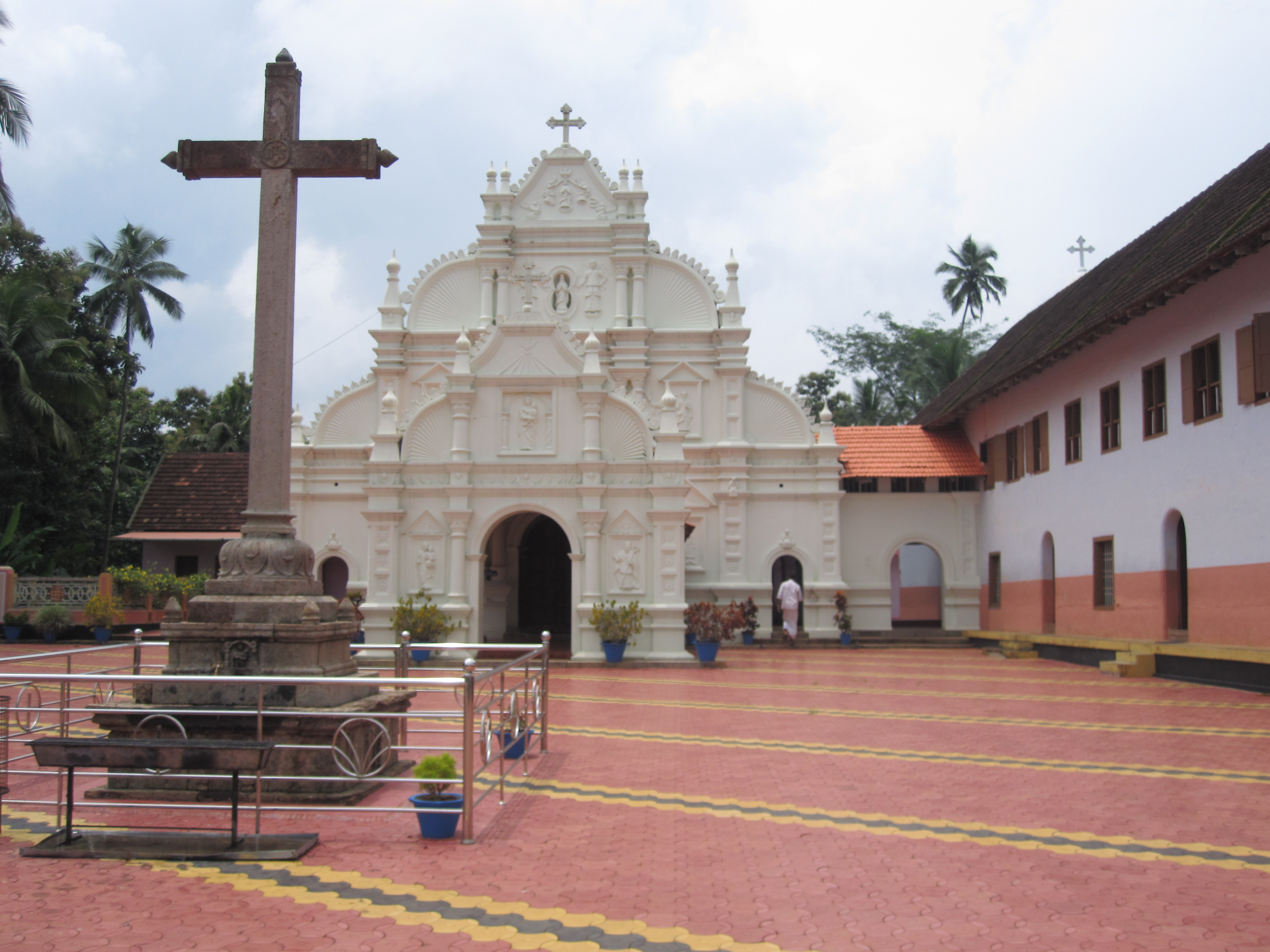
- Marth Mariam Syro-Malabar Church - Aayiram mappilamarku vendi aayirathil vacha palli (The church constructed for thousand Mappilas in AD 1000)

- Location in Kerala Location in India
- Coordinates: 9.92809°N 76.60936°E
- Country: India
- State: Kerala
- District: Ernakulam

Government
  - Body: panchayat

Area
  - Total: 29.31 km^{2} (11.32 sq mi)

Population (2001)
  - Total: 15,000
  - Density: 510/km^{2} (1,300/sq mi)

Language
  - languages: Malayalam, English
- Time zone: UTC+5:30 (IST)
- PIN: 686672
- Telephone code: 91 485
- Vehicle registration: KL-17
- Nearest city: Muvattupuzha, Thodupuzha
- Lok Sabha constituency: Idukki

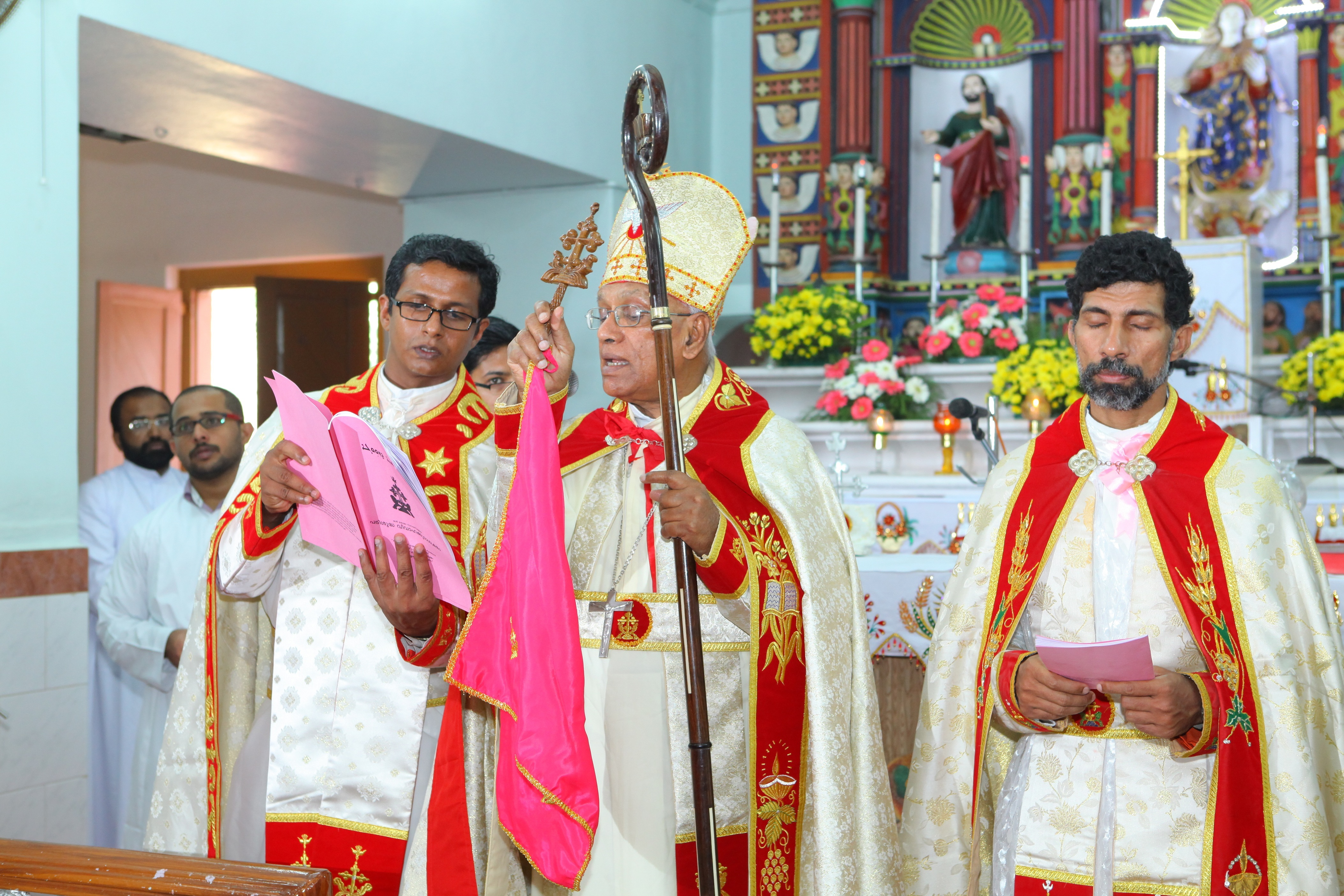
Mar Gregory Karotemprel at Marth Mariam Church, Arakuzha

Arakuzha is a small village situated 6 km from Muvattupuzha in Kerala, India. The State Highway 41 (Kerala) connects Arakuzha with Muvattupuzha and Koothattukulam. The Moozhi Bridge connects Arakuzha to the Pineapple City of India, Vazhakulam, which is also 6 km from Arakuzha. It is located on SH 41, towards Koothattukulam, the alternate route for Main Central Road. St. Mary's High School and St. Joseph's Girls' School are the oldest high schools in Arakuzha. Arakuzha is also home to two Christian pilgrim centres-St. Mary's Forane Church and Malekurish Church. The chief festival is on the first Sunday after Easter.

== History ==
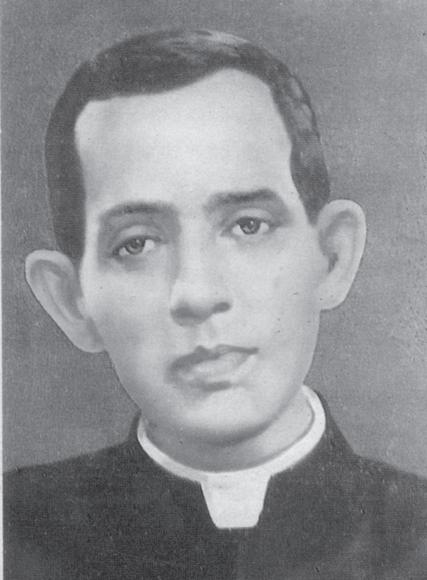
Mar Varghese Payyappilly Palakkappilly

The village has a large population of Syrian Catholic Christians. Marth Mariam Syro-Malabar Catholic Forane Church has an important role in the life of the people. Saint Thomas Christians of Arakuzha have more than 1,500 years of recorded history. This region comprising Kothamangalam, Vazhakulam, Arakuzha, Mylakompu, Nagapuzha, Muthalakodam of erstwhile Travancore kingdom has some very old Syrian churches. Arakuzha, being an ancient Syrian Christian centre has given asylum to many migrant Syrian Christians during the Tipu's persecution of Nasranis. Venerable Mar Varghese Payyappilly Palakkappilly had served as the parish priest of Marth Mariam Church in Arakuzha (1920–22). During his tenure in Arakuzha he started St. Mary's School there. He also purchased 12 acres (49,000 m^{2}) of land in M.C.Road for constructing St. Joseph's Syro-Malabar Catholic Church, Meenkunnam.

Several families migrated to different parts of Kerala, mainly to Malabar and high range areas, in search of agriculture land.

== See also ==
- Muvattupuzha
- Thodupuzha
- Kothamangalam
- Ernakulam
- Mailacompu
- Puthenchira
