= Palarivattom =

Neighbourhood in Ernakulam, Kerala, India

Palarivattom (MRC)
- Neighbourhood
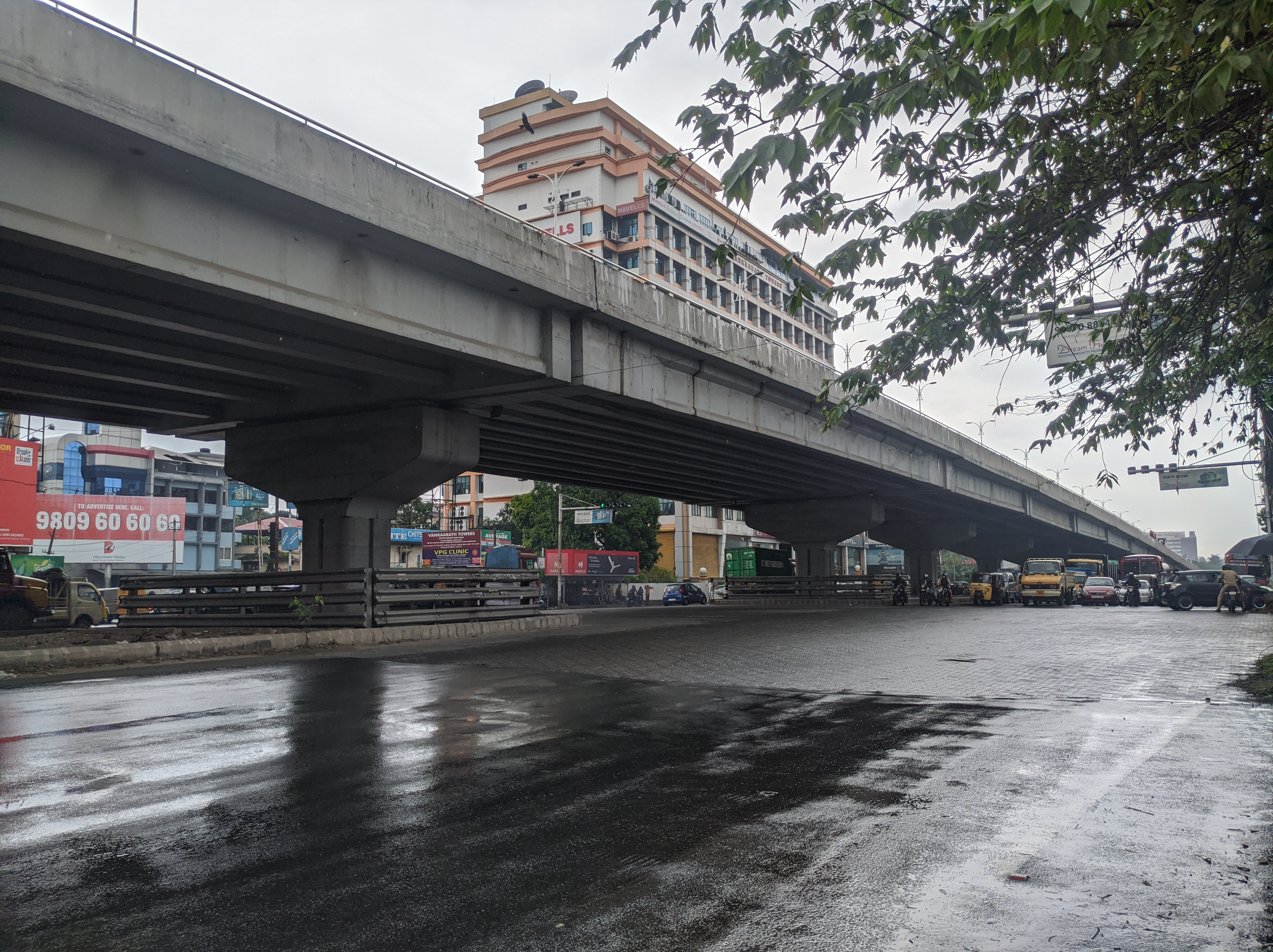
- Palarivattom flyover

- Location in Kerala, India
- Coordinates: 9°59′55″N 76°18′45″E
- Country: India
- State: Kerala
- District: Ernakulam

Government
  - Body: Kochi Corporation

Languages
  - Official: Malayalam, English
- Time zone: UTC+5:30 (IST)
- PIN: 682025
- Telephone code: 0484
- Vehicle registration: KL-07
- Nearest city: Cochin
- Civic agency: Kochi Corporation
- Climate: Monsoon oriented climate with heavy rains during the monsoons (Köppen)

Palarivattom is a major residential and commercial neighborhood in the city of Kochi, Kerala. Located east of Ernakulam's central business district, the neighborhood serves as an important road junction connecting the city center with the eastern suburbs and the IT hub of Kakkanad. The neighborhood is a significant transportation hub, intersected by major arterial roads and served by the Kochi Metro. It is home to a mix of residential developments, educational institutions, healthcare facilities, commercial establishments, and places of worship.
