= Muvattupuzha Assembly constituency =

Constituency of the Kerala legislative assembly in India

Muvattupuzha
- Constituency No. 86 for the Kerala Legislative Assembly
- Muvattupuzha within Ernakulam district

Constituency details
- Country: India
- Region: South India
- State: Kerala
- District: Ernakulam
- Lok Sabha constituency: Idukki
- Established: 1957
- Total electors: 1,86,254 (2026)
- Reservation: None

Member of Legislative Assembly
- 16th Kerala Legislative Assembly
- Incumbent Mathew Kuzhalnadan
- Party: INC
- Alliance: UDF
- Elected year: 2026

Muvattupuzha Assembly constituency is one of the 140 state legislative assembly constituencies in Kerala, India. It is one of the seven assembly segments that constitute the Idukki Lok Sabha constituency. Since 2021, it has been represented by Mathew Kuzhalnadan of the Indian National Congress.

== Local self-governed segments ==
Muvattupuzha Assembly constituency is composed of the following local self-governed segments:

Sl no.	Name	Status (Grama panchayat/Municipality)	Taluk
1	Muvattupuzha	Municipality	Muvattupuzha
2	Arakuzha	Grama panchayat	Muvattupuzha
3	Avoly	Grama panchayat	Muvattupuzha
4	Ayavana	Grama panchayat	Muvattupuzha
5	Kalloorkkad	Grama panchayat	Muvattupuzha
6	Manjalloor	Grama panchayat	Muvattupuzha
7	Marady	Grama panchayat	Muvattupuzha
8	Paipra	Grama panchayat	Muvattupuzha
9	Palakkuzha	Grama panchayat	Muvattupuzha
10	Valakam	Grama panchayat	Muvattupuzha
11	Paingottoor	Grama panchayat	Kothamangalam
12	Pothanikkad	Grama panchayat	Kothamangalam

== Members of Legislative Assembly ==
The following list contains all the members of the Kerala Legislative Assembly who have represented the Muvattupuzha Assembly constituency during various legislative assemblies.

Election	Niyama Sabha	Name	Party	Tenure
1957	1st	K. M. George	Indian National Congress	1957–1960
1960	2nd	K. M. George	Indian National Congress	1960–1965
1967	3rd	P. V. Abraham	Communist Party of India	1967–1970
1970	4th	Pennamma Jacob	Independent	1970–1977
1977	5th	P. C. Joseph	Kerala Congress	1977–1980
1980	6th	V. V. Joseph	Kerala Congress (Joseph)	1980–1982
1982	7th	V. V. Joseph	Kerala Congress (Joseph)	1982–1987
1987	8th	A. V. Isaac	Independent	1987–1991
1991	9th	Johnny Nellore	Kerala Congress (M)	1991–1996
1996	10th	Johnny Nellore	Kerala Congress (Jacob)	1996–2001
2001	11th	Johnny Nellore	Kerala Congress (Jacob)	2001–2006
2006	12th	Babu Paul	Communist Party of India	2006–2011
2011	13th	Joseph Vazhakkan	Indian National Congress	2011–2016
2016	14th	Eldo Abraham	Communist Party of India	2016–2021
2021	15th	Mathew Kuzhalnadan	Indian National Congress	Incumbent
2026	16th	Mathew Kuzhalnadan	Indian National Congress	Incumbent

== Election results ==
Percentage change (±%) denotes the change in the number of votes from the immediate previous election.

=== 2026 ===
There were 1,86,254 registered voters in the Muvattupuzha constituency for the 2026 Kerala Assembly election.

2026 Kerala Legislative Assembly election: Muvattupuzha
Party	Candidate	Votes	%	±%
INC	Mathew Kuzhalnadan	89,914	60.69	▲16.06
CPI	N. Arun	47,085	31.79	▼8.57
TTP	Sunny Kadoothazhe	9,840	6.64	▼2.74
NOTA	None of the above	683	0.46	▲0.16
SDPI	Babu Mathew	609	0.41	–
Margin of victory		42,829	28.90	▲24.63
Turnout		1,48,131	79.53	▲3.70
INC hold		Swing	▲16.06	

=== 2021 ===
There were 1,91,222 registered voters in the Muvattupuzha constituency for the 2021 Kerala Assembly election.

2021 Kerala Legislative Assembly election: Muvattupuzha
Party	Candidate	Votes	%	±%
INC	Mathew Kuzhalnadan	74,425	44.63	▲1.93
CPI	Eldo Abraham	68,264	40.36	▼8.91
Twenty20 Party	Adv. C. N. Prakash	13,535	9.38	–
BJP	Jiji Joseph	7,527	5.21	▼1.63
NOTA	None of the above	427	0.30	▼0.15
SUCI	C. K. Thampi	176	0.12	–
Margin of victory		6,961	4.27	▼2.30
Turnout		1,45,005	75.83	▼4.32
INC gain from CPI		Swing	▲1.93	

=== 2016 ===
There were 1,77,939 registered voters in the Muvattupuzha constituency for the 2016 Kerala Assembly election.

2016 Kerala Legislative Assembly election: Muvattupuzha
Party	Candidate	Votes	%	±%
CPI	Eldo Abraham	70,269	49.27	▲3.81
INC	Joseph Vazhackan	60,894	42.70	▼7.20
BJP	P. J. Thomas	9,759	6.84	▲3.08
NOTA	None of the above	635	0.45	–
PDP	P. K. Aboobacker Thangal	512	0.36	–
SDPI	P. P. Moideenkunju	426	0.30	–
Independent	Justin T. D.	121	0.08	–
Margin of victory		9,375	6.57	▲2.13
Turnout		1,42,616	80.15	▲4.87
CPI gain from INC		Swing	▲3.81	

=== 2011 ===
There were 1,54,440 registered voters in the Muvattupuzha constituency for the 2011 Kerala Assembly election.

2011 Kerala Legislative Assembly election: Muvattupuzha
Party	Candidate	Votes	%	±%
INC	Joseph Vazhackan	58,012	49.90	–
CPI	Babu Paul	52,849	45.46	▼5.07
BJP	Jiji Joseph	4,367	3.76	▲1.02
Independent	Biju Sreedharan	546	0.47	–
BSP	Boby Kaloor	487	0.42	–
Margin of victory		5,163	4.44	▼9.38
Turnout		1,16,261	75.28	▲8.61
INC gain from CPI		Swing		

=== 2006 ===
There were 1,43,555 registered voters in the Muvattupuzha constituency for the 2006 Kerala Assembly election.

2006 Kerala Legislative Assembly election: Muvattupuzha
Party	Candidate	Votes	%	±%
CPI	Babu Paul	48,338	50.53	▲7.58
DIC	Adv. Johnny Nellore	35,113	36.70	–
Independent	P. C. Cyriac	5,407	5.65	–
Independent	Johny	3,062	2.20	–
BJP	P. R. Vijayakumar	2,625	2.74	▼0.49
Independent	Thomas Kallan	384	0.40	–
Independent	Tom Jose	306	0.32	–
Independent	Yokacharya Neelan Kallara	215	0.23	–
Independent	Shiju Kuriakose	220	0.22	–
Margin of victory		13,225	13.82	▲5.36
Turnout		95,706	66.67	▼3.82
CPI gain from KC(J)		Swing	▲7.58	

=== 2001 ===
There were 1,49,151 registered voters in Muvattupuzha constituency for the 2001 Kerala Assembly election.

2001 Kerala Legislative Assembly election: Muvattupuzha
Party	Candidate	Votes	%	±%
KC(J)	Johnny Nellore	54,031	51.41	▲1.82
CPI	George Kunnappilly	45,138	42.95	–
BJP	P. C. Muraleedharan	3,395	3.23	▲0.11
Independent	Adv. Tom Jose	2,542	2.42	–
Margin of victory		8,893	8.46	▼1.64
Turnout		1,05,131	70.49	▼1.32
KC(J) hold		Swing	▲1.82	

=== 1996 ===
There were 1,42,720 registered voters in the Muvattupuzha constituency for the 1996 Kerala Assembly election.

1996 Kerala Legislative Assembly election: Muvattupuzha
Party	Candidate	Votes	%	±%
KC(J)	Johnny Nellore	47,841	49.59	–
Independent	P. M. Thomas	38,145	38.54	–
Independent	Alias Eradikunnel	4,602	4.77	–
BJP	M. N. Gangadharan	3,014	3.12	▼0.02
Independent	C. M. Musthafa	761	0.79	–
Independent	Cherian Varughese	618	0.64	–
Independent	John Abraham	262	0.27	–
Independent	A. M. Thomas	239	0.25	–
Independent	Paulosekutty Vargese	195	0.20	–
Independent	Thomas Ulahannan	184	0.19	–
Independent	Joy Kurian	172	0.18	–
Independent	Jayan Kunjunellan	152	0.16	–
Independent	Kuruvilla Joseph	150	0.16	–
Independent	John Joseph	138	0.14	–
Margin of victory		9,696	10.10	▲6.48
Turnout		1,02,044	71.50	▼5.27
KC(J) gain from KC(M)		Swing		

=== 1991 ===
There were 1,37,723 registered voters in the Muvattupuzha constituency for the 1991 Kerala Assembly election.

1991 Kerala Legislative Assembly election: Muvattupuzha
Party	Candidate	Votes	%	±%
KC(M)	Johnny Nellore	51,783	49.59	–
Independent	A. V. Issac	48,004	45.97	▼1.32
BJP	T. S. Ravindranath	3,278	3.14	▼1.05
Independent	Chhittoor Soman	377	0.36	–
Independent	C. V. Issac	364	0.35	–
UCPI	P. V. Ayyappan Nair Issac	262	0.25	–
Independent	Issac	242	0.23	–
Independent	George Varkey	59	0.06	–
Independent	Ramankutty Thanikkunnel	54	0.05	–
Margin of victory		3,779	3.62	▼0.10
Turnout		1,05,728	76.77	▼6.15
KC(M) gain from Independent		Swing		

=== 1987 ===
There were 1,12,650 registered voters in the Muvattupuzha constituency for the 1987 Kerala Assembly election.

1987 Kerala Legislative Assembly election: Muvattupuzha
Party	Candidate	Votes	%	±%
Independent	A. V. Issac	43,970	47.29	▲0.62
KEC	V. V. Joseph	40,514	43.57	–
BJP	Ajith	3,395	4.19	–
Independent	James Manuel Kuruvithadam	2,468	2.65	–
Independent	C. P. Mathai	912	0.98	–
Independent	Ravi N. Kombanal	440	0.47	–
Independent	V. V. Joseph	255	0.27	–
Independent	P. S. Ayyappan Nair	121	0.13	–
Independent	M. K. Damodaran	79	0.08	–
Independent	Scariah Varkey	68	0.07	–
Independent	Bhakaran Itty	66	0.07	–
Independent	M. S. Sangameswaran	53	0.06	–
Independent	M. P. Issac	49	0.05	–
Independent	Abraham George	41	0.04	–
Independent	K. S. Akhileswaran	29	0.03	–
Independent	K. A. Varkey	23	0.02	–
Margin of victory		3,456	3.72	▼0.56
Turnout		93,413	82.92	▲6.90
Independent gain from KC(J)		Swing	▲0.62	

=== 1982 ===
There were 94,613 registered voters in the Muvattupuzha constituency for the 1982 Kerala Assembly election. (Note: KCJ was an abbreviation used for Kerala Congress (Joseph), standing for Kerala Congress (I). In election result tables, the standardised abbreviation KC(J) is used, as defined in Wikipedia’s political party data modules.)

1982 Kerala Legislative Assembly election: Muvattupuzha
Party	Candidate	Votes	%	±%
KC(J)	Joseph Varkey	36,389	50.95	▼0.68
Independent	Issac Varkey	33,332	46.67	–
Independent	Govindan Kala	1,359	1.90	–
Independent	Kunjan Kannan	349	0.47	–
Margin of victory		3,057	4.28	▼0.63
Turnout		71,921	76.02	▼0.75
KC(J) hold		Swing	▼0.68	

=== 1980 ===
There were 93,794 registered voters in the Muvattupuzha constituency for the 1980 Kerala Assembly election.

1980 Kerala Legislative Assembly election: Muvattupuzha
Party	Candidate	Votes	%	±%
KC(J)	V. Joseph	37,044	51.63	–
KEC	Johny Nelloor Varkey (Johny Nelloor)	33,523	46.72	▼2.53
Independent	Chacko Kuriakose	532	0.74	–
Independent	Bhakseran Itty	481	0.67	–
Independent	George Ulahamnan	94	0.13	–
Independent	C. P. Mathai	75	0.10	–
Margin of victory		3,521	4.91	▼2.02
Turnout		72,010	76.77	▼6.96
KC(J) gain from KEC		Swing		

=== 1977 ===
There were 81,742 registered voters in the Muvattupuzha constituency for the 1977 Kerala Assembly election. (Note: KCP was an earlier abbreviation used for Kerala Congress (B), standing for Kerala Congress (Pillai Group). In election result tables, the standardised abbreviation KC(B) is used, as defined in Wikipedia’s political party data modules.)

1977 Kerala Legislative Assembly election: Muvattupuzha
Party	Candidate	Votes	%	±%
KEC	P. C. Joseph	32,994	49.25	–
KC(B)	Sunny Mannathukaran	28,349	42.32	–
Independent	Pennamma Jacob	2,249	3.36	▼33.39
Independent	E. I. Narayanan	1,950	2.91	–
Independent	M. P. Abraham	1,450	2.16	–
Margin of victory		4,645	6.93	▲3.09
Turnout		68,435	83.73	▲8.22
KEC gain from Independent		Swing		

=== 1970 ===
There were 73,786 registered voters in the Muvattupuzha constituency for the 1970 Kerala Assembly election.

1970 Kerala Legislative Assembly election: Muvattupuzha
Party	Candidate	Votes	%	±%
Independent	Pennamma Jacob	20,651	37.35	–
CPI	P. V. Abraham	18,527	33.51	▼9.37
INC(O)	K. C. Paily	14,717	26.62	–
Independent	C. P. Mathai	715	1.29	▲0.25
Independent	P. K. Sreedharan	680	1.23	–
Margin of victory		2,124	3.84	▼8.08
Turnout		55,716	75.51	▼4.75
Independent gain from CPI		Swing		

=== 1967 ===
There were 63,954 registered voters in the Muvattupuzha constituency for the 1967 Kerala Assembly election.

1967 Kerala Legislative Assembly election: Muvattupuzha
Party	Candidate	Votes	%	±%
CPI	P. V. Abraham	21,333	42.88	▲20.50
INC	K. C. Paily	15,400	30.95	▲1.87
KEC	A. T. Pathrose	12,507	25.14	▼12.41
Independent	C. P. Mathai	516	1.04	–
Margin of victory		5,933	11.92	▲3.45
Turnout		51,328	80.26	▲1.01
CPI gain from KEC		Swing	▲20.50	

=== 1965 ===
There were 64,478 registered voters in the Muvattupuzha constituency for the 1965 Kerala Assembly election. (Note: Since no single party could form a ministry commanding a majority in the legislature, the election is regarded as abortive.)

1965 Kerala Legislative Assembly election: Muvattupuzha
Party	Candidate	Votes	%	±%
KEC	A. T. Pathrose	18,929	37.55	–
INC	E. P. Poulose	14,659	29.08	▼32.51
CPI	N. Parameswaran Nair	11,281	22.38	–
SSP	K. V. Paul	5,546	11.00	–
Margin of victory		4,270	8.47	▼14.07
Turnout		51,100	79.25	▲8.22
KEC gain from INC		Swing		

=== 1960 ===
There were 60,612 registered voters in the Muvattupuzha constituency for the 1960 Kerala Assembly election.

1960 Kerala Legislative Assembly election: Muvattupuzha
Party	Candidate	Votes	%	±%
INC	K. M. George	33,520	61.59	▲11.87
Independent	K. C. Abraham	20,907	38.41	–
Margin of victory		12,613	23.17	▲17.77
Turnout		55,017	90.77	▲25.33
INC hold		Swing	▲11.87	

=== 1957 ===
There were 51,699 registered voters in the Muvattupuzha constituency for the 1957 Kerala Assembly election.

1957 Kerala Legislative Assembly election: Muvattupuzha
Party	Candidate	Votes	%	±%
INC	K. M. George	16,820	49.72	
CPI	Kuruvilla Mattai (Mathew)	14,993	44.32	
SSP	Bhakaran Nair G.	2,019	5.97	
Margin of victory		1,827	5.40	
Turnout		33,832	65.44	
INC win (new seat)				

== See also ==
- Muvattupuzha
- Ernakulam district
- List of constituencies of the Kerala Legislative Assembly
- 2016 Kerala Legislative Assembly election
