= Avoly =

Pancayath located in Ernakulam district, Kerala

- Village
- Location in Kerala, India Avoly (India)
- Coordinates: 9°57′31″N 76°37′22″E
- Country: India
- State: Kerala
- District: Ernakulam
- Established: 1953

Government
  - Type: Panchayath
  - Body: Avoly Grama Panchayath
- Time zone: UTC+5:30 (IST)
- PIN: 686670
- Telephone code: 0485
- Vehicle registration: KL-17
- Nearest city: Muvattupuzha
- Lok Sabha constituency: Idukki

Avoly is a panchayath located in Ernakulam district of the Indian state of Kerala. The panchayath is a part of Muvattupuzha taluk and consists of 14 wards which include Anikkad, Kavana, Kizhakkekara, Kottapuram, Nadukkara, and Pareeka Peedika.

Avoly comes under the Muvattupuzha Assembly constituency which is coming under Idukki parliamentary constituency. A major educational institution in Kerala, Nirmala College situated at Avoly panchayath.

== History ==
Avoly panchayath was formed in 1953. The first meeting of the Panchayat was held on August 15, 1953, and K. V. Emmanuel Karuppamadam became the first president. It has an area of 18.6 km^{2} and shares the borders with Ayavana Panchayath and Muvattupuzha Municipality in the North, Manjalloor panchayath and Manakkad Panchayath in the South, Manjallor panchayath and Ayavana panchayath in the East and Arakuzha panchayath and Muvattupuzha Municipality in the West.

== Demographics ==
In 2001 Avoly had a population of 15760 with 7935 males and 7825 females with a literacy rate of 93.9%. The town is mainly made up of Syrian Catholic Christians, Hindus and Muslims.

== Wards ==
1. Kizhakkekkara
2. Randar
3. Kottappuram
4. Thiruvumplavu Kshetram
5. St.sebastian.h.s
6. Pareekkapeedika
7. Kavana
8. Kavana Gov. LPS
9. Nadukkara
10. Panchayath Office
11. Anicadu
12. P.h.c
13. Companippady
14. Nirmala College, Muvattupuzha

== Economy ==
Rubber, pineapple, and coconut are the main cultivation of this village.

== Places in and around Avoly ==
- Vazhakulam
- Ayavana
- Muvattupuzha
- Mullappuzhachal

== See also ==
- Muvattupuzha taluk
- Vazhakulam
- Vazhakulam pineapple
