= Mullappuzhachal =

Village in Kerala, India

- Village
- Location in Kerala, India Mullappuzhachal (India)
- Coordinates: 9°57′48″N 76°38′37″E
- Country: India
- State: Kerala
- District: Ernakulam

Government
  - Type: Panchayath
  - Body: Ayavana Grama Panchayath

Languages
  - Official: Malayalam, English
- Time zone: UTC+5:30 (IST)
- PIN: 686670
- Telephone code: 0485
- Vehicle registration: KL-17
- Nearest city: Vazhakulam
- Lok Sabha constituency: Idukki

Mullappuzhachal is a village located in the Ernakulam district of the Indian state of Kerala. It's a part of Ayavana Grama Panchayat and Muvattupuzha taluk. Mullappuzhachal comes under the Muvattupuzha assembly constituency which is coming under Idukki parliamentary constituency.

== Places in and around Mullappuzhachal ==
Consist of the following:

- Kalloorkad
- Avoly
- Bethlehem
- Vazhakulam
- Ayavana

== See also ==
- Muvattupuzha taluk
- Vazhakulam
- Vazhakulam pineapple
