= Eldo (disambiguation) =

Eldo may refer to:

- Eldo (given name)
- European Launcher Development Organization (ELDO) predecessor to ESA (European Space Agency)
- Eldo, former name of the Neapolitan basketball club now called S.S. Basket Napoli
- The Eldo Centre, Eldoret Town, Kenya; a shopping mall, see List of shopping malls in Kenya

== See also ==
- Eldos
