= Muvattupuzha taluk =

Taluka in Kerala, India

Muvattupuzha taluk Moovattupuzha
- Village
- Country: India
- State: Kerala
- District: Ernakulam

Languages
  - Official: Malayalam, English
- Time zone: UTC+5:30 (IST)
- PIN: 686xxx
- Telephone code: 0485
- Vehicle registration: KL 17
- Nearest city: Kochi
- Lok Sabha constituency: Idukki, Kottayam
- Vidhan Sabha constituency: Muvattupuzha, Piravom

Muvattupuzha is a taluk in the Ernakulam district in the state of Kerala, India. This taluk was formed during the period of Marthanda Varma. It is a revenue division for ease of administration purposes, and is headquartered in Muvattupuzha. Most government offices are in the Mini Civil Station at Vazhappilly. Muvattupuzha taluk consists of

- Muvattupuzha municipality
- Piravom municipality
- Koothattukulam municipality

and the following panchayaths.

- Avoly
- Arakuzha
- Paipra
- Kalloorkad
- Ayavana
- Manjalloor
- Marady
- Valakom
- Maneed
- Elanji
- Thirumarady
- Palakkuzha
- Pampakuda
- Ramamangalam

Muvattupuzha taluka consists of highland and midland regions including large rubber plantations and pineapple fields. It has a predominantly agrarian economy. The population of Muvattupuzha taluk according to 2001 Census of India is 324,644. It borders with Kothamangalam taluk on the North, Thodupuzha taluk of Idukki District on the East, Vaikom and Meenachil taluks of Kottayam District on the South and Kunnathunad taluk on the West.

The main towns in Muvattupuzha taluk are:

- Muvattupuzha
- Piravom
- Koothattukulam
- Vazhakulam
- Pezhakkappilly
- Elanji
