= Pennamma Jacob =

Indian politician

Member of Kerala Legislative Assembly
- In office 1970–1977
- Preceded by: P. V. Abraham
- Succeeded by: P. C. Joseph
- Constituency: Muvattupuzha Assembly constituency

Personal details
- Born: 10 February 1927
- Died: 8 October 1998 (aged 71)
- Spouse: P. T. Jacob
- Relations: T. M. Jacob (son in law), Anoop Jacob (grand son)

Pennamma Jacob (10 February 1927 – 8 October 1998) was an Indian politician who served as a Member of Kerala Legislative Assembly from Muvattupuzha Assembly constituency from 1970 to 1977. She was an independent candidate.

== Personal life ==
She was born on 10 February 1927 as fifth child of her parents. She married P. T. Jacob who was a school teacher when she was 17. She was the mother-in-law of T. M. Jacob and grand mother of Anoop Jacob. On 8 October 1998, she died.
