= Nirmala College, Muvattupuzha =

College in Kerala, India

- നിർമല കോളേജ്
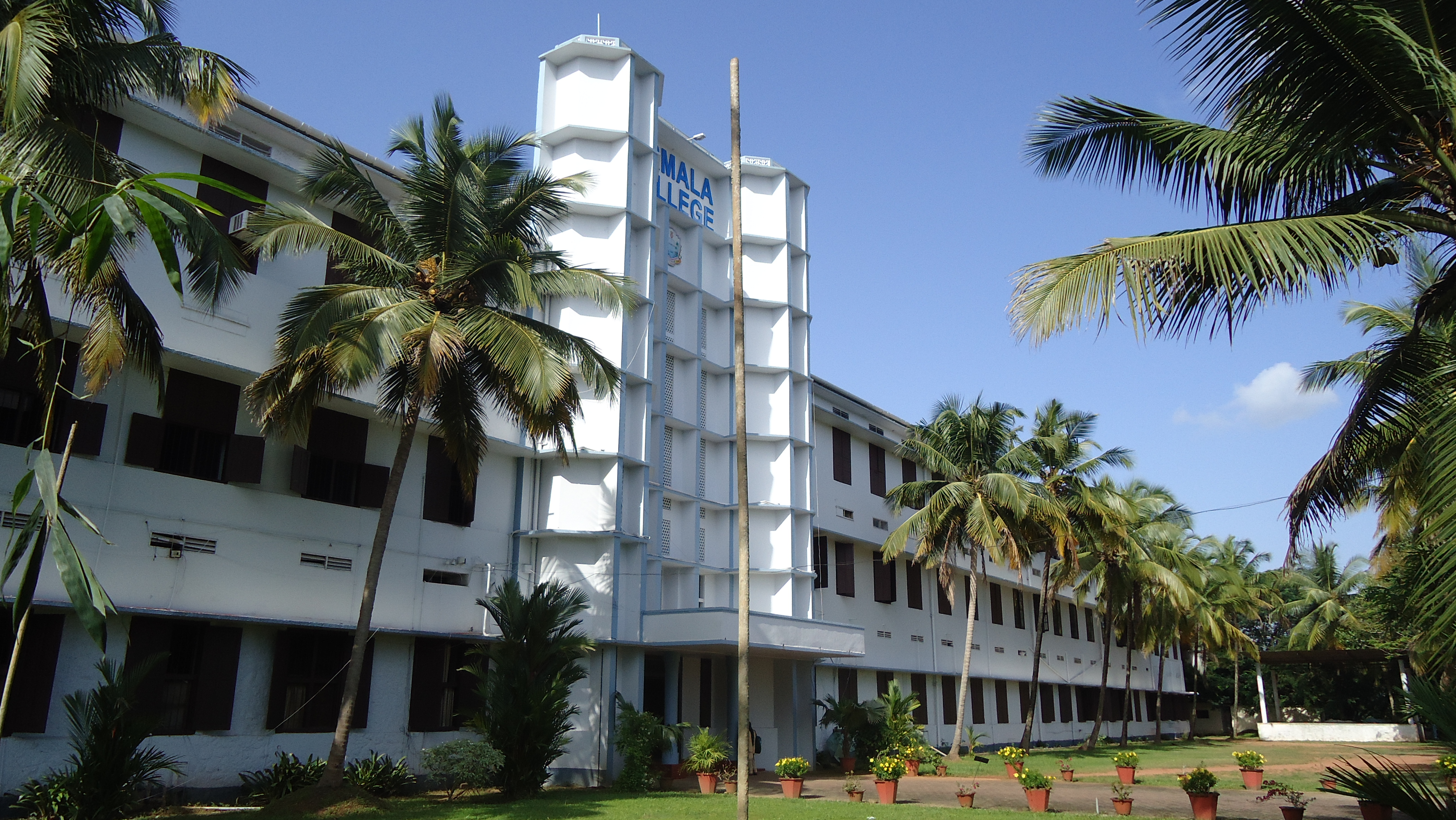
- Nirmala College, Muvattupuzha, Kerala
- Motto in English: Fear of God is the beginning of wisdom.
- Established: 1953; 73 years ago
- Religious affiliation: Syro-Malabar Catholic Diocese of Kothamangalam
- Academic affiliations: Mahatma Gandhi University
- Principal: Rev. Dr. Jestin K. Kuriakose
- Location: Muvattupuzha, Kerala, India; 9°58′38.14″N 76°35′46.81″E
- Campus: Suburban
- Website: www.nirmalacollege.ac.in

Nirmala College is a first grade arts and science college in Muvattupuzha, Kerala, India run by the Syro-Malabar Catholic Church. The college admits undergraduates and post-graduates and offers degrees in the liberal arts, sciences and commerce. The college celebrated the golden jubilee in the academic year 2002–2003. The institution is affiliated to the Mahatma Gandhi University, Kottayam. The college was Re accredited by NAAC With A++ (CGPA:3.73)Grade in April 2021.Nirmala College is governed by a management board consisting of 21 members. The Board meets at least four times a year and takes all important decisions concerning the governance of the college.

== History ==
The college is run by the Syro-Malabar Catholic Diocese of Kothamangalam. It is situated in Avoly Panchayat of Muvattupuzha Taluk in the district of Ernakulam. The college is located on the Punalur-Muvattupuzha State Highway (SH-08), just 2 km drive from Muvattupuzha town. It was founded in 1953 to meet the educational needs of the Eastern parts of North Travancore, especially of the Syrian Catholic Community, at a time, when higher education was the wildest dream of the ordinary people living in the villages and the suburbs. Msgr. Thomas Nedumkallel was the founding principal and chief architect of Nirmala College, Muvattupuzha. In 1955, the college was raised to First Grade by starting B.A., B.Sc. and B.Com. courses. Post-graduate courses were introduced in 1965 and research facilities are now available in many departments.

Thus over the years, the college has grown in size and stature. It offers 15 bachelor's degree courses, 11 master's degree courses and has five research centers (Chemistry, Commerce, Malayalam, Hindi and Statistics). Now Nirmala is one of the foremost colleges in Kerala with 2071 students and 123 faculty members. The college is affiliated with Mahatma Gandhi University, Kottayam and is nationally accredited by National Assessment and Accreditation Council With A++ grade and with a CGPA of 3.73 in 2021.

=== Other facilities ===
- Auditorium
- Garden
- Football & Cricket ground
- Movie Theatre
- AV Recording Studio
- AV Edit Suite
- Amenities centre
- Chapel
- Canteen
- Central Computing Facility
- Placement Cell
- ATM-South Indian Bank
- Central Library
- Digital Library

== Academics ==
The college offers courses at undergraduate and postgraduate levels. The Arts/Humanities stream includes English, Economics, History, Malayalam and Sociology. Science courses include Physics, Chemistry, Botany, Zoology and Computer Science. Commerce is also a stream at Nirmala College.

The college is located on a Hill (50 acre) campus in the heart of the Muvattupuzha. Its tree-lined pathways, academic buildings, steepled Gothic chapel and playgrounds make for a Landmark. The Golden Jubilee Memorial Central Library is situated on the main campus, spanning four floors with a total area of 1,517.04 sq.m. Additionally, an extension of the Central Library operates within the MCA block. Nirmala College Library provides students with a wide range of resources, including books, journals, magazines, and internet access on various subjects.

The library also houses hardbound volumes of back issues from prominent journals and magazines. With a collection of over 75,000 volumes, the Central Library subscribes to more than 100 national and international journals and magazines.

=== Courses ===
A list of undergraduate and post graduate courses are offered in this college are given below.

==== Undergraduate ====
		Remarks if any
B.A.	Economics	
B.A.	English literature and Communication studies	
B.A.	Hindi	
B.A.	Malayalam	
B.Com.	Commerce	
B.com.	Computer Application	
B.C.A.	Computer Application	
B.Sc.	Zoology	
B.Sc.	Chemistry	
B.Sc.	Mathematics	
B.Sc.	Physics (Model1 and Model 2- Electronics	
B.Sc	Botany	
B.Voc	Logistics Management	

==== Postgraduate ====
Degree	Subject	Remarks if any
M.A.	English Literature	
M.A.	Economics	
M.A.	Hindi	
M.A.	Malayalam	
M.Com.	Commerce	
M.Sc.	Zoology	
M.Sc.	Chemistry	
M.Sc.	Mathematics	
M.Sc.	Statistics	
M.C.A.	Computer Application	

== Notable alumni ==
- K. Balakrishnan Nair, Judge
- M. P. Narayana Pillai, Cartoonist
- Vaisakhan, short story writer
- Johnny Nellore, politician
- Jeethu Joseph, film director
- Dr. George Onakkoor, writer
- Raju Nair, Journalist
- Swasika, actress, model
- Eldhose Kunnappilly, former member of Kerala Legislative Assembly

== Alumni ==
The Nirmala Alumni Association is one of the important supportive organisations in Nirmala college, aim of which is to renew contacts and strengthen cordial relations and to keep alive the noble standards of Nirmala's culture and traditions. The association gives opportunities to exchange our views at appropriate intervals. It conducts various programmes for the welfare of the students, organizes meetings to highlight issues of national and contemporary relevance and collaborates with the college for reaching out programmes.

== MCA ==
Department of Computer Science is a self-financing wing of Nirmala College. The MCA programme is of two years duration with two semesters for each year. This program with a batch strength of 60 students is approved by All India Council for Technical Education and is affiliated to M.G University, Kottayam. This course is intended to train graduates in the development and use of software for different applications. The major thrust is on giving the students a sound background in computing on business functions and mathematics relevant to computer software development.

== Controversy ==
A protest arose at the college on 25 July 2024, when three female students were prevented from conducting Friday prayers in the girls' restroom. Citing the institution's secular policy, the principal denied their request, offering alternative arrangements for students to attend the nearby mosque with excused absences. Bishop Thomas Tharayil, head of the Syro-Malabar Church's Public Affairs Committee, denounced recent events at Nirmala College as part of a concerted effort to target Christian minority institutions. The Catholic Congress, affiliated with the Syro-Malabar Church, denounced the protests as divisive and called for action against those responsible.The BJP and various organizations representing members of the Catholic Church have also expressed opposition to student protests regarding the refusal to grant permission for prayer sessions. BJP criticized the incident as "extremist elements", asserting that certain individuals were attempting to stir up trouble in educational institutions managed by Hindu and Christian communities. However on 28 July 2024, College authorities officially confirmed receiving a complaint about a group of female students utilizing a common room for Namaz prayers. They clarified that the college cannot designate a prayer room due to its secular nature. SFI State Secretary clarified that their organization was not involved in any protests occurred in College. The 'Mahallu' committee members from Muvattupuzha region, comprising muslim clerics, met the college authorities termed the incident "unfortunate"and expressed their regrets.
