= Valakom =

Valakom may refer to

- Valakom, Kollam, a village in the Kollam district, Kerala, India
- Valakam, Ernakulam, a village in the Ernakuam district, Kerala, India
