= Yuhanon Meletius =

Malankara Orthodox Syrian Church bishop (born 1954)

- Church: Malankara Orthodox Syrian Church
- Diocese: Thrissur Diocese
- In office: 1990 – Present

Orders
- Ordination: 23 December 1990 by Patriarch Ignatius Zakka I

Personal details
- Born: 4 July 1954 (age 72) Elakkaranadu, Ernakulam, Kerala

Yuhanon Meletius is the metropolitan bishop of the Malankara Orthodox Syrian Church's Thrissur Diocese in India. Following the death of Baselios Marthoma Paulose II in 2021, Meletius was one of the seven members of an administrative council that governed the Malankara Orthodox Syrian Church (MOSC).

== Early life and education ==
Yuhanon Meletius was born to Markose and Saramma Murimakkil at Ezhakkaranadu. He attended primary school at Maneed before attending St. Peter's College in Kolenchery, graduating with a degree on Malayalam. He later attended United Theological College in Bangalore for a MTh and Lutheran School of Theology at Chicago for PhD studies. He also studied Syriac at St Aphrem’s Seminary in Damascus.

== Ministry ==
Meletius was ordained a deacon in 1973 by Paulose Phelexinos and ordained a priest by Baselios Paulose II, the then-Catholicos of a united Jacobite Syrian Orthodox Church and Malankara Orthodox Syrian Church. He was consecrated as a bishop in Damascus by H.H Mor Ignatius Zakka I Iwas on 23 December 1990 for the Jacobite Syrian Orthodox Church.

On 18 January 2019, clashes erupted between Jacobite and Malanakara Orthodox Christians in front of St. Mary's Church in Puthur, Thrissur, injuring several. Among those injured was Meletius, who was hospitalized. Meletius was also among those listed as accused in police cases against the clashing parties. In total, 70 Jacobite and 30 Orthodox were taken into custody. Meletius claimed that members of the Jacobite faction had tried to enter the church for their religious functions, which he claimed was prohibited by a court order. T. V. Anupama, the district collector, attempted mediation following the clashes and instructed both the Jacobite and Orthodox factions to vacate the church's surroundings, while Meletius accused the local police chief of instigating the Jacobite attempt to enter the church. Meletius was present as Baselios Marthoma Paulose II, the Malankara Catholicos of the East, refused mediation from other Christian denominations in resolving the row in December 2019, which the MOSC declared an internal matter.

Meletius was among those who approved the budgetary needs of the MOSC; in 2020, he was among the functionaries who approved a ₹790 crore annual budget for the church. Following the July 2021 death of Baselios Marthoma Paulose II, Meletius was on the seven-person administrative council that governed the Malankara Orthodox Syrian Church until Baselios Marthoma Mathews III was enthroned in October that year.

Following the 2021 announcement of the title of director Nadirshah's upcoming film Easho (Malayalam for "Jesus"), Meletius dissented against outrage over the film, saying "Does God require our protection?" in a Facebook post. The statement supporting the film's name was clarified to be his personal position rather than that of the church. He later lamented those who were "whipped up" against the film who "did not do anything" when Jesuit and tribal activist Stan Swamy died in custody.

Meletius has been a critic of "Chrisanghis," Christian sympathizers with the rhetoric of the anti-minority Sangh Parivar and Hindutva. In May 2022, he said "Christians are moving on a suicidal path. I don’t think the Sangh parivar can take the Christians on that easily in Kerala. But I have no doubt that Kerala will also see what we now see in north India." He has encouraged an interfaith closing of ranks akin to that seen during the COVID-19 pandemic in order to combat "extremism". The comments came soon after Stan Swamy died in custody in the Elgar Parishad-Maoist case; Meletius has stated that he believes Swamy was "killed". Meletius has also been a critic of P. C. George, a Poonjar politician who in 2022 Meletius called "opportunistic" and opposed to what Meletius called a majority of Christians who were "peace-loving" and "committed to the core values of India like democracy, freedom." George responded by accusing Meletius of working for the Pinarayi government.
