= Nirmala College =

Nirmala College may refer to:

- Nirmala College, Muvattupuzha
- Nirmala College, Ranchi
