= Anicad (disambiguation) =

Anicad, Anikkad or Anicadu may refer to:

- Anicad, a village in Kottayam district, Kerala
- Anikkad, a village in Ernakulam district, Kerala
- Anicadu, a village in Pathanamthitta district, Kerala
