= Eldo =

Eldo is a given name is a variation of Eldho and may refer to the following people:

== People ==
- Eldo Abraham (born 1975), Indian politician
- Eldo T. Ridgway (1880–1955), American physician and politician

== Fictional characters ==
- Eldo Davip, a fictional soldier from the novel Star Wars: The New Jedi Order: Enemy Lines: Rebel Dream
- Grandpa Eldo, a fictional character from the children's book series Elmer the Patchwork Elephant

== See also ==
- Yeldos
- Eldho
