= Anikkad (Muvattupuzha) =

Anikkad Anicadu
- village
- Location in Kerala, India Anikkad (India)
- Coordinates: 9.9688507°N 76.6098302°E
- Country: India
- State: Kerala
- District: Ernakulam

Population (2011)
  - Total: 2,245

Languages
  - Official: Malayalam, English
- Time zone: UTC+5:30 (IST)
- PIN: 686670
- Telephone code: 0485
- Vehicle registration: KL-17, KL-7
- Nearest city: Muvattupuzha, Kochi,
- Lok Sabha constituency: Idukki
- Climate: Tropical monsoon (Köppen)
- Avg. summer temperature: 32.5 °C (90.5 °F)
- Avg. winter temperature: 20 °C (68 °F)

Anikkad is a village in Ernakulam district in the state of Kerala, India. It is located near the Muvattupuzha town in Avoly Panchayat.

== Location ==
Anicadu is situated in Muvattupuzha taluk of Kerala State, in Main Eastern Highway in between Muvattupuzha - Vazhakulam 4 km from Muvattupuzha, 4 km to Vazhakulam and 12 km to Thodupuzha. The economy of Anicadu is reliant on agriculture, and the main cultivations are rubber and Pineapple.

== Nearby towns ==
The nearby main towns are Muvattupuzha, Thodupuzha, Kothamangalam, Koothattukulam. There are many small suburban towns close to Anicadu like Vazhakulam, Kalloorkkad, Pothanicad, etc.

Neighbouring cities & towns

== Transportation ==
KL-17 is the RTO code for Muvattupuzha, including Anicadu Village. Muvattupuzha KSRTC depot is located on MC Road towards south of the Muvattupuzha town just 4 km (2.5 mi) from Anicadu. The nearest major railway stations are Thrippunithura, which is 35 km (22 mi) away, Aluva, which is 40 km (25 mi) away, Ernakulam South, which is 45 km (28 mi) away, and Ernakulam North, which is 45 km (28 mi) away. The Cochin International Airport at Nedumbassery is 35 km (22 mi) from Anicadu.

- SH 8, Main Eastern Highway (Muvattupuzha - Punalur) is passing through Anicadu.
- 4 km away from State Highway 1 (Kerala) - MC Road
- 6 km away from NH 85 (previously NH 49) Kochi-Dhanushkodi passing through Munnar.

== Demographics ==
As of 2001 India census, Anikkad had a population of 2,245 with 1,081 males and 1,164 females.

== Government ==
The place falls under Muvattupuzha Assembly constituency, which is part of Idukki (Lok Sabha constituency). It was part of Muvattupuzha (Lok Sabha constituency) until 2004.
