= Eldho =

Eldho is common first (given) male name of St Thomas Christians in the South Indian state of Kerala. Variations of the name are Eldo / Yeldho / Eldhos / Eldhose; Yeldos or Eldos (in Kazakhstan). The name is of Aramaic origin and means "Birth of the Christ". The persons given the name of Eldho / Yeldho are normally baptized in Mar Thoma Cheria Pally (St Thomas Church) at Kothamangalam, Kerala India.

The person is named Eldho/Yeldho in honour of the Saint Baselios Yeldo.

Notable people with Eldho name and derivatives:

- Baselios Yeldo (1593–1685), Saint of the Syriac Orthodox Church
- Eldo Abraham (born 1975), Indian Politician
- Eldhose Alias (born 1983), Indian composer, singer and lyricist
- Eldhose Kunnappilly, Indian Politician
- Eldhose Paul (born 1996), Indian athlete
- Eldo T. Ridgway (1880–1955), American Physician and Politician

== See also ==
- Yeldos
- Eldo
