= Thrissur Diocese =

Diocese of Thrissur may refer to:

- Thrissur Orthodox Diocese, a diocese of the Malankara Orthodox Syrian Church, headquartered in Mannuthy, Kerala, India
- Syro-Malabar Catholic Archdiocese of Thrissur, a diocese of the Syro-Malabar Catholic Church in the Thrissur District of Central Kerala, India
