= Vaisakhan =

India writer (born 1940)

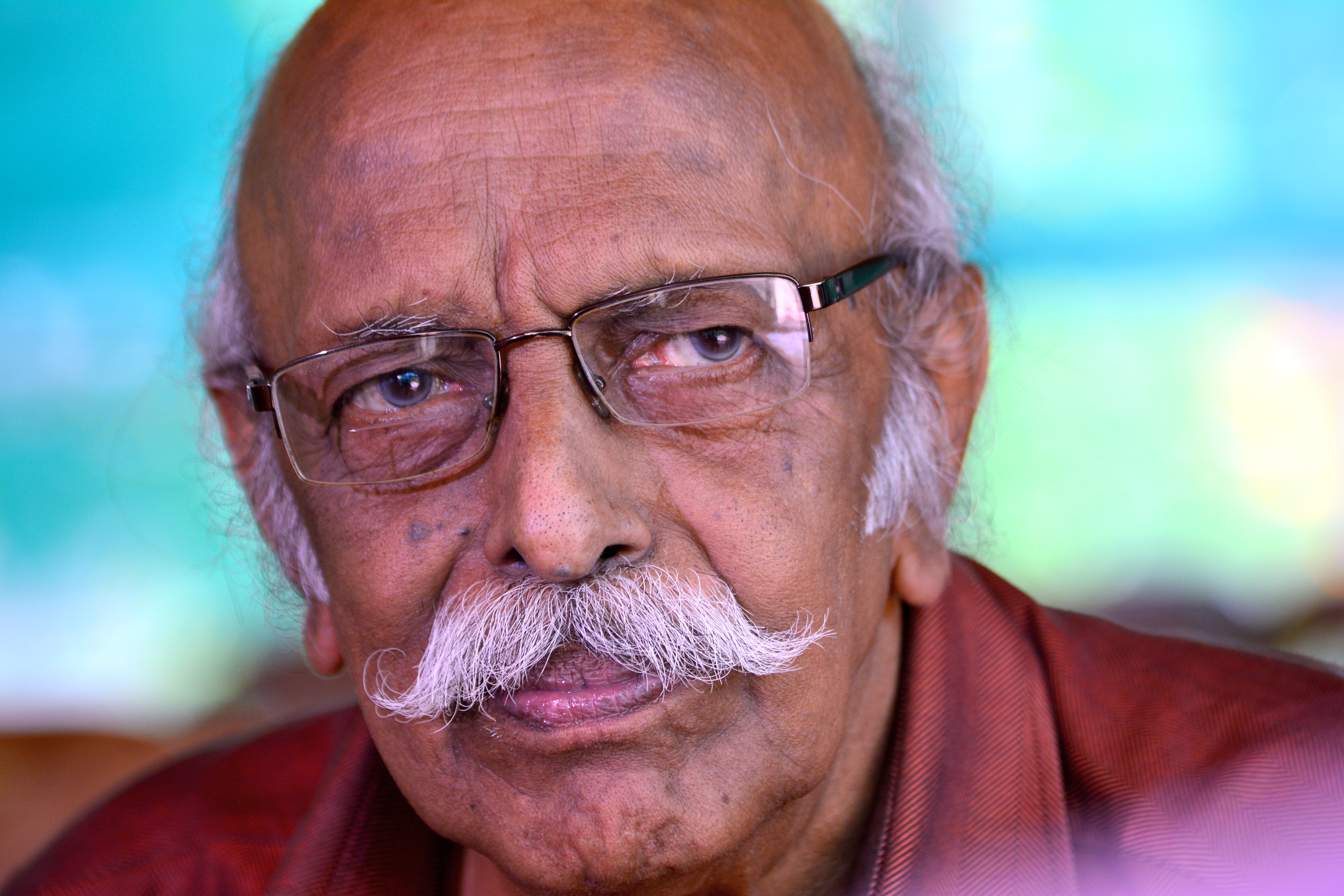
- Born: M.K. Gopinathan Nair; 27 June 1940 (age 86); Muvattupuzha, India
- Education: Maharaja's College, Ernakulam; Nirmala College; St. Albert's College
- Writing career
- Language: Malayalam
- Genres: Short stories, screenplays

M.K. Gopinathan Nair, popularly known as Vaisakhan, is an Indian short story writer, playwright, and screenwriter. Until 2022, he was the President of Kerala Sahitya Akademi. Recently he has been unanimously elected as the Chairman of Tirur Thunchan Smaraka Trust replacing the late M.T.Vasudevan Nair, who had been Chairman for 32 years. His stories are known for their simplicity in style and freshness in theme. Many feature the Indian Railways as their backdrop.

== Early life, education and career ==
Vaisakhan was born in 1940 as Gopinathan to A.V. Krishna Kurup and Narayani Amma in Muvattupuzha. He received his education at Maharaja's College, Ernakulam, Nirmala College, and St. Albert's College.

In 1964, he was appointed in the Southern Railway (India) as the station master. After 20 years of service, Vaisakhan took alvoluntary retirement to pursue a full-time career in writing.

Vaisakhan was married to Padma, who died in 1998. They have three children - Praveen, Pradeep, and Poornima. He currently lives in Raghavapuram, near Chittur, Palakkad.

Vaisakhan's most notable work is Noolpalam Kadakkunnavar, a story that has won multiple awards and critical acclaim. His other published books include:

=== Short story collection ===
- Appeal Anyayabhagam (അപ്പീൽ അന്യായഭാഗം)
- Athirukalillathe (അതിരുകളില്ലാതെ)
- Akalathil Vasantham (അകാലത്തിൽ വസന്തം )
- Bommidippoondiyile Palam (ബൊമ്മിഡിപുണ്ടിയിലെ പാലം)
- Yamakam (യമകം)
- Kathakal (കഥകൾ)
- Priyappetta Kathakal (പ്രിയപ്പെട്ട കഥകൾ)
- Silencer (സൈലൻസർ)

=== Children's literature ===
- Meen Kaykkunna Maram (മീന്‍ കായ്ക്കുന്ന മരം)
- Kathakalude Albhuthalokam (കഥകളുടെ അത്ഭുതലോകം)

=== Memoirs ===
- Vaisakhante Jeevithachinthakal (വൈശാഖന്റെ ജീവിതചിന്തകൾ)
- Oru Manassinte Rasathanthram (ഒരു മനസ്സിന്റെ രസതന്ത്രം)
- Ormayude Choottuvettam (ഒര്‍മ്മയുടെ ചൂട്ടുവെട്ടം)
- Ormayude Palangalil Pathinanju Sthreekal (ഒര്‍മ്മയുടെ പാളങ്ങളിൽ പതിനഞ്ചു സ്ത്രീകൾ)

== Major awards ==
- 1989: Kerala Sahitya Akademi Award for Story – Noolpalam Kadakkunnavar
- 1992: Cherukad Award – Noolpalam Kadakkunnavar
- 1993: Abu Dhabi Shakthi Award
- 2010: M.C. Joseph Award
- 2010: Kamala Surayya Award – Silencer (Short story collection)
- 2013: Ayanam - C.V. Sreeraman Katha Puraskaram
- 2017: Prof. Joseph Mundasserry Award
- 2021: Kerala Sahitya Akademi Fellowship

== Positions held ==
- Chairman, Tirur Thunchan Smaraka Trust (Feb 2025 - present)
- President, Kerala Sahitya Akademi (August 2016 – 2022)
- President, Purogamana Kala Sahitya Sangham (2013–2018)
- Member, Thunchan Smaraka Samithi ( - 2025)
- Former Chairman, Kunchan Nambiar Smarakam - Killikurissimangalam
- Former Advisor, Sahitya Akademi
- Former Administration team member, Kerala Sahitya Akademi

== See also ==
- List of Indian writers
