= M. P. Narayana Pillai =

Indian writer

- Born: 22 November 1939; Ernakulam, Kerala, India
- Died: 19 May 1998 (aged 58); Mumbai, Maharashtra, India
- Occupations: Novelist, Short story writer
- Spouse: Prabha
- Children: Balakrishna Pillai; Madhavankutty Pillai
- Parent(s): Thazhathu Parameshwaran Nair; Ammukutty Amma
- Awards: 1991 Kerala Sahitya Akademi Award

Malikathazhathu Pulluvazhy Narayana Pillai (22 November 1939 – 19 May 1998), affectionately known as Nanappan among his friends, was a journalist and writer of Malayalam literature. Known for his novel, Parinamam (The Evolution), and a number of short stories including Murugan Enna Pambatty (Murugan, the Snake Charmer) and George Aaramante Kodathi (The Court of George VI), Pillai was associated with Far Eastern Economic Review and McGraw-Hill World News. He was awarded the Kerala Sahitya Akademi Award for Novel in 1991, but he declined the award.

== Biography ==
M. P. Narayana Pillai was born on 22 November 1939 to Thazhathu Parameshwaran Nair and Malikathazhathu Ammukutty Amma in Pulluvazhy, a village near Perumbavoor in Ernakulam district of the south Indian state of Kerala. After early schooling at the local school in Pulluvazhy, he completed his Pre-University course at Nirmala College, Muvattupuzha and moved to Banaras Hindu University from where he obtained his BSc degree in agricultural science. Subsequently, he started his career as a telephone operator at the consulate of East Germany in Delhi. Later, he joined Central Planning Commission, Delhi as an economic investigator and worked there for five years. In 1967, he moved to Hong Kong to join the Far Eastern Economic Review as the assistant editor but stayed there only for 3 years and returned to India to take up the position of the chief of publications with Mumbai-based Commerce Group in 1970. He was also associated with McGraw-Hill World News as their Indian correspondent, with periodicals such as Minerals and Metals Review and Trial, a Malayalam weekly of Kalakaumudi and served as he chief executive officer of Asian Industries Information Center. Another of his journalistic attempts was the funding of Gulf Malayalee, a periodical for the Malayali expatriates residing in the Gulf region.

Pillai was married to Prabha Pillai, an editor of the Economic and Political Weekly who would later publish two books named as Verpadinte Vedanakal and Ormakalude Mahanagarathil, based on her memories of Narayan Pillai. The couple had two sons, Balakrishna Pillai and Madhavankutty Pillai, and the family lived Borivli, in Mumbai. It was here Pillai died on 19 May 1998, at the age of 58.

== Writing career ==
Narayana Pillai is considered by many as one of the finest writers of Malayalam fiction. It was reported that he started writing during his stay in Delhi where he met Kakkanadan and was influenced by the writer; the first story was Kallan (The Thief). Murugan Enna Pambatti, George Aramante Kodathi, Yathrakkidayil and Njangal Asuranmar are some of his most notable short stories. Most of his short stories have been compiled in 5 anthologies viz. Murugan Enna Pambatti, 56 Sathragali, Anthikoottu, Njangal Asuranmar and M. P. Narayana Pilayude Kathakal. He wrote only one novel, Parinamam, which was selected for the Kerala Sahitya Akademi Award for Novel in 1991. However, he declined the award, requesting the government to deposit the prize money in the state treasury. He could not complete his second novel, Hanuman Seva, which was later completed by Punathil Kunjabdulla. His memoirs is titled, Avasanathe Pathuroopanottu. Samakalika Malayalam Varika, a sister publication of The New Indian Express, have instituted an annual award, M. P. Narayana Pillai Memorial Short Story Award, in his honour, which carries a prize money of ₹ 50,000 and a citation.

== Selected works ==
=== Novels ===
- M.P Narayanapillai (1 January 2007). Parinamam. DC Books. ISBN 978-81-7130-322-9.
- M. P. Narayana Pillai, Punathil Kunjabdulla. Hanumanseva. Green Books. Archived from the original on 7 January 2017.

=== Short stories ===
- M. P. Narayana Pillai (1998). 56 Sathragali. DC Books. ASIN B007E4W2AQ.
- Pillai, M. P. Narayana (1 January 2017). M. P. Narayana Pillayude Kathakal (in Malayalam). DC Books. ASIN B06XK7C84P.
- M. P. Narayanapillai (1 May 2013). Malayalathinte Suvarnakathakal. Repro Knowledgcast Limited. ISBN 978-81-8423-237-0.
- M. P. Narayanapillai (1969). Anthikoottu. Current Books.
- Pillai, M. P. Narayana (1 January 2017). Ente Priyapetta Kathakal (in Malayalam). DC Books. ASIN B06XKH3PTP.
- Pillai, M. P. Narayana (3 September 2003). Vivadam (in Malayalam). DC Books.
- M. P. Narayana Pillai. George Aaramante Kodathi. Haritham Books. ISBN 9788192826257.
- M. P. Narayana Pillai, Haritham Books. Murukan Enna Pambatti. ISBN 9788192826202.
- M. P., Narayana Pillai (1977). Jnangal Asuranmar (in Malayalam). National Book Stall.
- M.P, Narayana Pillai (1998). Urulaykku Upperi (in Malayalam). Monsoon Books.
- M.P, Narayana Pillai (2002). Innale Kakka Vanno? Pindam Kothiyo (in Malayalam). D.C. Books.
- M.P, Narayana Pillai (2002). Aram Kannu (in Malayalam). D.C. Books.
- Narayana Pillai, M. P. (2002). Madya puraanam / (in Malayalam). D.C. Books.
- Narayana Pillai, M. P. (2002). Pidakkozhi koovaan thudangiyal / (in Malayalam). D.C. Books.
- Narayana Pillai, M. P. (2002). Velipaadukal / (in Malayalam). D.C. Books.
- M.P, Narayana Pillai (2002). Venkayayugam (in Malayalam). D.C. Books.

=== Essays and memoirs ===
- M. P. Narayana Pillai (2011). Marunottam : Thiranjedutha Lekhanangal. Kottayam: DC Books. ISBN 9788126431250. OCLC 762380254.
- M. P. Narayanapillai (1 January 2014). Avasanathe Pathuroopanottu (Memoirs). Repro Knowledgcast Limited. ISBN 978-81-8423-291-2.
- Pillai, M. P. Narayana (1 January 2017). Kentucky Chicken Kadakal Thallipolikkanamo? (in Malayalam). DC Books. ASIN B06XKGZGR7.
- M. P. Narayana Pillai (2002). Jathi Chodikkuka Parayuka. DC Books. Archived from the original on 30 January 2019.
- M. P. Narayana Pillai. Aarkkanu Bhranth?. Mathrubhumi Books. Archived from the original on 10 May 2021.
- M. P., Narayana Pillai (1998). Munnam Kannu (in Malayalam). DC Books. ISBN 81-7130-833-3.
- Narayanapillai, M. P. (1998). Kazhchakal sabdhangal. Thrissur: Current Books.
- M.P, Narayana Pillai (2002). Vayanakkare Poovittu Thozhanam (in Malayalam). D.C. Books.
