= Johnny Nellore =

Indian politician (born 1951)

Johnny Nelloor

Member of Kerala Legislative Assembly
- In office 1991–2006
- Preceded by: A. V. Issac
- Succeeded by: Babu Paul
- Constituency: Muvattupuzha

Personal details
- Born: 19 August 1951 (age 74) Arakuzha, Kerala, India
- Party: Kerala Congress (M) (2024–present)
- Other political affiliations: National Progressive Party (2023–2024); Kerala Congress (2020–2023); Kerala Congress (Jacob) (1993–2005) (2006–2020); Democratic Indira Congress (Karunakaran)(2005–2006)
- Spouse: Chinnamma Johny
- Children: 2
- Occupation: Politician; lawyer

Johnny Nelloor (born 19 August 1951) is an Indian lawyer and politician from Kerala Congress (M). He represented Muvattupuzha Assembly constituency in the Kerala Legislative Assembly from 1991 to 2006.

== Career ==
Entered politics while a student; was the general secretary of K.S.C.; general secretary K.Y.F.; Ernakulam District secretary of Kerala Congress; chairman, B.D.C., Muvattupuzha; secretary of Muvattupuzha Bar Association, president of several organisations; office bearer of many trade unions; general secretary, Kerala Congress (Jacob).

Johnny Nellore was first elected to the Kerala Legislative Assembly as an MLA from Muvattupuzha constituency in 1991, and remained as a member for a period of over fifteen years, representing Muvattupuzha constituency. He was elected thrice from Muvattupuzha and lost two subsequent elections.

He was elected from Muvattupuzha in 1991, 1996, 2001 respectively. He is the only person elected from Muvattupuzha thrice in a continuous term. In 1991 he defeated A.V Issac of CPI by a margin of 3779 votes, in 1996 he defeated P. M. Thomas by a margin of 9696 votes and in 2001 against George Kunnappily by a margin of 8893 votes. In 2011 he contested from Angamaly but lost to Jose Thettayil, a former minister of Kerala.

== Personal life ==
Johnny Nelloor is married to Chinnu (Chinnamma) who is a housewife. The couple has a daughter Soumya and a son Sony Nelloor.
