= Mathew Kuzhalnadan =

Indian politician

Mathew Kuzhalnadan MLA

Member of the Kerala Legislative Assembly
- Incumbent
- Assumed office 24 May 2021
- Preceded by: Eldo Abraham
- Constituency: Muvattupuzha

Personal details
- Born: 28 May 1977 (age 49) Paingottoor, Kothamangalam, Ernakulam, Kerala, India
- Party: Indian National Congress
- Spouse: Elsa Catharine George
- Children: Arden Abraham Mathew
- Parents: Abraham; Mary
- Education: Jawaharlal Nehru University, New Delhi
- Occupation: Lawyer; Politician

Mathew Kuzhalnadan (born 28 May 1977) is an Indian lawyer and politician from Kerala and a member of the Indian National Congress. He represents Muvattupuzha constituency in the Kerala Legislative Assembly.
