= K. Balakrishnan Nair =

Kesavan Nair Balakrishnan Nair (born 12 April 1948) is a former judge of Kerala High Court, serving from 2001 to 2010. He was born on 12 April 1948 and was educated at L.P.G. School, Trikalathoor; N.S.S. U.P. School, Mannoor; St. Thomas High School, Keezhillam; Nirmala College, Muvattupuzha and Kerala Law Academy Law College, Thiruvananthapuram.

He was enrolled as an Advocate on the rolls of Bar Council of Kerala on 9 November 1975. He practised at the Civil and Criminal Courts at Muvattupuzha as junior to Late V.A. Joy. Nair shifted his practice to Ernakulam in 1978 as associate of Mr. Justice K.A. Abdul Gafoor and Late K.A. Abraham. Later, he practised as junior to late Mr. Justice V. Sivaraman Nair and late Mr. V.M. Nayanar, then Director of Public Prosecutions. In 1988 started independent practice in Civil, Criminal, Labour and Constitutional matters before the High Court of Kerala. Worked as the Standing Counsel for Kerala Agricultural University; Ernakulam and Kollam District Co-operative Banks; Kochi Corporation and Kerala Motor Transport Workers Welfare Fund Board.

He was initially appointed as an Additional Judge of the Kerala High Court on 7 September 2001 and on 27 November 2002 as a permanent judge. He demitted the office on 11 April 2010. When the Government of Kerala set up an Administrative Tribunal, he was appointed as its first Chairman and assumed office on 03.09.2010. He demitted the office of the Chairman, Kerala Administrative Tribunal, Trivandrum in 2015.

Smt. Girija Balakrishnan, a lawyer who joined the Federal Bank, is his better half. Shyam Balakrishnan and Meera Balakrishnan are their two children. He has three sisters and an elder brother. Sri. Raveendran Muvattupuzha is his half brother.
