= Eldo Abraham =

Indian politician

- എൽദോ എബ്രഹാം
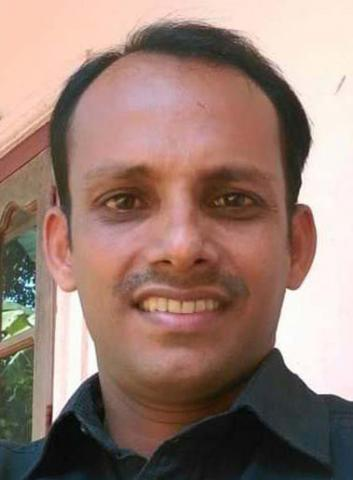
- Eldo Abraham

Member of Kerala Legislative Assembly
- In office 2 June 2016 – 24 May 2021
- Preceded by: Joseph Vazhackan
- Succeeded by: Mathew Kuzhalnadan
- Constituency: Muvattupuzha

Personal details
- Born: Eldo Abraham; 31 May 1975 (age 51)
- Party: Communist Party of India
- Spouse: Agi Mary Augustine
- Parents: M. P. Abraham (father); Aleyamma Abraham (mother)

Eldo Abraham is an Indian politician. He was the MLA from Muvattupuzha in Ernakulam district, Assembly constituency Kerala in 14th legislative assembly. He defeated Congress leader Joseph Vazhakkan in the 2016 elections to the Kerala Assembly by 9375 votes. Eldo represents the Communist Party of India (CPI).

He fractured his hand when struck by a cane in one of the protests he was a participant.

== Political career ==
- Started political life through A.I.S.F. in 1991;
- He was, University Union Councillor (1995, 1996), Executive member, M.G. University Union; Member, Students Council, M.G. University; Councillor, I.T.I. Union;
- District Secretary and State Secretariat Member, A.I.S.F.; President and Secretary, A.I.Y.F. Muvattupuzha; District President and Secretary, State Committee Member, A.I.Y.F.;
- Member of Payyipra Grama Panchayat (2005, 2010) and chairman, Ward Development Sub Committee.
- Now Member, C.P.I. District Committee; Secretary, Toddy Workers Federation, Muvattupuzha Mandalam;
- Director of Thrikkalathur Service Co-operative Bank.

Kerala Legislative Assembly Election
Year	Constituency	Closest Rival	Majority (Votes)	Won/Lost
2016	Muvattupuzha	Joseph Vazhackan (INC)	9375	Won
2021	Muvattupuzha	Dr. Mathew Kuzhalnadan (INC)	6161	Lost

== See also ==
- Eldho
