= St. Mary's Church, Marady =

St. Mary's Jacobite Syrian Church Under the Holy See of Antioch and All the East
- Classical Syriac: ܥܺܕܬܳܐ ܣܽܘ̣ܪܝܳܝܬܳܐ ܝܰܥܩܽܘܒܳܝܬܳܐ ܕܡܳܪܬܝ ܡܰܪܝܰܡ ܒܡܰܪܰܕܺܝ; Malayalam: മാറാടി വി. മർത്തമറിയം യാക്കോബായ സുറിയാനി പള്ളി
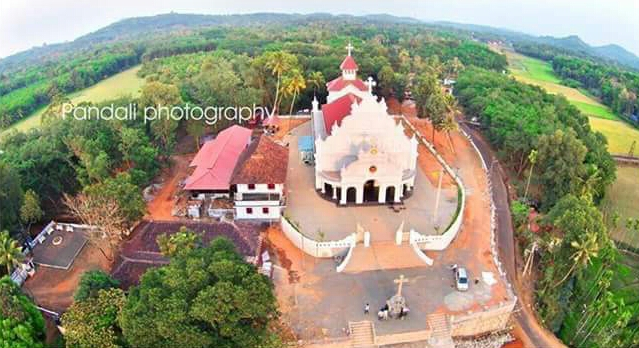
- Aerial View

- Location within Kerala Location within India
- 9.9547224°N 76.5679345°E
- Location: Muvattupuzha, Kerala
- Country: India
- Denomination: Syriac Orthodox
- Tradition: West Syriac Rite

History
- Status: Church
- Founded: 1865; 161 years ago
- Founder: Fr. Paulose Kuttipuzha
- Dedication: Virgin Mary, Mother of God

Administration
- Division: Muvattupuzha Region
- Diocese: Angamaly

Clergy
- Bishop: Gregorios Gabriel Metropolitan
- Vicar: Fr. Siju Abraham

St. Mary's Jacobite Syrian Church is a church located in Kurukkunnapuram, East Marady, Muvattupuzha, Kerala, India.

== History ==
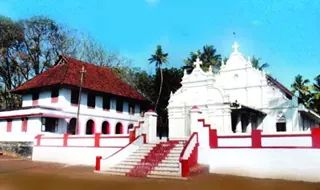
The Old Church

From the ancient times, there was a strong Christian presence in these areas. St. George's Church, Kadamattom and St. Mary's Church, Rackad were the parishes of Jacobite believers in the earliest times.

When the number of Jacobite Christians in Marady increased and they were struggling to carry on their spiritual activities in the church at a distance of miles away, the ancestors decided to build a church in Marady. The foundation stone of the church was laid on 1865 (1040 ME) at Kurukkunnapuram, a hill surrounded by paddy fields and fruit trees. Fr. Paulose Kuttipuzha led the building of the church. The construction was completed on 1867 (1042 ME) as a result of the collective activity of 70 families in Marady and nearby.

The church was established with the intention of continuing to follow the traditions of Universal Syriac Orthodox Church under the Patriarch of Antioch and All the East.

=== Reconstruction ===
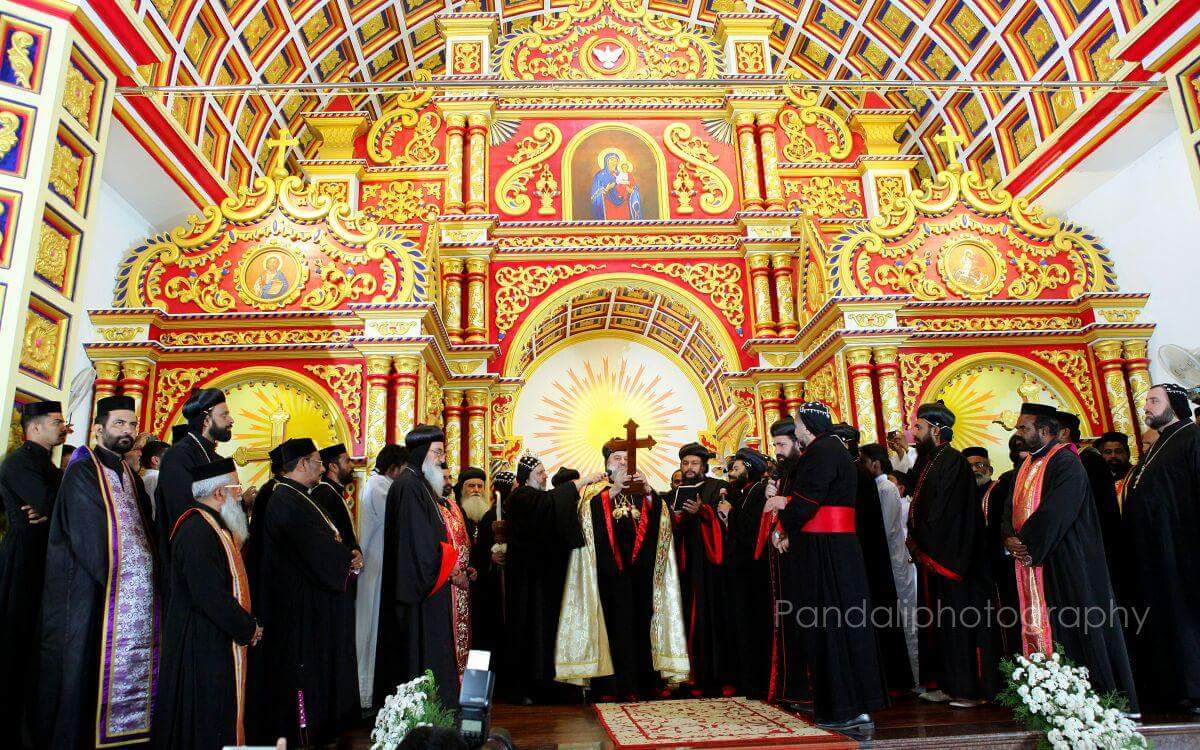
The consecration of the Church

The reconstruction of the church began on 2007 and completed on 2015. On 10 February 2015, Patriarch Ignatius Aphrem II of Antioch consecrated the church during his First Holy Apostolic Visit to India. He was assisted by Catholicos Baselios Thomas I of India, and Anthimos Matthews Metropolitan.

== Holy altars ==
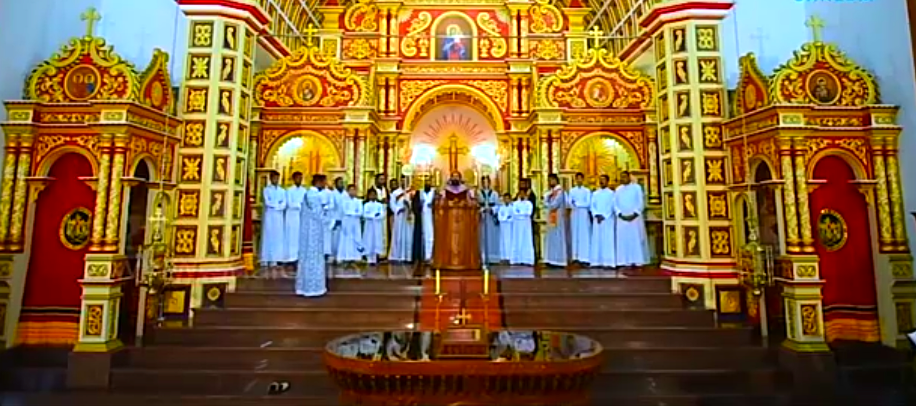
Holy Qurobo

There are five altars at the church. The main altar, the central one, is in the name of Virgin Mary, Mother of God.

There are two altars on the north and south of the main one. The altar on the northern side is consecrated to Saint Thomas the Apostle and the altar on the southern side is consecrated in the name of Saint George.

There are two smaller altars, to the front of the main altar. The north among these is in the name of Saint Constantine the Great and his mother, Saint Helena of Constantinople. The southern among the small altars is consecrated to Patriarch Saint Ignatius Elias III of Antioch.

== Holy relic ==
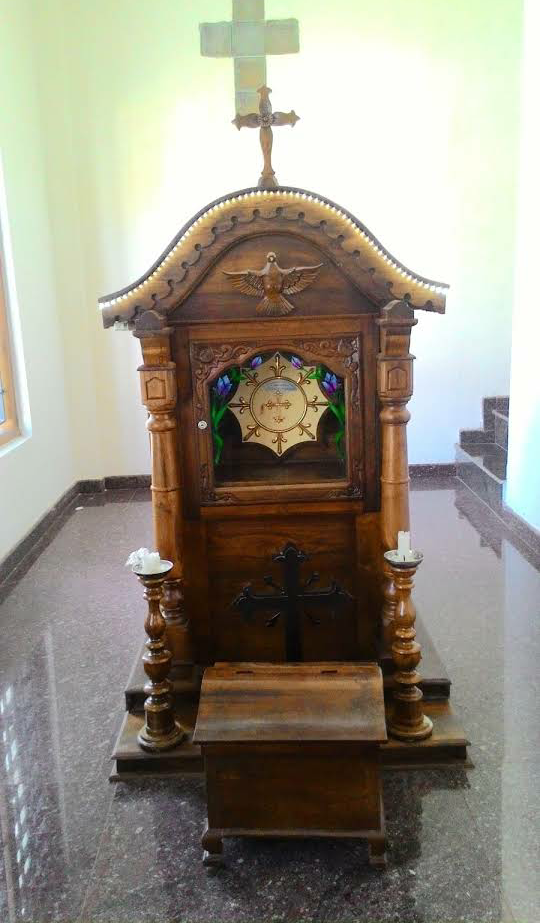
The reliquary which keeps the Holy Relic of Mor Qaumo

The Holy Relic of Saint Shemvun Qaumo Abilo (also called Mar Kauma), a 5th-century Syriac monk who meditated for 45 years in the standing position, has been installed at the church in 1928 by Saint Osthathios Sliba, the Patriarchal Delegate of the Holy See of Antioch to India.

The Holy Relic is ceremoniously taken out and exhibited for public veneration on the Saint's Feast Day (14 November) every year.

== Feasts ==
- The Feast of Ma`alto - 2 February (It is the main feast at the church)
- The Feast of Shunoyo - 15 August
- The Feast of Saint Qaumo - 14 November

== Holy Qurobo timings ==
	Morning Prayer	Holy Qurobo
Sundays	7:00 AM	8:00 AM
Feast Days	7:00 AM	8:00 AM
Other Days	7:00 AM	7:30 AM
