= Raju Nair =

Indian cartoonist

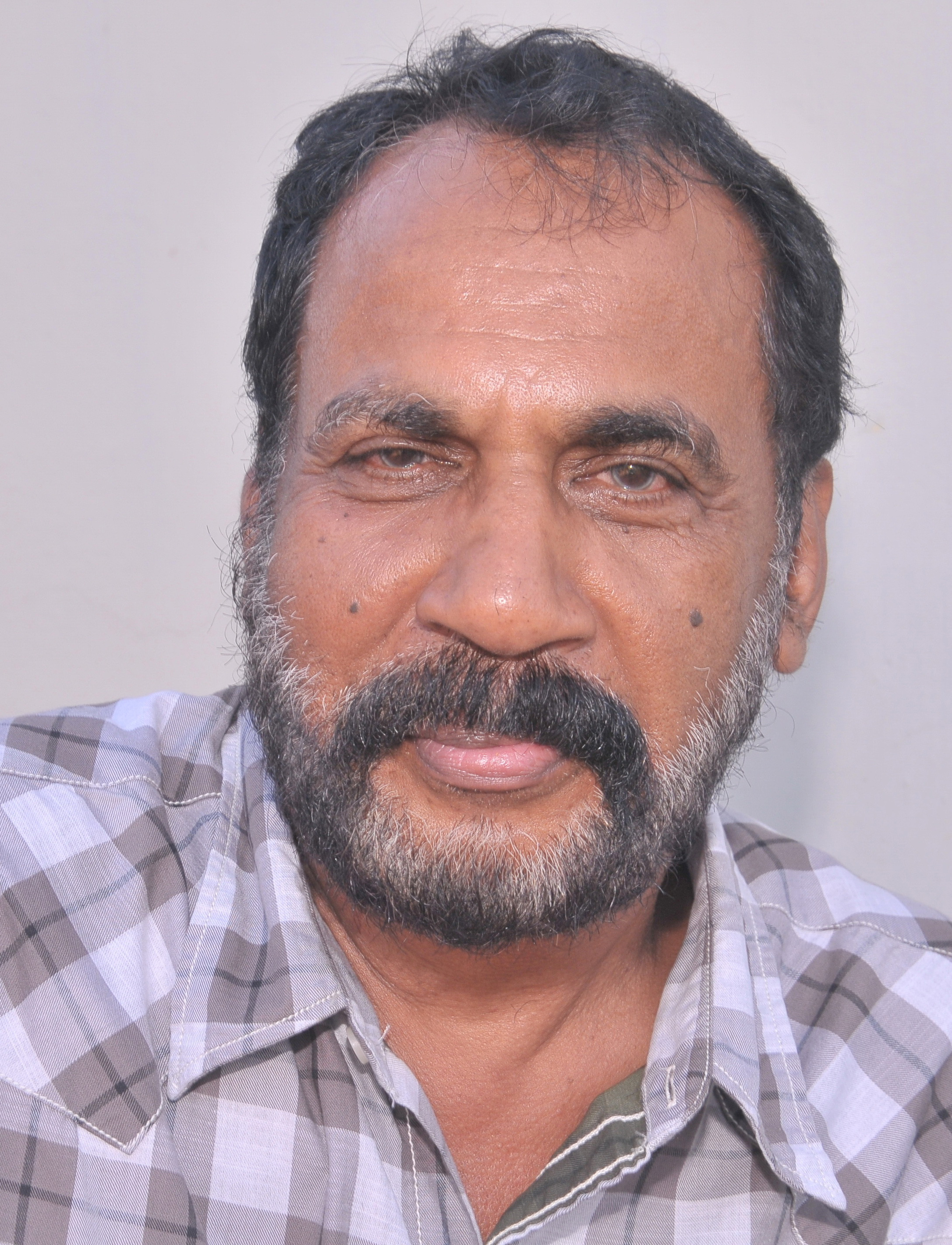
- Nair in September 2013
- Born: Raju Peter; 13 April 1952 (age 74)
- Area: Cartoonist
- Spouse: Baby C.K
- Children: 2

Raju Nair (born 13 April 1952) is an Indian newspaper cartoonist. He is one of the most prominent cartoonists in the Malayalam newspaper industry. Though his official name is Raju Peter, even his close associates do not know this or this name is seldom known. Most importantly, he is the director of first tele-film with animated cartoons to be telecasted in a channel.

Currently he is working as the senior cartoonist of Deepika, the oldest newspaper in Malayalam language. He has been in the field of cartoon and caricatures for a quite long time, well over three and a half decades.

== Birth and childhood ==
Nair was born to Peter Kocheril and Gracy Peter on 13 April 1952 at Perumbavoor in Ernakulam district of Kerala, India. He later moved to Munnar and had his Lower primary education at Munnar Government LPS and Upper Primary education at Little Flower High School, Nallathanni in Munnar.

Having completed his high school studies from Nirmala High School in Muvattupuzha, he joined Nirmala College from where he completed his Pre–Degree (an equivalent course to the current 10+2 system) and graduation in Commerce. While he was in the college and school, he had won a number of prizes for drawing and painting.

== Major achievement ==
Nair is the director of the first tele-film in Malayalam with animated cartoon pictures. It was he who directed the first tele-film with animated cartoons entitled Cherapai Kadhakal. It was telecasted on the state-owned channel Doordarshan.

== Career ==
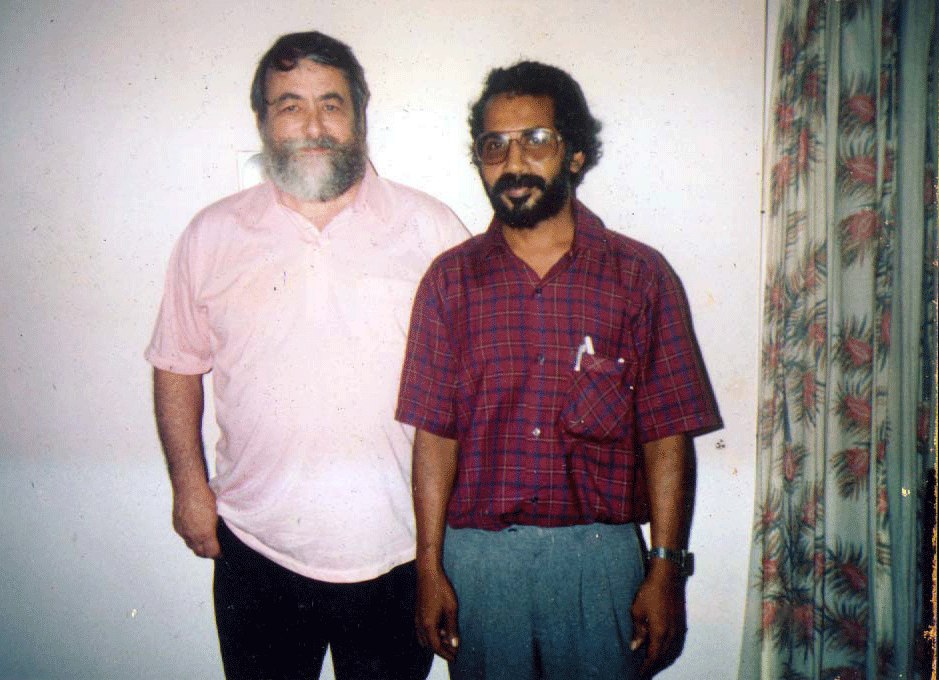
Cartoonist Raju Nair with Dr. John A Lent. The image was taken on 13-07-1993 during Dr. Lent's visit to Kerala.

With a view of kindling his talents in drawing and painting, he decided to start his career as an artist. Thus in the year 1978, he began working as an artist at the age of 26. Though in the initial phases, he preferred to remain behind the curtain and so he decided to take the profession of artist as a freelancer.

A couple of years were sufficient for Cartoonist Raju Nair to gain fame and name. His talents in drawing, particularly in cartooning or caricaturing, were widely appreciated and he got handful of offers from many art-related firms and magazines.

== Career at Deepika ==
He joined Deepika in 1980 and ever since he is a strong presence in the cartoon column of this newspaper. During his 35-year-long career at Deepika he was awarded many times by the local and state government and non-government organizations.

He has been regularly publishing cartoons under the title Cartoon Scope for 23 years in Rashtra Deepika, the evening newspaper by Rashtra Deepika Ltd. which is the same publishers of Deepika. Cartoon Scope is most probably one of the oldest and lengthiest cartoon as it has reached nearly 6000 episodes. His cartoon entitled Mavelinadu (the land of Maveli in English) is one of the most popular cartoons all over the state.

Earmarking the 125th anniversary of the Deepika, a special exhibition of Cartoons by Raju Nair was held at Thiruvananthapuram.

== Major cartoons ==
1. Mavelinadu – in Deepika
2. Madhuvidhu – published in Deepika Weekly
3. Amruthayum Mridulayum – in Kuttikalude Deepika
4. Sunday Club – in Express
5. Cartoon Scope - Rashtra Deepika

== Cartoons and columns ==
1. Captain John William – Adventures Comic Strip (1979)
2. Utkadana Manthri – Manorajyam Weekly (1998)
3. Kalyaniyum Kochammayum – Mamankom Weekly and Deepika Daily – (from 1979 to 85, 1993- ...)
4. Focus Out of Focus- Cinema Masika (1979)
5. Kochu Kochu Posukal – Mamankom Weekly (1981)
6. Moonnam Cheri – The Deepika Daily (1981)
7. Mahasar - Mamankom Weekly (1981)
8. Muka Mukam - The Deepika Weekly (1985)
9. Amminikutty – Kalakaumudi Women Magazine (1985)
10. Nattilum Veettilum – Manorajyam Weekly (1987)
11. Netaji – Deepika Daily (1989)
12. Cartoon Scope – Rashtra Deepika Evening Daily (1993-...)
13. Kiran – Yovadeepam Monthly (1992)
14. Akavum Puravum – Nadam Monthly (1993)

Apart from these, Nair has also contributed to various special editions of Deepika Annuals, Kunju Kurup, a humorous monthly from Toms Publications. He is also the founder treasurer of Cartoon Akkademi (Cartoon Academy) established in 1982 and become secretary in 1990.

== Awards ==
Nair has won many state awards. He won the Media Awards for Cartoon in 2005 from the Kerala Press Academy for his cartoon Driving School.

He was chosen the best cartoonist of the year 2003 by the Trivandrum Press Club.

== Major books ==
Nair has written a couple of books in Malayalam. They are Cartoon Jeevitham, Cartoon Kadhakal and Amruthayum Mridulayum. Two editions of Amruthayum Mridulayum have been published so far.

== Family life ==
Nair is married to Baby. She works at South Indian bank, Perumthuruthy branch as the assistant manager. They have two children: Nitin and Neethy.

== Gallery – Major Life Events ==
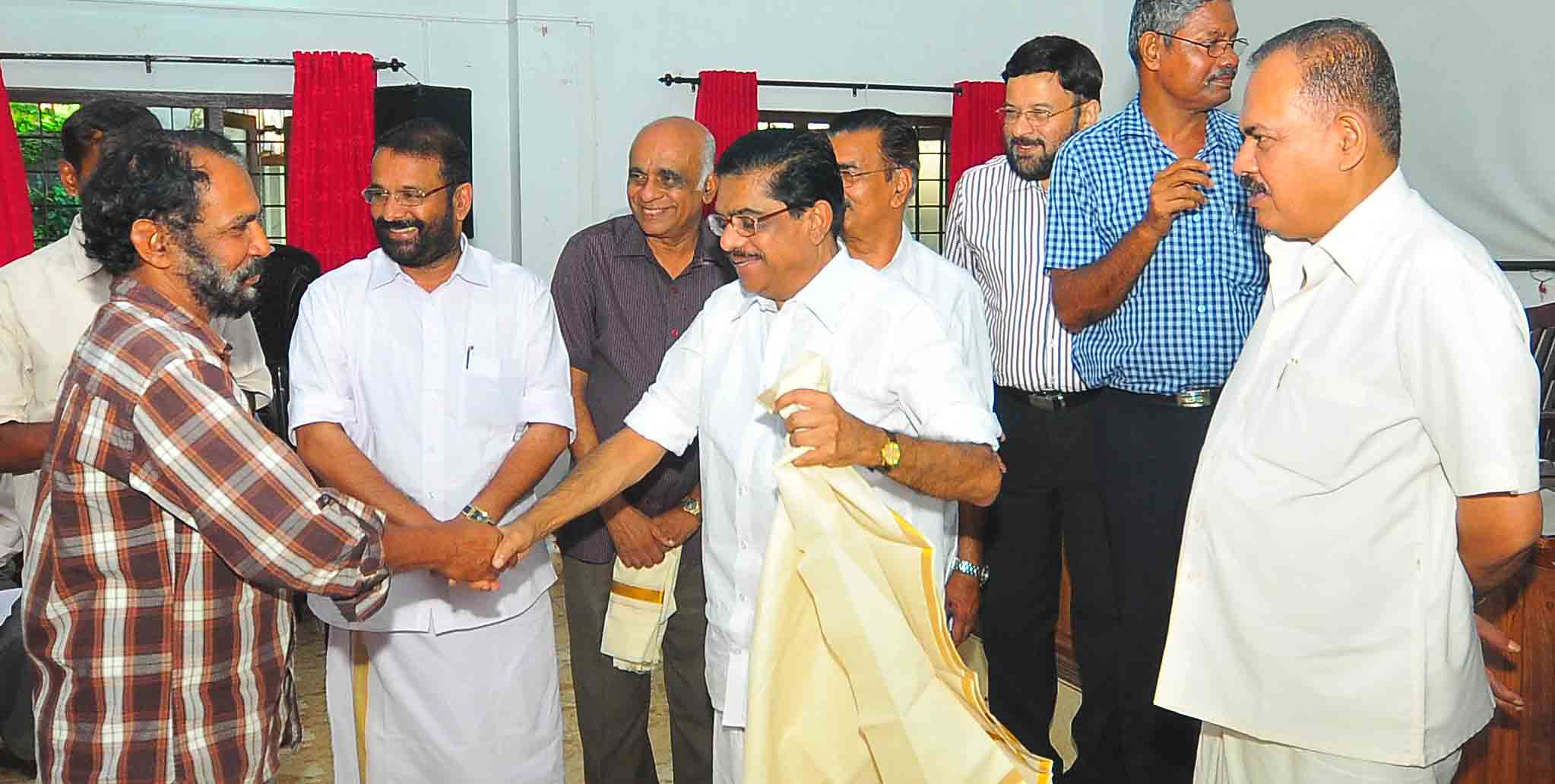
Raju Nair is felicitated by VM Sudheeran, KPCC President at a KUWJ function held at CMS College in 2013.

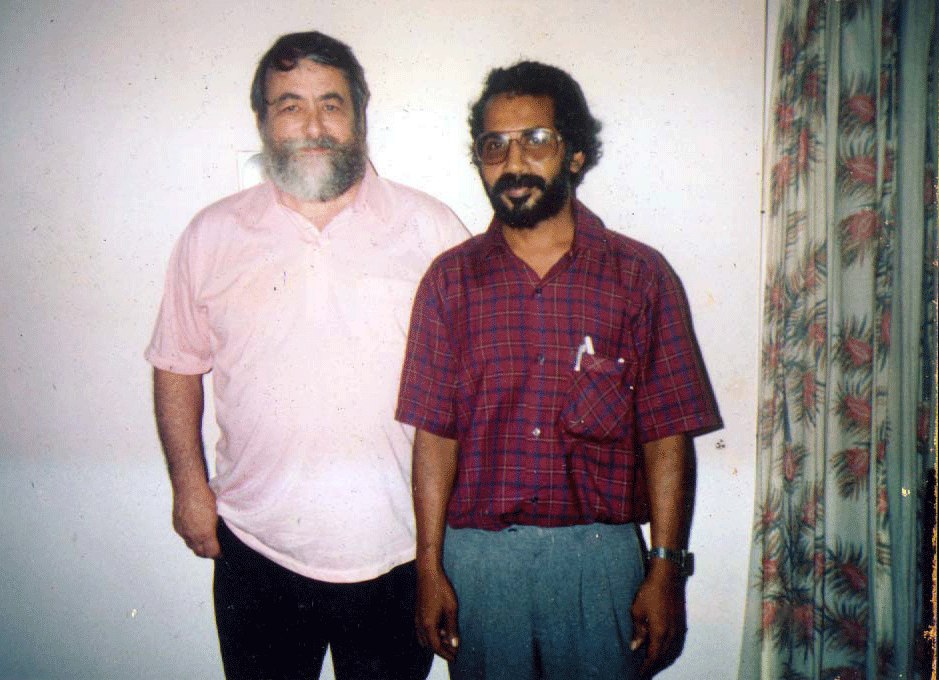
Raju Nair with Dr. John A Lent in 1993.
