= Vazhakulam =

Vazhakulam Pineapple City
- town
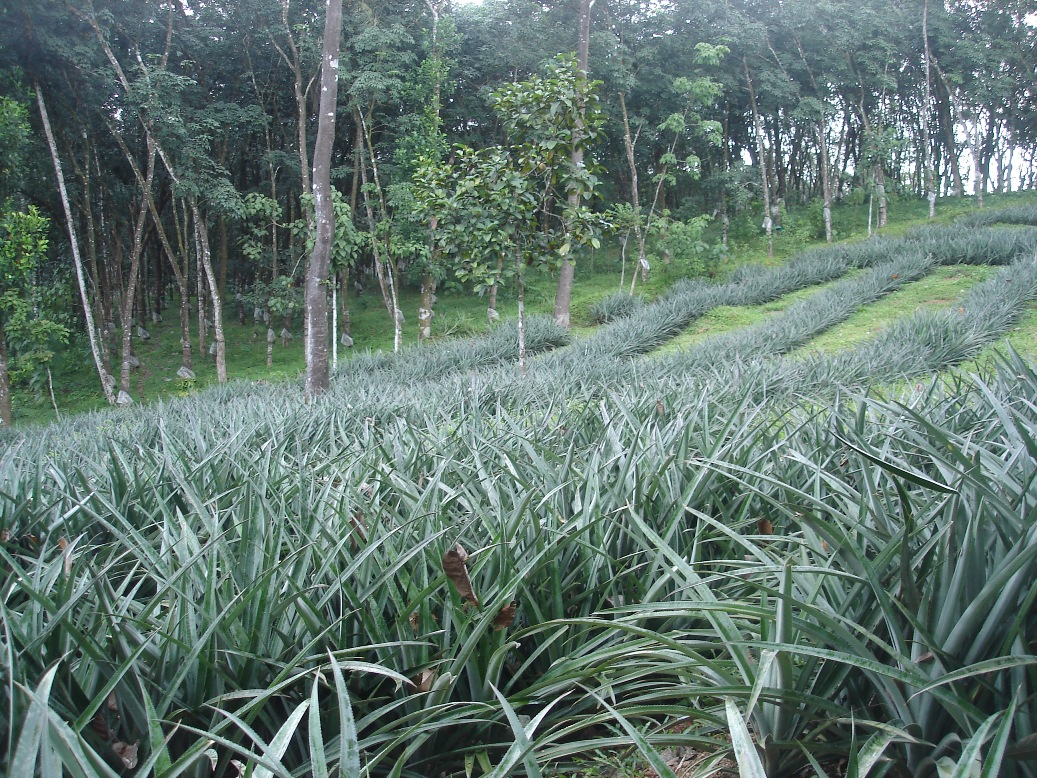
- Pineapple and Rubber cultivations in Vazhakulam

- Location in Kerala Location in India
- Coordinates: 9.94736°N 76.63545°E
- Country: India
- State: Kerala
- District: Ernakulam

Government
  - Body: Manjalloor Panchayath
- Elevation: 22 m (72 ft)

Languages
  - Official: Malayalam, English
- Time zone: UTC+5:30 (IST)
- PIN: 686670
- Telephone code: 0485
- Vehicle registration: KL-17
- Nearest city: Muvattupuzha, Thodupuzha, Kothamangalam
- Lok Sabha constituency: Idukki
- Civic agency: Manjalloor Panchayath

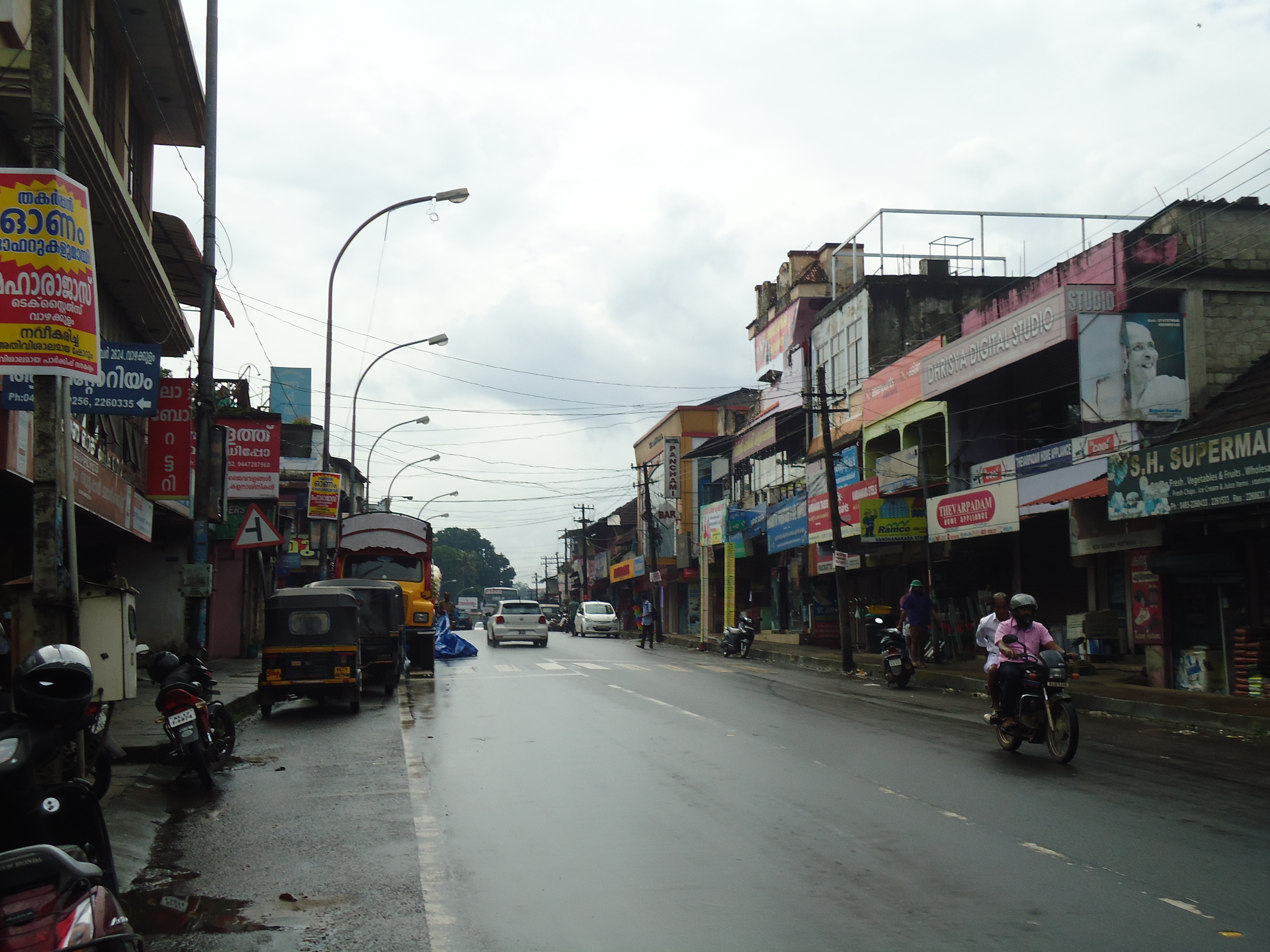
Vazhakkulam Junction

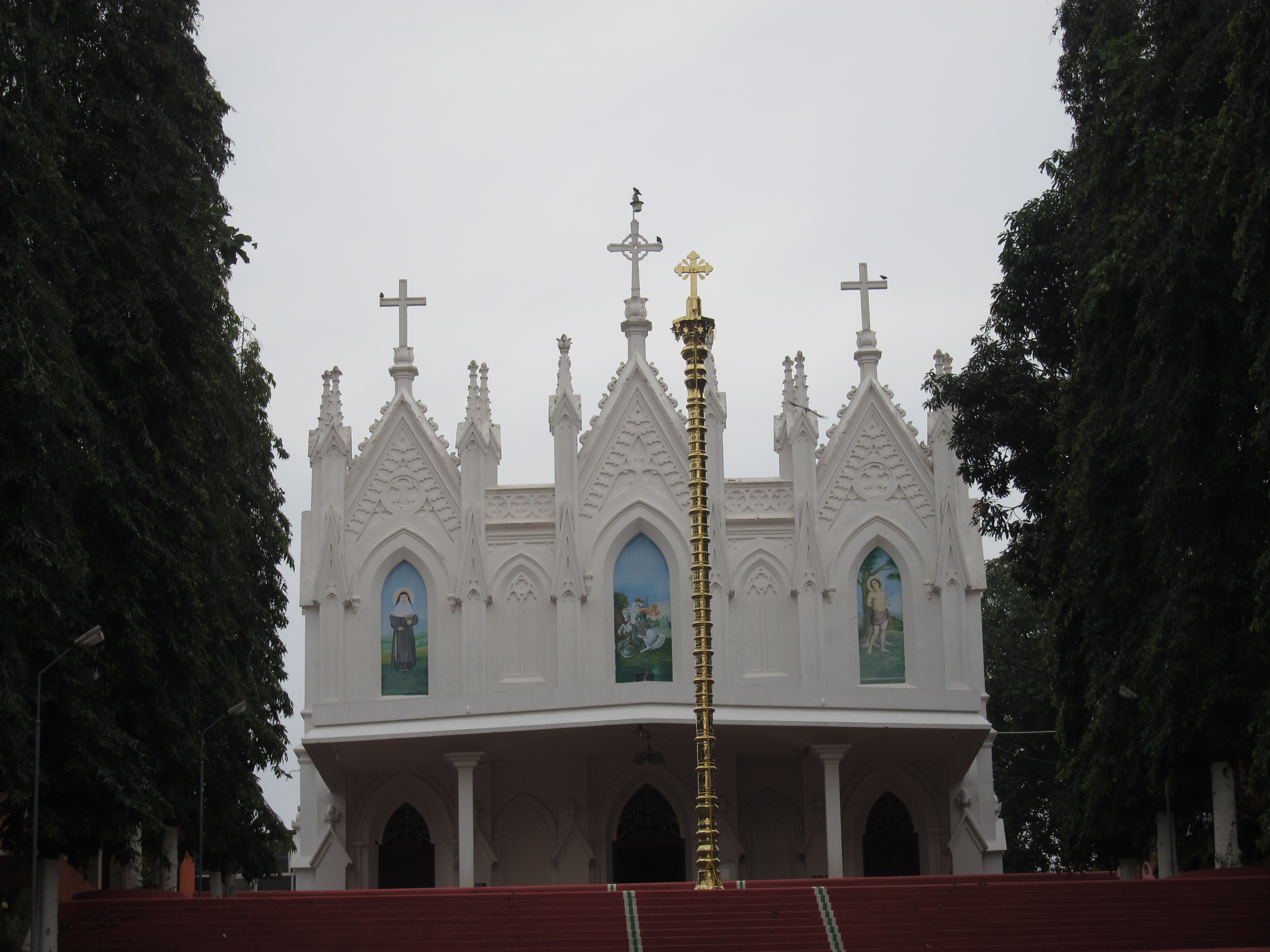
Forane Church

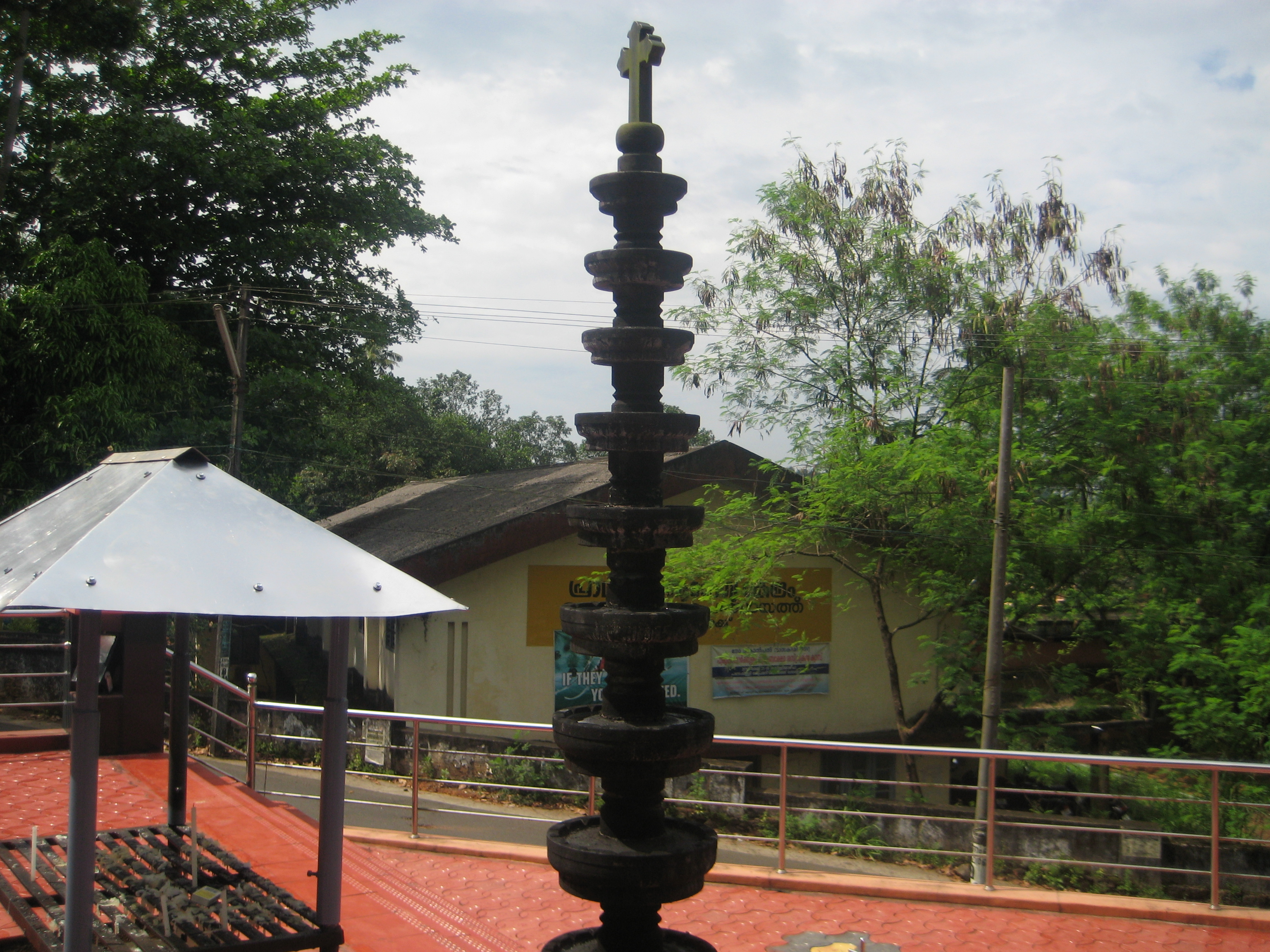
Stone lamp

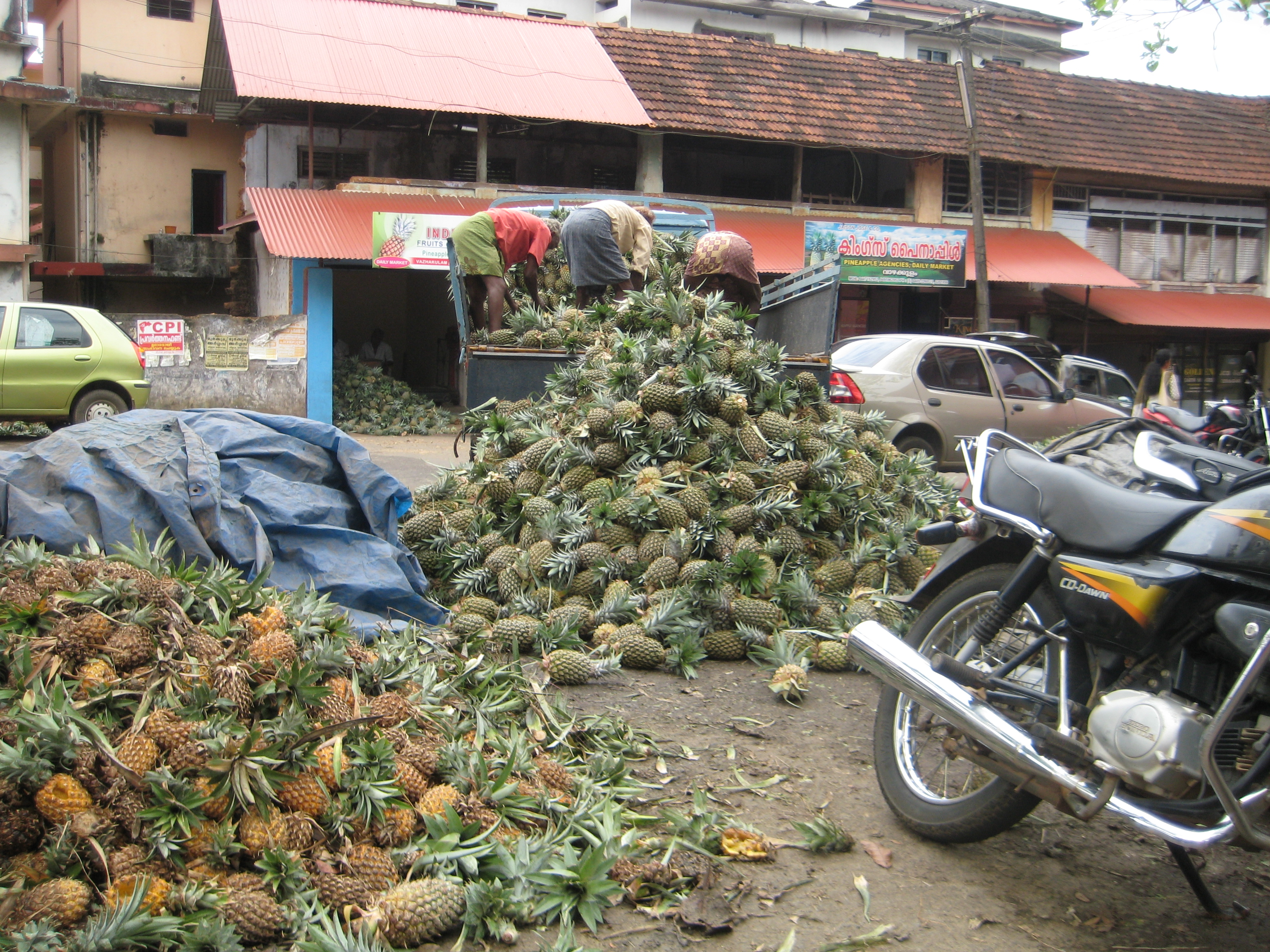
Pineapple Market

Vazhakulam is a village in Muvattupuzha Taluk, located in the Ernakulam district of the Indian state of Kerala. This town is known as Pineapple City due to its large-scale pineapple farms.

Another village named Vazhakulam, is located in Aluva.

== Economy ==
Vazhakulam is known as one of the largest pineapple markets in Asia. The Kerala Agricultural University established a Pineapple Research Station at Vazhakulam in 1995. The pineapples grown in the region have been granted a Geographical Indication (GI) tag and are marketed under the name Vazhakulam pineapple. In the 1960s and 1970s, rice was the main crop in the area, but the expansion of rubber cultivation later converted many paddy fields and estates into rubber plantations.

== Demographics ==
The population of the Vazhakulam area is predominantly composed of Syrian Catholic Christians. A significant number of Hindu families also reside in the region, contributing to the local social and cultural life. The community structure reflects the broader demographic patterns of central Kerala, with Christian and Hindu groups forming the main segments of the population.

== Educational institutions ==
- Viswajyothi College of Engineering and Technology, Vazhakulam
- St. George College, Vazhakulam
- Chavara International Academy, Vazhakulam
- Carmel CMI Public School, Vazhakulam
- Infant Jesus High School, Vazhakulam
- St. Little Theresas High School, Vazhakulam
- St. George's TTI, Vazhakulam
- St. Reetha's L.P. School, Theakkumala
- St. Thomas School, Vengachuvadu
- The Bethlehem International Vazhakulam
- Vimalamatha High School Kadalikkad
- St. Sebastian's HS, Memadangu
- Govt. L P School, Neerampuzha
- Govt. L P School, Maniyantharam

== Hospitals ==
- St. George's Hospital Vazhakulam
- Govt. Hospital Vazhakulam

== Churches ==
- St. George Syro-Malabar Catholic Forane Church
- Carmel Monastery
- Holy Family Church, Bethleham
- Assemblies of God Church
- India Pentecostal Church of God
- Pilgrims' Church (Pentecostal)
- Zion Gospel Church & Ministries
- St Sebastians church, Arikuzha

== Temple ==
Notable Hindu temples in the area include the Lord Subramanya Temple, Vallikkada Bhagavathi Temple, and Pudussery Kalari Bhagavathi Temple. Other nearby temples include the Sree Dharma Sastha Temple at Manjalloor and the Bhagavathi Temple at Kalloorkad.

== Banks ==
- Canara Bank
- Federal Bank
- State Bank Of India
- South Indian Bank
- Kerala Gramin Bank
- Service Co-operative bank No:751

== Sports ==
- Volleyball - Vazhakulam has a strong volleyball tradition and has produced several players who have represented India. Much of the local volleyball activity is associated with the St. George's Volleyball Club.
- Basketball - Basketball facilities are available at the indoor stadium of Carmel CMI Public School, which supports the development of young players in the area.

== Geography ==
Vazhakulam lies east of the town of Muvattupuzha on the Muvattupuzha - Thodupuzha road. Nearby towns include:

- Kavana
- Memadangu
- Kadalikkad
- Madakkathanam
- Manjalloor
- Kalloorkad
- Nadukkara
- Avoly
- Anikkad -Anicadu
- Vadakode
- Thekkummala
- Bethlehem
- Mullappuzhachal

== Notables ==
- K. M. George (1919–1976), founder of the Kerala Congress and a former minister in the Government of Kerala, was associated with the Muvattupuzha region.

== See also ==
- Muvattupuzha
- Arakuzha
- Thodupuzha
- Ernakulam
