= Vazhakulam pineapple =

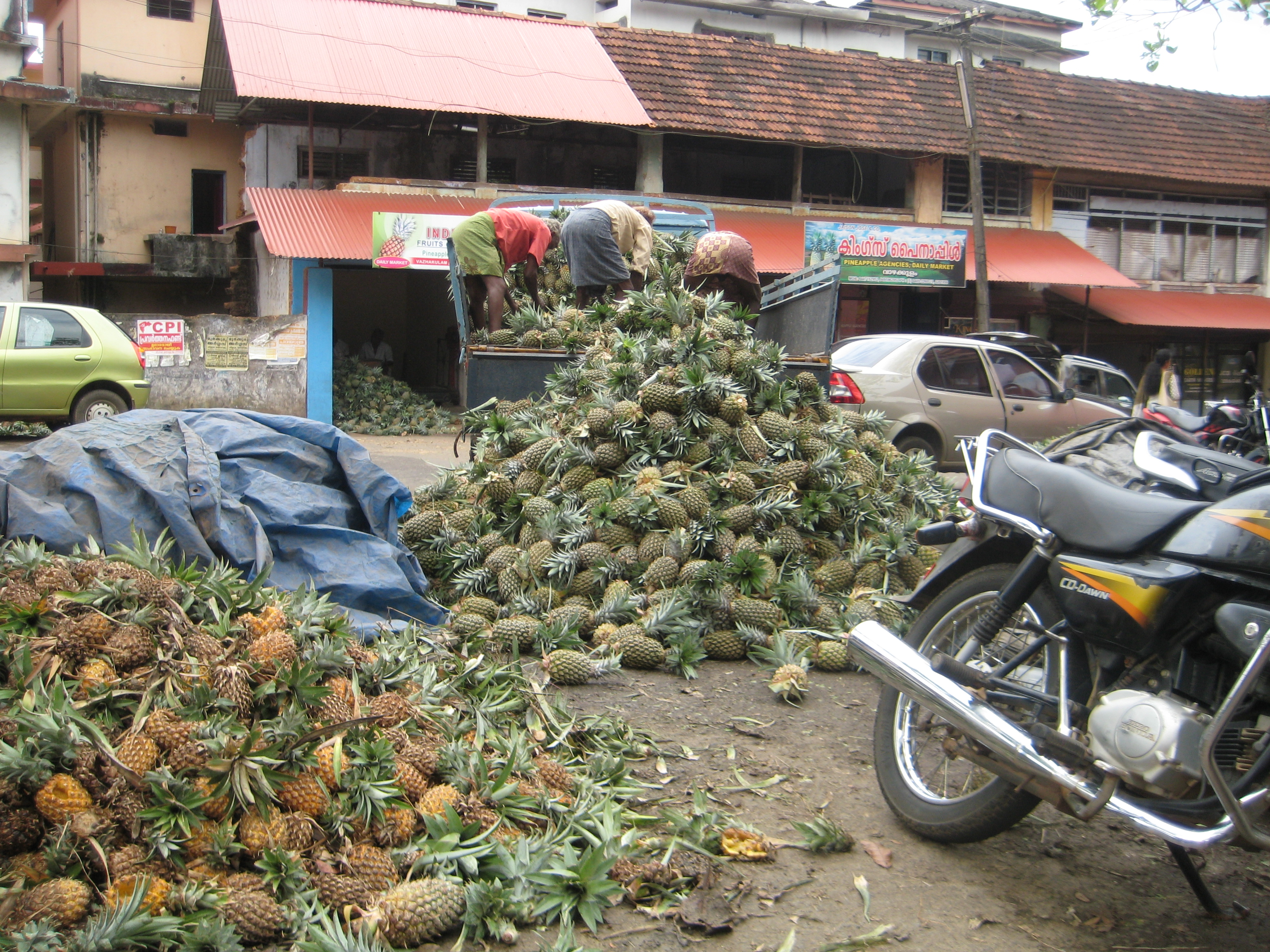
Vazhakulam Pineapple Market

Vazhakulam pineapple is the term used to refer to the pineapple produced in the Vazhakulam area in Kerala. The appellation "Vazhakulam" has been registered as Geographical Indication No. 130 at Chennai on 4 September 2009 under Agricultural-Horticultural Product category. The GI registration was granted based on an application filed by Nadukkara Agro Processing Company Ltd., Kerala Agricultural University and Pineapple Farmers Association, Vazhakulam. The GI registration specifies the specialties of this product thus: "Vazhakulam pineapple locally known as 'Kannarachakka' comes under the species Ananas comosus. The average fruit weight is 1300–1600 g. The fruit has a pleasant aroma, fruit shape is slightly conical, fruit 'eyes' deeply placed, fruit flesh is crisp and golden yellow in color, juice is sweet with 14–16° brix and its acidity is 0.50 – 0.70%. It is a good source of carotene, vitamins, minerals and energy." The Vazhakulam pineapple is cultivated in an area which spreads to about 45 km north, 40 km west, 35 km east and 110 km south from Vazhakulam, the heart land of Vazhakulam pineapple.
