= Valakam, Ernakulam =

Valakam Valakom
- village
- Location in Kerala, India Valakam (India)
- Coordinates: 9.98°N 76.52°E
- Country: India
- State: Kerala
- District: Ernakulam
- Taluk: Muvattupuzha
- Elevation: 18 m (59 ft)

Population (2011)
  - Total: 15,966
- Time zone: UTC+5:30 (IST)
- PIN: 682316
- STD Code: 0485
- 2011 census code: 628020

Valakam, also known as Valakom, is a village in the Ernakulam district of Kerala, India. It is located in the Muvattupuzha taluk, 8 kilometres (5 mi) west of the Muvattupuzha town. The National Highway 85 passes through Valakom.

== Demographics ==
According to the 2011 census of India, Valakam has 4012 households. The literacy rate of the village is 88.57%.

Demographics (2011 Census)
	Total	Male	Female
Population	15966	7975	7991
Children aged below 6 years	1339	698	641
Scheduled caste	653	326	327
Scheduled tribe	49	28	21
Literates	14141	7142	6999
Workers (all)	6080	4455	1625
Main workers (total)	5234	4034	1200
Main workers: Cultivators	570	538	32
Main workers: Agricultural labourers	354	253	101
Main workers: Household industry workers	73	58	15
Main workers: Other	4237	3185	1052
Marginal workers (total)	846	421	425
Marginal workers: Cultivators	75	55	20
Marginal workers: Agricultural labourers	103	49	54
Marginal workers: Household industry workers	20	7	13
Marginal workers: Others	648	310	338
Non-workers	9886	3520	6366

== Places of worship ==
- St Thomas Evangelical Church, Valakom
- Christian Brethren Church, Valakom
- St. George church, Valakom
- Marthoma Church, Valakom
- Ambaloor Mahadeva temple. Mekkadampu, valakom
- IPC Hebron church Valakom
- St. Mary's Church, Rackad.

== Education ==
- MS High School Valakom
- Govt. lower primary school Valakom
- MIN Public School Mekkadampu
- Bright Public School Valakom
