= Babu Paul =

Indian politician

Babu Paul (born 7 July 1955) is an Indian politician from the Communist Party of India. He represented Muvattupuzha constituency in 12th Kerala Legislative Assembly.
