= Madakkathanam =

- village
- Location in Kerala, India Madakkathanam (India)
- Coordinates: 9°55′09″N 76°41′05″E
- Country: India
- State: Kerala
- District: Ernakulam

Languages
  - Official: Malayalam, English
- Time zone: UTC+5:30 (IST)
- PIN: 686670
- Telephone code: 04862
- Vehicle registration: KL-17
- Nearest city: Thodupuzha

Madakkathanam is a village located in the Ernakulam district of the Indian state of Kerala.

== See also ==
- Main Eastern Highway
