= Yeldos =

Yeldos or Eldos (Kazakh or Russian: Елдос) is a Kazakh male given name. Notable people with the given name include:

- Yeldos Akhmetov (born 1990), Kazakh football defender
- Yeldos Ikhsangaliyev (born 1978), Kazakh judoka
- Yeldos Smetov (born 1992), Kazakh judoka

== See also ==
- Eldho
- Eldo
