= Thrissur Orthodox Diocese =

Diocese of the Malankara Orthodox Syrian Church

Diocese of Thrissur

Orthodox
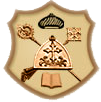
- Catholicate Emblem

Location
- Country: India
- Territory: Thrissur
- Metropolitan: H. G. Yuhanon Mar Meletius
- Headquarters: Gedseemon Orthodox Bishop's House, Mannuthy, Thrissur, Kerala 680 651

Information
- Rite: Malankara Rite
- Established: 1982
- Diocese: Thrissur Diocese
- Parent church: Malankara Orthodox Syrian Church

Website
- Thrissur Diocese

Thrissur Diocese is one of the 32 dioceses of the Malankara Orthodox Syrian Church with its headquarters at Mannuthy, Kerala. As of 2023, the metropolitan of the diocese was Yuhanon Meletius.

== History ==
The diocese was formed in 1982 with parishes in Thrissur and Palakkad districts. At the time of the formation of the diocese there were 32 parishes and 26 priests. The present diocesan headquarters was completed in 1995.

== Institutions and mission ==
The diocese has one upper primary school in Palakkadu district and a study center, near Thrissur. The diocese runs a community development project called "Anveshi, Thrissru" which helps people to help themselves. The diocese has a mission in Burbank, near Los Angeles, CA in USA with 300+ families of Mediterranean origin. For the last several years the diocese has been in continuous struggle to make the unity of the Church a reality.

== Headquarters ==
The headquarters of the diocese is at Mannuthy. Address: Gedseemon Orthodox Bishop's House, Mannuthy, Thrissur, Kerala, INDIA. 680651. Tel. +4872371039. The house was built with help from people of the Church at various parts of the world under the leadership of Metropolitan Yuhanon Mar Meletius. A small parish worships in the chapel in the diocesan headquarters. Due to lack of space a new plot was purchased adjacent to the headquarters' building and a new chapel is constructed. The chapel is named "St. Mary's Unity Chapel". It symbolizes the Church unity efforts of the diocese.

== Parish List ==
- Alaikalkulambu St.Marys Orthodox Church
- Chalishery St.Peters and St.Pauls Orthodox Church
- Cherukunnam St.Thomas Orthodox Church
- Chuvanammanu St.George Orthodox Church
- Elanadu St.Marys Orthodox Church
- Erukumchira St.Marys Orthodox Church
- Kakkanikkadu St.George Orthodox Church
- Kakkanikkadu St.Gregorios Orthodox Church
- Kallampara St.Marys Orthodox Church
- Kannara St.Marys Orthodox Church
- Katilapoovam St.Marys Orthodox Church
- Kairady St.Marys Orthodox Church
- Kodaly St.George Orthodox Church
- Kombzha Mar Gregorios Orthodox Church
- Mambra St.Kuriakose Orthodox Church
- Mangalamdam St.Marys Orthodox Church
- Mannuthy St.Marys Orthodox Church
- Marmcode St.George Orthodox Church
- Maorotichal St.George Orthodox Church
- Nelleppally St.Johns Orthodox Church
- Paithala Mar Gregorios Orthodox Church
- Pazhayannoor Eldho Mar Baselios Orthodox Church
- Pazhayannoor St.Marys Orthodox Church
- Pazhayannoorpadam St.Johns Orthodox Church
- Peechy St.George Orthodox Church
- Pulakodu St.Marys Orthodox Church
- Thenidukku St.George Orthodox Church
- Thrikanaya St.George Orthodox Church
- Valkulambu Mar Gregorios Orthodox Church
- Valkulambu St.Thomas Orthodox Church
- Vattai St.Marys Orthodox Church
- Vatuly St.George Orthodox Church
- Vellikulangara St.Marys Orthodox Church
- DesertLand St.Dinysious Orthodox Church
- DesertLand St.George Orthodox Church
- DesertLand St.Gregorios Orthodox Church
- Kaimoor St.George Orthodox Church
- Olavakodu St.Peters Orthodox Church
- Karimba St.George Orthodox Church
- Vellapadom St.George Orthodox Church
- Chelakkara St.George Orthodox puthenpali
