= P. V. Abraham =

Indian politician

P. V. Abraham (September 1928 - August 1989) was an Indian politician from the Communist Party of India. He represented Muvattupuzha constituency in 3rd Kerala Legislative Assembly.

P. V. Abraham was a teacher before coming into active politics. He actively participated in the freedom struggle and was a well-known trade unionist. He was twice the president of Maradi panchayat.

He died in August 1989.
