= Joseph Vazhackan =

Indian politician

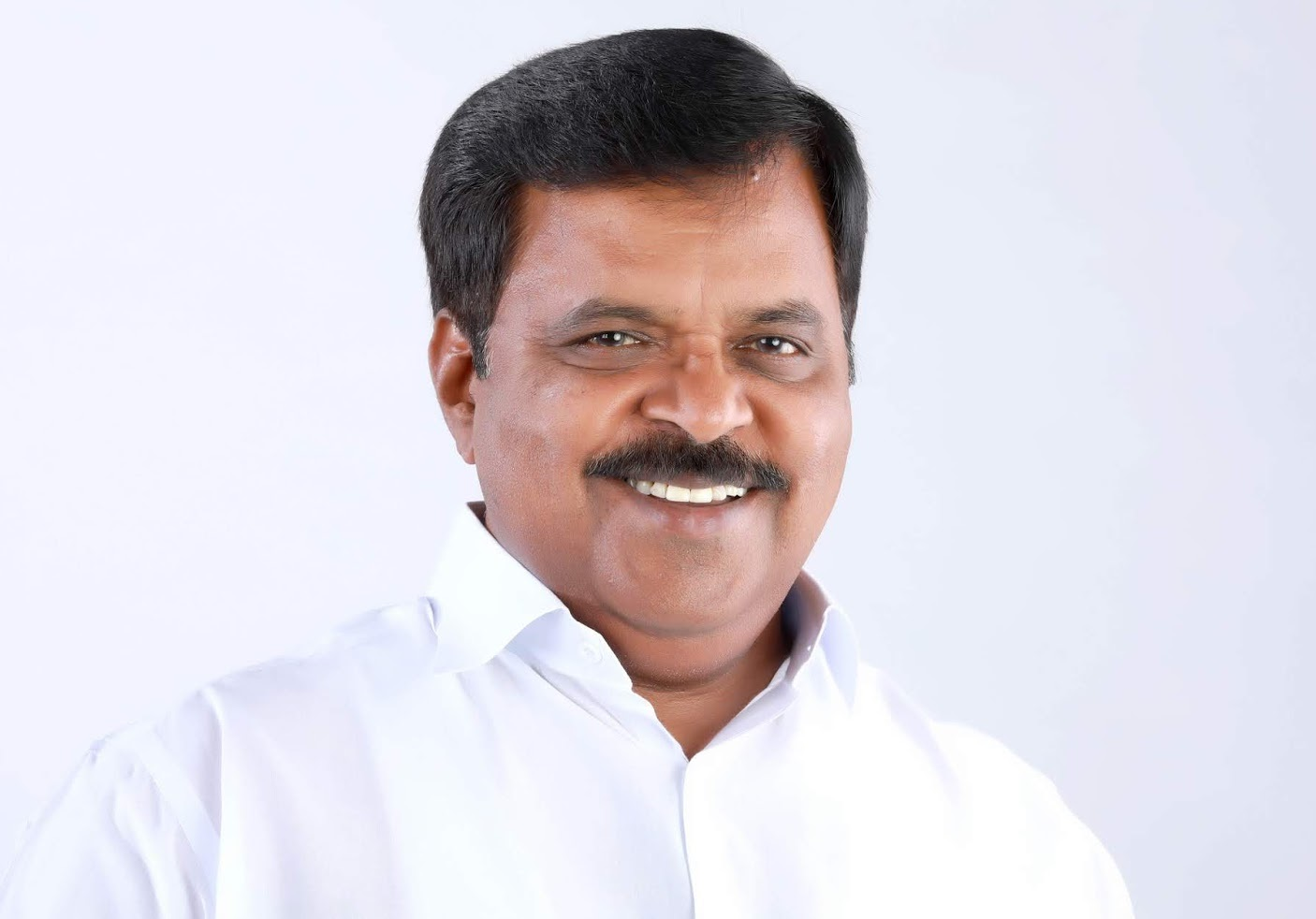

Personal details
- Born: Ramapuram, Kottayam
- Party: Indian National Congress
- Spouse: Leela Joseph
- Children: 2 Daughters
- Occupation: Politician, Social Worker
- Website: http://josephvazhackan.in

Joseph Vazhackan (Malayalam: ജോസഫ് വാഴക്കന്‍) is an Indian politician from Kerala. He belongs to the Indian National Congress party. He represented Muvattupuzha Constituency in the 13th Kerala Legislative Assembly. He is currently the Vice President and Spokesperson of Kerala Pradesh Congress Committee (KPCC). He is also a Member of All India Congress Committee (AICC).

Joseph Vazhackan came to the public platform by leading the student movements in his school days and became Kerala Students Union (KSU) State President. He has headed several INTUC affiliated unions.

== Political life ==
- Vice President, Kerala Pradesh Congress Committee (KPCC) (2011-2021)
- Member of the Legislative Assembly (India), Muvattupuzha (2011-2016)
- General Secretary, Kerala Pradesh Congress Committee (KPCC) (1999-2011)
- Indian Rubber Board Member (2004-2012)
- Kottayam District Panchayat Opposition leader (1995-2000)
- Secretary, Kerala Pradesh Congress Committee (KPCC) (1994-1999)
- Indian Youth Congress, Kerala State General Secretary (1984-1994)
- State President of Kerala Students Union (KSU) (1982-1983)

== Personal life ==
Joseph Vazhackan was born at Ramapuram (near Pala), Kottayam district on February 6, 1957.
