= P. C. Joseph =

Indian politician

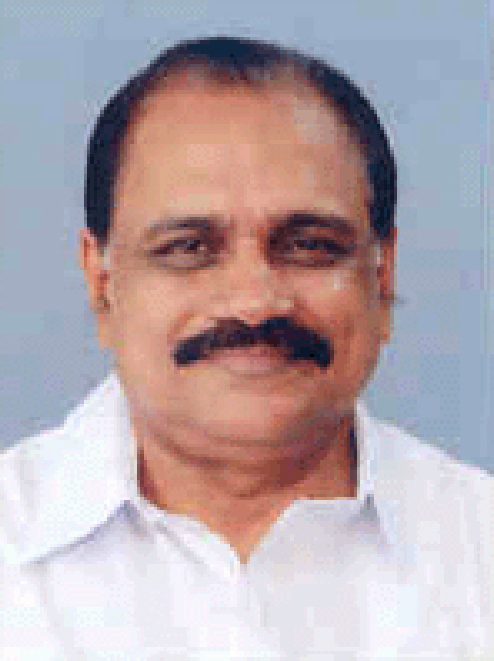
- P. C. Joseph at Poonjar

Personal details
- Born: 19 September 1949 (age 76) Muvattupuzha, Kottayam district, Travancore-Cochin
- Party: Janadhipathya Kerala Congress
- Spouse: Pouly Joseph
- Children: 2
- As of 23 September, 2006

Ponnattu Chacko Joseph (P. C. Joseph) is an Indian politician and a member of Janadhipathya Kerala Congress, one of the main factions of the Kerala Congress, a party born in Central Travancore or Central South Kerala region focusing on the interest of Kerala farmers. He was a member of the Kerala Legislature (Niyamasabha Mandiram), representing the Muvattupuzha constituency of Kerala.

P. C. Joseph is the son of Shri Chacko and Smt. Mariama, of the Ponnattu house. He is married to Pouly and has two sons.

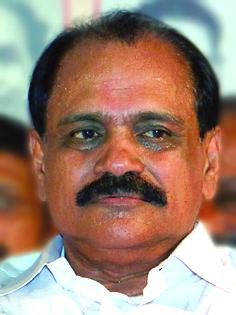
