= Palakkuzha =

- village
- Location in Kerala, India Palakkuzha (India)
- Coordinates: 9°53′0″N 76°36′50″E
- Country: India
- State: Kerala
- District: Ernakulam

Population (2011)
  - Total: 13,412

Languages
  - Official: Malayalam, English
- Time zone: UTC+5:30 (IST)

Palakkuzha is a village in Ernakulam district in the Indian state of Kerala. It is located in the alternate route from Koothattukulam to Muvattupuzha. The nearest points are Pandappilly, Kozhippilly. The village lies 48 km from Ernakulam city and 13 km from Muvattupuzha.

== Demographics ==
As of 2011 India census, Palakkuzha had a population of 13412 with 6584 males and 6828 females.
