= Eldo T. Ridgway =

American politician

Eldo Ridgway

Mayor of Elkhorn
- In office 1928–1934

Member of the Wisconsin Senate from the 22nd district
- In office 1921–1925
- Preceded by: Lawrence E. Cunningham
- Succeeded by: George W. Hull

Personal details
- Born: Eldo T. Ridgway; December 17, 1880 Knox, Indiana, U.S.
- Died: October 12, 1955 (aged 74) Lebanon, Illinois, U.S.
- Party: Republican
- Website: Official bio

Eldo T. Ridgway (December 17, 1880 – October 12, 1955) was an American physician and politician.

Born in Knox, Indiana, Ridgway received his medical degree from Hahnemann Medical College and Hospital in Chicago, Illinois in 1906. He started his medical practice in Wautoma, Wisconsin and then moved to Elkhorn, Wisconsin in 1912. Ridgway served in the Wisconsin State Senate from 1921 to 1925 and was a Republican. From 1928 to 1934, Ridgway served as mayor of Elkhorn. He also served on the board of education and the Elkhorn City Power and Light Commission. Ridgway moved to California in 1944, but later returned and reopen his medical practice. He died in Lebanon, Illinois.
