= Maneed =

- village
- Location in Kerala, India Maneed (India)
- Coordinates: 9°54′30″N 76°27′30″E
- Country: India
- State: Kerala
- District: Ernakulam

Population (2011)
  - Total: 16,980

Languages
  - Official: Malayalam, English
- Time zone: UTC+5:30 (IST)

Maneed is a village/ rurban area in Ernakulam district in the Indian state of Kerala.

== Demographics ==
- As of 2011 India census, Maneed had a population of 16980 with 8408 males and 8572 females.
- Nearest town Piravom
- Nearest city Kochi

== Major attractions ==
- Govt LP School
- Govt High School
- Govt Hospital
- Maneed village Office
- Maneed Panchayath
- Nechoor Kavala
- Maneed Palli (previously Kiliamangalath Church)
- Sree Narayana Temple Maneed
- Nechoor Palli (200 yrs old)
- Madakkil Kavu
- Moovattupuza River
- YMCA hall, YMCA junction
- Mini civil station Anamunthi
- Kiliamangalath building Anamunthi(100 years old)
- Maneed Puncha scattered over 1000 ha of land
- Insight Media City (Flowers Channel Studio)
- First ever Rubber plantation started in Ernakulam District is in Maneed By Planter V.M. Peter Kolleenal, he planted the rubber about 90 years back. ST. Thomas Rubber estate started near to Anamunthi junction now known as Gandhi Square.
