= Manjalloor =

- village
- Location in Kerala, India Manjalloor (India)
- Coordinates: 9.9419674°N 76.6395092°E
- Country: India
- State: Kerala
- District: Ernakulam

Population (2011)
  - Total: 17,145

Languages
  - Official: Malayalam, English
- Time zone: UTC+5:30 (IST)

Manjalloor is a village in Ernakulam district in the Indian state of Kerala. Manjalloor is a rural village, 3 km from Vazhakulam. It belongs to Manjallor Gramapanchayat, Muvattupuzha taluk, Ernakulam district, Kerala. SH-8 highway passes near the village and can be reached via Vengachuvadu from SH-8. The Manjalloor Bhagavati Sastha temple is located in the heart of the village.

== Demograpghics ==
As of 2011 India census, Manjalloor had a population of 17145 with 8448 males and 8697 females.
