= Kalloorkkad =

Kallorkkad
- Village
- Location in Kerala, India Kallorkkad (India)
- Coordinates: 9°57′0″N 76°40′0″E
- Country: India
- State: Kerala
- District: Ernakulam

Government
  - Type: Panchayath
  - Body: Kallorkkad Grama Panchayath

Area
  - Total: 23.95 km^{2} (9.25 sq mi)

Population (2011)
  - Total: 12,911
  - Density: 529/km^{2} (1,370/sq mi)

Languages
  - Official: Malayalam, English
- Time zone: UTC+5:30 (IST)
- PIN: 686668
- Telephone code: 0485
- Vehicle registration: KL-17
- Nearest city: Muvattupuzha
- Lok Sabha constituency: Idukki
- Climate: Tropical monsoon (Köppen)
- Avg. summer temperature: 32.5 °C (90.5 °F)
- Avg. winter temperature: 20 °C (68 °F)
- Website: lsgkerala.in/kallorkkadpanchayat/kallorkkad/

Kallorkkad is a village in Ernakulam district, in the Indian state of Kerala. It is a panchayath and it has minor towns such as Nakapuzha, and Kaloor. Most of its people are either farmers or engaged in small-scale business.

== Location ==
Kalloorkkad is situated near Muvattupuzha taluk of Kerala State, 13 km from Muvattupuzha, 12 km from Thodupuzha, and 5 km from Vazhakulam. Kalloorkkad village is located on the border of Ernakulam district, very near the Idukki district. The economy is reliant on agriculture, and the main cultivations are rubber and pineapple. The village is well connected with towns like Thodupuzha, Muvattupuzha and Kothamangalam through local bus transport, and there are some KSRTC buses also present.

== Demographics ==
As of 2011 census, it had a population of 12911 with 6466 males and 6445 females. The village is mainly made up of Syrian Catholic Christians and Hindus. Muslims are very rare compared to other nearby places.

== Education ==
There are three high schools, two upper primary schools and one higher secondary school.

== Religious institutions ==
St. Mary's Church, Nakapuzha, is a famous Marian pilgrimage centre in Kerala, where many come during the festivals. The festival is from 1 September to 15 September. There are three more churches: Kalloorkad, Thazhuvamkunnu and Kaloor. There is also Kalloorkad Bhagavathy Kshethram, Kalloorkad Sreekrishna Swami temple and Santhukad (Nakapuzha) Kshethram.

== Government ==
The place falls under the Muvattupuzha assembly constituency, which is part of Idukki (Lok Sabha constituency). It was part of Muvattupuzha (Lok Sabha constituency) until 2004.

In Kalloorkad, government services such as the fire station, police station, government hospital, village office, registrar office, treasury, veterinary hospital, Krishibhavan, BSNL office, and school are easily accessible.
