= Ayavana =

- Country: India
- State: Kerala
- District: Ernakulam district

Languages
- Time zone: UTC+5:30 (IST)

Ayavana is a panchayath in Ernakulam district in the Indian state of Kerala. It is situated 8 km away from Muvattupuzha on the banks of river Kaliyar. Ayavana panchayath includes Anchelpetty, Kakkattoor, Kalampoor, Enanalloor, Kavakkad, Karimattom etc.

== Economy ==
Rubber, pineapple, and coconut are the main cultivations of this village.

== Schools ==
Ayavana Sacred Heart Higher Secondary School, Ayavana Sree Narayana UP School, Enanalloor South Ayavana Panchayat LPS, Kalampoor Govt. LPS, Karimattom Govt. LPS and Ayavana Sacred Heart LPS are the main schools in the Panchayath

== Religion ==
There are a number of temples, churches, and mosques here. People from all religions live together. Kalampoor Bhagavathy Shastha Temple, Thrikka Mahavishnu Temple, Thrippoorathu Sreekrishna Swamy temple, Peramangalam shiva temple, Parapuzhakkavu Bhagavathi temple are the Main Temples of this Gram Panchayat. Sacred Heart Church Ayavana, St. Mary's Jacobite Church Kalampoor, St. Mary's Church Karimattom etc. are the most important churches in the Panchayath.
