= Places of worship in Piravom =

Notable places of worship in the town of Piravom in the Indian state of Kerala, include the Pazhoor Perumthrikkovil temple of Shiva and St. Mary's Orthodox Syrian Cathedral.
