= Piravom Assembly constituency =

Constituency of the Kerala legislative assembly in India

Piravom
- Constituency No. 85 for the Kerala Legislative Assembly
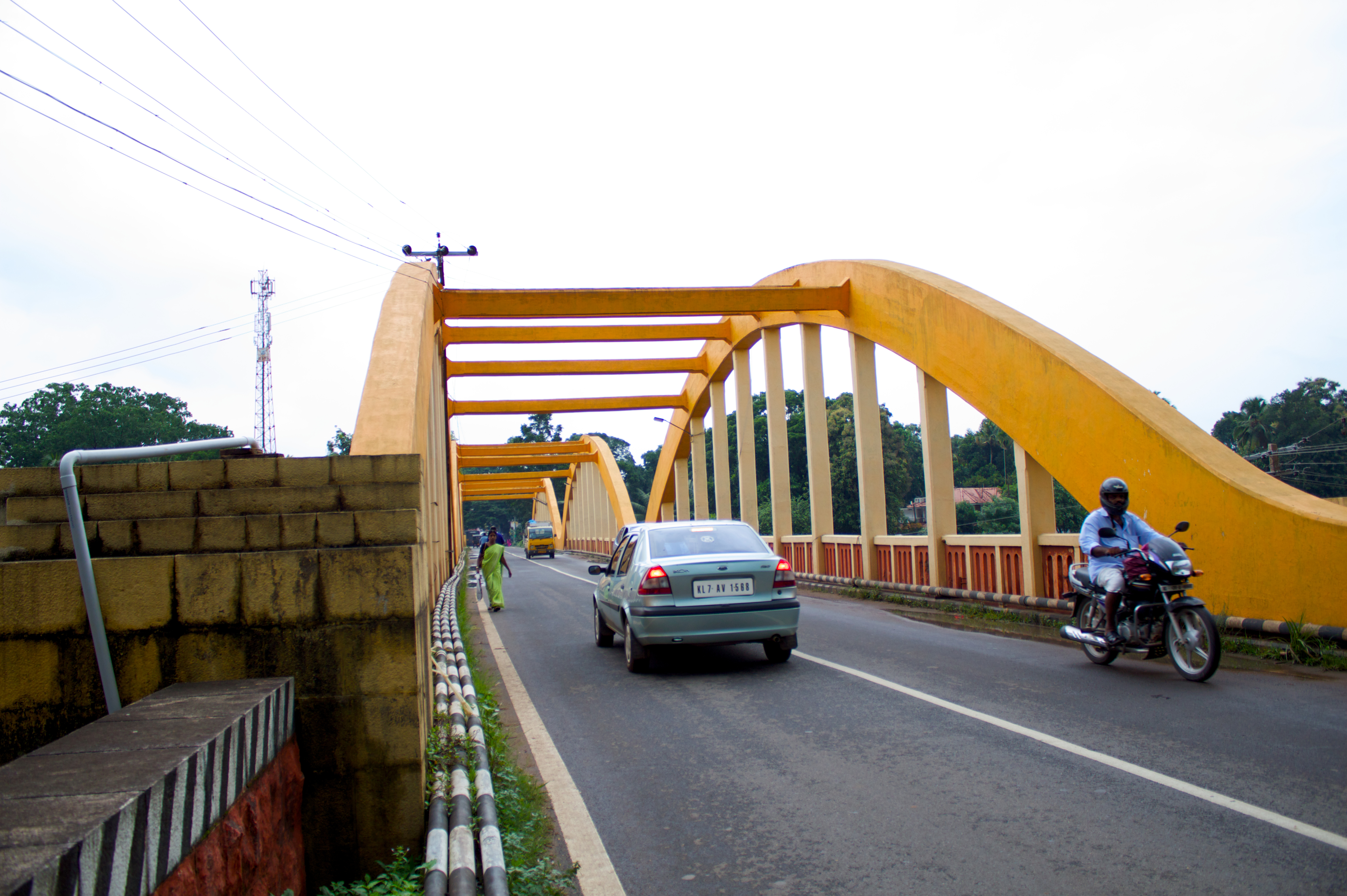
- Piravom Bridge in Piravom Assembly constituency

Constituency details
- Country: India
- Region: South India
- State: Kerala
- District: Ernakulam
- Established: 1957
- Total electors: 2,00,003 (2016)
- Reservation: None

Member of Legislative Assembly
- 16th Kerala Legislative Assembly
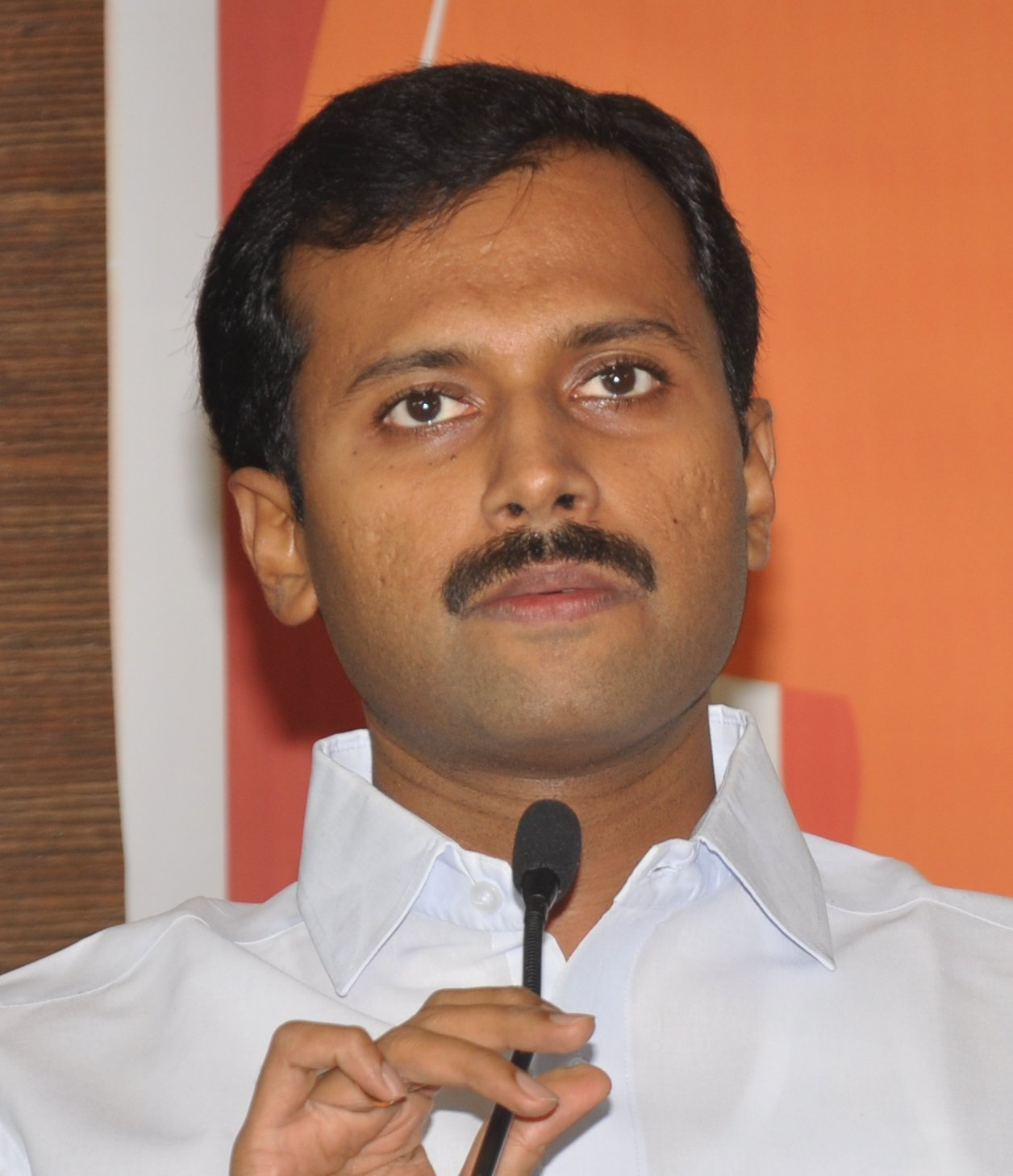
- Incumbent Anoop Jacob
- Party: KC(J)
- Alliance: UDF
- Elected year: 2026

Piravom State assembly constituency is one of the 140 state legislative assembly constituencies in Kerala in southern India. It is also one of the seven state legislative assembly constituencies included in Kottayam Lok Sabha constituency. As of the 2026 Assembly elections, the current MLA is Anoop Jacob of KC(J).

== Local self-governed segments ==
Piravom Assembly constituency is composed of the following local self-governed segments:

Sl no.	Name	Status (Grama panchayat/Municipality)	Taluk
1	Elanji	Grama panchayat	Muvattupuzha
2	Maneed	Grama panchayat	Muvattupuzha
3	Pampakuda	Grama panchayat	Muvattupuzha
4	Ramamangalam	Grama panchayat	Muvattupuzha
5	Thirumarady	Grama panchayat	Muvattupuzha
6	Amballur	Grama panchayat	Kanayannur
7	Edakkattuvayal	Grama panchayat	Kanayannur
8	Chottanikkara	Grama panchayat	Kanayannur
9	Mulanthuruthy	Grama panchayat	Kanayannur
10	Thiruvankulam region of Thrippunithura	Municipality	Kanayannur
11	Piravom	Municipality	Muvattupuzha
12	Koothattukulam	Municipality	Muvattupuzha

== Members of Legislative Assembly ==
The following list contains all members of Kerala Legislative Assembly who have represented the constituency:

Election	Name	Party
1977	T. M. Jacob	Kerala Congress
1980	P. C. Chacko	Indian National Congress (U)
1982	Benny Behanan	Independent
1987	Gopi Kottaramunikkal	Communist Party of India
1991	T. M. Jacob	Kerala Congress (M)
1996	T. M. Jacob	Kerala Congress (Jacob)
2001	T. M. Jacob	Kerala Congress (Jacob)
2006	M. J. Jacob	Communist Party of India
2011	T. M. Jacob	Kerala Congress (Jacob)
2012*	Anoop Jacob	Kerala Congress (Jacob)
2016	Anoop Jacob	Kerala Congress (Jacob)
2021	Anoop Jacob	Kerala Congress (Jacob)
2026	Anoop Jacob	Kerala Congress (Jacob)

*by-election

== Election results ==
Percentage change (±%) denotes the change in the number of votes from the immediate previous election.

=== 2026 ===
2026 Kerala Legislative Assembly election: Piravom
Party	Candidate	Votes	%	±%
KC(J)	Anoop Jacob	89,551	58.77	
KC(M)	Sabu K. Jacob	44,870	29.44	
TTP	Jibi Abraham	14,861	9.75	
AAP	Eldho Abraham	1,004	0.66	
NOTA	None of the above	1,105	0.73	
Margin of victory		44,681		
Turnout		1,52,386		
KC(J) hold		Swing		

=== 2021 ===
Kerala Legislative Assembly Election, 2021: Piravom
Party	Candidate	Votes	%	±%
KC(J)	Anoop Jacob	85,056	53.8	▲8.03
KC(M)	Sindhumol Jacob	59,692	37.76	
BJP	N. Ashish	11,021	6.97	
NOTA	None of the above	1109	0.7	
Majority		25,364	16.04	▲12.20
Turnout		1,58,097	74.62	▼7.04
Registered electors		2,11,861		
KC(J) hold		Swing		

=== 2016 ===
There were 1,81,261 registered voters in the constituency for the 2016 Kerala Assembly election.

2016 Kerala Legislative Assembly election: Piravom
Party	Candidate	Votes	%	±%
KC(J)	Anoop Jacob	73,770	45.77	▼7.04
CPI(M)	M. J .Jacob	67,575	41.93	▼0.32
BDJS	C. P. Sathyan	17,503	10.86	−
NOTA	None of the above	964	0.60	−
PpGP	Gireesh	485	0.30	−
SUCI(C)	K. O. Sudheer	342	0.21	−
Independent	Anoop	298	0.18	−
Independent	Rajan	233	0.14	−
Margin of victory		6,195	3.84	▼3.86
Turnout		1,61,770	80.58	▼5.72
KC(J) hold		Swing	▼7.04	

=== 2012 by-election ===
A by-election was held in Piravom Assembly constituency following the death of the sitting MLA and minister T. M. Jacob on 30 October 2011. There were 1,81,556 registered voters in the constituency for the resulting by-election.

2012 by-election: Piravom
Party	Candidate	Votes	%	±%
KC(J)	Anoop Jacob	82,756	52.81	▲5.28
CPI(M)	M. J. Jacob	70,686	45.11	▼2.30
BJP	K. R. Rajagopal	3,241	2.07	▼0.96
Margin of victory		12,071	7.70	▲7.58
Turnout		1,56,683	86.30	▲6.93
KC(J) hold		Swing	▲5.28	

=== 2011 ===
There were 1,59,877 registered voters in the constituency for the 2011 election.

2011 Kerala Legislative Assembly election: Piravom
Party	Candidate	Votes	%	±%
KC(J)	T. M. Jacob	66,503	47.53	
CPI(M)	M. J. Jacob	66,346	47.41	
BJP	M. N. Madhu	4,234	3.03	−
Independent	Sau Kunjappan	958	0.65	−
SUCI(C)	M. K. Usha	908	0.65	−
Margin of victory		157	0.12	
Turnout		1,39,928	79.37	
KC(J) gain from CPI(M)		Swing		

== See also ==
- Piravom
- Ernakulam district
- List of constituencies of the Kerala Legislative Assembly
- 2016 Kerala Legislative Assembly election
