= Veliyanad =

- village
- Location in Kerala, India Veliyanad (India)
- Coordinates: 9°51′0″N 76°30′0″E
- Country: India
- State: Kerala
- District: Ernakulam

Population (2001)
  - Total: 8,437

Languages
  - Official: Malayalam, English
- Time zone: UTC+5:30 (IST)
- PIN: 682313
- Vehicle registration: KL-07
- Literacy: 100%%
- Lok Sabha constituency: Kottayam
- assembly constituency: piravom
- Climate: Moderate (Köppen)

Veliyanad is a small village in the Ernakulam District of the state of Kerala in southern India. It belongs to the Edakkattuvayal panjayat and Kanayannoor Taluk. The village is around 30 km from the city of Kochi. nearby city is Piravom The nearest airport is Cochin International Airport. Piravom Road, Ernakulam Town and Ernakulam Junction Railway Stations are the closest major railway stations.

The maternal home and birthplace of Adi Shankaracharya at Veliyanad, Piravom

== Etymology ==
The name Piravom derived from a word 'Piravi' in Malayalam means 'birth'. There are two beliefs about the etymology of the name.

- It is believed that the name originated from a reference to the Nativity . There is a concentration of temples named after the Puranas in and around Piravom, as against only another three so named in the rest of India.
- It is believed that the name originated from the story of Adi Shankara's birth. The local legend says, the origin of the name Veliyanadu is from 'Veliyam/Velicham konda nadu' which means the 'land where the light evolved' might be referring to Sankaracharyas birth and the light of knowledge thus originated and spread.

Also it is near to Piravom which also has got a connection with the birth of Sri Adi Sankaracharya. (Piravi in Malayalam means birth, Sri Sankara's birth made this place as Piravom). Mel Pazhoor Mana is believed as the birthplace of Adi Sankaracharya, which is the home of Aryamba, his holy mother. It is located near Piravom.

== Places of interest ==
- Chinmaya Vishwavidyapeeth: A deemed university under de-novo category, situated in the birth home of Adi Shankara.
- Chinmaya International Foundation : An organization dedicated to research and the spread of Advaita Vedanta across the world, founded by Swami Chinmayananda Saraswathi.
- Chinmaya Swayambhu Ayyappa Temple
- Melpazhur Mana: renamed as Adi Sankara Nilayam, this is a sprawling nalukettu located in Veliyanad at Edakkattuvayal Village in Ernakulam. This mana was acquired by Chinmaya International Foundation. It is refurbished and currently it is the home of the Chinmaya International Foundation.
- Thottoor siva temple

Also Pazhoor Perumthrikkovil is 3 km from Veliyanad. Thirumarayoor Rama's Temple is 2 km from Veliyanad is one of the few ancient Rama temples in Kerala.

Pazhoor Padippurais 4 km from Veliyanad. It is an astrology center linked to Pazhoor Perumthrikkovil located in Piravom is referred in the Aithihyamala by Kottarathil Sankunni.

== Educational institutions ==
- Chinmaya Vishwavidyapeeth: A deemed university under de-novo category, situated in the birth home of Adi Shankara.
- TocH Engineering college (2 km from Veliyanad)
- Chinmaya International Foundation
- St. Paul's High School, Veliyanad
- GUPS Veliyanad

== Recreational Clubs ==
- Young Waves Arts and Sports Club : A group of young and energetic people, which was started in the year 2005. Since then, the club has played a major role in conducting the cultural celebrations in the area mainly Onam.

== Adi Shankara Nilayam ==
Located in Veliyanad, Adi Shankara Nilayam is the ancestral maternal house of Shri Shankara. It is a sprawling nalukettu located in Veliyanad at Edakkattuvayal Village in Ernakulam. Traditionally known as the 'Melpazhur Mana', the place was renamed as Adi Shankara Nilayam by Swami Chinmayananda Saraswathi. Now the property has been acquired by the Chinmaya International Foundation. The nalukettu is decorated with exquisite wooden paneling and engravings. A meditation hall in memory of Swami Chinmayananda Saraswathi is there nearby. Situated in 8.3 acres (34,000 m^{2}) of land, the property houses a water pond, a temple complex, an excellent library, a computer unit and residential accommodation for visiting scholars. There is a large temple dedicated to the deity of the family - swayambhu Shasta (Lord Ayyappa). A Naga Yakshi temple and a temple for Vettakkorumakan are also seen in the complex.
