= Surendran Nair =

Indian artist (born 1956)

- Born: 1956 (age 69–70); Onakkoor, Kerala India
- Known for: Painting

Surendran Nair (born 1956) is an Indian artist who works with watercolour, printmaking and oils and his works are inspired from surrealism and symbolism.

== Early life ==
Nair was born in the south Indian state of Kerala where he took a diploma in painting from the College of Fine Arts Trivandrum. Later he pursued postgraduate work at the Faculty of Fine Arts, M.S.U., Baroda, taking a diploma in printmaking.

== Career ==
Nair worked in a realistic style during the 1980s, creating both strong pen and ink drawings and also etchings and lithographs. His works from these years were primarily portraits. In the 1990s Nair worked more and more with oil on canvas, starting his long preoccupation with "corollary mythologies" that drew upon ancient allegories reinvented as modern day fables.

Near the end of the 1990s Nair created a portfolio of hand-coloured etchings collectively titled "The Labyrinth of Eternal Delight". The imagery in these etchings has parallels with the works of the Italian artist Francesco Clemente, but actually is a direct outgrowth from Nair's "Corollary Mythologies".

The artist has become known not only for his paintings, but also for his lengthy titles, such as "Tonight I am Coming to Visit You in Your Dream and None Will See and Question Me; Be Sure to Leave Your Door Unlocked, Cuckoonebulopolis, 2002". This series, "Cuckoonebulopolis", was the artist's primary statement in the first decade of the 21st century.

Nair became famed in India during 2000 for his painting "An Actor Rehearsing the Interior Monologue of Icarus" which depicts a naked man with strapped-on wings standing atop the Ashoka Column. An uproar was created when governing bodies dominated by right wing nationalist groups decided this painting should be rejected from an exhibition at the National Gallery of Modern Art in New Delhi on the grounds that it was irreverent toward a national symbol. Nair proceed to remove both himself and all of his paintings in a protest that was supported by India's artistic and cultural community.

== Collections ==
Nair's works can be found in collections that include the Fukuoka Asian Art Museum, the Queensland Art Gallery, The National Gallery of Australia, and The National Gallery of Modern Art, New Delhi.

== Major exhibitions ==
Third Asia-Pacific Triennial of Contemporary Art (APT3), Queensland Art Gallery, Brisbane, Australia (1999)
