= Pazhur =

Village in Kozhikode district, Kerala, India

Pazhur പാഴൂർ
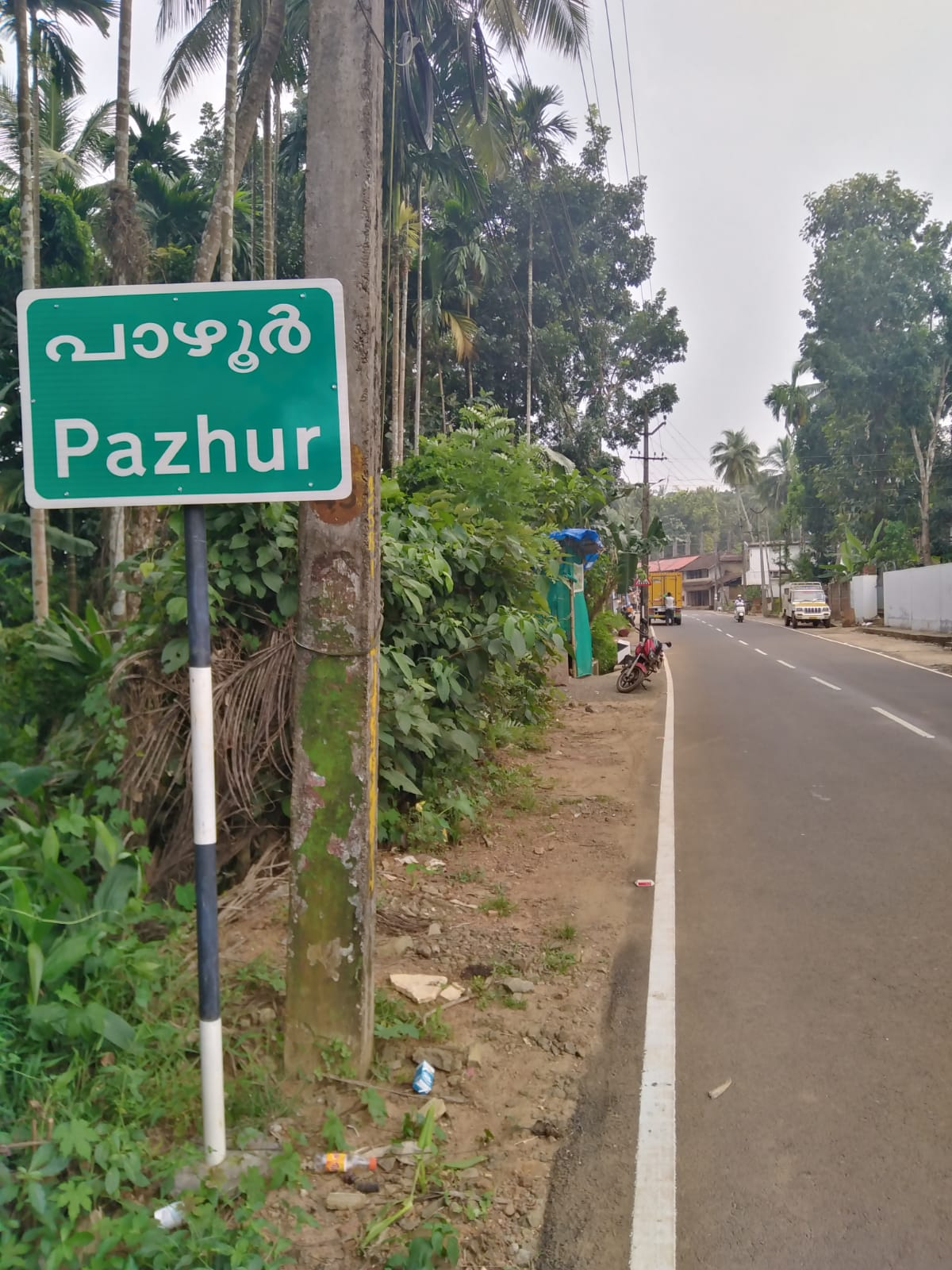

- Location within Kerala
- Coordinates: 11.282299°N 75.974827°E
- Country: India
- State: Kerala
- District: Kozhikode

Government
  - Type: Gram panchayat
  - Body: Chathamangalam Gram Panchayat
- Time zone: UTC+05:30
- PIN: 673661
- Telephone code: 0495
- Vehicle registration: KL-11, KL-57

Pazhur (Malayalam: പാഴൂർ) is a village in the Chathamangalam Gram Panchayat of Kozhikode district, Kerala, India. The village was formerly known as Kadandam (Malayalam: കടണ്ടം). It lies close to the Iruvanjippuzha, about 4 km (2.5 mi) from Mavoor and 25 km (16 mi) from Kozhikode.

== History ==
The area was formerly known as Kadandam (Malayalam: കടണ്ടം), and over time the name changed to Pazhur. The older name is still used by some local community groups to preserve the area's historical identity.

== Geography ==
Pazhur is located in Kozhikode district in northern Kerala, near the Iruvanjippuzha (also known as the Eruvanjipuzha). It is connected by local roads to nearby towns and settlements.

Munnoor, Chittaripilakkal, Eranjiparamb, Kavungal and Chakkalakunnu are localities within Pazhur. Nearby places include Koolimadu, Pulparambu and Kodiyathur.

Location of Pazhur

== Localities ==
Pazhur includes several localities with residential communities, religious facilities and commercial activities.

- Munnoor – home to the Mahallu Juma Masjid and its associated Muslim cemetery (kabarsthan).
- Kavungal – an area associated with carpentry, woodworking, sawmills and furniture-related businesses.
- Chakkalakunnu – known for commercial flour-milling activities, including the processing and grinding of wheat, rice and other grains.
- Chittaripilakkal – a locality associated with a Civil Supplies ration shop.
- Eranjiparamb – home to Eranjiparamb Bhagavathi Temple, a Hindu temple dedicated to Goddess Bhagavathi.

== Administration ==
Pazhur is administered by the Chathamangalam Gram Panchayat and covers Wards 10 and 11 of the local body. It lies in the Kunnamangalam Legislative Assembly constituency and the Kozhikode Lok Sabha constituency. The postal PIN code is 673661.

Local policing falls under Mavoor Police Station. Judicial matters may come under the Judicial First Class Magistrate Court, Kunnamangalam, subject to territorial jurisdiction.

== Transport ==
Pazhur is connected by local roads to Kozhikode, Mavoor, Mukkam and Edavannappara. The nearest major railway station is Kozhikode railway station, and the nearest airport is Calicut International Airport (Karipur).

The route through Pazhur is sometimes used for travel between the Wayanad region and Calicut International Airport, as well as by some pilgrims heading to Sabarimala, depending on origin and road conditions.

== Pazhur Post Office ==
The Pazhur Post Office is a local postal facility serving Pazhur and the surrounding area. It is associated with PIN code 673661.

== Pazhur Public Library and Reading Room ==
Pazhur Public Library and Reading Room (Malayalam: പാഴൂര്‍ പൊതുജന വായനശാല & ലൈബ്രറി) is a community library and reading facility in Pazhur. It provides access to a collection of books and Malayalam newspapers, serving as a local resource for reading, learning and staying informed about current affairs.

The reading room makes several leading Malayalam-language newspapers available to readers. The library's collection of books offers opportunities for leisure reading and self-directed learning for members of the local community.

== Pazhur Mini Stadium ==
Pazhur Mini Stadium (പാഴൂർ മിനി സ്റ്റേഡിയം)

Pazhur Mini Stadium (Malayalam: പാഴൂർ മിനി സ്റ്റേഡിയം) is a local sports and recreational facility in Pazhur. It is primarily used for playing football and also accommodates cricket, badminton and other sporting activities.

The stadium hosts school sports festivals and various cultural and arts programmes. The complex also includes a mini gymnasium for fitness activities.

== Education ==
- Pazhur AUP School – an aided upper primary school serving the local community.
- Darul Quran Islamic Academy – an Islamic educational institution providing religious education and Islamic learning.

== Arts and sports ==
Pazhur has local arts and sports clubs, including Evershine Arts & Sports Club, Pink and Spandhanam. These clubs are associated with community and recreational activities.

== Charitable organisations and services ==
Charitable organisations and community services in Pazhur include Help & Hope, Care & Love, Sahachari, Sahayi and Pazhur Ambulance Service.

== Local businesses ==
Local businesses in Pazhur include:

- Narangali Restaurant – a restaurant serving local cuisine.
- Bluco Trading – a retailer and wholesaler of electrical supplies, plumbing materials and bathroom fittings.
- Pazhur Timbers & Furnitures – a timber and furniture business in Kavungal, Pazhur.

== 2021 Nipah virus outbreak ==
In September 2021, Pazhur was associated with a Nipah virus outbreak in Kozhikode district. A 12-year-old boy from Pazhur died of the infection on 5 September 2021. Laboratory testing at the National Institute of Virology in Pune confirmed the infection.

Following confirmation of the case, the central government sent a team from the National Centre for Disease Control to assist state authorities. Contact tracing, quarantine measures and surveillance were undertaken to prevent further transmission. The outbreak remained limited to the single confirmed case, which was fatal.

== Gallery ==
Pazhur in 2026

Pazhur in 2024

Pazhur in September 2024

Pazhur in 2004

Pazhur market in 2004

Munnoor in 2009

Pazhur in 2010

== See also ==
- Mavoor
- Chathamangalam
- Kozhikode district
- Iruvanjippuzha
- Chittaripilakkal
