= Thirumarayoor =

Village in Ernakulam District, Kerala, India

Coordinates: 9.858514°N 76.460102°E

Thirumarayoor is a small village situated around 7 km from Piravom in the Ernakulam district of Kerala, India. A sub-post office of Arakunnam (PIN-682313) and a co-operative bank are the only public firms operating here. The main income of people in Thirumarayoor is from agriculture. Rubber, rice and coconut are the main agricultural products.

The name "Thirumarayoor" originated from an event linked with the epic of "Ramayana". When Ravan kidnapped Seetha and went to Lanka in his Pushpaka vimaana, on his way Jattayu tried to stop Ravan. Enraged Ravan sliced off Jattayu's wings . Jattayu who lost his balance fell to the ground with his body continuously rotating in the air. The name "Thirumarayoor" is originated from two Malayalam words " Thirinju Marinju" meaning "getting rotated in several ways" and "Ooru" meaning "place". Hence the name "Thirumarayoor" means "place where the rotation happened". Jattayu lost his balance and rotated in the air and moved through the sky above Thirumarayoor.

- The club Navachetana Kala Samidhi is situated here, and promotes the cultural as well as sports activities in Thirumarayoor and its surrounding areas. The Vadam Vali (Tug of War) is conducted (yearly) by Navachethana Kala Samidhi and is considered as the best entertainment programme in Edakkattuvayal Panchayat area . Another club here is "The Royals Mangidapilly".

== Places of interest ==
- Ramaswamy temple. It is a beautifully sculptured ancient and one of few Rama temples in Kerala. It is situated in a tiny land surrounded by paddy field.
- St Mary's Simhasana Church (2 km), Mar Bahnan Orthodox Syrian Church (2.3 km), St. George Orthodox Syrian Church (0.3 km), St. Thomas Knanaya Catholic Church, (1 km) from Thirumarayoor junction).
- The village is (35 km) from Kochi. Nearby places are Veliyanad and Thottoor.
