= Anoop Jacob =

Indian politician

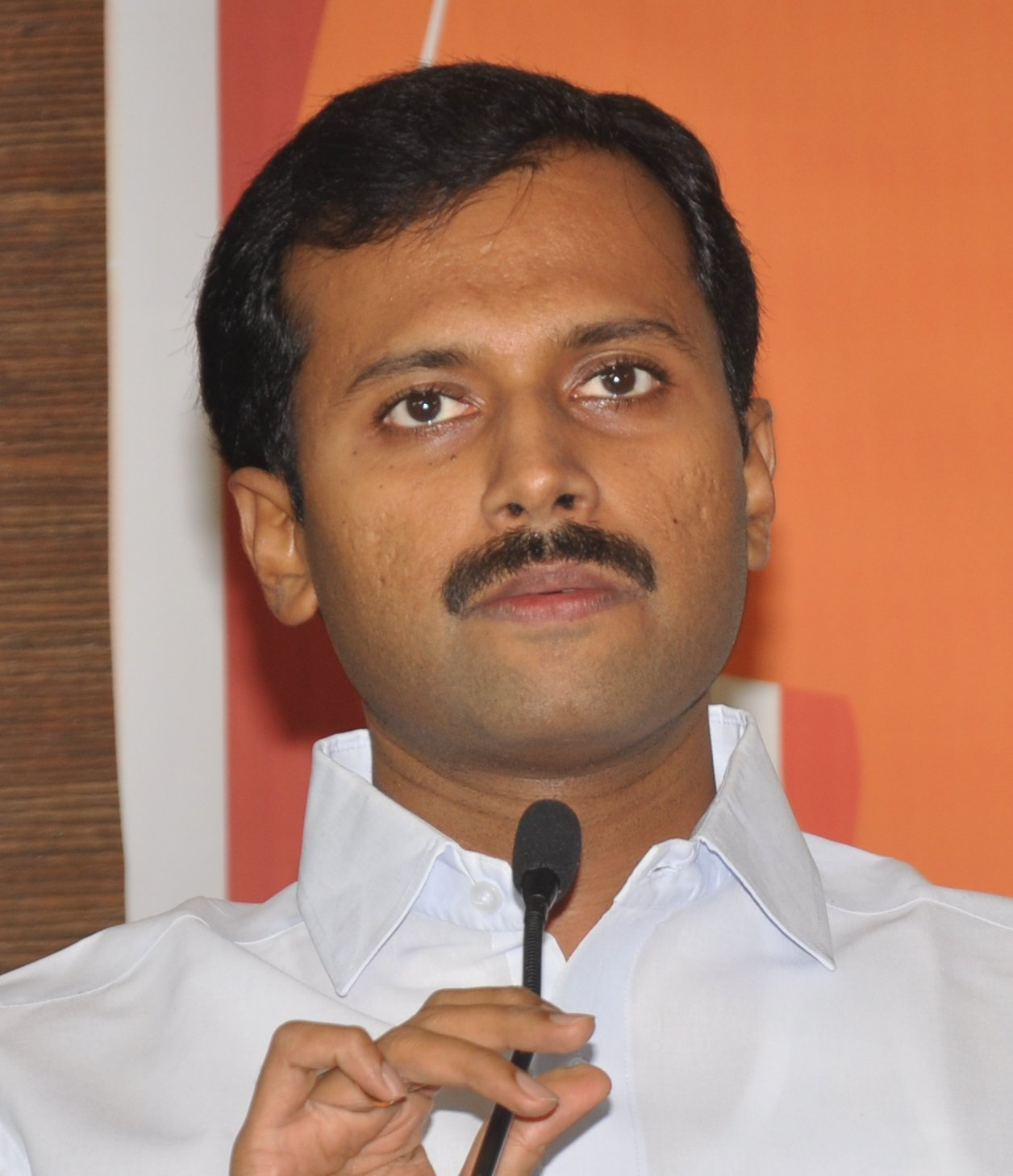

Minister for Food, Civil Supplies and Consumer Affairs, Government of Kerala
- Incumbent
- Assumed office 18 May 2026
- Governor: Rajendra Arlekar
- Chief Minister: V.D. Satheesan
- Portfolio(s): See list: Food & Civil Supplies; Consumer Affairs; Legal Metrology
- Preceded by: G. R. Anil
- In office 12 April 2012 – 20 May 2016
- Chief Minister: Oommen Chandy
- Preceded by: T. M. Jacob
- Succeeded by: P. Thilothaman

Member of the Kerala Legislative Assembly
- Incumbent
- Assumed office 23 March 2012
- Preceded by: T. M. Jacob
- Constituency: Piravom

Personal details
- Born: 16 December 1977 (age 48) Kottayam, Kerala, India
- Party: Kerala Congress (Jacob)
- Spouse: Anila Anoop (m. 2002)
- Children: 2
- Parents: T. M. Jacob; Annie Jacob
- Education: Mar Ivanios College, Thiruvananthapuram; Kerala Law Academy Law College, Thiruvananthapuram

Anoop Jacob (born 16 December 1977) is an Indian politician in the state of Kerala who is currently serving as the Minister for Food and Civil Supplies. He is a Member of the Kerala Legislative Assembly and Legislative Party leader of the Kerala Congress (Jacob), a constituent of the UDF political alliance, since 2012. He is the son of T. M. Jacob who founded the party in 1993.

Anoop represents Piravom Constituency in the Kerala Legislative Assembly. He was elected to the Assembly following a by-election at Piravom in March 2012, which was necessitated due to the demise of his father, the incumbent of the constituency. He was also elected in May 2016. In the 2021 election Anoop was elected from the same constituency with a highest majority.

== Education ==
Anoop Jacob has a degree from Kerala Law Academy Law College, Thiruvananthapuram and is a practising lawyer at the Kerala High Court. Prior to that he completed his bachelor's in English Literature from Mar Ivanios College, Thiruvananthapuram.

== Politics ==
His first foray into politics was as a student at the Mar Ivanios College where he founded a unit of Kerala Students Congress (Jacob) in 1994. In 1997, he was elected as editor of the college union magazine, Prathibha, which won the Malayala Manorama award for the state's best college magazine under his aegis. In 1998, he unsuccessfully contested the post of Chairman of the Mar Ivanios College Union.

Anoop became State President of the Kerala Students Congress (Jacob) in 2001, during which period the party registered its best performance yet by winning seats including General Secretary & Councillor in colleges like Mar Ivanios. In 2008, he was elected as the State President of the Kerala Youth Front (Jacob), the youth wing of the Kerala Congress (Jacob) party.

== Election to Kerala Legislative Assembly ==
Anoop's father, who was the Minister for Food and Civil Supplies, died on 30 October 2011. Following this, Anoop was nominated by the Kerala Congress (Jacob) and UDF to contest from the Piravom assembly seat previously represented by his father. His father had lost the sitting seat in 2006 elections and recaptured it in 2011 election by a margin of 157 votes.

Against Anoop Jacob, CPI(M)–led LDF once again fielded M. J. Jacob, who had won against T. M. Jacob in 2006 and lost in 2011. Since the result of Piravom by-election mattered heavily to the ruling UDF who had a slender margin of 1 seat in the Legislative assembly over LDF, the constituency witnessed intense campaigning from both sides. Election was held on 17 March 2012 and results were announced on 21 March 2012. Anoop Jacob won the by-election by a significant margin of 12,071 votes. He was sworn in as an MLA on 22 March 2012. Anoop took oath as the Minister for Food & Civil Supplies on 12 April 2012 and occupied office in the North Block of the Kerala Secretariat; both portfolio & office last held by his departed father.

Kerala Legislative Assembly Election
Year	Constituency	Closest Rival	Majority (Votes)	Won/Lost
2012*	Piravom	MJ Jacob (CPI(M))	12,071	Won
2016	Piravom	M.J Jacob (CPI(M))	6,1955	Won
2021	Piravom	Sindhumol Jacob (KC(M))	25,364	Won
2026	Piravom	Sabu K Jacbo (KC(M))	44,681	Won

*by-election

== Personal life ==
Anoop Jacob married Anila Geevarghese on 23 May 2002. She is working as Asst. Professor, BPC college, Piravom. They have a son named Jacob (Named after his grandfather) and a daughter named Lira. Apart from politics, he is passionate about reading and poetry.
