= Areekkal Waterfalls =

Waterfalls in Kerala, India

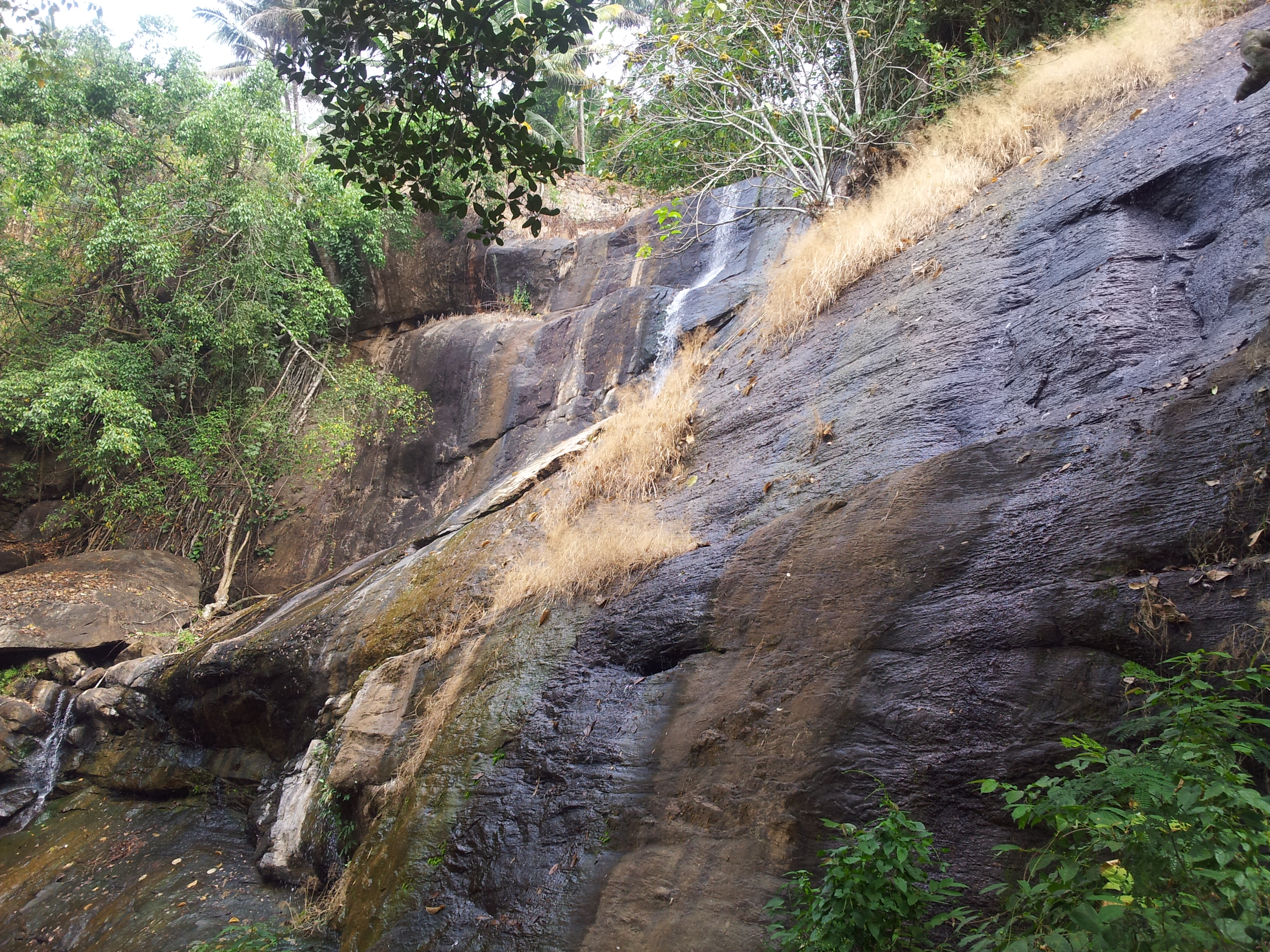
- December 27, 2012
- Interactive map of Areekkal Waterfalls
- Location: Ernakulam district, Kerala, India
- Coordinates: 9°55′6.6″N 76°32′13.8″E
- Longest drop: 100 ft (30 m)

Areekkal Waterfalls is located in Pampakuda around 35 kilometers away from the Ernakulam main city on the Thodupuzha- Ernakulam road.

== Overview ==
Areekkal Waterfalls located in Pampakuda Panchayat of Ernakulam district which was not known much to tourists until earlier. It received attraction in 2014, after the Kerala government launched the Areekkal tourism development project. It is located on the Piramadam-Vettimudu route and is around 100 feet in height with forest and rubber plantations in its background. It is one of the major domestic tourist destination in Pampakuda. The waterfall originates from Mannathur Hills in Tirumaradi Panchayat. It comes down from a height of more than 70 feet over the rocks. It falls on all three levels and there is a barricaded area built below the third level for travelers to access. Other notable places and tourist destinations near Areekkal falls are Kochareekkal caves, Mandalam Mount, Mayeeladam Para, Shoolam waterfall, Pazhur Padipura, Pazhur Perumthrikovil Temple and Piravam Valiya Palli.
