= Padippura =

Padippura or Padipura is a Malayalam word that may refer to:

- Padippura (ml:പടിപ്പുര), a traditional arched gateway (sometimes, without a lockable gate) on a path leading to the main building, in the architecture of Kerala
- Pazhoor Padipura, a place of astrological importance and linked to Pazhoor Perumthrikkovil temple, located near Piravom, Kerala, India
