= Eranchiparamb =

Village in Kerala, India

Eranchiparamb is a small village in Chathamangalam panchayat in Kozhikode district, Kerala, India. It is located near Koolimad.
