= T. M. Jacob =

Indian politician (1950–2011)

Minister for Food and Civil Supplies, Government of Kerala
- In office 18 May 2011 – 30 October 2011
- Preceded by: C. Divakaran
- Succeeded by: Anoop Jacob

Minister for Irrigation, Government of Kerala
- In office 17 May 2001 – 29 August 2004
- Preceded by: V. P. Ramakrishna Pillai
- Succeeded by: Thiruvanchoor Radhakrishnan

Minister for Irrigation and Cultural Affairs, Government of Kerala
- In office 22 March 1995 – 09 May 1996
- Preceded by: Himself
- Succeeded by: Baby John
- In office 29 June 1991 – 16 March 1995
- Preceded by: Baby John
- Succeeded by: Himself

Minister for Education, Government of Kerala
- In office 24 May 1982 – 25 March 1987
- Preceded by: P. J. Joseph
- Succeeded by: K. Chandrasekharan

Personal details
- Born: 16 September 1950 Oliyappuram, Muvattupuzha Taluk, State of Travancore–Cochin (present day Ernakulam, Kerala), India
- Died: 30 October 2011 (aged 61)
- Party: Kerala Congress (Jacob)
- Spouse: Annie Jacob (Daisy)
- Children: 2 (incl. Anoop Jacob)
- Parents: T. S. Mathew; Annamma

Thanikunnel Mathew Jacob (16 September 1950 – 30 October 2011) was an Indian politician and the leader of the Kerala Congress (Jacob). Jacob was the Food & Civil Supplies Minister in the UDF government, which was elected into power in Kerala in 2011.

== Career ==
T. M. Jacob was first elected to the Kerala Legislative Assembly as an MLA from Piravom constituency in Ernakulam district in 1977, and remained a member for a period of over thirty years, representing Piravom and Kothamangalam constituencies. Jacob has served as the Education Minister in the Government of Kerala under K. Karunakaran in the 1980s, and as the Irrigation and Water Supply Minister in the UDF Government under A. K. Antony which was elected into power in 2001. He first became a minister in the K. Karunakaran cabinet which held office from 1982 to 1987 and then subsequently from 1991 to 1995.

His party Kerala Congress (Jacob) faced a split in 2020 after the sitting Chairman Johnny Nellore and his son Anoop Jacob failed to come into a political agreement.

== Personal life ==
Jacob was born into the Thanikunnel family, on 16 September 1950, to T. S. Mathew and Annamma Mathew, as their second son. He was married to Daisy who works as AGM in Federal Bank, Trivandrum. The couple have a son Anoop Jacob and a daughter Ambili. Suffering from various illnesses, he was admitted to Lakeshore Hospital, Kochi on 17 October 2011 and died there on 30 October 2011, following liver failure. He had also been under treatment for pulmonary hypertension. He was interred at the Kakkoor St. Mary's Jacobite church, Piravom. Anoop was elected from Piravom State Assembly Constituency following his father's death, and served as the minister of food & civil supplies in Oommen Chandy ministry. Ambili is working in Technopark Trivandrum.
