= Chinmaya Vishwa Vidyapeeth =

Deemed university in Kerala, India

- Other names: Chinmaya University, CVV
- Motto: Global Mind, Indian Heart
- Type: Deemed University
- Established: 2016
- Founder: Pujya Guruji Swami Tejomayananda
- Academic affiliations: UGC, AICTE, NCTE, AIU
- Chancellor: Swami Swaroopananda
- Vice-Chancellor: Prof. Manoj Kumar Arora
- Location: Adi Sankara Nilayam, Veliyanad P.O.,, Ernakulam, Kerala and Pune, India
- Campus: 100 acres; Rural
- Colors: Midnight Blue
- Website: www.cvv.ac.in

Chinmaya Vishwa Vidyapeeth (CVV), commonly known as Chinmaya University or CVV, is the first deemed university in the 'de novo' category in Kerala, recognised by the University Grants Commission. Established in 2016 during the centenary year of Swami Chinmayananda. With its headquarters located at Veliyanad (near Piravom), the maternal home of Adi Shankara, in Ernakulam District, Kerala, the university has two campuses – in Ernakulam and Kolwan, Pune.The headquarters of the university are situated at the maternal home of Adi Shankara at Veliyanad, (near Piravom) Ernakulam District, Kerala, India.

The university offers a diverse range of courses with both common streams and distinctive electives, as well as supplementary subjects. These programs include over 20 options at the undergraduate, postgraduate, integrated, and doctoral levels that are equipped with traditional and contemporary knowledge and resources in the streams of engineering, commerce, management, psychology, Sanskrit, and education (English and Mathematics).

== Affiliations ==
Chinmaya Vishwa Vidyapeeth (CVV) is recognised by the University Grants Commission (UGC), its engineering and management programmes are approved by the All India Council for Technical Education(AICTE), and education programmes by the National Council for Teacher Education (NCTE). CVV is also an active member of the Association of Indian Universities (AIU).

== History ==
The University Grants Commission (UGC) declared the institution as "deemed to be university" under Section 3 of the UGC Act, 1956 with its headquarters in Veliyanad and off-campus in Pune, Maharashtra.

=== Schools at CVV ===
The schools of Chinmaya Vishwa Vidyapeeth are:

- School of Vedic Knowledge Systems (VKS)
- School of Philosophy, Psychology and Scientific Heritage (PPSH)
- School of Contemporary Knowledge Systems (CKS)
- School of Ethics, Governance, Culture and Social Systems (EGCS)
- School of Linguistics and Literary Studies (LLS)
- School of Kalayoga
- Institute of Science and Technology (CVV-IST)

The above-mentioned schools offer undergraduate programmes and doctoral programmes (Ph.D.).

=== Chinmaya Institute of Science and Technology ===
CVV Institute of Science and Technology, launched in June 2023 is a new venture of the university. It offers an MBA programme and B.Tech. programmes in Computer Science, Data Sciences, Artificial Intelligence & Machine Learning, Electronics Engineering, and Mechanical Engineering. The CVV-IST is located in the Onakkoor facility of the university's Ernakulam campus.

== Campuses ==
Chinmaya Vishwa Vidyapeeth (CVV) functions from three campuses:

=== Chinmaya Eswar Gurukula (CEG) ===
Chinmaya Eswar Gurukula campus is housed in the maternal birth home of Sri Adi Sankaracharya. The headquarters at CEG campus at Veliyanad Kochi, Kerala is situated 47 km from Kochi International Airport and 28 km from Ernakulam South Railway Station. It has three facilities:

- Veliyanad [Headquarters]
- Warriam Road Facility
- Onakkoor Facility

=== Chinmaya Naada Bindu Gurukula (CNBG) ===
The Chinmaya Naada Bindu Gurukula (CNBG) campus is near the foothills of the Sahyadri mountain range in Kolwan, near Pune around 50 km from Pune Airport and 45 km from Pune Railway Station. It offers students the opportunity to learn in the traditional Gurukula environment while working towards a university degree in their chosen field of performing arts.

=== Chinmaya VishwaVidyapeeth LVP Campus (CVV-LVP) ===
CVV-LVP is the latest campus of Chinmaya Vishwavidyapeeth. The Campus is located near Onakkoor in the town of Piravom, around 30 km from the Vyttila Hub and 14 km from Velloor Railway Station. The Campus offers a large variety of Courses including MBA Programmes, B.Tech, BBA, B.Ed,B.Com and B.Sc Programmes. The Onakkoor facility sits on 80-acre facility in the middle of small hills.

== See also ==
- List of Sanskrit universities in India
- Sanskrit revival
