= Onakkoor =

- Village
- Location in Kerala, India Onakkoor (India)
- Coordinates: 9.893931°N 76.514162°E
- Country: India
- State: Kerala
- District: Ernakulam

Population (2011)
  - Total: 12,421

Languages
  - Official: Malayalam, English
- Time zone: UTC+5:30 (IST)
- PIN: 686667
- Telephone code: 485227
- Nearest city: Piravom
- Literacy: 100%
- Climate: Cool, Humid

Onakkoor is a village in Ernakulam district in the Indian state of Kerala. The main attractions in the village are Onakkoor River and Onakkoor Temple. Other attractions include Edayan Lake and Onakkoor check dam (Ooranattu chera). Famous writer George Onakkoor is associated with this village. The SH-42 Highway passes through Onakkoor. Piravom is the nearest town with markets and hospitals. The dominant religions are Hinduism and Christianity.

Onakkoor is a part of Pambakuda Grama Panchayat and is situated in Muvattupuzha Taluk.

== Worship Places ==
=== Hinduism ===
1. Onakkoor temple (Onakkoor devi temple)
2. Kalarickal temple (Kalarickal paradevatha temple)
3. Shasthankal temple (Puthen Sabarimala sree dharmashasthaa temple)
4. Pandianpara temple (Pandianpara bhadrakali temple)

=== Christianity ===
1. Onakkoor Valiyapally-St Marys Orthodox church - Located at onakkoor Pallippady(First church of Onakkoor)
2. St.Ignatius Sehion Orthodox Syrian Church Onakkoor
3. St. Mary's Malankara Catholic Church
4. St. George Orthodox Chapel
5. Onakkoor Sehiyon Jacobite Syrian church

== Transportation ==
1. Bus Terminal (Private & Public) is available at around 5 km away at Piravom.
2. Nearest railway station is Piravom Road railway station, at Velloor.
3. Nearest airport is Cochin International Airport at Nedumbaserry

== Demographics ==
As of 2011 India census, Onakkoor had a population of 12,421 with 6,203 males and 6,218 females.
