= Kerala Congress (Jacob) =

- Abbreviation: KEC(J)
- Leader: Anoop Jacob
- Chairperson: Vakkanad Radhakrishnan
- Founder: T. M. Jacob
- Founded: 16 December 1993; 32 years ago
- Split from: Kerala Congress (M)
- Headquarters: Central Committee Office, T. B. Road, Kottayam, Kerala
- Ideology: Secularism; Socialism; Democracy
- ECI status: Registered Party
- Alliance: UDF
- Seats in Kerala Legislative Assembly: 1 / 140

Election symbol
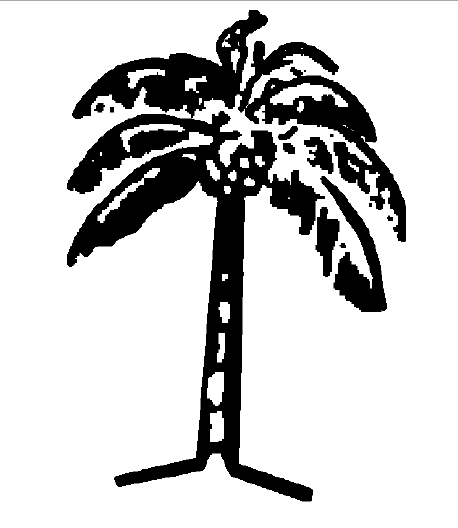

Kerala Congress (Jacob) is a regional political party in the Indian state of Kerala. It is a faction of Kerala Congress founded by the former minister the late T. M. Jacob who has held portfolios like Education, Irrigation, Culture and Civil Supplies in the Kerala Legislative Assembly.

== Formation ==
The Kerala Congress (Jacob) faction was born in 1993 when T. M. Jacob and his supporting MLAs – Johnny Nellore, Mathew Stephen and P. M. Mathew – decided to split from the Kerala Congress (M) party led by former Minister K. M. Mani following difference of opinion. P. M. Mathew and Mathew Stephen later returned to their former party, Kerala Congress (M).

Kerala Congress (Jacob) has its strongholds in the eastern part of Ernakulam district, such as Piravom, Kothamangalam and Kuthattukulam, and in certain areas in the Alappuzha, and Trivandrum districts.

Johny Nellore and a few members left the party on March 7, 2020 and joined the Joseph group.After Johnny Nellore's exit, Vakkanad Radhakrishnan was elected as the new Chairman of Kerala Congress (J) in the party meeting that was held on June 26, 2020 at Kottayam.

== History ==
From its inception on 16 December 1993, Kerala Congress (Jacob) was an alliance member of the Indian National Congress-led United Democratic Front (India) (UDF). In 2005, K.C.(Jacob) left the UDF following differences with the new Chief Minister, Oommen Chandy, and dissolved into the newly formed Democratic Indira Congress (Karunakaran) party led by former Chief Minister K. Karunakaran.

DIC (Karunakaran) had been widely expected to forge an alliance with LDF for the 2006 assembly elections but instead it entered into an understanding with UDF. Both T. M. Jacob and Nellore lost in the elections, from Piravom and Muvattupuzha constituencies respectively.

In September 2006, following differences with the party President K. Muraleedharan, son of K. Karunakaran, T. M. Jacob and his supporters split from DIC(Karunakaran) and revived the Kerala Congress (Jacob) party. They were welcomed back by the Congress-led UDF after a period of hesitation.

In 2011, Kerala Legislative Assembly elections, T. M. Jacob reclaimed his MLA status from Piravom by defeating M. J. Jacob of the LDF. However, the party's other candidate, Nellore, lost the election in the Angamaly constituency to Jose Thettayil of the LDF. T. M. Jacob became a minister in the newly elected UDF Ministry led by Oommen Chandy, handling the Food & Civil Supplies portfolio.

T. M. Jacob died on 30 October 2011. Following this, his son, Anoop Jacob, who had been State President of Kerala Youth Front (Jacob), was nominated by the party and UDF to contest the Piravom assembly seat, earlier represented by his father. He won the by-election by a margin of 12070 votes, defeating M. J. Jacob. The results were out on 21 March 2012. UDF has announced that Anoop will be made a Cabinet Minister.

== Kerala Assembly elections ==
The following are the constituencies KC(Jacob) contested as part of United Democratic Front in the 1996, 2001, 2006, 2011 Kerala Assembly elections and the 2012 by-election.

- 1996
  - Piravom – T. M. Jacob (won)
  - Muvattupuzha – Johnny Nellore (won)
  - Kaduthuruthy – P. M. Mathew (lost)
  - Peermade – Mathew Stephen (lost)
- 2001
  - Piravom – T. M. Jacob (won)
  - Muvattupuzha – Johnny Nellore (won)
  - Kuttanad – Prof. Oommen Mathew (lost)
  - Udumbanchola – Mathew Stephen (lost)
- 2011
  - Piravom – T. M. Jacob (won)
  - Angamaly – Johnny Nellore (lost)
  - Tarur – N. Vineesh (lost)
- 2012
  - Piravom – Anoop Jacob (won)
- 2016
  - Piravom – Anoop Jacob (won)
- 2021
  - Piravom – Anoop Jacob (won)
- 2026
  - Piravom – Anoop Jacob (won)

Kerala Legislative Assembly election results
| Election Year | Alliance | Seats contested | Seats won | Total Votes | Percentage of votes | +/- Vote |
|---|---|---|---|---|---|---|
| 2026 | UDF | 1 | 1 / 140 | 89,551 | 0.41% | ▲0.01% |
| 2021 | UDF | 1 | 1 / 140 | 85,056 | 0.41% | ▲0.05% |
| 2016 | UDF | 1 | 1 / 140 | 73,770 | 0.36% | ▼0.55% |
| 2011 | UDF | 3 | 1 / 140 | 159,252 | 0.91% | ▼0.06% |
| 2001 | UDF | 3 | 2 / 140 | 151,966 | 0.97% | ▼0.17% |
| 1996 | UDF | 4 | 2 / 140 | 162,114 | 1.14% | New |

== Kerala Government ==
Anoop Jacob – Minister for Food and Civil Supplies, Consumer Affairs and Registration

The following are the party nominees to head various boards and corporations under the State Government's control.

- Johnny Nellore – Chairman, Pharmaceutical Corporation Kerala Ltd (Oushadhi)
- Vakkanad Radhakrishnan – Chairman, Quilon Co-operative Spinning Mills Ltd
- C.Mohanan Pillai – Chairman, State Farming Corporation of Kerala Ltd (SFCK)
