= Chittaripilakkal =

Village in Kozhikode district of Kerala, India

Chittaripilakkal pilakkal
- village
- Location in Kerala, India Chittaripilakkal (India)
- Coordinates: 11°16′0″N 76°0′0″E
- Country: India
- State: Kerala
- District: Kozhikode

Languages
  - Official: Malayalam, English
- Time zone: UTC+5:30 (IST)
- PIN: 673661
- Telephone code: 0495
- Vehicle registration: KL-57
- Nearest city: Mukkom, Mavoor
- Literacy: 95%
- Lok Sabha constituency: Kozhikode
- Climate: Tropical monsoon (Köppen)
- Avg. summer temperature: 35 °C (95 °F)
- Avg. winter temperature: 20 °C (68 °F)
- Website: www.facebook.com/chittaripilakkal

Chittripilakkal is a village in the Kozhikode district of Kerala, India. It was known for timber, rice and cattle business and exchange, located 25 kilometres east of Kozhikode and 2 kilometres from Koolimadu. It is located nearby two rivers namely Chaliyar and Eruvazhinchi puzha and kurumbarakkunn. It is in the centre of Koolimad Kalanthod road.

== Climate ==
Chittaripilakkal has a humid and hot climate extending from March to May. The rain starts from June, lasting up to October. The North East Monsoon extends from the second half of October through November. The average annual rainfall is 3313 mm. The highest temperature recorded was 39.4 °C in March 1975. The lowest was 14 °C recorded on 26 December 1975.

== People ==
The centuries of trade across the Indian Ocean gave Kozhikode a cosmopolitan population. Muslims constitute the majority of the population, followed by Hindus and Christians respectively. The Muslims of Kozhikode District are known as Mappilas. A great majority of them are Sunnis following the Shafi School of thought.

== Places of interest ==
The temples and mosques of this village contain sculptures and inscriptions which are of considerable interest to the students of art.

== Transportation ==
Chittaripilakkal village connects to other parts of India through Calicut city on the west and Thamarassery town on the east. National highway No.66 passes through Kozhikode and the northern stretch connects to Mangalore, Goa and Mumbai. The southern stretch connects to Cochin and Trivandrum. The eastern National Highway No.54 going through Adivaram connects to Kalpetta, Mysore and Bangalore. The nearest airports are at Kannur and Kozhikode. The nearest railway station is at Kozhikode.
