= George Onakkoor =

Indian novelist (born 1941)

Dr. George Onakkoor
- Born: 16 November 1941 (age 84); Onakkoor, Muvattupuzha, Kingdom of Cochin
- Occupations: Novelist, short story writer
- Spouse: Valsa George
- Writing career
- Pen name: Onakkoor
- Language: Malayalam, English
- Genres: Novel, short story
- Subject: Social aspects
- Notable awards: Kerala Sahitya Academy Award, K.M. George Sapthathi Award, The Film Critics Award, Jawaharlal Nehru Award, Kesava Dev Centenary Memorial Award, Thakazhi Sahithya Award, C. Achutha Menon Award, Mother Teresa Award, KCBC Award, Kerala Shree Award, SBT Suvarna Mudra etc.

George Onakkoor (born 16 November 1941, Travancore) is an Indian novelist who writes in Malayalam language. He was a Malayalam professor for over three decades at Mar Ivanios College, Trivandrum, Kerala.

Onakkoor is a novelist, short-storywriter, critic, script and travel writer. He was the former director of Kerala State Institute of Children's Literature, State Institute of Encyclopaedic Publications and Kerala State Literacy Council. He also served as the first non-official chairman of the State Resource Centre.

The awards he received include The Jawaharlal Nehru Award for his service as chief editor of the Children's Encyclopaedia; the award for the best research thesis submitted in Indian Universities in the field of Art and Literature, the Kesava Dev Centenary Memorial Award, Thakazhi Sahithya Award, C. Achutha Menon Award, Mother Teresa Award, KCBC Award, Kerala Shree Award, Kesava Dev Award etc. He is also the recipient of the prestigious SBT 'Suvarna Mudra'. He has been honoured by the Government of Kerala for his contributions to Language and Literature. The Award for the outstanding Indian writer given by the Euro-American Expatriate Literary Association was yet another laurels he received. The Kerala Sahithya Academy Award has been conferred on Onakkoor twice for his novel (Illam in 1980) and travelogue (Adarunna Akaasham in 2005).

His writings include Akale Akasham, Uzhavuchalukal, Ulkkadal, Illam, Kalthamara, Kamana, Ezhuthapurangal, Samathalangalkkappuram, Hridayathiloru Vaal, Parvathangalile Kaattu, Pranaya Thazhavarayile Devadaru, Yordan Ozhukunnathu Evidekku (Novels), Orchid, Kamana, The Sword in the Soul, The Wind in the Mountains, The Sea Within (Translations of his five novels), and Ivar Enikku Arayirunnu? (Memoirs).

== Personal details ==
- Father: Late Naduviledathu Kuriakose
- Mother: Late Mariamma
- Spouse: Valsa George
- Children: three

== Education ==
B.A. in economics, University of Kerala, 1962 (Nirmala College, Muvattupuzha)

M.A. in Malayalam language & literature, University of Kerala, 1964 (St.Berchmans College, Changanasserry)

M.Phil. in Malayalam, University of Kerala, 1978 (Kerala University Centre)

Ph.D. from University of Kerala, 1983

Subject: 'The Concept of Hero in Malayalam Novel'

== Student career ==
Chairman, Literary Association, Nirmala College, Muvattupuzha: 1961 & 1962 Magazine Editor, St. Berchmans College, Changanacherry: 1963 Arts Club Secretary, St. Berchmans College, Changanacherry: 1964 First Prize, Inter-Collegiate Debating Competition for Godavarma Trophy: 1963 First Prize, Inter-Collegiate Debating Competitions for Sree Narayana Trophy: 1963 & 1964

== Publications, literary ==
Literary Critic and Novelist. Author of fifty-two books.

1. Akale Akasam (Novel)- 1972
2. Oolkadal (Novel)- 1975
3. The Sea Within (English translation) - 2013
4. Kalthamara (Novel) - 1977
5. Orchid (English translation) - 1978
6. Ezhuthappurangal (Novel) - 1978
7. Illam (Novel) - 1979
8. Kamana (Novel) - 1981
9. Kamana (English edition) - 1981
10. Uzhavuchalukal (Novel) - 1985
11. Nalu Poochakkuttikal (Stories) - 1985
12. Njan Kathirikkunnu (Novel) - 1986
13. Njan Oru Kaioppu Matram (Stories) - 1988
14. Rachanayude Rahasyam (Children's Literature) - 1989
15. Thapovanathile Sooryan (Children's Literature) - 1989
16. The Sun of the Hermitage (English Translation) - 2003
17. Olivumarangalude Nattil (Travelogue) - 1989
18. Marubhumiyude Hridayam Thedi (Travelogue) - 1990
19. Maria Goretti (Children's Literature) - 1991
20. Mahatma Gandhi (Biography) - 1994
21. M. P. Paul, Kalapathinte Thiruseshippukal (Biography) - 1994
22. Nadu Neengunna Neram (Stories) - 1995
23. Samathalangalkkappuram (Novel) - 1996
24. Arshajnanathinte Pravachakan (Biography) - 1999
25. The Prophet of Ascetic Wisdom (English Translation) - 2003
26. Puthiya Sahasrabdham : Samasyakal (Study) - 2002
27. Adarunna Akasam (Travelogue) - 2003
28. Samaya Soochikal Nischalam (Stories) - 2005
29. Hrudayathil Oru Wal (Novel) - 2005
30. The Sword in the Soul (English Translation) - 2007
31. Rachanayude Nervazhi (Children's Literature) - 2006
32. Kuttikalude Sampoorna Bible (Children's Literature) - 2007
33. Parvathangalile Kaattu (Novel) - 2007
34. The Wind in the Mountains (English Translation) - 2008
35. Ente Sanchara Kathakal (Stories) - 2009
36. Pranaya Kathakal (Stories) - 2009
37. Manalkkattinte Sabdam (Biography) - 2010
38. Ivar Enikku Aaraayirunnu (Memories) - 2010
39. Kathakal - Onakkoor (Collection of Stories) - 2010
40. Pranaya Thazhvarayile Devadaru (Novel) - 2012
41. Yordan Ozhukunnathu Evidekku (Novel) - 2013
42. Akasathinte – Adarukal (Travelogue) - 2014
43. Akasa Oonjal (Novel) - 2016
44. Pranayathinte Kanal Vazhikal (Stories) - 2018
45. Hrudayaragangal (Autobiography) - 2018
46. Bhoomiyude Spandanam (Novel) - 2020

== Publications, academic ==
1. Kerala Bhasha Ganga (Literary Criticism) - 1963
2. Yuga Prathibha (Literary Criticism) - 1963
3. Sahitya Sameepanam (Literary Criticism) - 1968
4. Ithihasa Pushpangal (Literary Criticism) - 1969
5. Nayakasankalpam Malayala Novelil (Thesis) - 1986
6. Kalathinte Thiricharivukal (Essays)- 2011

== Cinema ==
•Contributed, story, screenplay and dialogue for nine feature films in Malayalam:

1. Aradhana
2. Ente Neelakasam
3. Leyam
4. Katha Parayum Kayal
5. Johny
6. Kaithappoo
7. Oolkatal
8. Kilikonchal
9. Yamanam

• Contributed script for twelve documentary films.

• The film Oolkatal won a number of awards in 1979.

• The film Yamanam won the Indira Gandhi Award for the best thematic content.

== Radio and television ==
- Has given a number of talks through All India Radio.
- Participated as an actor in the radio plays broadcast from All India Radio, Thiruvananthapuram.
- Conducted a literary quiz and cultural discussions on Doordarshan, Asianet, Surya TV, Kairali TV, Jeevan TV, Amrita TV, and Jaihind TV.
- Contributed script for the Doordarshan TV serials Illam and Kalthamara

== Awards ==
1. The novel ‘Illam’ won the Kerala Sahitya Academy Award in 1980 for the Best Novel written during the period from 1977 to 1979.
2. The novel ‘Kamana’ won the Mar Ivanios Cultural Award in 1984.
3. The Ph.D. thesis ‘Nayakasankalpam Malayala Novelil’ won the first K.M. George Sapthathi Award for the best thesis produced in Indian Universities on Language, Literature and Culture during the period from 1980 to 1985.
4. The Film Critics Award for the Best Story Writer in 1991, for the film ‘Yamanam’ based on the novel ‘Kamana’. The film ‘Yamanam’ won the National Award for the Best Social Theme in 1992.
5. Honoured with Jawaharlal Nehru Award, instituted by the Mathrubhumi Study Circle, for the outstanding contributions to Children's Literature in 1993.
6. ‘Akale Akasam’ and ‘Illam’ were prescribed as textbooks for the Degree Course of the University of Kerala.
7. ‘Orchid’—the translation of the novel ‘Kalthamara’—was prescribed as a textbook in the Clerk Atlanta University, Georgia, U.S.A.
8. ‘M. P. Paul: Kalapathinte Thiruseshippukal’ won the Sahodaran Ayyappan Award for the best Biography in 1996.
9. The biography ‘Arshajnanathinte Pravachakan’ won the Delhi Malankara Association Bi-Decennial Literary Award in 1999.
10. Darsana Award for the outstanding contribution to the field of culture in 2000.
11. Milan Award (Michigan Malayalee Literary Association of North America Award) for the unique contribution to Art, Literature and Culture in 2002
12. Kesava Dev Birth Centenary Award for the total contribution to the Malayalam Novel in 2003
13. The travelogue “Adarunna Akasam” won the Kerala Sahitya Academy Award in 2005
14. First Euro-American Pravasi Award for the outstanding Indian Writer in 2005
15. ‘STATE HONOUR’ by the Govt. of Kerala for the Distinguished Contribution to Language & Literature (2005)
16. The Novel ‘Hrudayathil Oru Wal’ won the K.C.B.C. Award, the prestigious Thakazhi Award and Kerala Sree Award (2006)
17. ‘Sukrutham’ Award for literature (2008)
18. The Novel ‘Parvathangalile Kaattu’ won the Mother Teresa Award (2008) and P. Kesava Dev Award (2009)
19. C. Achutha Menon Award for the total contribution to culture (2010)
20. Gandhi Darshan Award for Literature (2011)
21. SBT ‘Suvarna Mudra’ for the total contribution to language, literature & culture.
22. Honoured by the Indian Media Forum (IMF), Dubai on the 50th Year of Creative Writing
23. Honoured by Thiruvananthapuram Public Library on the 50th Year of Creative Writing in 2013
24. Honoured by Dubai Art and Literary Association in 2013
25. Goodness Excellence Award for the total contribution to Literature in 2014
26. ‘Champaran Thozhilali Prakshobha Smaraka’ Puraskaram (2016)
27. ‘Akshayasree’ Award for literature (2017)
28. ‘G. Gopinathan Nair Smruthi Puraskaram for literature (2017)
29. Ettumanoor Somadasan Award for literature (2017)
30. Kerala Sahrudaya Vedi Award (2019)
31. Kaduvayil Thangal Charitable Trust Award (2019)
32. Kendra Sahitya Academy Award for Hrudayaragangal (Autobiography) in 2021

== Editing and publishing experience ==
1. Editor-in -chief and director of the publications of the State Institute of Children’s Literature including the ‘Bala Kairali Vijnanakosam’ (Children's illustrated multicolour Encyclopaedia in 7 vols.) and ‘Akshara Kairali’ series.
2. Editor-in -chief and director of ‘Sarva Vijnana Kosam’ (General Encyclopaedia in 20 vols.) & ‘Viswa Sahitya Vijnanakosam’ (Encyclopaedia of World Literature in 10 vols.)
3. Editor-in -chief of Fifty Supplementary Readers for Neo-Literates.
4. Edited the book ‘Ayyappa Panicker: Vyakthiyum Kaviyum’.
5. Edited the book ‘The Speeches of C. H. Mohammed Koya in the Kerala Legislative Assembly’.
6. Edited the book ‘The Speeches of Joseph Mundasseri in the Kerala Legislative Assembly’.
7. Sub-editor of ‘Deepika’ Malayalam Daily for two months
8. Honorary editor of 'Grandhalokam,'
9. Organ of the Kerala Grandhasala Sanghom for three years
10. Member of the editorial board of the 'Sahityalokam'
11. Organ of the Kerala Sahitya Academy for eight years
12. Chief editor of the 'S.I.C.L. News' for four years
13. Chief editor, NBS Bulletin for five years
14. Hon. editor, Kilippattu magazine

== Administrative experience ==
- Chairman, State Resource Centre, Kerala: 3 years
- Director, The State Institute of Encyclopaedic Publications: 2 years
- Director, The Kerala Saksharatha Samithi: 2 years
- Director, The State Institute of Children's Literature: 5 years
- Head of the Department of Malayalam, Mar Ivanios College, Thiruvananthapuram: 29 years
- Member, director board and executive committee of SPCS (Sahithya Pravarthaka Co-operative Society), Kottayam: 3 years
- Member, managing committee, Kerala Sahitya Academy: 2 years
- Member, managing committee, 'Thonnackal Asan Smarakam':3 years
- Chairman, SPCS publication committee: 5 years
- President, Kerala Film Critics Association

== Positions in academic, cultural bodies ==
1. Member of the Kerala Sahitya Academy General Council and finance committee from 1974 to 1977 and from 1981 to 1984 and member of the managing committee from 1984 to 1986
2. Member of the Kerala University Senate from 1984 to 1988 (Government nominee representing the authors)
3. Member of the Board of Studies in Malayalam, Gandhiji University, Kottayam from 1984 to 1987
4. Member of the Board of Studies in Malayalam, University of Kerala from 1984 to 1990
5. Member of the advisory board of the Correspondence Course, University of Kerala from 1977 to 1981
6. Member of the advisory board, Department of Publications, University of Kerala from 1985 to 1988
7. Member of the director board and executive committee of the Sahithya Pravarthaka Co-operative Society from 1980 to 1983
8. Member of the advisory panel of the Regional Film Censor Board from 1984 to 1989 and from 2008 to 2012
9. Member of the 'Thonnackal Asan Smarakam' from 1985 to 1988
10. Member of the School Syllabus Reforms Committee in 1983
11. Member of the school library committee from 1983 to 1988
12. Member of the Thiruvananthapuram Public Library committee from 1982 to 1986 and 2011 onwards
13. Member of the Media Committee, Kerala Saksharatha Samithi from 1991 to 1993
14. Former member of Kerala State Pre-primary Education Advisory Board
15. Former member of the Language Committee, Bharatiya Jnanapith Award
16. Former chairman of the Publication Committee, Sahithya Pravarthaka Co-operative Society
17. Former member of the Senate – CUSAT (Cochin University of Science & Technology) from 2007 onwards (nominated by the chancellor of the university – Governor – State of Kerala, representing the authors)
18. Former member of the Raja Ram Mohun Roy Library Foundation of India
19. Member of the judging committee for State Award, Professional Dramas
20. Chairman of the State Award Committee for the Best Book on Cinema
21. Member of the National Executive of Encyclopaedia Makers
22. Member of the language advisory committee of the Encyclopaedic Publications, Govt. of Kerala
23. Member of the selection committee for Sponsored Programmes, Doordarshan
24. Member of the script selection committee of the National Film Development Corporation
25. Member of the Swadeshabhimani Memorial Trust
26. Member of the Ayappa Paniker Foundation
27. Member of the programme advisory committee, Prasar Bharathi
28. Member of the Educational Core Commission, Govt. of Kerala
29. Member of the Official Language Commission, Govt. of Kerala
30. Member, advisory board of the Thunchathu Ezhuthachan Malayalam University
31. Expert member of the State School Curriculum
32. President of the C.V. Raman Pillai National Foundation
33. President of the P. Kesavadev Foundation
34. President of 'Margi', Centre of Classical Art Forms
35. President, Mahakavi Mulur Foundation
36. President, Kerala Film Critics Association
37. Patron, Institution of Librarians and Information Scientists

== Teaching experience ==
- Total 33 years of teaching at college level

== Research experience ==
- Research guide, University of Kerala from 1984 onwards. Ph.D.s produced: 15

== Other activities ==
1. Represented the Kerala University in the All India University Teachers Conference on National Integration held at Madurai in 1971.
2. Presided over the All India Seminar on Children's Literature held at Bangalore in 1989.
3. Presented papers at the All India Seminar on Children's Literature held at Thiruvananthapuram in 1984; New Delhi in 1989 and in 1990; Hyderabad in 1990 and Ahmedabad in 1991.
4. Presented papers in Ulloor, Asan and Ezhuthachan Seminars organized by the Department of Malayalam, University of Kerala.
5. Convenor of the All India University Teachers and Students Seminar held at Thiruvananthapuram in 1971.
6. Convenor of the All India University Youth Festival held at Thiruvananthapuram in 1972.
7. Director of the Literary workshops organized by the Kerala University Union four times.
8. Director of the Literary Camp organized by the Kerala Sahitya Academy, at Thiruvananthapuram in 1981.
9. Member of Cultural Delegation of the Kerala Sahitya Academy, visited the State of Gujarat in 1977.
10. Member of the committee to adjudge the First, Third and Fourth Prem Nazir Award; First Swadeshabhimani Award; Abudhabi Malayalee Samajam Award; Sahitya Academy Award, etc.
11. Participated as Guest of Honour in the Fourth International Literary Convention organized by the Literary Association, North America at Toronto, Canada in 2002.
12. Participated as Guest of Honour in the First Euro-American International Literary Conference held at Cologne, Germany in 2005.
13. Participated as Guest of Honour in the Annual meeting of 'Sruthi', New Castle, U.K. in 2009.

== Ulkkadal ==
In this novel, Rahulan, the protagonist, is a romantic and poet. The novel unveils as he reaches the city from his village and joins college for his PG. The loner Rahulan becomes friends with Davis and Jayasahankar. As the friendship grows, Rahulan also gets close with Reena, Davis's sister. Romance unfolds and it was only natural that Reena, the budding painter and Rahulan the poet were attracted to each other. But both brother – who had also found love in Susanna – and sister are wary about the profound presence of an orthodox father, James who will never approve his children finding soulmates outside their religion. Remember the Novel is set in 1970s Kerala where religion and caste boundaries were sacrosanct.

The sudden twist in the story comes as fate becomes villain and Davis dies in a Motorbike accident leaving his sweetheart, Susanna astray. Rahulan gets a job as college lecturer and his heart still longs for Reena. James who could not bear the death of his only son turns a heart patient and Rahulan is forced to leave behind his unfulfilled love. Later Rahulan is nursing his broken heart and living a life in despair.

Enter Meera, the student who falls in love with her lecturer. She uses her cunningness and outspoken nature to get him close and in very less time their romance becomes the talk of the town.

But Rahulan meets Susanna again, but this time as Prof Paul's daughter-in-law. Rahulan learns of Susanna's brother's wedding plans with none other than Reena.

Rahulan gets engaged to Meera. There is little he could do as he lets himself to be a puppet in fate's hands. As he reaches home form his engagement he is surprised to see Reena who has come to him leaving behind her home. Rahulan is caught between his love for Reena and engagement to Meera. The Novel reaches climax as Meera's father encounters Rahulan and Reena together, leaves the scene calling off the engagement. Rahulan wastes no time and welcomes Reena into his life.

The novel was adapted into a movie with the same name and won accolades as the first ever movie in India fully based out of college campus. Ulkadal was the trend setter for a series of campus movies, a genre successfully explored by many film makers later in Indian cinema.
