= Pampakuda =

Village in Kerala, India

- Small Town
- Location in Kerala, India Pampakuda (India)
- Coordinates: 9.92°N 76.52°E
- Country: India
- State: Kerala
- District: Ernakulam

Languages
  - Official: Malayalam, English
- Time zone: UTC+5:30 (IST)
- Telephone code: 0485
- Vehicle registration: KL-17
- Nearest city: Kochi, piravom

Pampakuda is a village and Panchayath part of Muvattupuzha Taluk. It lies between Muvattupuzha and Piravom towns. The village is on Highlands and consists of Rubber Plantations. Pampakuda is 10 km from Muvattupuzha. The Areekkal Waterfalls is situated here.

Pampakuda is known for two famous churches of the Malankara Orthodox Church, Pampakuda Valiyapally (St. John of Ephesus Orthodox Church) and Pampakuda Cheriyapally (St. Thomas Orthodox Church). Tomb of the First Catholicose (Murimattathil Bava) of Malankara Orthodox Church was in Pampakuda Cheriyapally. Within the town, there are also 4 chapels and 3 kurisupallis (crosses) belonging to the Malankara Orthodox Syrian Church. There are also other churches including CSI, Pentecostal(AG, IPC etc.), marthoma etc.

The village is famous for contributing the Malankara Malpans of the Malankara Orthodox Syrian Church from Konattu Family, with the current being Malankara Malpan Konattu Dr. Johns Abraham Arch Chor-Episcopa.
