= St. Mary's Orthodox Syrian Cathedral, Piravom =

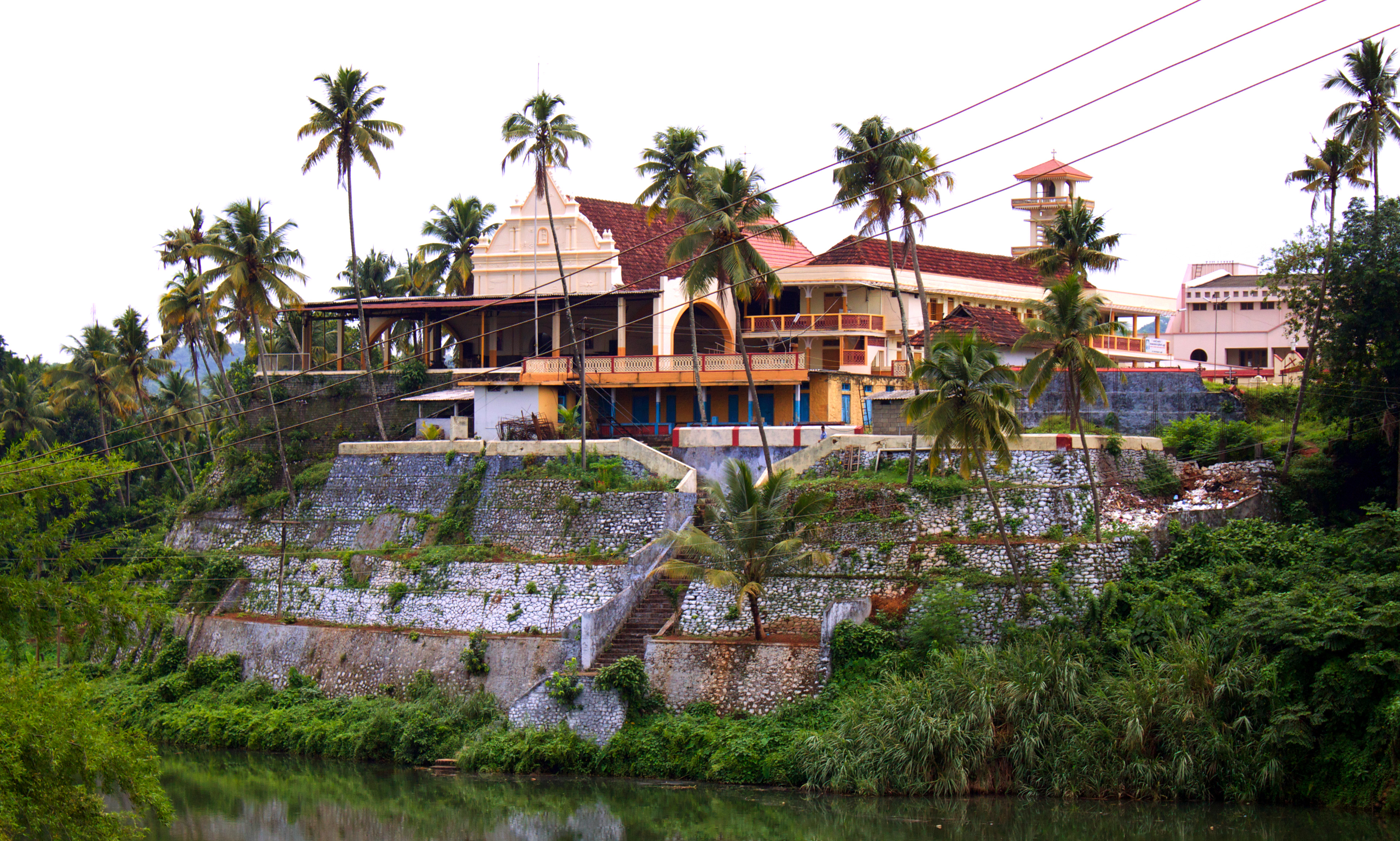
- St. Mary's Orthodox Syrian Cathedral, Piravom

- Location within Kerala
- 9.8782°N 76.487°E
- Location: Piravom, Ernakulam District, Kerala
- Country: India
- Denomination: Malankara Orthodox Syrian Church

History
- Founded: 6th century
- Dedication: Holy Magi, St. Mary, St. Peter and St. Paul, St. George

Administration
- Diocese: Kandanad East

St. Mary's Orthodox Syrian Cathedral, Piravom, also known as Piravom Valiyapally, is a prominent church that belongs to the Malankara Orthodox Syrian Church. The church stands on a hilltop on the eastern bank of the Muvattupuzha river at Piravom, 35 km. east of Kochi. The church was built by the ancient Syrian Christians in the name of Holy Mary. It is a pilgrimage center for Syrian Christians in Kerala. The church stands on a hilltop on the eastern bank of the Muvattupuzha river at Piravom, 35 km. east of Kochi.

== Important festivals ==
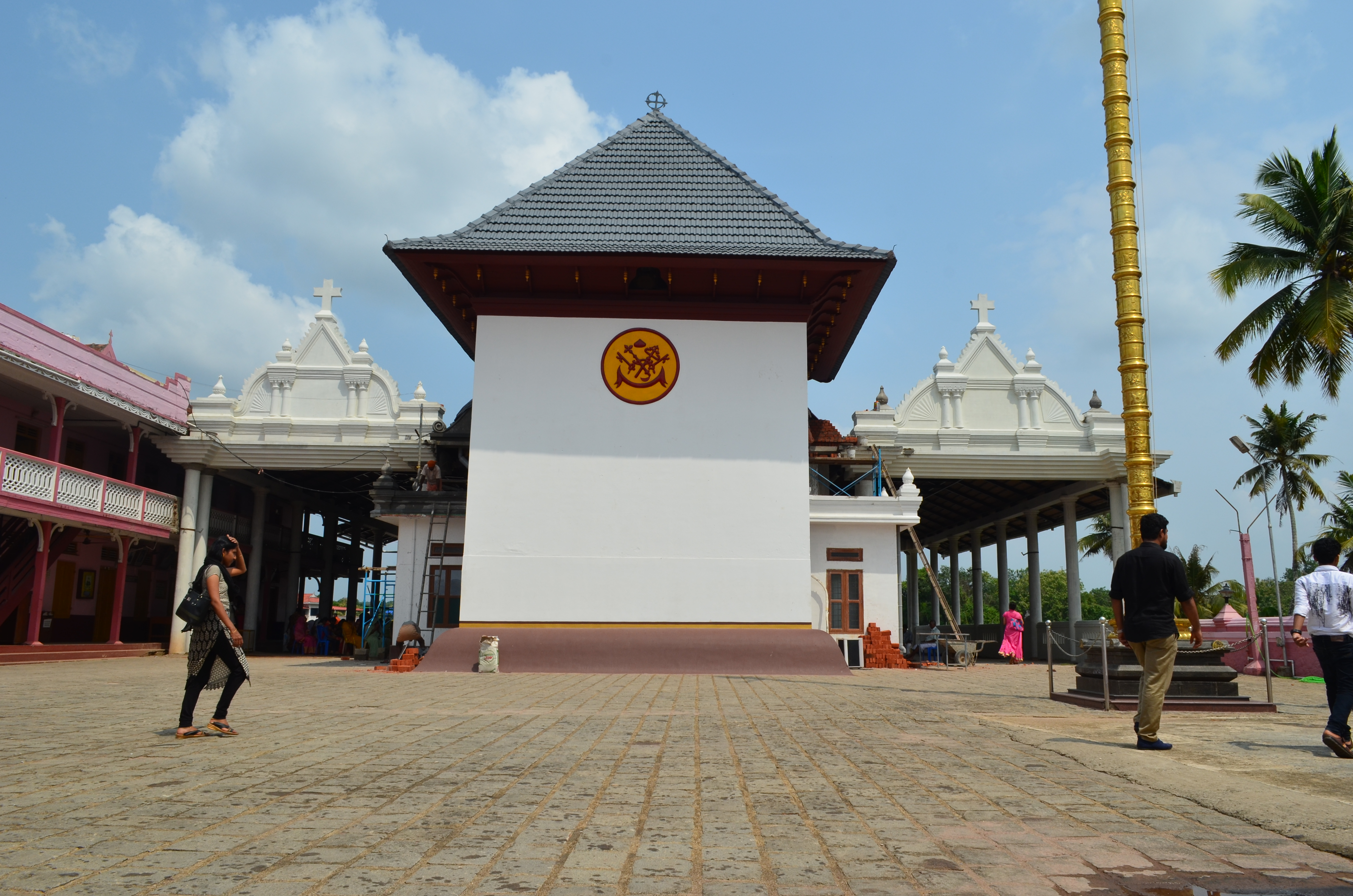
Back View of Piravom Church

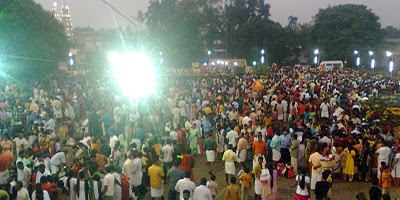
‘Paithel Nercha’ at Valiyapally, Piravom

Denaha (Annual celebration of the holy Baptism of Christ) on January 6 is the main celebration in the church. The best attraction of the festival is the procession.

The 'Paithel Nercha' (the feast for 12 male children) on the Easter Day at the Piravom church is one of the major offerings dedicated to the church. The main part of the offering is 12 infants who will sit with the priest who sanctifies the offering, and they will be offered food.

The Festival of St. George on May 7 and St. Mary on August 15 are other main festivals.

== 2019 conflict between Jacobite and Orthodox ==
A disagreement between the Jacobite Syrian Christian Church and the Malankara Orthodox Syrian Church over who has custody over the Piravom Valiyapally since the two denominations split apart in 1912. On 3 July 2017, the Supreme Court of India ruled that the church was the property of the latter. On 24 September 2019, a standoff over who controls the church developed between members of the two churches. Over 700 police personnel were deployed to keep the calm. The situation came to a head on 25 September when the MOSC members with help of police blocked the Jacobite faithful from entering the church on a court order. but the church was taken from the Jacobite faithful under immense police presence and dozens of Jacobite faithfuls were arrested. The two day standoff came to an end on 26 September when Kerala police forcibly evicted the Jacobite faithful occupying the church. On 28 September the Indian Orthodox members took over the church, although Jacobites continued to protest outside, and plan to build a church close by.

Near the Piravom church of the Jacobite faction, a chapel was built and relics were installed under the patronage of the Holy Magi (Three Hindu Kings). Later, the Malankara Orthodox faction changed its name, dedicating it to the Virgin Mary.
