= Pazhoor Perumthrikkovil =

Shiva temple in Kerala, India

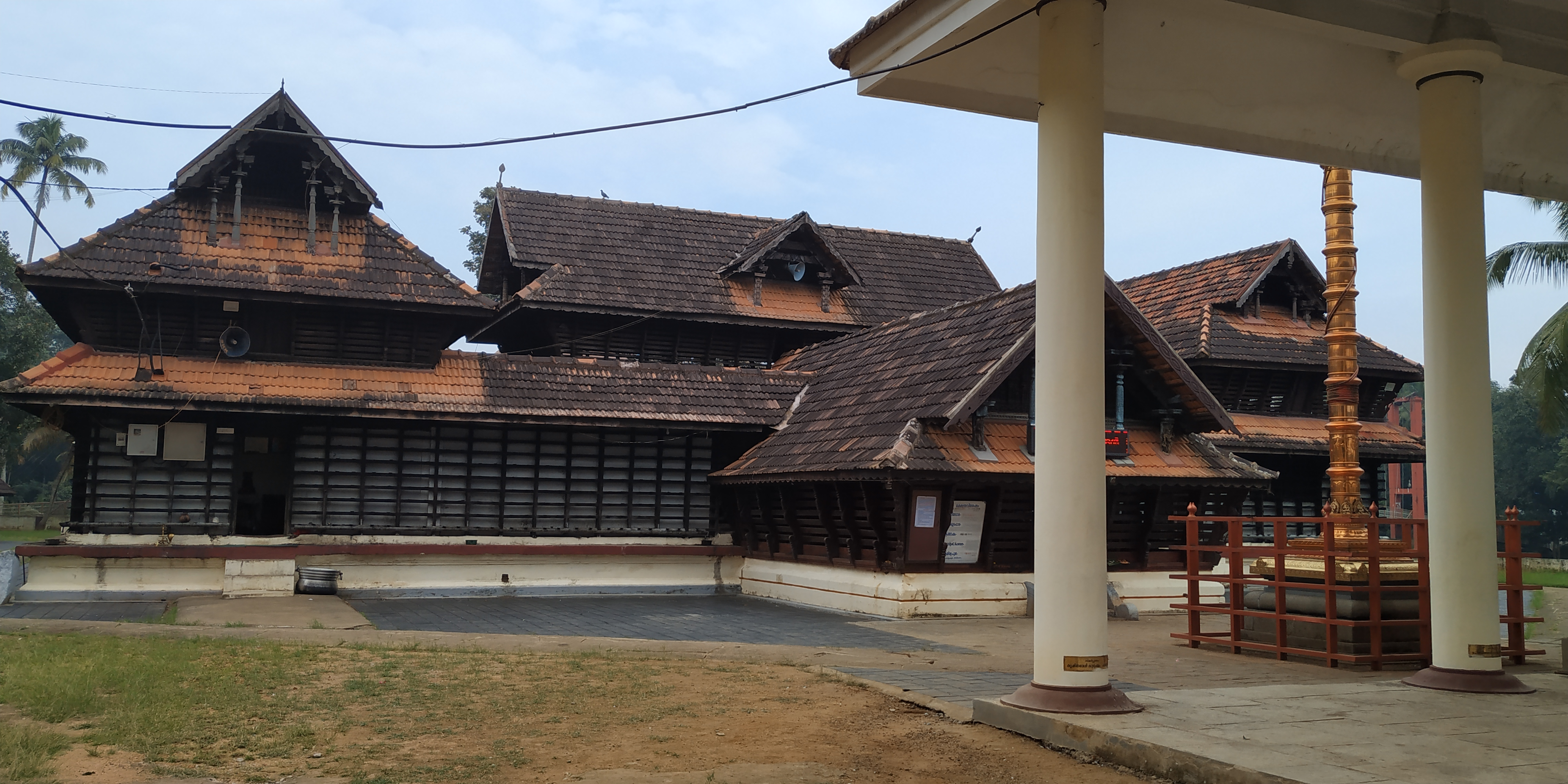

- Perumthrikkovil, Pazhoor, Piravom, Ernakulam, Kerala

Religion
- Affiliation: Hinduism
- District: Ernakulam
- Deity: Shiva

Location
- Location: Pazhoor, Piravom
- State: Kerala
- Country: India
- Interactive map of Pazhoor Perumthrikkovil
- Coordinates: 9.885048°N 76.472508°E

Architecture
- Type: Architecture of Kerala

Specifications
- Temple: One
- Elevation: 34 m (112 ft)

Pazhoor Perumthrikkovil is a temple of Shiva of Hindu tradition located in the town of Piravom, Ernakulam, Kerala, India. A unique phenomenon observed here is that the Muvattupuzha river flowing west from east changes direction on reaching the temple. It retraces its path and flows east for a certain distance before diverting again to north and west. Had the river not changed its course, the temple would have been washed away.

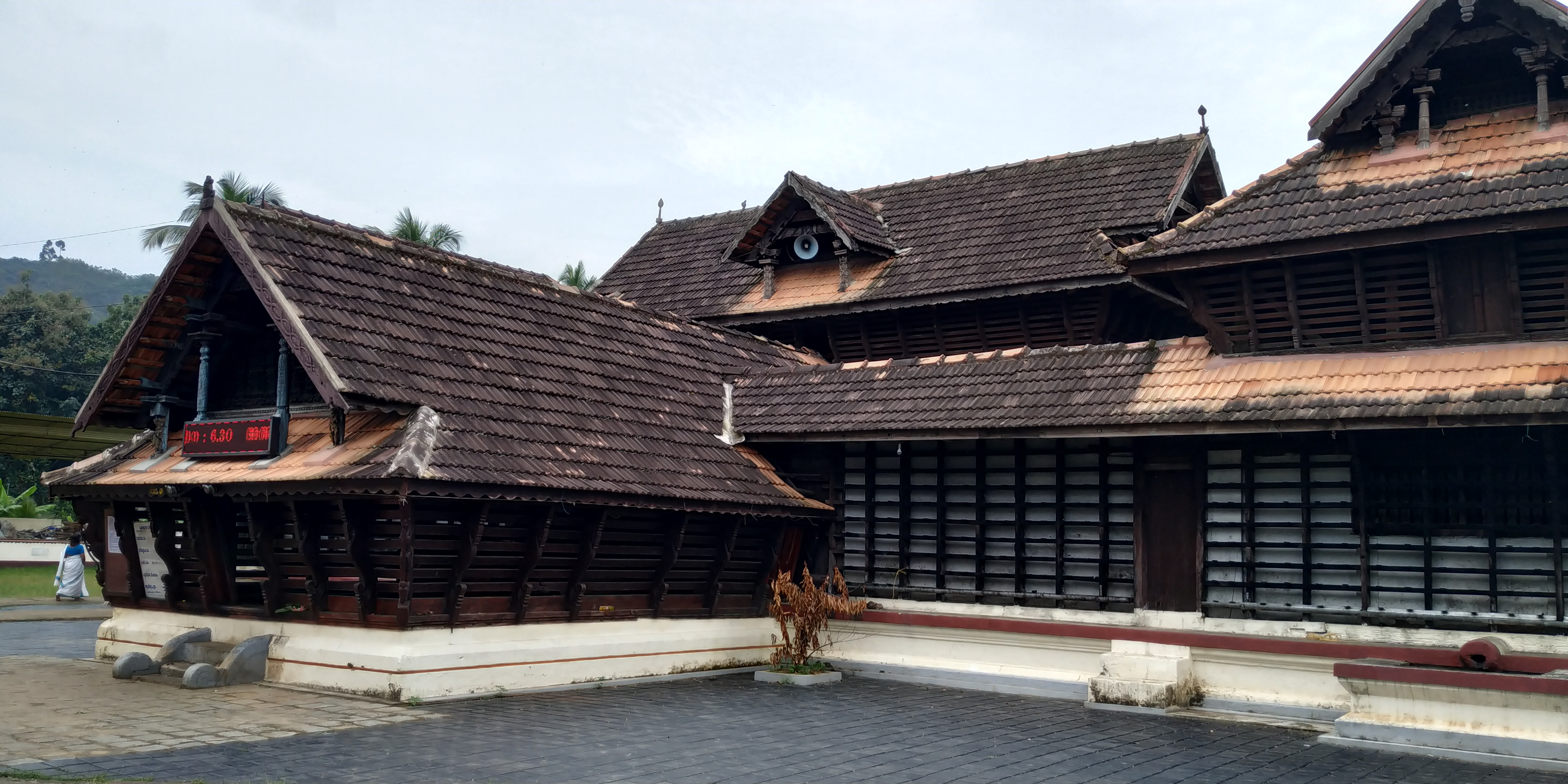
Pazhoor Perumthrikkovil Temple

== Type ==
It is Sandhara type temple with cardinal doors on Four sides. The plinth and the wall together are of granite stone work and the rest of timber and sheet roof in circular vimana. Dwarapalakas are made of wood. Main deity Lord Shiva is facing east. Square ardhamandapa contains beautiful wooden carvings on the ceiling. Pranala is a typical ornate Kerala type with standing Yaksha bearing at its tip. It has some of the notable examples of old workmanship in wood, illustrating various scenes from puranas and figures from Bhagavata Purana, Ramayana, and Mahabharata. The temple can be dated to 12th century AD.

Considering the structural and mural importance, the temple was declared as protected monument by Kerala State Archaeology Department in 1994.

== Archeological details ==
Name of Monument	Perum Trukkovil Pazhoor
Features	Structural temple built around 12th century. Wood Carvings and Mural paintings. There is a palace like traditional structure outside the temple compound
Name of municipality	Piravom
Name of Taluk	Muvattupuzha
Total area of monument	1.45 acres (5,900 m^{2}) Sy No.590/30.75 acres (124,400 m^{2}) 590/5Total : 2.20 acres (8,900 m^{2})
Notification No	N0.5500/B1/93/CAD dated 22.1.1994

Source - Archeological data from government

== See also ==
- Pazhoor Padippura
