= Pazhoor Padipura =

Pazhoor Padippura
- Location in Kerala

General information
- Location: Pazhoor, Ernakulam, Kerala
- Coordinates: 9.8858°N 76.4788°E

Website
- pazhoorpadippura.com/home.html

Pazhoor Padippura, is situated 33 km towards the southeast of Kochi, near Piravom, Kerala. It is an astrology center linked to Pazhoor Perumthrikkovil temple. The temple is believed to be nearly 1,800 years old. A unique phenomenon observed here is that the Muvattupuzha river flowing west from east changes direction on reaching the temple. It retraces its path and flows east for a certain distance before diverting again to north and west. Had the river not changed its course, the temple would have been washed away.

== See also ==
- Pazhoor Perumthrikkovil
