= Koolimadu =

- Village
- Location in Kerala, India
- Coordinates: 11.2714°N 75.9778°E
- Country: India
- State: Kerala
- District: Kozhikode

Government
  - Body: Chathamangalam panchayat

Languages
  - Official: Malayalam, English
- Time zone: UTC+5:30 (IST)
- PIN: 673661
- Telephone code: 0495
- Vehicle registration: Kl-11 & KL 57

Koolimadu is a village in Chathamangalam Gram panchayat in the Kozhikode district, state of Kerala, India.

This village is known as India's first anti-tobacco village.

== Anti-tobacco initiative ==
Koolimadu became tobacco-free on 11 January 1995, following a year-long community campaign involving local clubs, residents, and doctors to raise awareness about the health risks of smoking and chewing tobacco.

The initiative includes community awareness programs, signage informing visitors of the ban, and active participation by local traders to maintain a smoke-free environment.

Local residents report reduced cases of respiratory and smoking-related illnesses since the ban was implemented.

== Geography ==
The village lies along the bank of the Chaliyar River, approximately 3 km from Mavoor and 25 km from Kozhikode city.

== Transportation ==
Koolimadu is connected by local roads to nearby towns including Kozhikode, Mavoor, Mukkom, and Areakode.
