= Piravom =

Piravom പിറവം (Malayalam)
- Municipality
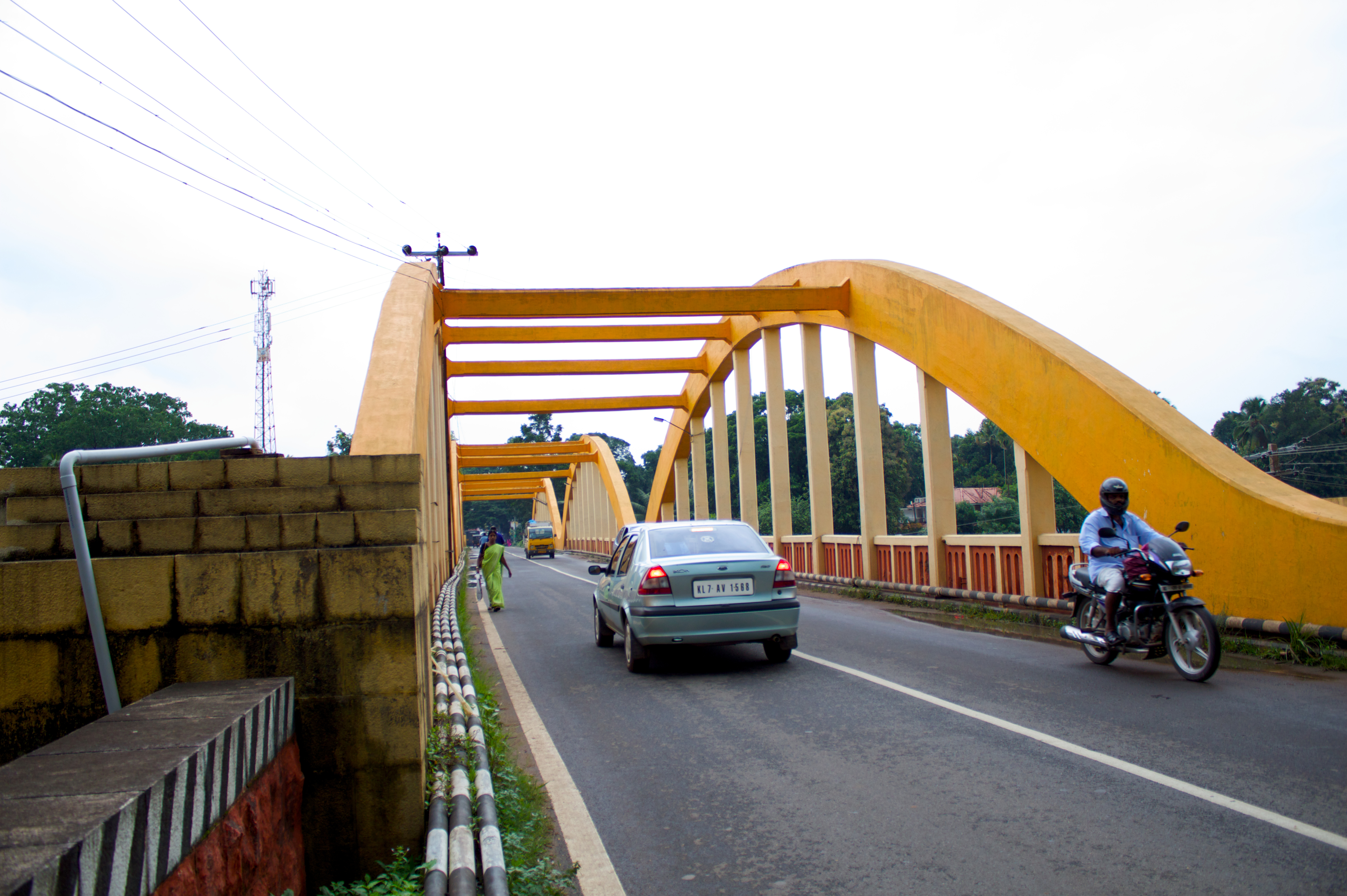
- Piravom Bridge

- Location in Kerala, India Piravom (India)
- Coordinates: 9.87263°N 76.49195°E
- Country: India
- State: Kerala
- District: Ernakulam
- City UA: Kochi

Government
  - Body: Piravom Municipality

Area
  - Total: 29.36 km^{2} (11.34 sq mi)

Population (2011)
  - Total: 27,229
  - Density: 927.4/km^{2} (2,402/sq mi)

Languages
  - Official: Malayalam, English
- Time zone: UTC+5:30 (IST)
- PIN: 686664
- Telephone code: 0485
- Vehicle registration: KL-07 KL-17
- Nearest city: Kochi, Kottayam
- Lok Sabha constituency: Kottayam
- Assembly constituency: Piravom assembly constituency
- Civic agency: Piravom municipality
- Website: piravommunicipality.lsgkerala.gov.in/en

Piravom (Malayalam pronunciation: [piraʋəm]) is a town and municipality in the Ernakulam district of Kerala, India. It is located 30 km from Ernakulam, the nearest city and 22 km (13.7 mi) south of the district collectorate in Thrikkakara.The Piravom Road Railway Station is situated 9 km from the town. Piravom is known for its rich cultural and religious heritage, with two major festivals attracting large crowds each year. The Piravom Pally Perunnal and Sivarathri at Pazhoor Perumthrikkovil Temple. As per the 2011 Indian census, Piravom has a population of 27,229 people, and a population density of 927/km^{2} (2,400/sq mi).

== History ==
Piravom was owned by the Vadakkumkoor Kingdom until it was captured by Travancore kingdom, and is now part of the Indian state of Kerala.

Piravom was reverted to panchayat status in 1992 after two years as a municipality because of skepticism that its classification as a municipality would attract higher tax rates and building regulation. However, as modern municipal councils now have the authority to fix the tax rate and new building rule provisions are now applicable to special grade panchayats, the economic incentive for Piravom remaining a panchayat has disappeared. The local government of Piravom passed a unanimous resolution for elevation to municipality status. In 2015, the government of Kerala reclassified Piravom as a municipality.

The Kerala state government and the GCDA have plans to incorporate Angamaly, Perumbavoor, Piravom and Kolenchery in Ernakulam district, Mala and Kodungallur in Thrissur district, Thalayolaparambu and Vaikom in Kottayam, and Cherthala in Alappuzha district into the jurisdiction of the Kochi metropolis. The newly formed metropolis would be put under the charge of a new authority called the Kochi Metropolitan Regional Development Authority.

== Places of interest ==
- Pazhoor Padippura is an astrology center linked to Pazhoor Perumthrikkovil located in Piravom is referred in the Aithihyamala by Kottarathil Sankunni.

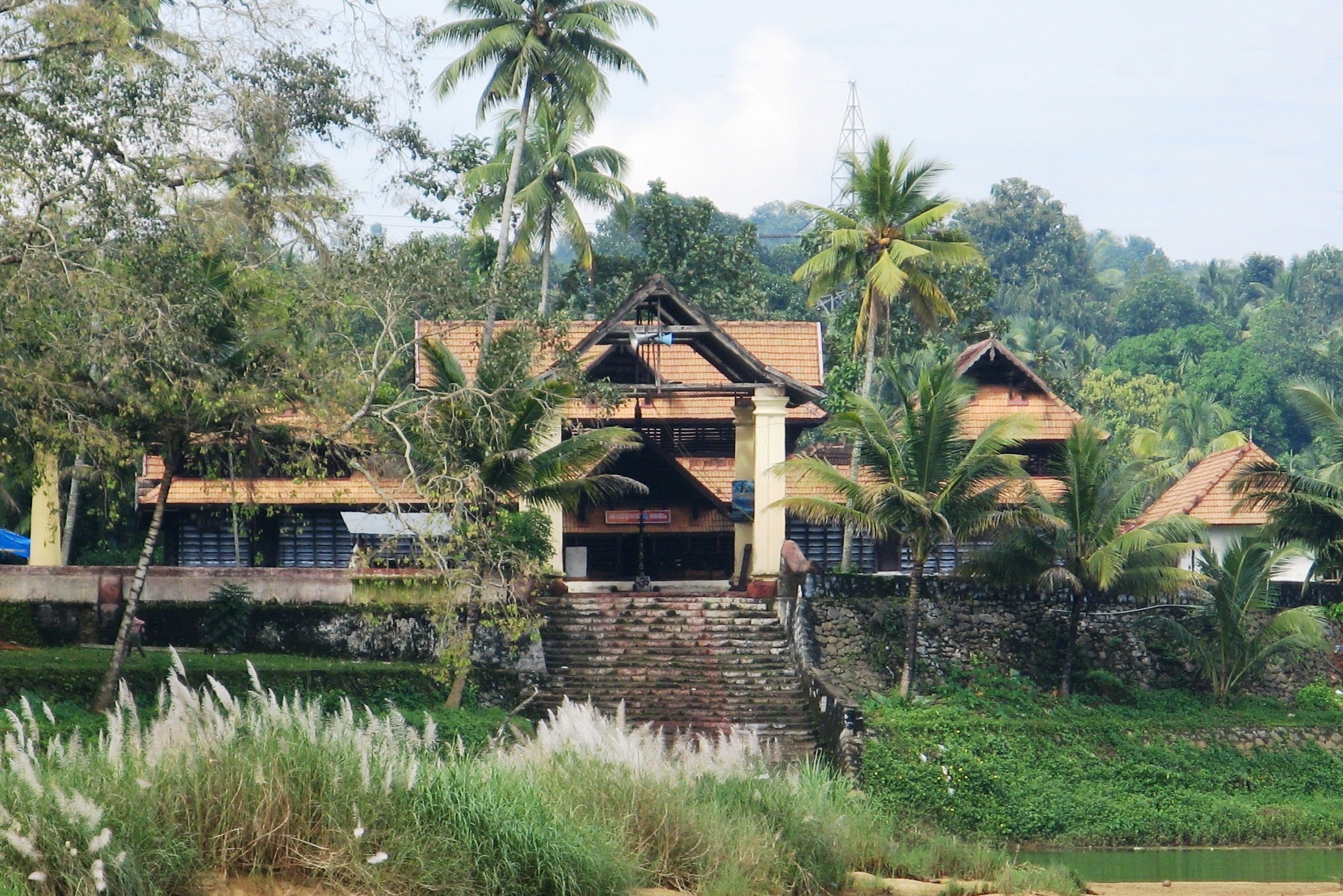
Perumthrkkovil Pazhor

- Pazhoor Perumthrikkovil is a temple of Shiva of Hindu tradition located at the town of Piravom. The temple is believed to be nearly 1,800 years old. Pazhoor Perumthrikkovil is also mentioned in Aithihyamala.

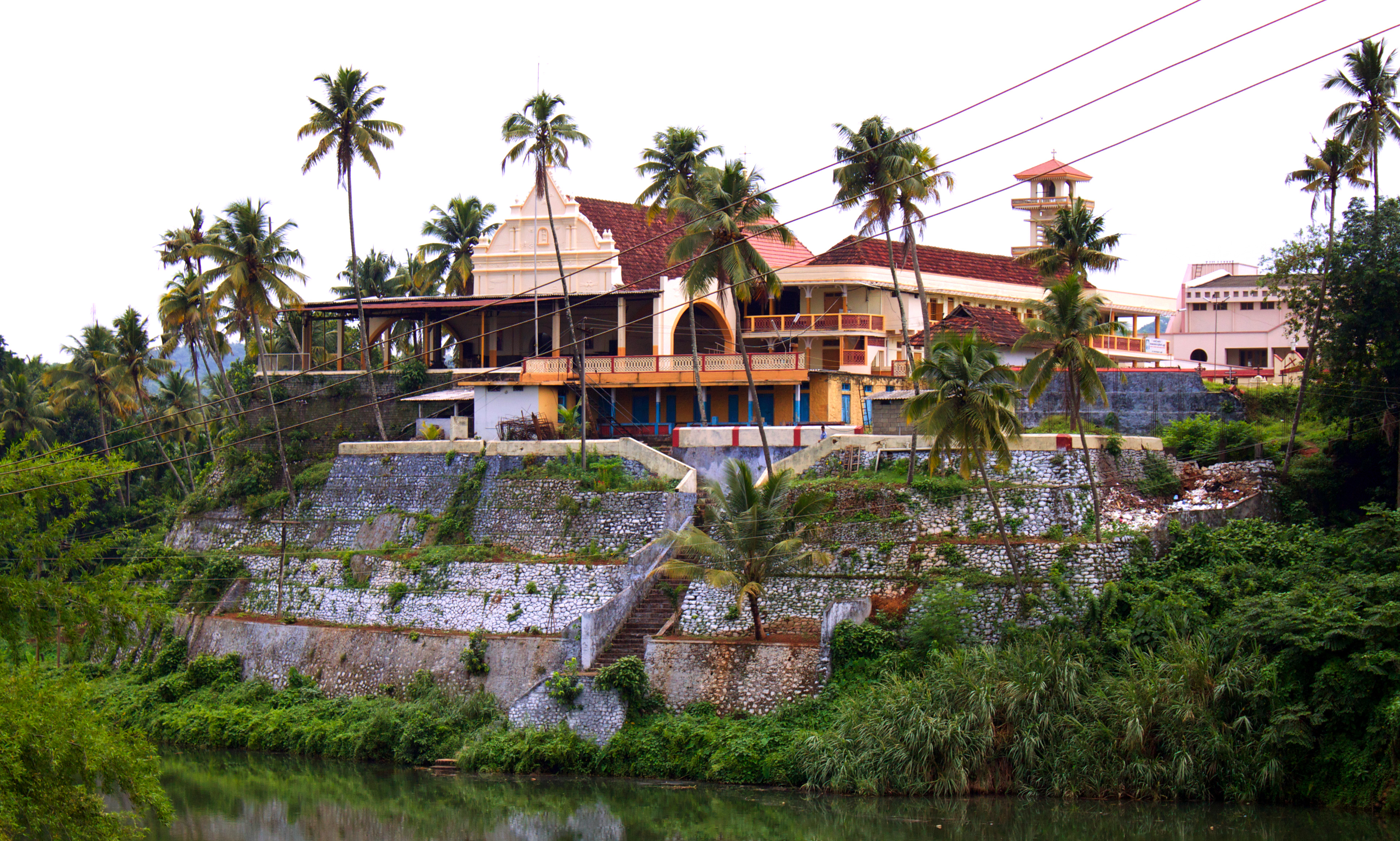
Piravom Valiyapally

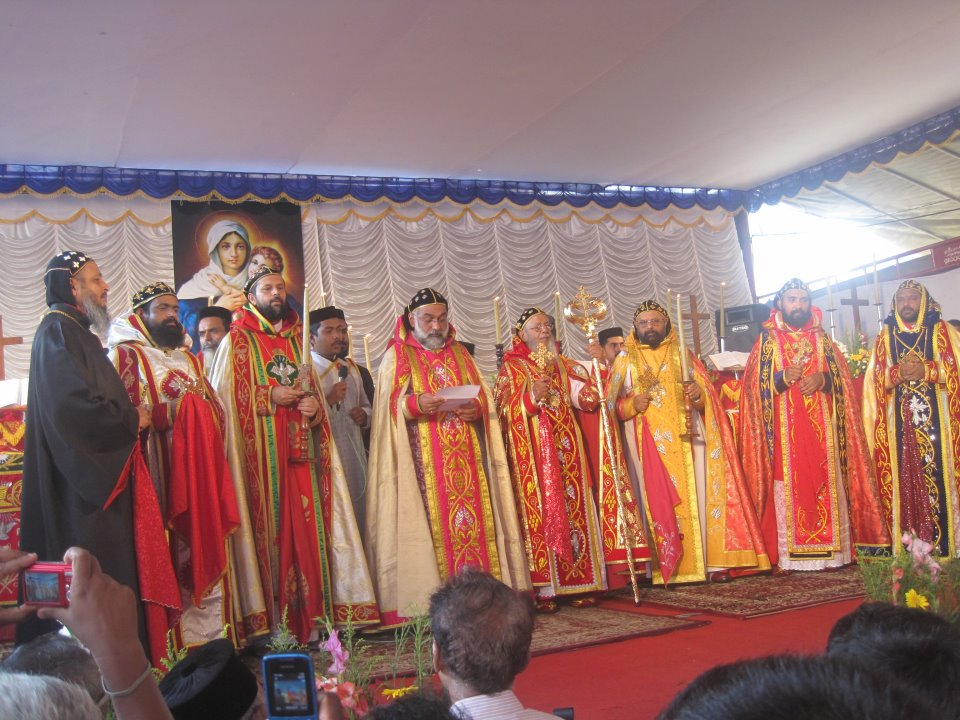
Piravom Valiyapally Cathedral declaration

- Piravom Valiya Pally is one of the oldest churches in Kerala. It stands on a hilltop on the eastern bank of the Muvattupuzha River.
- Adi Shankara Nilayam, in Peppathy, is one of the finest Sanskrit and Indic institutes in India. This is near Chinmaya Viswavidyapeeth.
- Areekkal Waterfalls is located at Pampakuda panchayat near Piravom.

== Educational institutions ==
- Government Higher Secondary School, Piravom
- Government Higher Secondary School, Namakuzhy
- M.K.M.H.S.S., Piravom
- Fatima Central School
- St. Joseph's Higher Secondary School
- Holy Kings Public school Piravom
- BPC College Piravom
- MSM ITI, Piravom
- Vivekananda Public School
- Toc H Public School
- Chinmaya Vishwavidyapeeth, a deemed university under the de novo category, Peppathy
- Naipunnya St. Michael's Public School, Veliyanad.
- Government LPS Piravom
- Government LPS Pazhoor
- Government LPS Kalampoor
- Government LPS Namakkuzhy
- CMS LPS Edappallichira
- St. Antony's LPS Kalluvettamata
- Government UPS Kakkad
- Government UPS Kalampoor

== Places of worship ==
- St. Mary's Orthodox Syrian Cathedral, Piravom
- The famous Pazhoor Perumthrikkovil temple of Lord Shiva - legend says it was renovated by Perumthachan and Pazhoor Padippura
- Assemblies of God in India, Piravom south.
- The Pentecostal Mission, Piravom.
- India Pentecostal Church of God, Piavom.
- Church of God (Full Gospel) in India, Piravom.
- Holy Kings Knanaya Catholic Forane Church, Piravom (Kochupally)
- Little Flower Church, Piravom
- Syro-Malabar Catholic Church, Piravom
- St Gregorios Orthodox Catholic Centre, Piravom
- Pallikkavu Bhagavathi Temple
- Parekkunnu Sree Dharma Sastha Temple Piravom
- Karavelloor Mahadeva Temple (108 sivalaya fame), Kalampoor
- Desadhipan Amarkkulam Sreekrishna Swamy Temple (built by Pandavas)
- Thiruveesamkulam Mahadeva Temple, Palachuvadu
- Mar Yohanon Ihidiyo Orthodox Syrian Church, Mulakkulam
- Parumala mar Gregorious Shrine, Palachuvadu
- Chalasseril Kalari Paradevatha Kshetram
- St. Mary's Syrian Orthodox Church, Kottarakkunnu
- St. Peter's and St. Paul's Orthodox Syrian Church (Parel Pally), Namakuzhy, Mulakulam North
- St. George Orthodox Syrian Church, Karmelkunnu, Mulakkulam
- St. Mary's Orthodox Cathedral, Mannookkunnu
- Onnakoor St. Mary's Orthodox Church, Valiyapally (In Pampakuda Panchayath)
- Anchupoojayum Vilakkum Mahotsavam at Desadhipan Amarkkulam Sreekrishnaswamy Temple
- Perumbadavum St George Orthodox church, Elanji (near Piravom, Elanji Panchayath).
- Uthram Vilaku Mahotsavam at Pisharukoil temple, Piravom (Kumbha Masam)
- St. Andrew's Church, Palachuvadu, Piravom
- St. Michael's Church, Kolengai
- Sreepurushamangalam Sreekrishna Temple, Kakkad
- Brethren Assembly, Piravom
- Spiritual Feast, Kakkad, Piravom.
- Puthussery Thrikka Balanarasimha Swamy Temple
- Acharyakovil Devi temple
- Pallippattu Devi Temple, Pazhoor
- Peringamala Shreekrishna swami temple
- Thirumanamkunnu Devi temple
- Oozhathumala Mahadeva temple
- Melpazhur Mana Temple
- Kalampoorkkavu Devi Temple
- St Luke's CSI Church Piravom (Kollickal)

== Festivals ==
- Holy Danaha Perunnal at St. Mary's Orthodox Syrian Cathedral (Piravom valiya pally perunnal)
- Vishudha Rajakanmarude Thirunnal at Piravom Kochu pally
- Pazhoor Shivaraathri and Thiruvaathira Aarattu Maholthsavam
- Easter at St. Mary's Orthodox Syrian Cathedral (Piravom valiya pally)
- Thiruvathira Mahotsavam of Thiruveeshamkulam Temple
- Pallikkavu Meenabharani Festival
- Acharikovil Meenabharani Festival
- Athachamayam Festival
- Kalamboor Kaavu pana Maholsavam Kalampoor, Thookkam
- Medam Rohini Mahotsavam, Sree Purushamangalam Temple, Kakkad
- Pazhoor Pallippattu Temple Pana Maholsavam
- Makara Vilakku Maholsavam at Parekkunnu Sree Dharma Sastha Temple Piravom
- Makara Vilaku Ulsavam at Thaliyil Ayyapa Temple Kalampoor
- Piravom Vallam Kali festival organised by Piravom Municipality.

== Politics ==
Piravom Assembly Constituency has been incorporated into Kottayam Lok Sabha Constituency, led by Francis George, as a part of the delimitation of parliament seats in India. The assembly was previously part of Muvattupuzha Lok Sabha Constituency. Notable people • T. M. Jacob (1950–2011): Former Cabinet Minister of Kerala and founder of the Kerala Congress (Jacob). He represented the Piravom constituency for several decades and held various portfolios, including Education, Irrigation, and Food & Civil Supplies. • Anoop Jacob: Son of T. M. Jacob and current Member of the Legislative Assembly (MLA) representing Piravom. He served as the Minister for Food and Civil Supplies in the UDF government (2012–2016). .MJ jacob Cpi(M)who served as MLA of Piravom from 2006-2011, who was the man behind major developments at piravom . • K. P. Salim: A senior leader of the Communist Party of India (Marxist) (CPI(M)) who played a pivotal role in the local governance of Piravom. His career spans several key administrative positions: • Local Governance: He served as the President of the Piravom Grama Panchayat and later as the Vice Chairperson of the Piravom Municipality following its elevation from a panchayat. • Academic Administration: He was a member of the Mahatma Gandhi University Senate, contributing to the educational policy and administration of the region. • Sabu K. Jacob: A political leader who served as the last President of the Piravom Grama Panchayat and subsequently became the first Chairman of the Piravom Municipality. He has been a key figure in the transition of Piravom from a rural to an urban administrative body.

== Transportation ==
The nearest railway station to Piravom is the Piravam Road Railway Station (Velloor), which has stops for all passenger trains and most express trains. The nearest major railway station is at Ernakulam.

The nearest airport, Cochin International Airport, is at Nedumbassery.

A government transport (KSRTC) bus depot is located at Piravom.

A private bus stand is located at the center of Piravom. The buses provide connectivity to Kochi and nearby towns.

== Location ==
The town is situated on the banks of the Muvattupuzha River.

== See also ==
- Piravom Valiya Palli
- Pazhoor Padippura
- Malankara Orthodox Syrian Church
- Syriac Orthodox Church
- Thirumarayoor
