= St. Antony's Church, Kuninji =

Syro-Malabar Catholic parish church in India

St. Antony's Church Kuninji
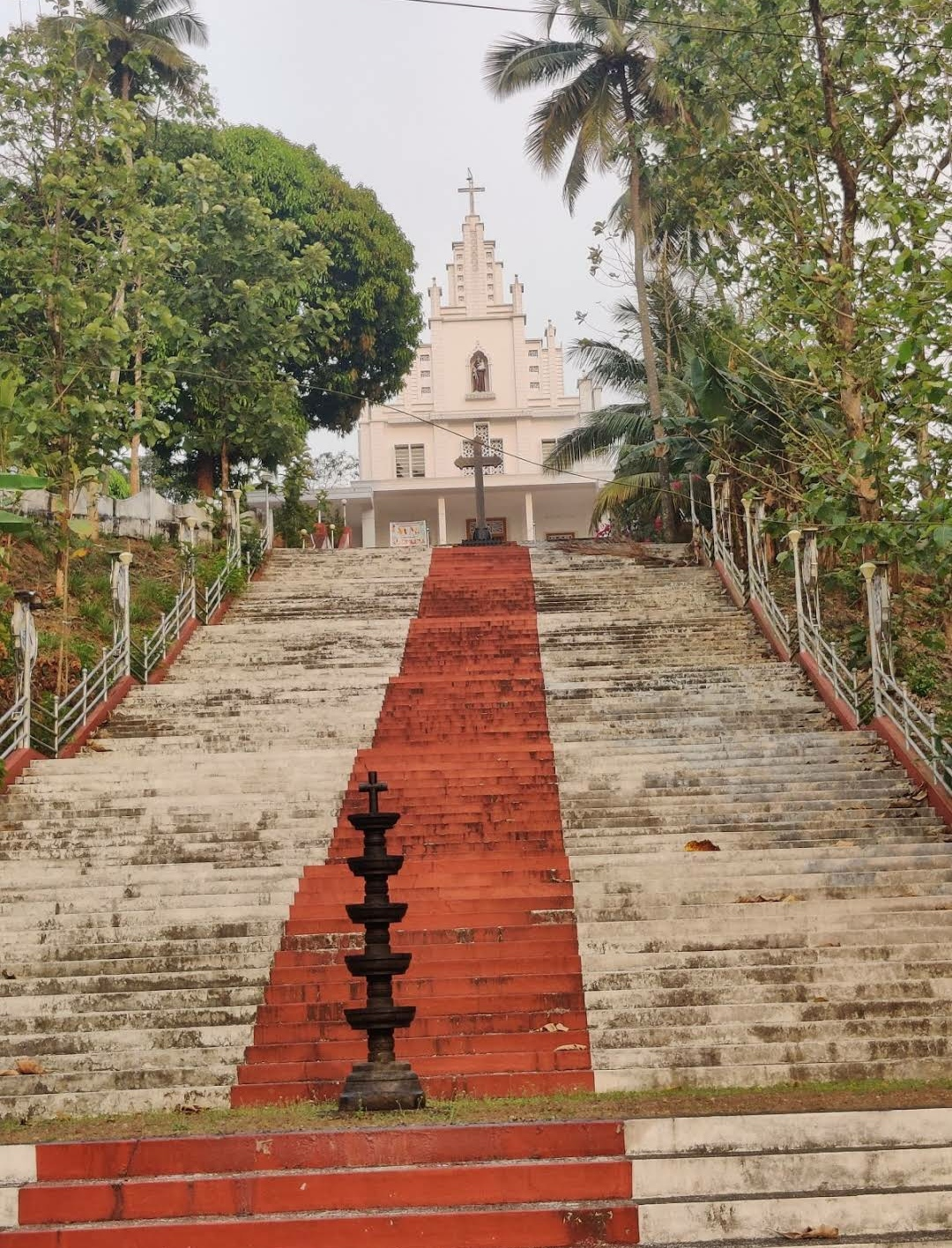
- St. Antony's Church Kuninji
- 9.8475°N 76.6499°E
- Location: Kuninji
- Country: India
- Denomination: Catholic Church
- Sui iuris church: Syro-Malabar Church
- Website: http://www.stantonyschurchkuninji.com

History
- Founded: 1919

Administration
- District: Idukki
- Diocese: Kothamangalam

St. Antony's Church is a parish church of the Syro-Malabar Church in the village of Kuninji in Idukki district of Kerala.
