= St. Joseph's Syro-Malabar Church, Meenkunnam =

St. Joseph's Syro-Malabar Catholic Church
- St. Joseph's Syro-Malabar Catholic Church
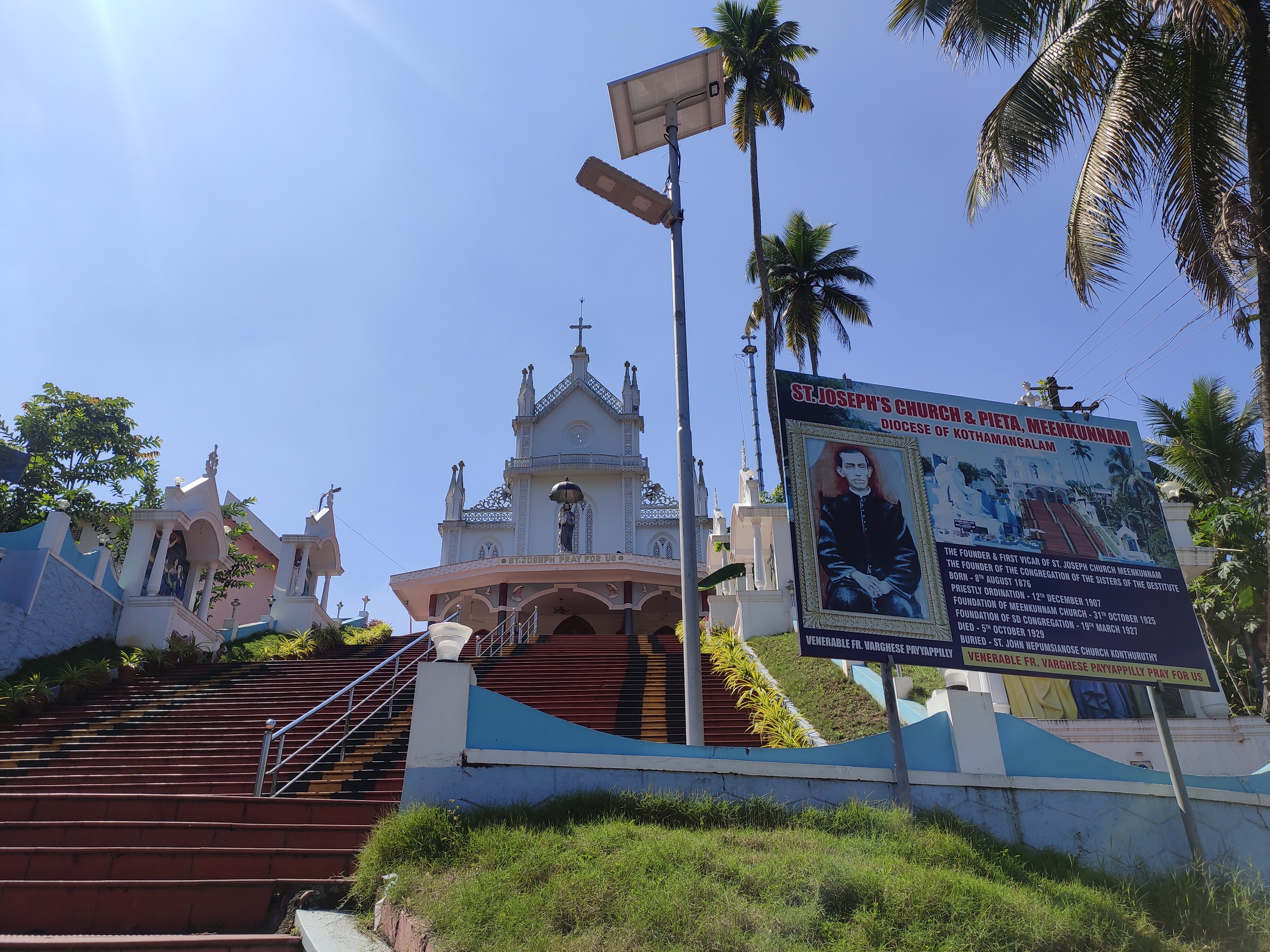
- St. Joseph's Syro-Malabar Catholic Church, Meenkunnam
- St. Joseph's Syro-Malabar Catholic Church
- Location: Meenkunnam, Muvattupuzha
- Country: India
- Denomination: Syro-Malabar Catholic Church

History
- Founded: 1921
- Founder: Mar Varghese Payyappilly Palakkappilly
- Dedication: Saint Joseph
- Consecrated: 1925

Architecture
- Functional status: Active

Administration
- District: Ernakulam
- Diocese: Syro-Malabar Catholic Eparchy of Kothamangalam

Clergy
- Archbishop: Mar Raphael Thattil
- Bishop: Mar George Madathikandathil

St. Joseph's Syro-Malabar Catholic Church is situated in Meenkunnam village, 6 km from Muvattupuzha, India. It was founded by Venerable Mar Varghese Payyappilly Palakkappilly in 1921. The church belongs to the Syro-Malabar Catholic Diocese of Kothamangalam.

== History ==
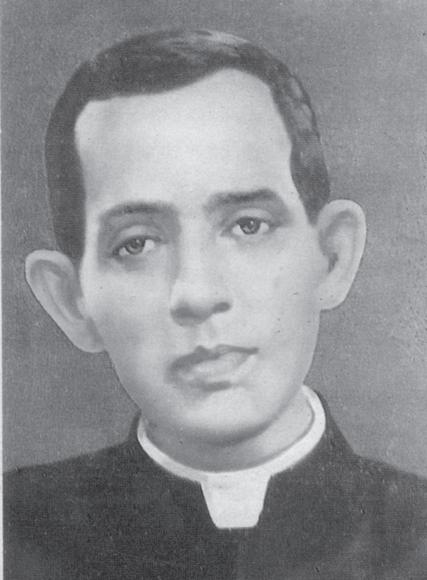
Founder, Mar Varghese Payyappilly Palakkappilly

Meenkunnam village has a large population of Syrian Catholics. These Nasrani Christians, who were previously under Marth Mariam Syro-Malabar Catholic Forane Church, Arakuzha, have more than 1500 years of recorded history.

A main landmark of Meenkunnam is a copy of Michelangelo's Pietà, which was created by the artist Appukuttan. This sculpture at Meenkunnam is roughly 4 times the size of the original Pietà, located at the St. Peter's Basilica, Vatican City. Owing to its size, the artist could make a compromise on intricate details and created a sculpture lacking realism, ideal beauty, harmony and balance observed in the original sculpture which showcases a balance of Renaissance ideals of classical beauty with naturalism.
