= St. George Higher Secondary School, Kothamangalam =

Private aided school in Kerala, India

Coordinates: 10.0626°N 76.6312°E

St. George’s Higher Secondary School, Kothamangalam
- NH-49 road Kothamangalam, Kerala 686691; India

Information
- Type: private-aided School
- Established: 1936 (90 years ago)
- School district: Ernakulam
- Grades: 8th to 12th grade
- Gender: Co-educational
- Accreditation: Kerala State Board

St. George's Higher Secondary School, founded in 1936, is a private school in Kothamangalam, Kerala. Managed by the Eparchy of Kothamangalam, it offers education for grades 8–12 and is noted for its athletic program. The school was established in 1936 and is listed in the Kerala government’s Sametham school database.

According to the Kerala government’s school database, the institution expanded its educational provision to include higher secondary education in 1998. The school provides education from the primary level through the higher secondary level. It is classified as an aided school in the Kerala government’s school database. The Ernakulam district administration lists the institution in its public directory of educational institutions.
