= Kayakkunn =

Kayakkunnu
- Village
- Interactive map of Kayakkunnu
- Coordinates: 11°44′20″N 76°7′15″E
- Country: India
- State: Kerala
- District: Wayanad

Government
  - District Collector: S Suhas IAS
  - DistrictPanchayatPresident: Ushakumari
  - District M.L.A's: Sulthan Bathery : I.C Balakrishnan; Kalpetta: C K Saseendran; Mananthavady : O.R Kelu

Languages
  - Official: Malayalam, English
- Time zone: UTC+5:30 (IST)
- PIN No: 670721
- ISO 3166 code: IN-KL
- Vehicle registration: KL-12, KL-72, KL-73

Kayakkunnu is a village near Nadavayal, Mananthavady in the Wayanad District of Kerala, India. The village is part of the Panamaram Panchayath, and the assembly constituency is Mananthavady (North Wayanad). It is an agricultural area and its main crops include rice, coffee, pepper, ginger, cardamom, vanilla, rubber, areca nut, and coconut. The nearest towns are Nadavayal and Panamaram. Kayakkunn is situated midway along the Mananthavady–Gudalur interstate road.

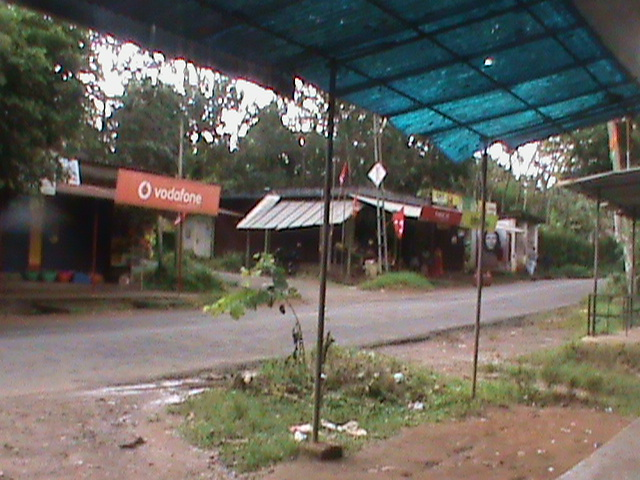
Kayakkunn Junction

== Geography ==
Kayakkunn is a village and one of the main residential areas in the Wayanad district of Kerala, which reaches from Panamaram to Mananthavady along the Sultan Battery State Highway.

Agriculture is the primary source of income, and crops include rice, coconut, coffee, pepper, ginger, cardamom, vanilla, rubber, areca nut, and cocoa beans.

== Etymology ==
Oral history and ancient texts state that the area was known by the name of Muthangadi and that it was later known as Puthangadi, a pearl trade center.

== History ==
Most of the population are early immigrants from Mid-Travancore (മധ്യതിരുവിതാംകൂര്‍) especially in the Kottayam district in central Wayanad. People also immigrated from Malappuram and Mysuru (ಮೈಸೂರು) Karnataka districts to live here.

There are some historical ruins in the area. The oldest are found in nearby Kallambalam and believed to date to Tipu's release.

== Transportation ==
Kayakkunn's main transportation routes are the Sultan Battery State Highway from Mananthavady or Kalpetta. The Periya ghat road connects Mananthavady to Kannur and Thalassery. The Thamarassery mountain road (NH-212) connects Calicut with Kalpetta. The Kuttiady mountain road connects Vatakara with Kalpetta and Mananthavady. The Palchuram mountain road connects Kannur and Iritty with Mananthavady.

The road from Bangalore, Mysore, Gudaloor-Nilgiris, Nilambur, and Ooty is also connected to Wayanad through Sultan battery, Nadavayal-Changanacherry K.S.R.T.C.

There is a daily bus which travels the Sultan Battery highway to connect with the Bangalore–Ooty interstate road. A Pala–Pathanamthitta–Pulpally bus also travels along this route.

The nearest railway stations are at Mysore, Calicut, and Cannanoor. And the nearest airports are Kozhikode International Airport, 3 hours away, Kannur International Airport, 2.5 hours away, and ಬೆಂಗಳೂರು Karnataka Kempegowda International Airport 6.5 hours away.

== Landmarks ==
- Cross church Kayakkunn
- Kayakkunn Ancient Stone Temple Kayakkunn Vishnugudi temple
- La-salatte Monastery (New Shrine in Kerala, India – lasalette)
- Kayakkunn Post Office
- Sisters of the Destitute convent
- Wynad Club
- Vayojana Vedi (old age society)
- Vanitha Fruits and Vegetables co-operative society
- "Flora" Mushroom Cultivation Industry
- Blind society
- Milma, Milk marketing Co-operative society
- Agricultural Nursery
- Aumgunvady

== Gallery ==
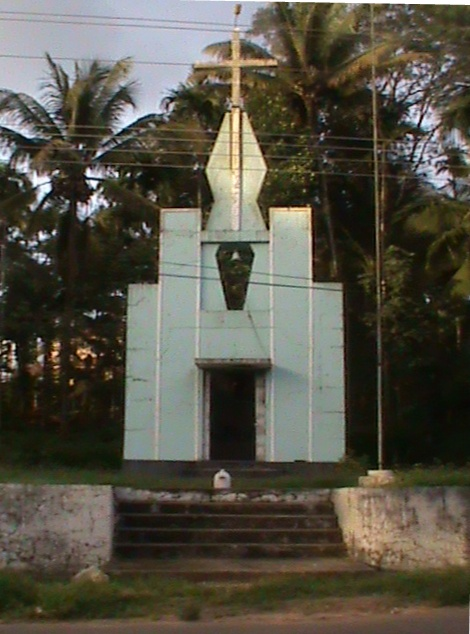
Kayakkunn Chapel (shrine)

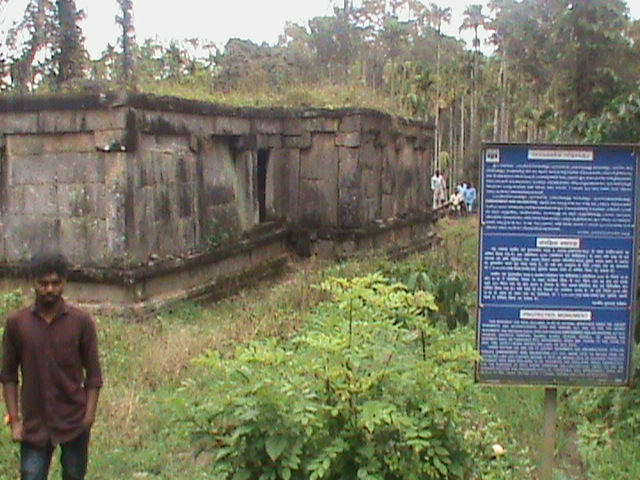
Kayakkunn stone temple

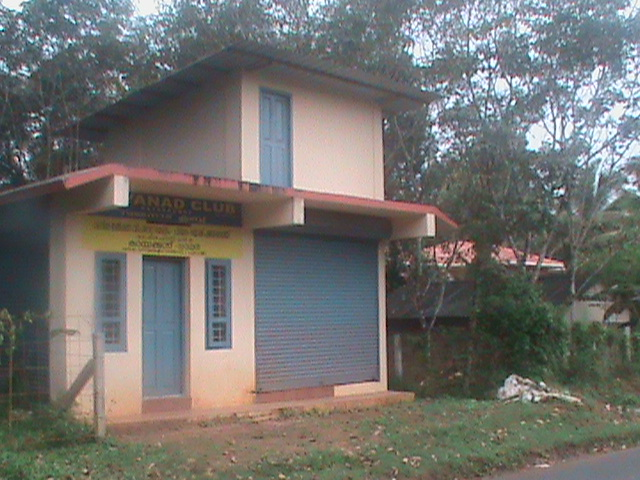
Wayanad Club

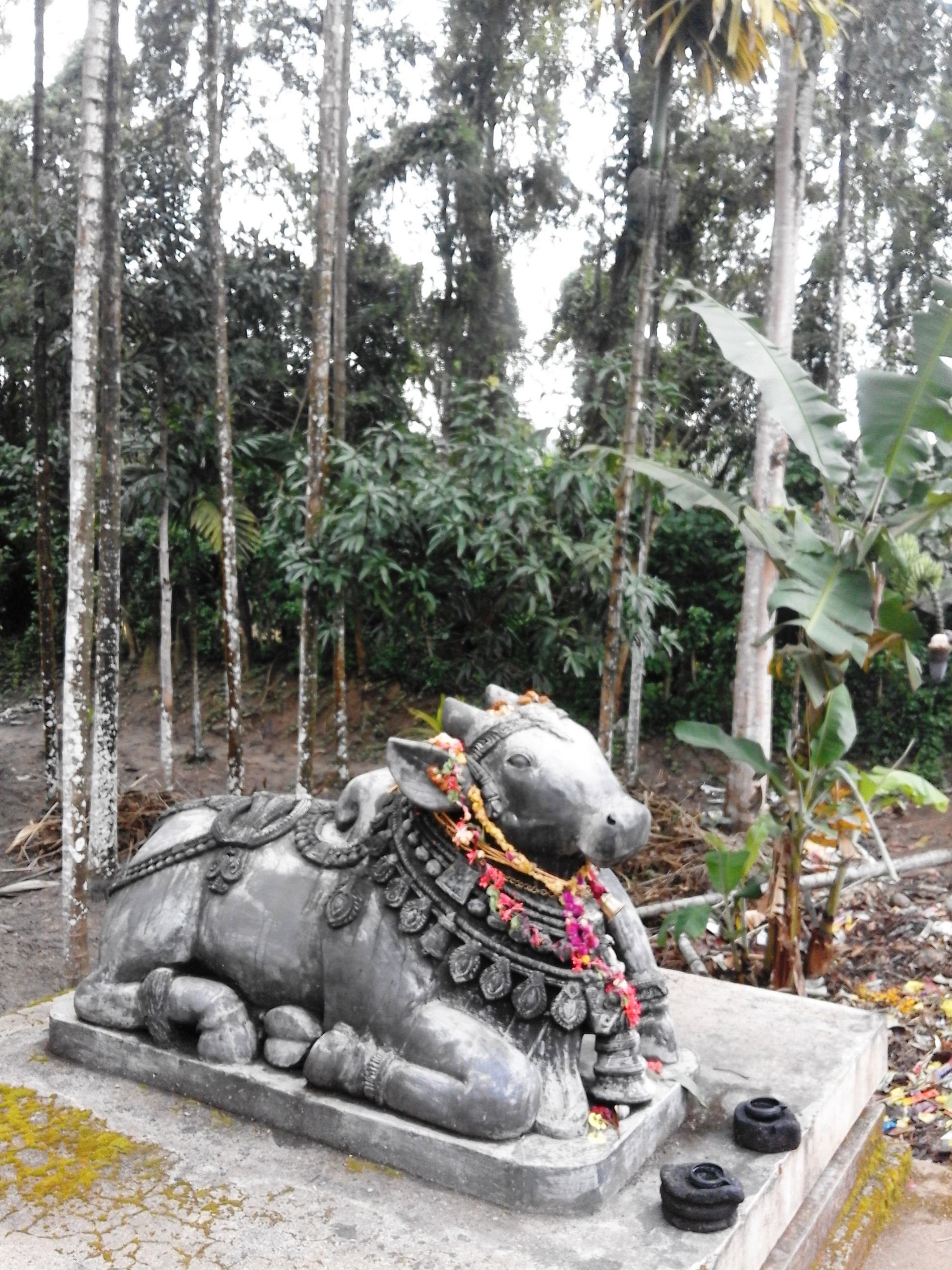
Bull Statue, Punchavayal

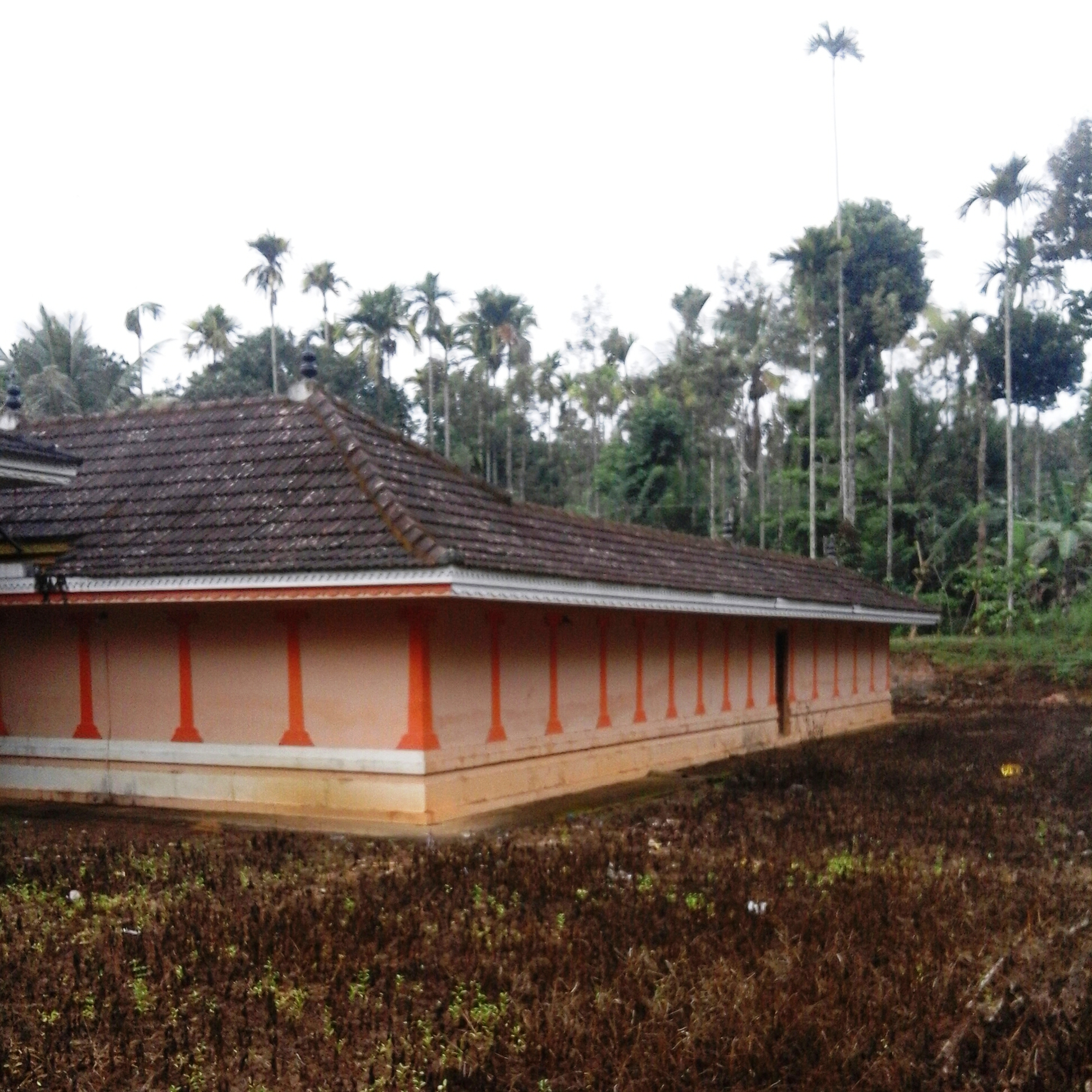
Punchavayal temple

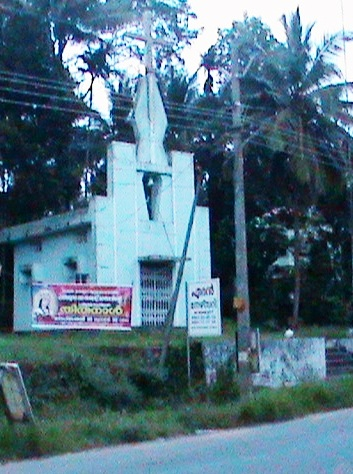
side view of (shrine) Kayakkunn Chapel
