= Sebastian Kappen =

Indian Jesuit theologian

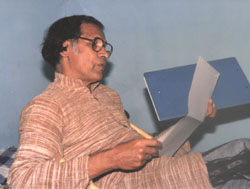
Kappen

Sebastian Kappen (4 January 1924 – 30 November 1993) was an Indian Jesuit priest and liberation theologian.

== Formation and studies ==
Born into a traditional Nasrani family in Kodikulam, Travancore, during the British Raj, Kappen entered the Society of Jesus at the age of 20 (in 1944), and was ordained a priest on 24 March 1957. He pursued studies at the Gregorian University (Rome), obtaining a doctorate in Theology (1961) with a thesis on Religious Alienation and Praxis according to Marx's Economic and Philosophical Manuscripts of 1844. This was a time when Marxism was growing in influence in his home state of Kerala, in India.

Away from scholasticism and its essentialism, he found in Marxian tools of social analysis effective instruments to understand the people's alienation from freedom and loss of ability to contribute to the wellbeing of society.

== Evolving thought and action ==
Henceforth, Freud, Marx and the gospel of Mark became the dialectical poles of Kappen's thought and life, in view of liberating the human person from hidden oppressive psychological and social forces. Healing and wholeness are found in the person of Jesus, the Son of God.

His theological stances evoked strong criticism in traditional circles of the Church. In 1972 Kappen moved out of Jesuit large institutions and started living among the poor wherever he was posted: in Cochin, and later in Trivandrum, Madras and Bangalore as well. Despite regular attempts to bring him back into regular Jesuit community life, his superiors ultimately consented to let him adopt a lifestyle more conducive to his creative writing. His locus theologicus was the people, and particularly the poor.

His studies were geared towards transformative social action in India. This led him to a study of the liberating and humanizing potential of the original teachings of Jesus, with a strong preference for the Gospel of Mark. He also drew on Indian traditions, particularly that of religious dissent represented by the Buddha and the medieval Bhakti Movement. He wrote and lectured extensively on the cultural restructuring of Indian society.

Ever critical of systems, structures and institutions, Kappen felt his search was leading him beyond denominational and religious affiliations as well as political ideology. In Kappen's view, No political, religious or economic system was absolute, but were all to be valued only insofar as they serve the people. Thus, he felt that party and their ideologies, even of religious ones, could act as spiritual prisons, which he did not want to be confined in, while Jesus offered freedom.

This stance in particular brought him into conflict with Rome. In 1977, he published Jesus and Freedom, with an introduction by the Belgian priest and professor at the Louvain University François Houtart. The book came under official Church scrutiny. Kappen responded with a pamphlet entitled Censorship and the Future of Asian Theology. He wrote:

I write with responsibility. There can be defects or errors in my work. I am not infallible. Responsible thinkers and scholars the world over could judge and sift my work. In public discussions we can help each other and learn from one another. That is how truth grows in history: through a social process, and not through secret censorship.

Kappen was censured for the publication.

Kappen had been visiting professor to the Pontifical Faculty of Theology (Pune), Vidyajyoti College of Theology (Delhi), The Catholic University of Louvain (Belgium) and Maryknoll Seminary (New York).

Kappen began experiencing heart problems in the 1980s. He first quit smoking, then began slowing his intellectual pursuits. Nonetheless, he was particularly incensed by the bombing of Iraq in the Gulf War of 1990–1991. It is possible that this heightened emotional state contributed to a fatal heart attack on 30 November 1993. Kappen died in Bangalore; his body was returned to Kozhikode, where he is buried.

== Writings in English ==
- Jesus and Freedom, Orbis Books, New York, 1977.
- Marxian Atheism, 1983.
- Jesus and Cultural Revolution; an Asian Perspective, 1983.
- Liberation Theology and Marxism, 1986.
- The Future of Socialism and Socialism of the Future, Bangalore, 1992.
- Jesus Today, AICUF, 1985
- Tradition Modernity Counterculture, Visthar, Bangalore, 1994
- Hindutva and Indian Religious Traditions, Manusham, Ettumanoor, 2000
- Divine Challenge and Human Response, C S S, Tiruvalla, 2001
- Jesus and Culture, ISPCK, 2002
- Jesus and Society, ISPCK, 2002
- Towards a Holistic Cultural Paradigm, C S S, Tiruvalla, 2003
- Marx beyond Marxism, Voice Books, 2012
- Ingathering, Jeevan Books, Bharananganam, Kottayam, 2013
- What the Thunder Says, Jeevan Books, Bharananganam, Kottayam, 2013
- Collected Works of Sebastian Kappen, ISPCK, Delhi, 2021 19

I: Jesus and Freedom and Related Essays Volume II: Marxian Atheism and Related Essays Volume III: Jesus and Cultural Revolution and Related Essays Volume IV: Liberation Theology and Marxism and Related Essays Volume V: Hindutva and Indian Religious Traditions and Related Essays Volume VI: Tradition Modernity Counterculture and Related Essays

== Writings in Malayalam ==
- Vswäsathilninnu Viplavathilèkku (From Faith to Revolution),1972.
- Marxian Darsśnathinu Orämukham (An Introduction to the Philosophy of Marx), 1989
- Pravachanam Prathisamskruthi (Prophecy and Counterculture),1992.
- Akraistavanäya Yèśuviné Thèdi (In Search of the Non-Christian Jesus), 1999 (posthumous).

== Posthumous publications ==
- Tradition Modernity Counterculture, 1994.
- Hindutva and Indian Religious Traditions, 2000.
- Divine Challenge and Human Response, 2001.
- Jesus and Society, ISPCK, Delhi, 2002.
- Jesus and Culture, ISPCK, Delhi, 2002.
- Towards a Holistic Cultural Paradigm, 2003.

== Bibliography ==
=== in English ===
- Philip Mathew and Ajit Murickan (ed), Religion, Ideology and counterculture; Essays in honour of S.Kappen, Bangalore, 1987.

=== in Malayalam ===
- Prathi-samskruthiyilekku (Counterculture Thoughts of Fr. Sebastian Kappen), Manusham Publications, Ettumanoor, 2008.
