= St. Mary's Syro-Malabar Major Archiepiscopal Church, Arakuzha =

Church in Kerala, India

Coordinates: 9.9286°N 76.608°E

St. Mary's Forane Church
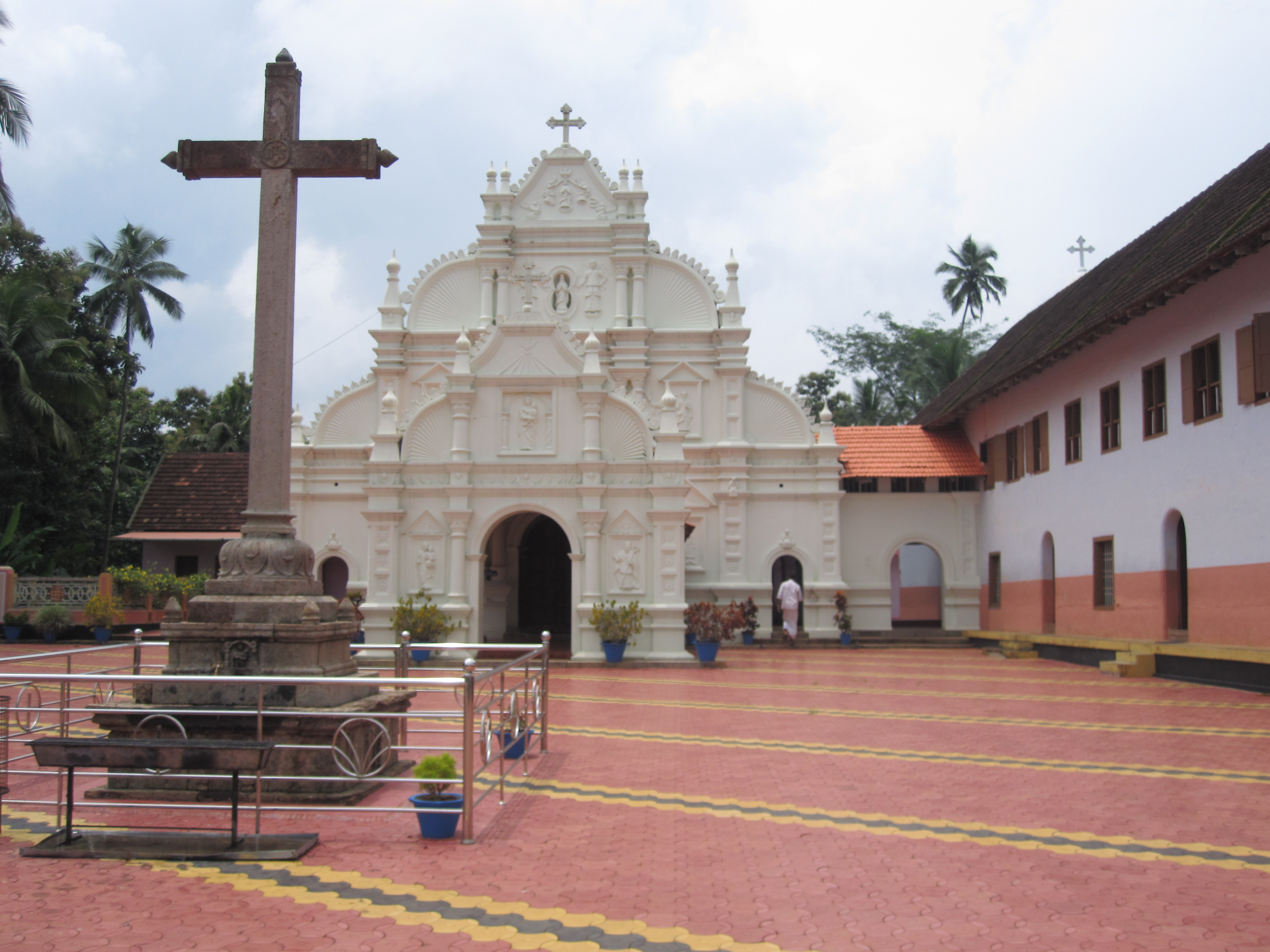

Religion
- Affiliation: Syro-Malabar Catholic Church
- Province: Syro-Malabar Catholic Diocese of Kothamangalam
- Leadership: Major Archbishop

Location
- Location: Arakuzha, Muvattupuzha
- Interactive map of St. Mary's Forane Church

Architecture
- Direction of façade: West

Website
- arakuzhachurch.org

St. Mary's Forane Church is a Syro-Malabar church in Arakuzha village, 6 km from Muvattupuzha, India. The village has a large population of Nasrani Christians. These Nasrani Christians of Arakuzha have more than 1500 years of recorded history. The church is under the jurisdiction of the Syro-Malabar Catholic Eparchy of Kothamangalam. Servant of God Mar Varghese Payyappilly Palakkappilly has served as the parish priest between 1920 and 1922.

== History ==
It was Rathappillil Muthi who erected the Marth Mariam Forane Church at Aarakzha. The church was pulled apart and rebuilt several times.

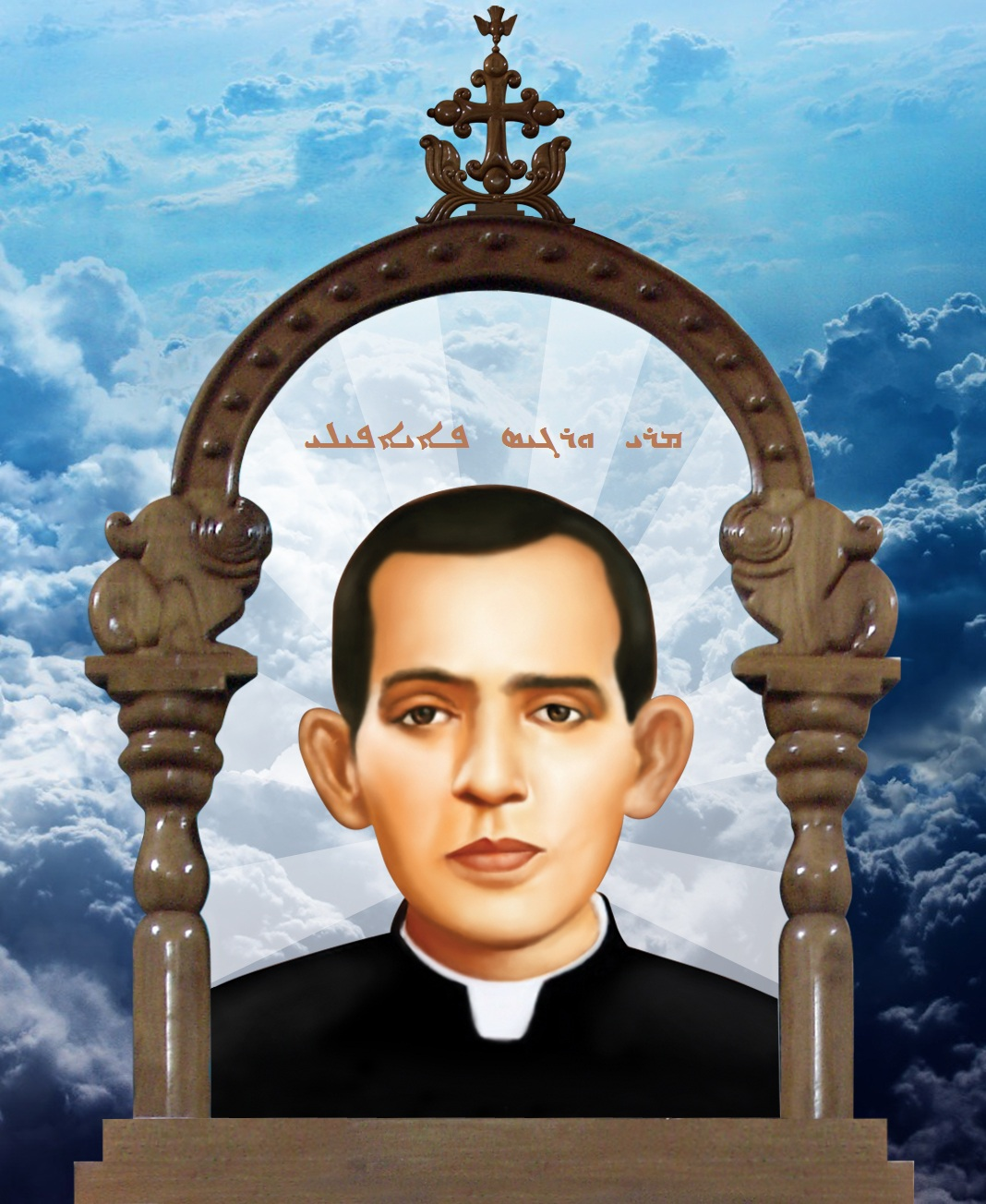
Venerable Mar Varghese Payyappilly served as the vicar of the church during the period 1920-22.

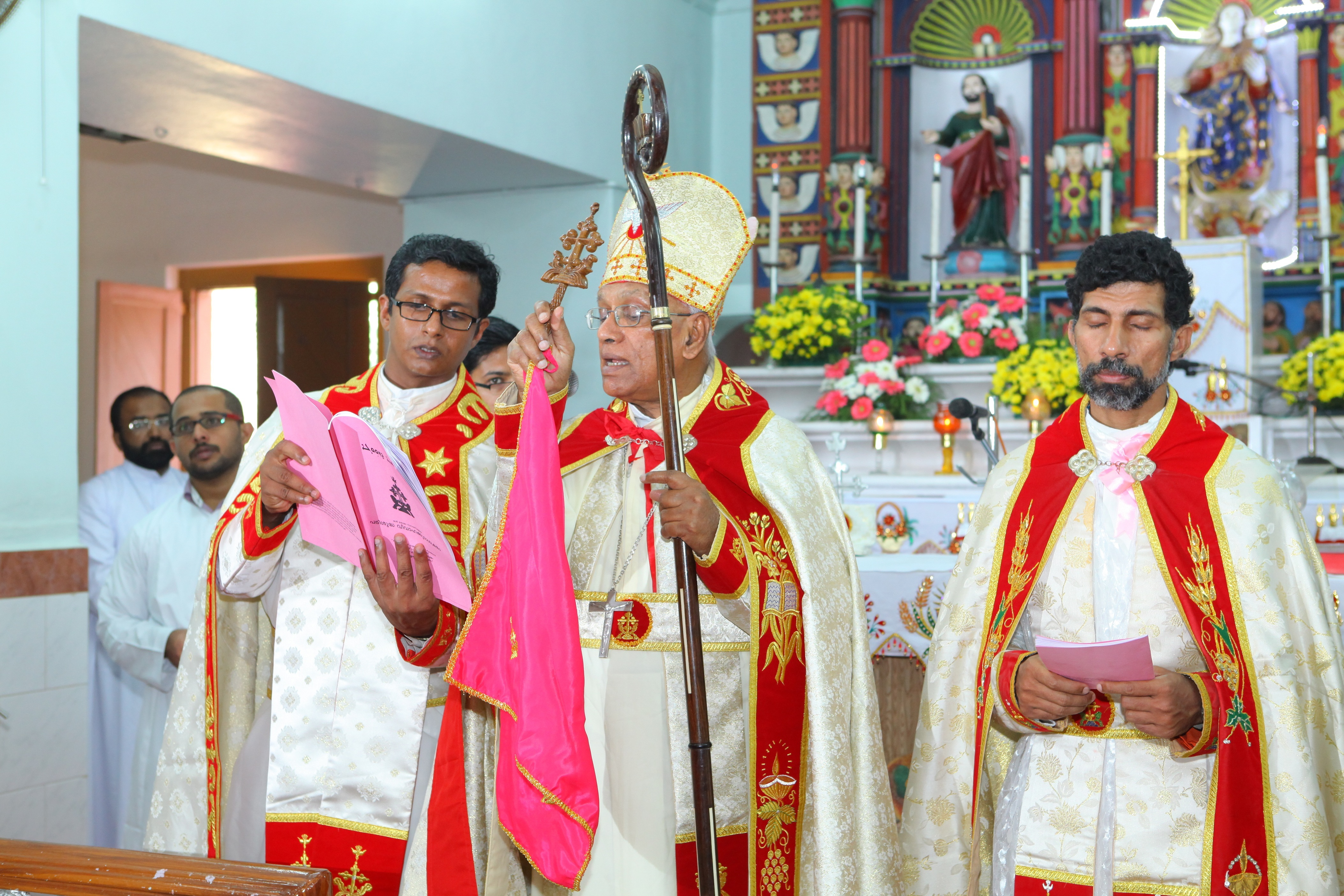
Bishop Mar Gregory Karotemprel and Fr. Palakkappilly at Marth Mariam Church, Arakuzha.

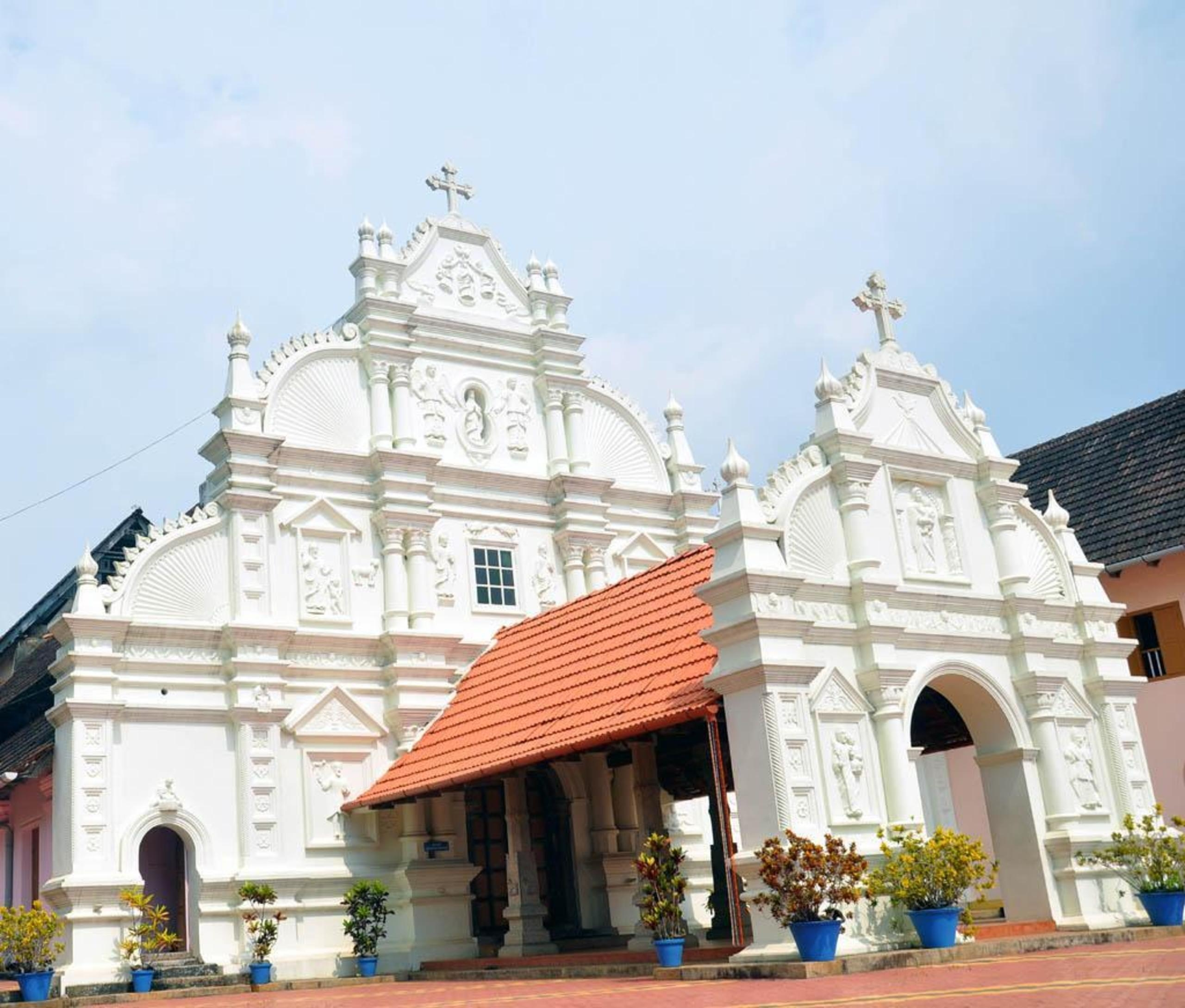

== Daily Qurbana Timings ==
Sunday	5:15 AM - Sapra, 5:45 AM
Monday	6:15 AM - Sapra, 6:30 AM - Holy Qurbana
Tuesday	6:15 AM - sapra, 6:30 AM- Holy Qurbana
Wednesday	6:15 AM - Sapra, 6:30 AM - Holy Qurbana
Thursday	6:15 AM - sapra, 6:30 AM - Holy Qurbana
Friday	6:15 AM - Sapra, 6:30 AM - Holy Qurbana 10.00 AM Maleakurishu Chapel
Saturday	6:00 AM - Holy Qurbana, Novena 7:00 A M - Holy Qurbana, Novena
