= Meenkunnam =

- village
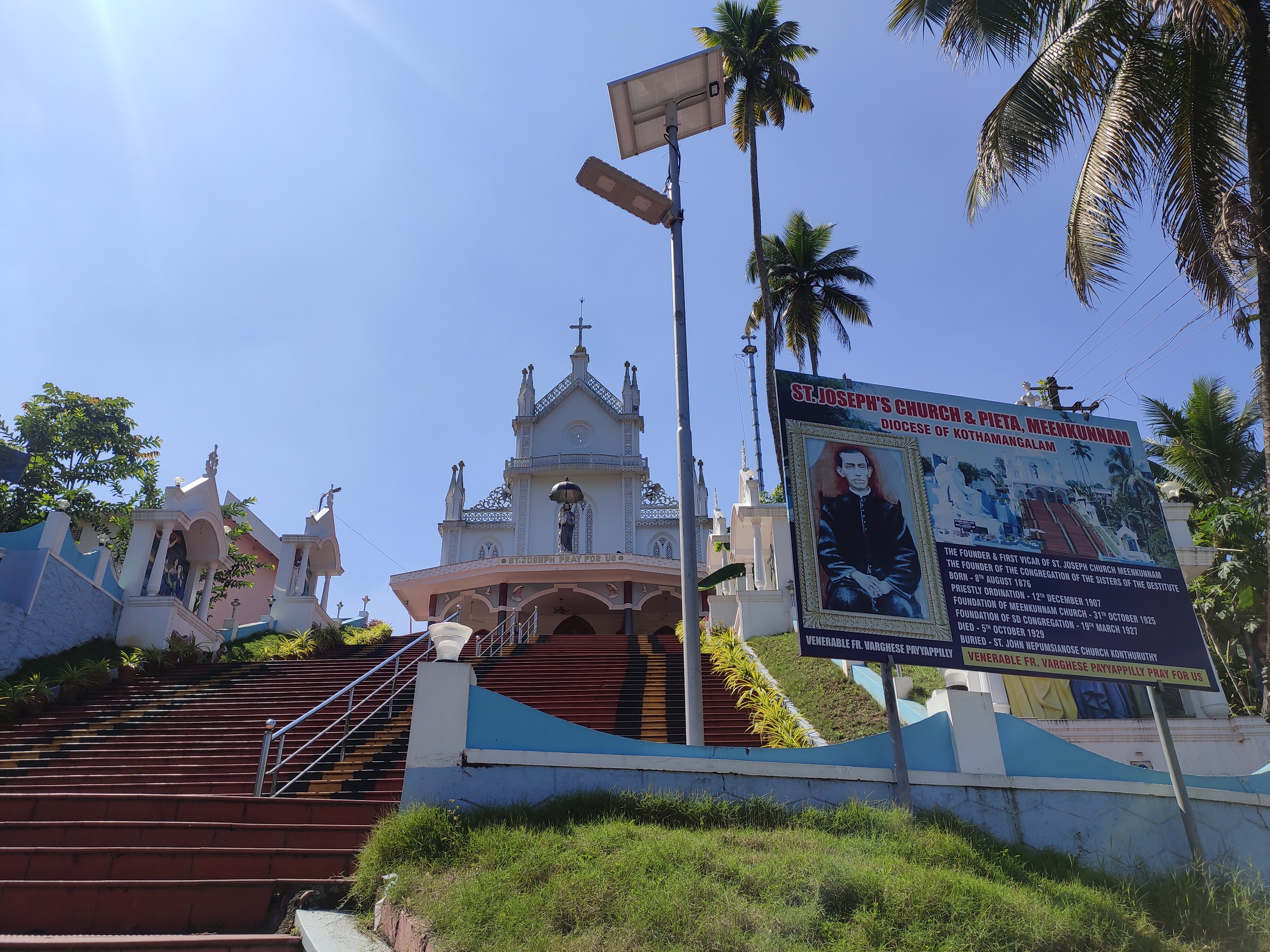
- St. Joseph's Syro-Malabar Catholic Church, Meenkunnam

- Location in Kerala, India Meenkunnam (India)
- Coordinates: 9.929°N 76.576°E
- Country: India
- State: Kerala
- District: Ernakulam

Languages
  - Official: Malayalam, English
- Time zone: UTC+5:30 (IST)
- PIN: 686672
- Telephone code: 91 485
- Vehicle registration: KL-17
- Nearest city: Muvattupuzha
- Lok Sabha constituency: Idukki

Meenkunnam is a village with waterfalls, rocky terrains, small hills, and paddy fields. It is located within Arakuzha and Marady Panchayat, Kerala. The local community heavily rely on farming and forms an agrarian-based economy. Most of the income is generated from rubber and pineapple plantations combined with other cash crops such as black pepper, cocoa bean, banana, and tapioca. Due to farming, when compared with the extent of land which was available a decade ago, only 20% of the paddy fields remain today.

== Landmarks ==
=== St. Joseph's Church ===
St. Joseph's Syro-Malabar Catholic Church of Meenkunnam was founded by Mar Varghese Payyappilly Palakkappilly.

=== Little Flower Lower Primary School ===
Little Flower Lower Primary School enrolls children from Grade 1 to Grade 5.

=== Pietà ===
A main landmark of Meenkunnam is a copy of Michelangelo's Pietà, which was created by the artist Appukuttan. It is situated in front of St. Joseph's Syro-Malabar Catholic Church. This sculpture at Meenkunnam gigantic when compared with the size of the original Pietà (1.74 m x 1.95 m), located at the St. Peter's Basilica, Vatican City. Owing to its size, the artist could make a compromise on intricate details and created a sculpture lacking realism, ideal beauty, harmony and balance observed in the original sculpture which showcases a balance of Renaissance ideals of classical beauty with naturalism.

== Mayiladum Para Action Council ==
Mayiladum Para Action Council was set up in an attempt to resist unrestrained rock quarrying on areas surrounding Meenkunnam. This action council has been in operation since 2007.
