= Sisters of the Destitute =

Syro-Malabar Catholic women's order

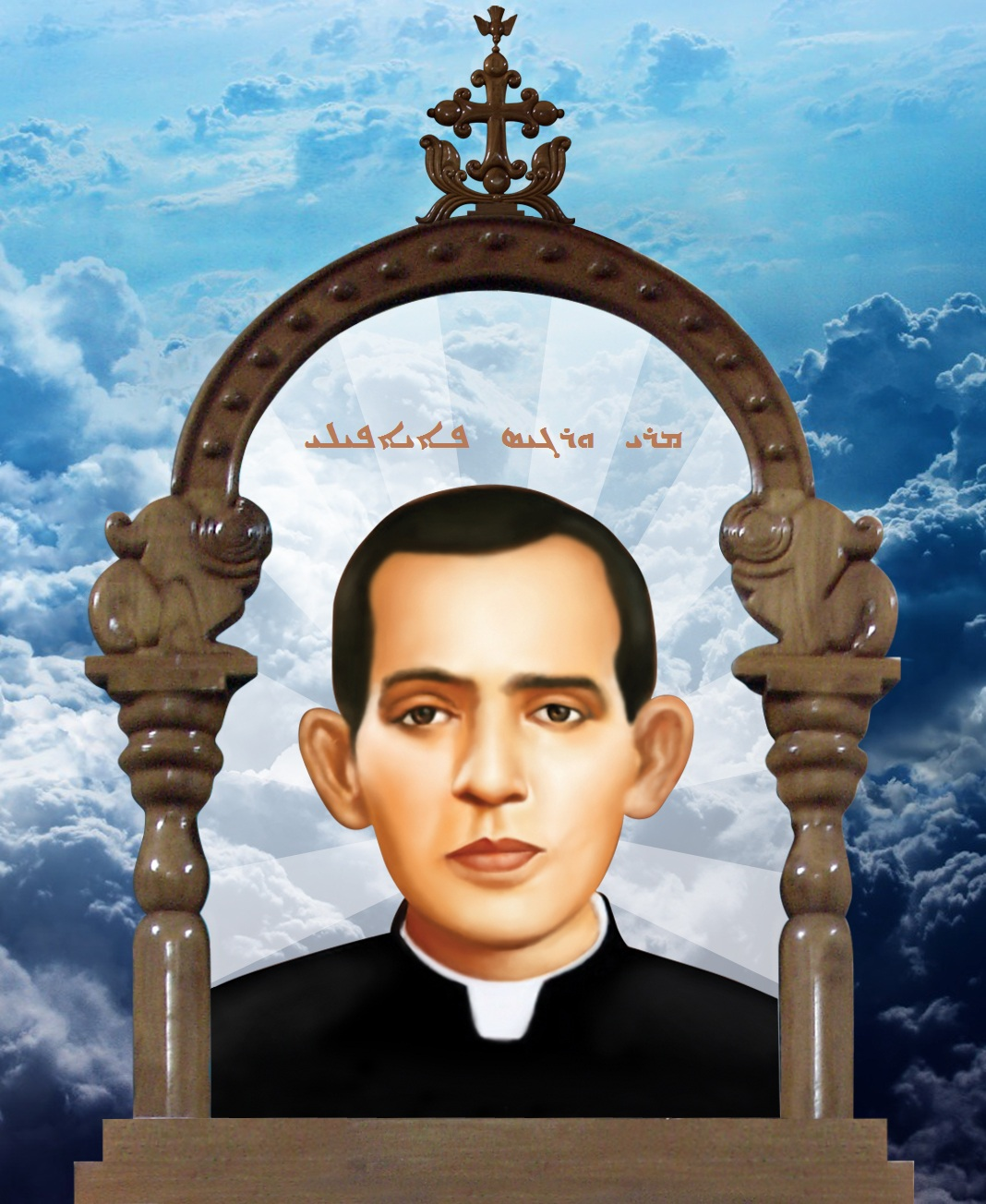
- Venerable Mar Payyappilly Varghese Kathanar

Sisters of the Destitute (S.D) is a Syro-Malabar Catholic women's religious institute. Venerable Mar Payyappilly Varghese Kathanar laid the foundation stone on 1927 March 19 at Aluva.Currently there are 6 provinces and 1 region inside India and abroad having a number of 1835 sisters.

== History ==
The Congregation of the Sisters of the Destitute was founded by Venerable Mar Varghese Payyappilly Palakkappilly in Chunangamvely, Kerala on 19 March 1927.

It includes over 1,500 nuns and is composed of physicians, nurses, lawyers, teachers and social workers. Now it is working in Asia, Europe, Africa and the USA. One of the branch in Kayakkunn near Panamaram, Wayanad District.

Sisters of the Destitute runs many institutions like :

- Homes for the sick and the needy
- Rehabilitation centres for mentally and physically handicapped children
- Health centres for AIDS and cancer patients
- Dispensary for the poor
- Libraries
- Nursing homes
- Schools
- Hospitals
