= Mary Celine Payyappilly =

Nun from Kerala, India

Servant of God Mary Celine Payyappilly C.M.C.

Religious
- Born: Annakkutty Payyappilly; 10 December 1906; Mallusserry, Kerala, India
- Died: 23 April 1993 (aged 86); Karukutty, Kerala, India
- Venerated in: Syro-Malabar Catholic Church

Mary Celine Payyappilly was a Syrian Catholic (Syro-Malabar) nun from the Indian state of Kerala. She was declared as Servant of God by Mar George Cardinal Alencherry, Major Archbishop of the Syro-Malabar Catholic Church on 9 April 2018.

== Family ==
Mary Celine Payyappilly was born as Annakkutty Payyappilly on 10 December 1906 at Mallusserry to Payyappilly Ousep and Kochumariam. Payyappilly is an ancient Nasrani family in India believed to be baptized by Thomas the Apostle in Kottakkavu, North Paravur in the first century. The word Payyappilly, translated as "beautiful building" or "beautiful house", is derived from the Syriac ܦܐܝܐ Payya "beautiful, radiant" and the Malayalam word പിള്ളി Pilly, a variant of പള്ളി Pally, "church, building". Her forefather Vareed Payyappilly migrated from Paravur to Mallusserry and settled at Thattaduparambu. Hence her family is also known as Thattad Payyappilly. Mary Celine Payyappilly is the second Servant of God from Payyappilly family; the first being Mar Varghese Payyappilly, whose forefather Payyappilly Cheria Mappila migrated from Paravur to Perumanoor and founded the Palakkappilly branch of Payyappilly family.

== Life ==
Annakkutty Payyappilly had her schooling in the Government school at Vattapparambu and became a C.M.C. (Congregation of the Mother of Carmel) sister on 29 May 1928. Mary Celine Payyappilly started her career as a teacher at St. Joseph School, Karukutty. Later, she served as the headmistress of St. Augustine's High School, Muvattupuzha and B.T.S., Karukutty. She was elected as the Superior General of Ernakulam and Kothamangalam provinces of C.M.C. on 17 March 1963 and went on to become the first Superior General of the united C.M.C. congregation on 16 November 1963. In 1968, she was re-elected as Superior General and retired in 1974 after serving as Superior General for 11 years. It was she who built the Central House Generalate of the united C.M.C. at Thaikattukara, Aluva. She died on 23 April 1993 at Karukutty.

== Cause ==
The Cause of the Beatification of Mary Celine Payyappilly was initiated on 9 April 2018 by Mar George Alencherry, Major Archbishop of the Syro-Malabar Church in the presence of the bishops Mar Sebastian Adayanthrath and Mar Jose Puthenveettil.
