= Eparchy of Kothamangalam =

Eastern Catholic eparchy in Keralam, India

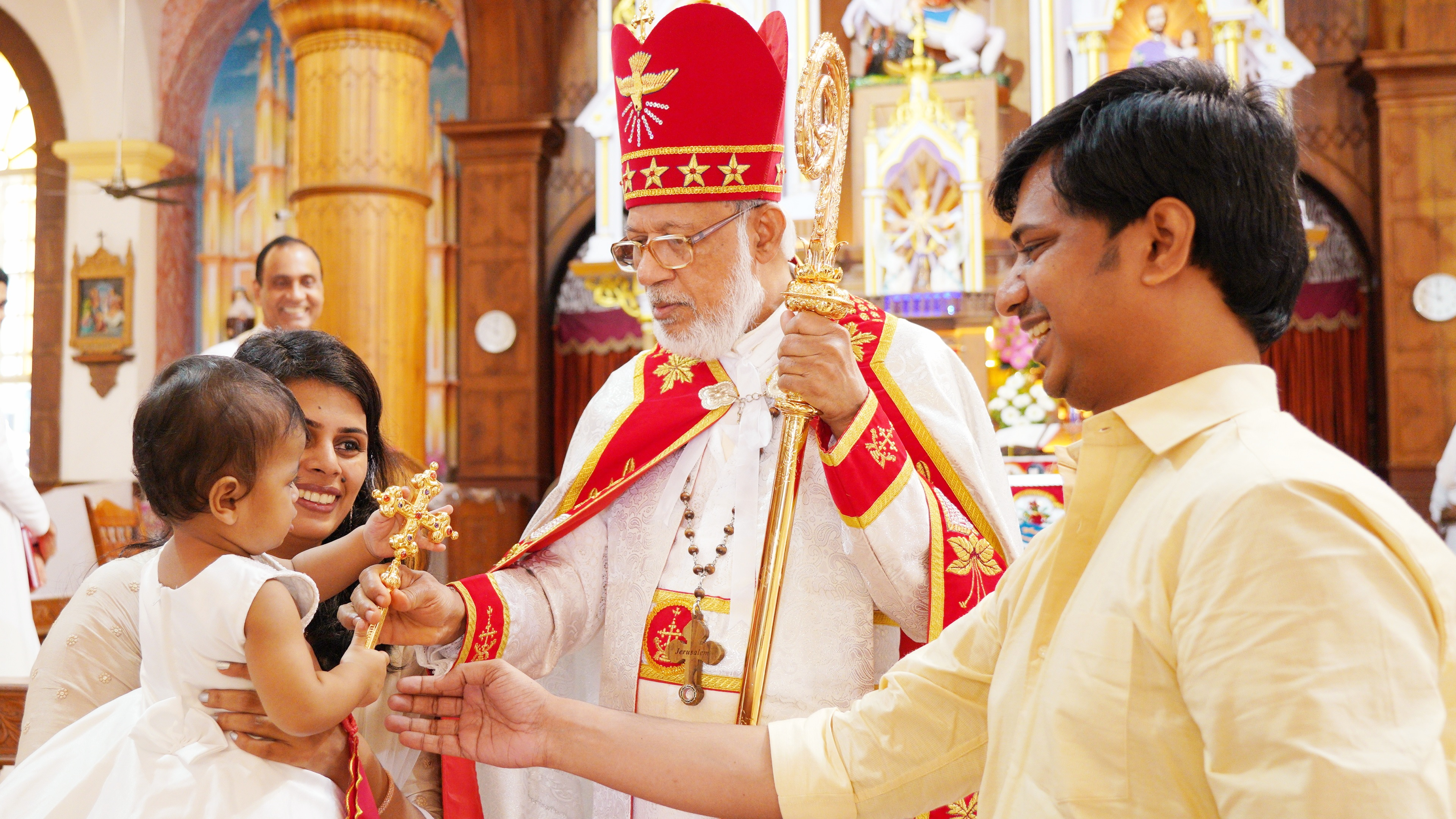
- Syro-Malabar Major Archbishop Mar George Alencherry at St. George Cathedral, Kothamangalam

- Coat of arms

Location
- Country: India

Statistics
- Area: 4,840 km^{2} (1,870 sq mi)
- Population: Total; Catholics: (as of 2011); 885,320; 231,300 (29.3%)
- Parishes: 120
- Schools: 175

Information
- Denomination: Catholic Church
- Sui iuris church: Syro-Malabar Church
- Rite: East Syriac Rite
- Established: 29 July 1956
- Cathedral: St. George Cathedral, Kothamangalam, Kerala
- Patron saint: Immaculate Heart of Mary
- Secular priests: 543

Current leadership
- Pope: Leo XIV
- Major Archbishop: Raphael Thattil
- Bishop: George Madathikandathil
- Bishops emeritus: George Punnakottil (1977-2013), Mathew Pothanamuzhi (1956-1977)

Website
- Website of the Diocese

The Eparchy of Kothamangalam is an Syro-Malabar Church ecclesiastical jurisdiction or eparchy of the Catholic Church in India. It was established by Pope Pius XII in 1957. Mar George Madathikandathil is the eparch since 10 January 2013.

Eparchy of Kothamangalam stands in the Province of Ernakulam-Angamaly, with the Major Archbishop & Metropolitan of Ernakulam - Angamaly as it's Provincial Head. It is situated in the central region of the Indian state of Keralam, the Eparchy of Kothamangalam lies extended in Ernakulam and Idukki districts of Keralam, neighbouring the Archeparchy of Ernakulam-Angamaly, eparchies of Irinjalakuda, Idukki and Pala. Mar Mathew Pothanamuzhy was the first bishop of the eparchy. He was succeeded by Mar George Punnakottil served as the bishop until 10 January 2013, when his resignation was accepted by the synod.

== Boundaries ==
It is bounded on the north by the Periyar river, on the east by the Uzhavathadam river, Cheeyapara Waterfalls, and the Kulamavu Dam; on the west by Kolenchery, and on the south by Ramamangalam, Memuri, Marady, Arakuzha, Purapuzha and Karimkunnam villages, Vazhipuzha river, eastern boundary of Velliamatam and southern boundary of Thodupuzha taluk.

== Population ==
The Kothamangalam Diocese has a total of approximately 231,300 faithful under its jurisdiction.

== Ordinaries ==
Bishops

Sl.no	Name	Designation	Year of appointment	Last year of service
1	Matthew Pothanamuzhi	Bishop	1956	1977
2	George Punnakottil	Bishop	1977	2013
3	George Madathikandathil	Bishop	2013	present

Prelate's Hailing from the Diocese

Sl.no	Name	Designation	Year of appointment	Last year of service
1	Thomas Thiruthalil C.M	Former Bishop of Berhampur and Balasore	1974	2013
2	Thomas Pulloppillil	Bishop of Bongaigaon	2000	present
3	John Thomas Kattrukudiyil	Former Bishop of Dhipu and Itanagar	1994	2023
4	Benny Varghese Edathattel	Bishop of Itanagar	2023	present
5	Chacko Thottumarickal, S.V.D	Former Bishop of Jhubua and Indore	2002	2024
6	Thomas Mathew Kuttimackal	Bishop of Indore	2024	present
7	Matthew Vaniakizhakel, C.V.	Former Bishop of Satna	1999	2014
8	Joseph Kodakallil	Bishop of Satna	2015	present
9	John Vadakel, C.M.I.	Former Bishop of Bijnor	2009	2019
10	Joshy Pottackal O.Carm	Auxiliary Bishop of Mainz	2026	present

== Foranes & Parishes ==
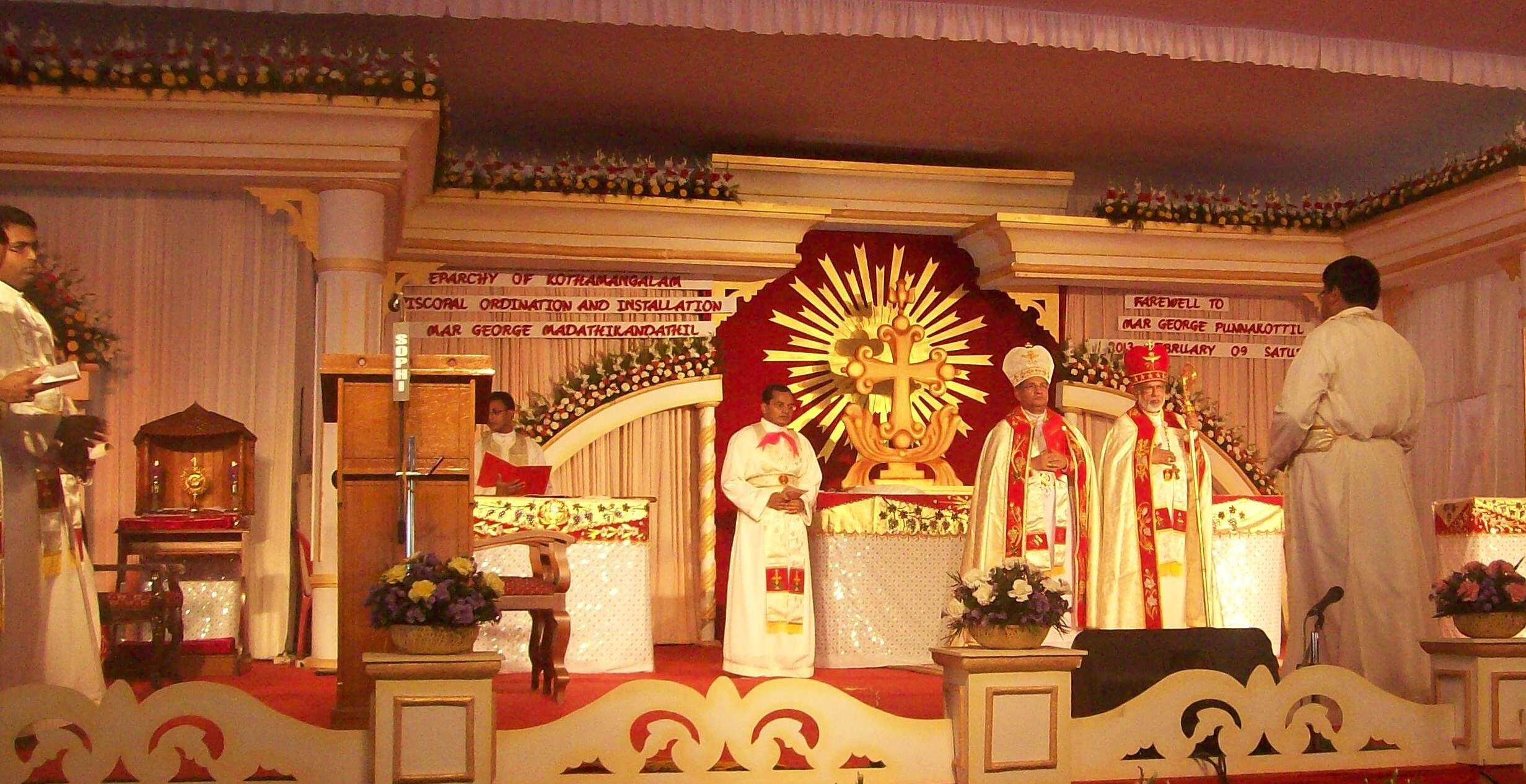
Syro-Malabar Major Archbishop Mar George Alencherry during the Episcopal Ordination of Mar George Madathikandathil as the Bishop of the Syro-Malabar Eparchy of Kothamangalam

1. Kothamangalam Forane (St George Cathedral Forane church)

1. Kothamangalam
2. Injoor
3. Malippara
4. Mathirappilly
5. Nadukani
6. Nellimattom
7. Thrikkariyoor
8. Vettampara
9. Allungal
10. Nellikuzhy

2. Arakuzha Forane (Marth Mariam Syro-Malabar Catholic Major Archiepiscopal Forane Church, Arakuzha)

1. Arakuzha
2. Arikkuzha
3. Meenkunnam (St. Joseph's Catholic Church)
4. Peringuzha
5. Perumballur
6. Thottakkara

3. Kaliyar Forane (St. Ritha Forane Church)

1. Kaliyar
2. Koduvely
3. Mannukkad
4. Mundanmudy
5. Njarakkad
6. Thennathur
7. Thommankuthu
8. Vannappuram

4. Karimannoor Forane (St. Marys Forane Church)

1. Karimannoor
2. Cheenikkuzhy
3. Cheppukulam
4. Chilavu
5. Kaithappara
6. Malayinchi
7. Mulappuram
8. Neyyasserry
9. Pallikkamuri
10. Peringasserry
11. Thattakkuzha
12. Udumbannoor
13. Uppukunnu

5. Mailakkombu Forane ( St Thomas Forane Church)

1. Mailakkombu
2. Ezhallur
3. Kaloor
4. Nakappuzha
5. Perumbillichira
6. Thazhuvamkunnu

6. Maarika Forane ( St Joseph Forane Church)

1. Maarika
2. Kolady
3. Kuninji
4. Nediyasala
5. Purappuzha

7. Muthalakkodam Forane (St George Forane Church)

1. Muthalakkodam
2. Chalasserry
3. Kodikkulam
4. Paarappuzha
5. Vandamattom
6. Vazhakkala

8. Muvattupuzha Forane (Holy Magi Syro-Malabar Catholic Forane Church, Muvattupuzha)

1. Muvattupuzha
2. St Sebastian's Church Anicadu
3. Karakkunnam
4. Marady
5. Mekkadambu
6. Mudavoor
7. Muvattupuzha East
8. Randaar
9. Vazhappilly East

9. Oonnukal Forane(Little Flower Syro Malabar Catholic Forane Church)

1. Oonnukal
2. Ambikapuram
3. Injathotty
4. Maamalakkandam
5. Neendapaara
6. Neryamangalam
7. Parikkanni
8. Pazhambillichal
9. Perumannur

10. Paingottoor Forane ( St Antony Forane Church)

1. Paingottoor
2. Kalvarigiri (Kulappuram)
3. Kadavoor
4. Mullaringad
5. Pothanikkad
6. Punnamattom
7. Rajagir (Vellallu)

11. Thodupuzha Forane ( St Sebastian Forane Church)

1. Thodupuzha
2. Alakkodu
3. Anjiri
4. Chittur
5. Kalayanthani
6. Kallanikkal
7. Methotty
8. Nazareth hill (Thoyipra)
9. Nediyakaad
10. Pannimattom
11. Ponnanthanam
12. Thalayanad
13. Thodupuzha East
14. Vettimattom

12. Vazhakkulam Forane (St. George Syro-Malabar Catholic Forane Church) (വാഴക്കുളം ഫൊറോന പള്ളി)

1. Vazhakulam
2. Ayavana
3. Beslehem
4. Enanelloor
5. Kadalikkad
6. Kalloorkkad
7. Kavakkad
8. Nadukkara
9. Vadakode

13.Kuruppampady Forane (St. Peter & Paul Forane Church)

1. Kuruppampady
2. Kutthunkal
3. Nedungapra
4. Kottapady
5. Muttathuppara

14.Velielchal Forane St. Joseph's Forane Church

1. Velielchal
2. Vadattupara
3. Pooyamkutty
4. Njayappilly
5. Urulanthanni
6. Manikandamchal
7. Kallelimedu
8. Keerampara
9. Kuttampuzha

== Filial Churches ==
1. Infant Jesus Church Nazarathvalley
2. Infant Jesus Church Nazarethhill
3. Little Flower Church Pallickamury
4. St. Alphonsa's Church Pulickathotty
5. St. Alphonsa's Church Uppukunnu
6. St. Francis Xavier's Church Kulappura
7. St. Jude Church Kallelimedu
8. St. Mary's Church Manikandamchal
9. St. Mary's Church Mannukad
10. St. Mary's Church Ottalloor
11. St. Paul's Church Methotty

== Priests ==
Priests belonging to the Eparchy	260
Priests working outside	46
Priests out for studies	13
Priests Retired	25
Religious Priests	120

== Educational institutions ==
University Colleges	2
Engineering College	1
Self-financing colleges	3
Teacher Training College	1
Technical Schools	6
Higher Secondary Schools	21
High Schools	20
Upper Primary Schools	26
Lower Primary Schools	51
Unrecognized Schools	4
Nursery Schools	53

== Notable individuals ==
- George Karakunnel
