= George Karakunnel =

Indian Catholic priest and theologian

George Karakunnel is an Indian theologian. He is a Catholic priest of the Eparchy of Kothamangalam. He teaches systematic theology in St. Joseph's Pontifical Institute, Mangalapuzha, Aluva, Kerala, India. He has a Doctorate in theology from Gregorian University, Rome. He also has a master's degree in the philosophy of religions from the University of London. He is a member of the International Theological Commission in Vatican.

His major works are The Christian Vision of Man,(Asian Trading Corporation, Bangalore, 1984), Advaita and Liberation, (Asian Trading Corporation, Bangalore, 2004), The anthropological foundations of christology in the pastoral constitution on the Church in the modern world "Gaudium et Spes" (S.H. League, Aluva, 1984), Sabha: Adisthanangalum Abhimukhyangalum , Sabhayum Suvisesha Dauthyavum, Atmeeyanveshanangal, Sabha: Danavum Dauthyavum (S.H. League, Aluva, 2004). He has received the Bishop Jerome Award and KCBC Media Award. These books are available in International Library Catalogues.

== Sources ==
- Biographical Note in Sabha: Danavum Dauthyavum, Alwaye, 2004
