= Kuninji =

- Village
- Interactive map of Kuninji
- Coordinates: 9.840756°N 76.646912°E ,
- Country: India
- State: Kerala
- District: Idukki

Government
  - Type: Gram panchayat

Languages
  - Official: Malayalam, English
- Time zone: UTC+5:30 (IST)
- PIN: 685583
- Telephone code: 04862
- Vehicle registration: KL-38
- Nearest city: Thodupuzha, Muvattupuzha, Ernakulam
- Nearest Railway Station: Aluva
- Lok Sabha constituency: Idukki
- Climate: Tropical monsoon (Köppen)
- Avg. summer temperature: 32.5 °C (90.5 °F)
- Avg. winter temperature: 20 °C (68 °F)

Kuninji is a village in the Idukki district of Kerala, India. It is located close to Thodupuzha in central Kerala. Kuninji is surrounded by seven hills. It has a church called St. Antony's Church.
