= Kayakkunn Vishnugudi Temple =

Jain temple in Kerala, India

Vishnugudi Vishnu temple in Wayanad now a national monument

== Notification of Monument Status ==
The Archaeological Survey of India (ASI) has issued the final notification to declare the Vishnu temple (Vishnugudi), one of the two ancient monuments at Punchavayal, near Panamaram, in Wayanad as a national monument.

This notification has been issued as per Section 4 of the Ancient Monuments and Archaeological Sites and Remains Act 1958.

A preliminary notification was issued in 2014, regarding any complaint or objection of the public to declaring the ancient monument to be of national importance.

As the ASI is yet to receive any such objection, the authority is issuing the final notification to declare the monument as a protected monument.

A directive has been given to the Superintending Archaeologist, ASI, Thrissur Circle, to adopt necessary steps to preserve the structure and adopt necessary steps for the safety and security of the monument.

The then Union Minister V. Narayanasamy had made an announcement in 2009 (in the Lok Sabha) that the Union government would declare the Vishnu temple as well as the Janardhanagudi (Janardhana temple), two ancient temples at a distance of nearly 700 metre, as national monuments.

== Features ==
Nearly 300 carvings on huge stone pillars of the temple have survived the passage of time.

A sculpture of a man fishing, a primitive war scene featuring tuskers, other such war scenes, a stone edict in old Kannada script, figures of Jain deities, and sculptures of the ‘Dashavathara’ still stand.

The intricate and elaborate carvings on the pillars are in a bad state due to long years of neglect.

== Plans For Other Monuments ==
Measures are under way to declare the Janardhanagudi also as a national monument.
