= Vandamattom =

- Village
- Location in Kerala, India Vandamattom (India)
- Coordinates: 9.908056°N 76.72°E
- Country: India
- State: Kerala
- District: Idukki

Languages
  - Official: Malayalam, English
- Time zone: UTC+5:30 (IST)
- PIN: 685582
- Telephone code: 04862
- Vehicle registration: KL-38
- Nearest city: Thodupuzha
- Website: www.facebook.com/pages/Vandamattom/139363206174100

Vandamattom is a village in Kodikulam Panchayath, Thodupuzha Taluk, Idukki district, Kerala, India.

== Location ==
Vandamattom is situated on the bank of a small river (Thodu) which runs from Chilavumala to Kaliyar River, in Kodikulam Grama Panchayath, Thodupuzha taluk, Idukki district, Kerala, India.

== History ==
The name Vandamattom came from earlier inhabitants, Vandanakara family of the area as the paddy fields (mattom) on the banks of the river belonged to Vandanakara family. Major families living in Vandamattom are Mundankavil, Vandanakara, Vaniyekizhakkel, Vattakkunnel, Panthackal, Puthiyaveettil, Kalluvelil, Kottoor, Thekkel, Palakkattu, Chelapurath, Kunnathu, Parachalil, Makkal and Arayathinal.

== Religion ==
Vandamattom is a place of great communal harmony where people respect and value each other. Inhabitants of Vandamattom are mostly Syro malabar Catholics, Hindus belonging to Vellala and Ezhava castes. About 700 years ago the place where the present St. George Church stands was a graveyard for Christians and there was the Vandamattom cross (Vettukallel Kurisu). The descendants of the deceased gathered near the cross to celebrate their death anniversary and conducted oottu (feast). St. George Catholic Church, under Kothamangalam diocese and St. George Forane church, Muthalakodam is the religious institution of Christians.

The Church feast is conducted in 24–26 January every year. The church is supported by an FC convent, which runs a Nursery school (kindergarten) and a tailoring institute for young women. Elambilakattu Devi Temple is the place of worship of the Hindu community. Ulsavam is conducted every year and is a major event of religious gathering in Vandamattom. People from neighboring villages also come for Poojas and various offerings.

== Culture ==
Kerala Public Library and Arts & Sports Club is the cultural headquarters of Vandamattom. The library was started in 1960s. It has a huge collection of books of various genres. The library has a reading room attached to it, with all major Malayalam daily newspapers and various magazines. The club takes initiative of the cultural events during Onam and Christmas.

== Vandamattom Pourasamithi ==
'Vandamattom Pourasamithi' is a forum for youth of Vandamattom. The friends of the forum have taken the initiative of Onam and Christmas celebrations in the locality for many years. Onam celebration of Pourasamithi is a huge cultural fest for 4 to 5 days and is attended by people from various places. Onam celebrations conducted by 'Vandamattom Paurasamithy'.

== Vandamattom Aquatic Club ==
Vandamattom Aquatic Club is private swimming institute run by National Level Swimming Champion, Mr Baby Vattakkunnel. Club is located at 500 metres from Shampumpadi junction in West Kodikulam road. The club conducts swimming classes for both kids and adults. The pupils of this swimming academy has secured many swimming titles in District and State level.

== Government Services ==
Krishi Bhavan (Agriculture Office) of Kodikulam Grama Panchayath in Shappumpady, Post Office near FC convent, Public Library opposite Post Office, Sub-centre of Kodikulam Primary Health Centre in Shappumpady, Government UP School, Nedumattom Co-operative Bank (Nedumattom Service Co-operative Bank, Head office). ATM of Idukki District Cooperative Bank in bank building. BSNL first commercial 4G rollout happened in Thodupuzha on 3-11-2018, and Vandamattom residents were the first to receive BSNL 4G services among entire country. BSNL fiber 4G tower for Vandamattom with broadband lines cover 100% of the entire place.

== Government UP School Nedumattom ==
Government UPS located at Nedumattom is the only school in the area. This school was established more than 120 years back. But the available records in school shows only 100 years of its existence. The school celebrated its diamond jubilee in 2016-2017. Most of the older generation of Vandamattom got their primary education from this school. Though it has a history of more than 100 years, further development into high school or higher secondary school has not been fulfilled. Instead of developing into higher grade school, the concerned authorities are interested in building toilets in many parts of the school compound, including the playground of the students. This insensitive activity of the PTA was hugely condemned by many people.
