= Varghese Payyappilly =

Indian Catholic priest (1876–1929)

Venerable Payyappilly Varghese Kathanar
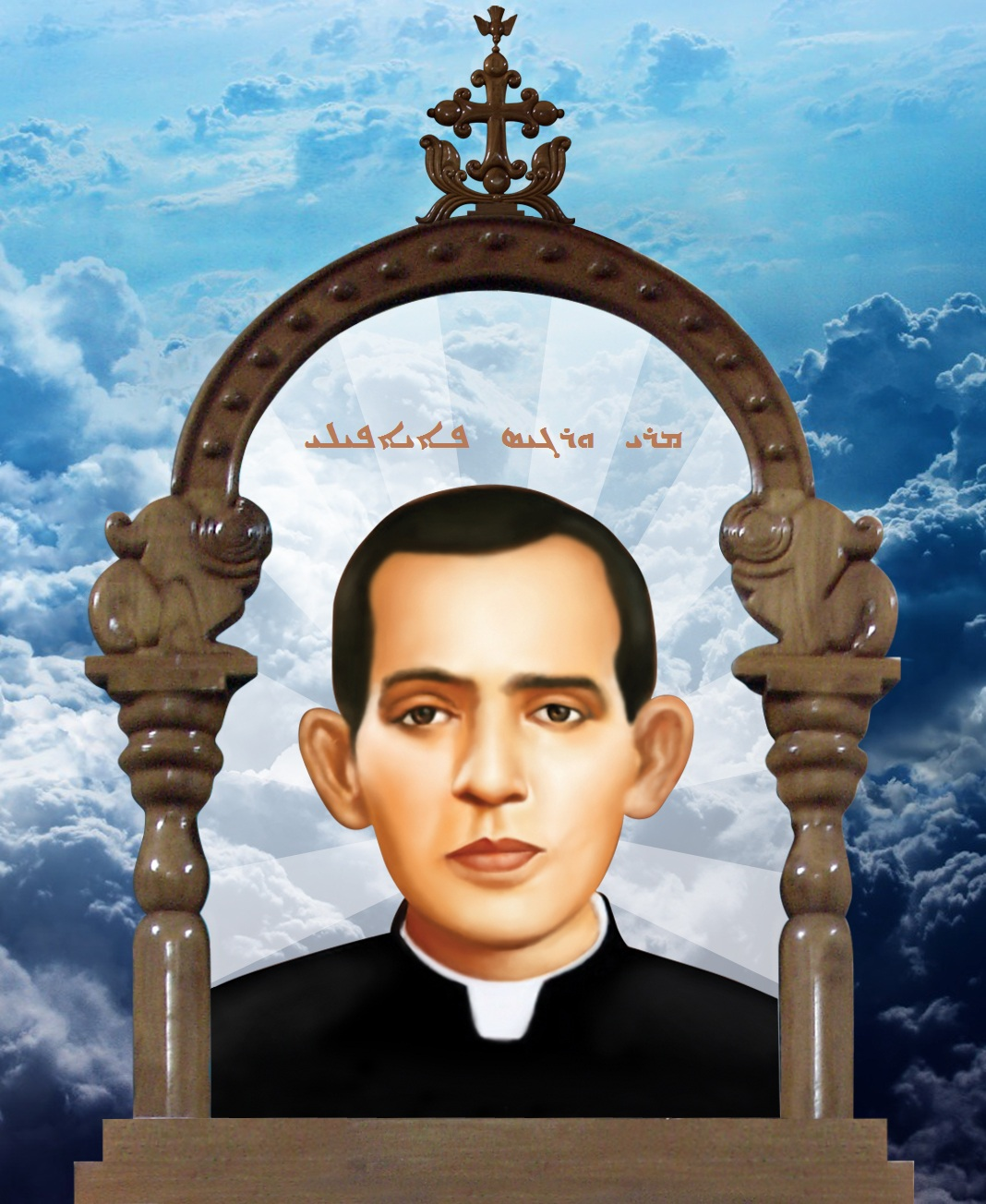
- Venerable Varghese Payyappilly
- Born: 8 August 1876; Perumanur, Thevara, Kingdom of Cochin
- Died: 5 October 1929 (aged 53); Ernakulam, Kingdom of Cochin

Signature of Payyappilly Varghese Kathanar in Syriac language

Varghese Payyappilly was an Indian Syro-Malabar priest from Kerala and the founder of the congregation of Sisters of the Destitute. He was declared Venerable by Pope Francis on 14 April 2018.

== Family ==
Kathanar was born as Kunjuvaru on 8 August 1876 to Payyappilly Lonan and Kunjumariam in the Palakkappilly branch of Payyappilly Nasrani family at Perumanoor, Thevara. Payyappilly is an ancient Saint Thomas Christian family in India, baptized by Thomas the Apostle in the first century. The word Payyappilly, translated as "beautiful building" or "beautiful house", is derived from the Syriac ܦܐܝܐ Payya "beautiful, radiant" and the Malayalam word പിള്ളി Pilly, a variant of പള്ളി Pally, "church, building". Mary Celine Payyappilly is another Servant of God from the Payyappilly family.

== Life ==
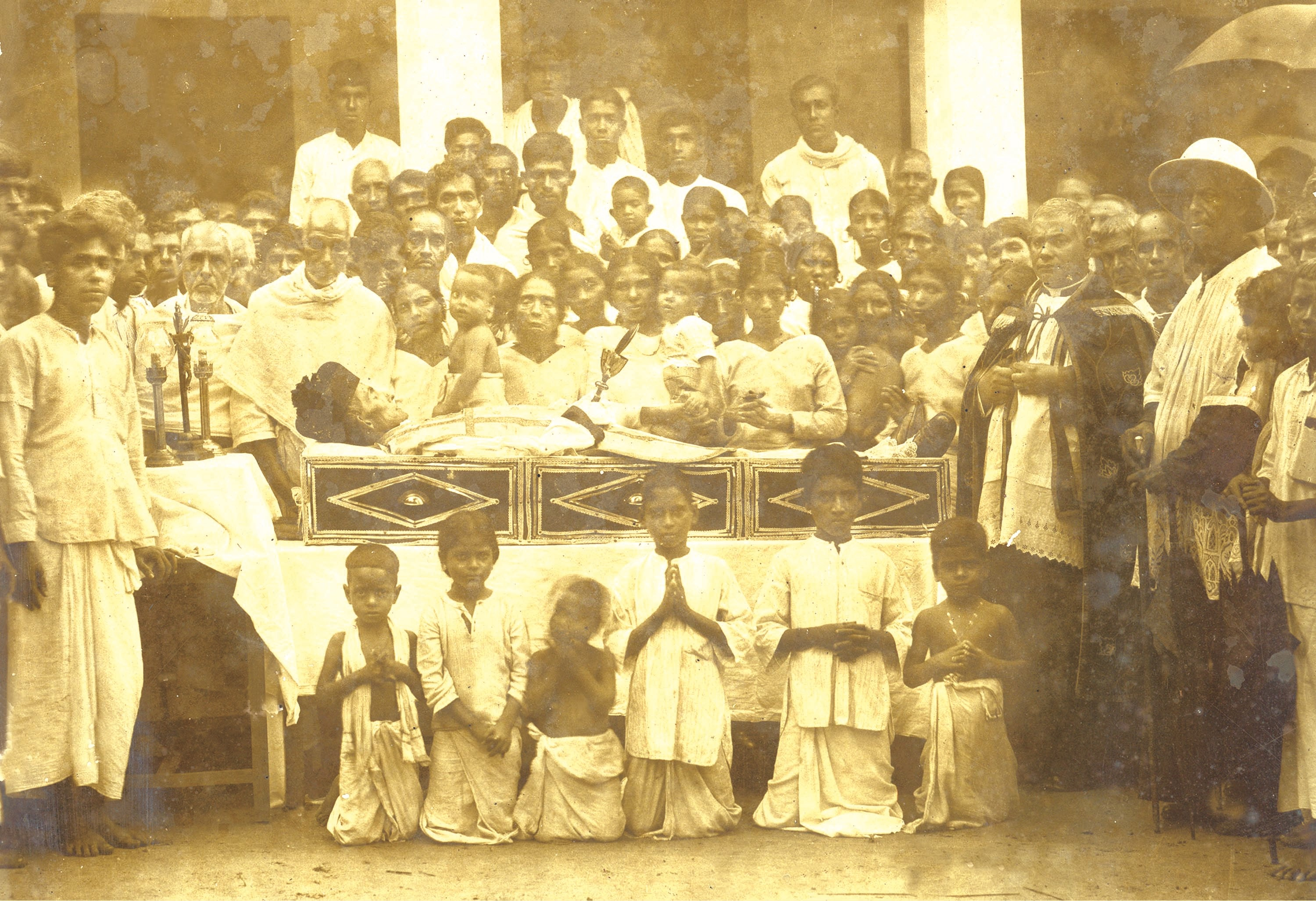
Funeral of Payyappilly Varghese Kathanar on 6 October 1929

Payyappilly was educated in the parish school at Perumanoor and at St. Albert's School, Ernakulam. He received his religious training from the Mangalapuzha Seminary at Puthenpally and the Papal Seminary at Kandy, Sri Lanka. He was ordained a priest on 21 December 1907 and was known as Payyappilly Varghese Kathanar. He learned the Syriac language under the guidance of Aloysius Pazheparambil.

Payyappilly served as parish priest in Kadamakkudy (1909–11), Alangad (1911–13) and Arakuzha (1920–22). During his tenure in Marth Mariam Syro-Malabar Catholic Forane Church, Arakuzha he began the St. Mary's Higher Secondary School there. His efforts transformed the parish and helped to solve many long-lasting family problems. He made some land purchases for the church, thus making it self-sufficient. He also purchased 12 acres (49,000 m^{2}) of land in M. C. Road for constructing St. Joseph's Syro-Malabar Catholic Church, Meenkunnam.

He was manager of St. Mary's High School, Aluva, Travancore, between 1913–1920 and 1922–1929. According to Mar Joseph Parecattil, who was a pupil at the time, the school was a seedbed of priestly vocations.

Payyappilly served as a member of the Diocesan Council, as Director of Apostolic Union as well as Priests' Provident Fund. He was a good mediator and people approached him seeking solutions to their problems. He was held in great honour by the church authorities and equally by the officials in the education department and government officers. His concern and care for the poor and the suffering were noted particularly in the way he helped the victims of a flood in 1924. He transformed his parish into a center for the homeless and turned St. Mary's High School into a shelter for the suffering people and brought food for them in a hired boat.

Payyappilly fell ill in September 1929 and eventually was hospitalised. He died of typhoid fever on 5 October 1929 and was buried in St. John Nepumsian Syro-Malabar Catholic Church, Konthuruthy.

== Founding of the Sisters of the Destitute ==
On 19 March 1927, Payyappilly founded the Sisters of the Destitute in Chunangamvely. This organisation was intended to continue what he saw as Christ's redemptive mission among the poor. He found abandoned people, brought them to the shelter of the Home for the Aged and nursed them. The Sisters of the Destitute were originally named "Little Sisters of the Poor" but in 1933 the name was changed to Sisters of the Destitute in order not to be confused with another congregation having the same name.

== Beatification process ==
The cause of the beatification of Payyappilly was initiated on 25 August 2009. He was declared a Servant of God by Varkey Vithayathil, Major Archbishop of the Syro-Malabar Catholic Church on 6 September 2009.

In February 2011, Payyappilly's remains were exhumed, identified and transferred to a new tomb. The tribunal that had been established to study the miraculous healing of Sr. Mercina through Payyappilly's intercession was closed in May 2012, and the Archdiocesan Tribunal was closed in November 2012. His case was submitted to the Congregation for the Causes of Saints, Rome, and on 14 April 2018 Pope Francis declared him venerable.

== Gallery ==
P. C. Paulose explains the origin of Palakkappilly branch of Payyappilly family

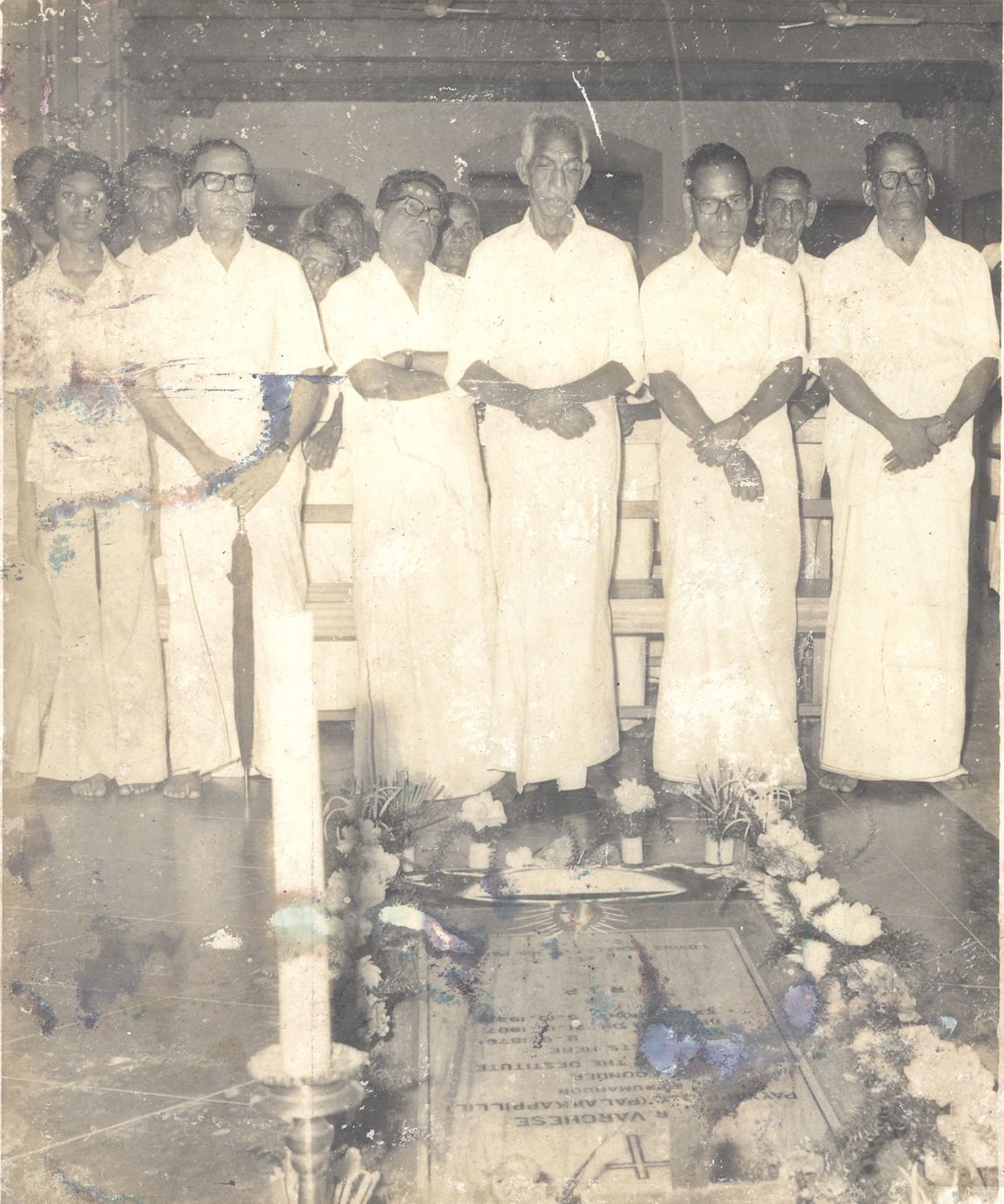
Members of Palakkappilly branch of Payyappilly family at the tomb of Payyappilly Varghese Kathanar during his 50th Dukrana on 5 October 1979

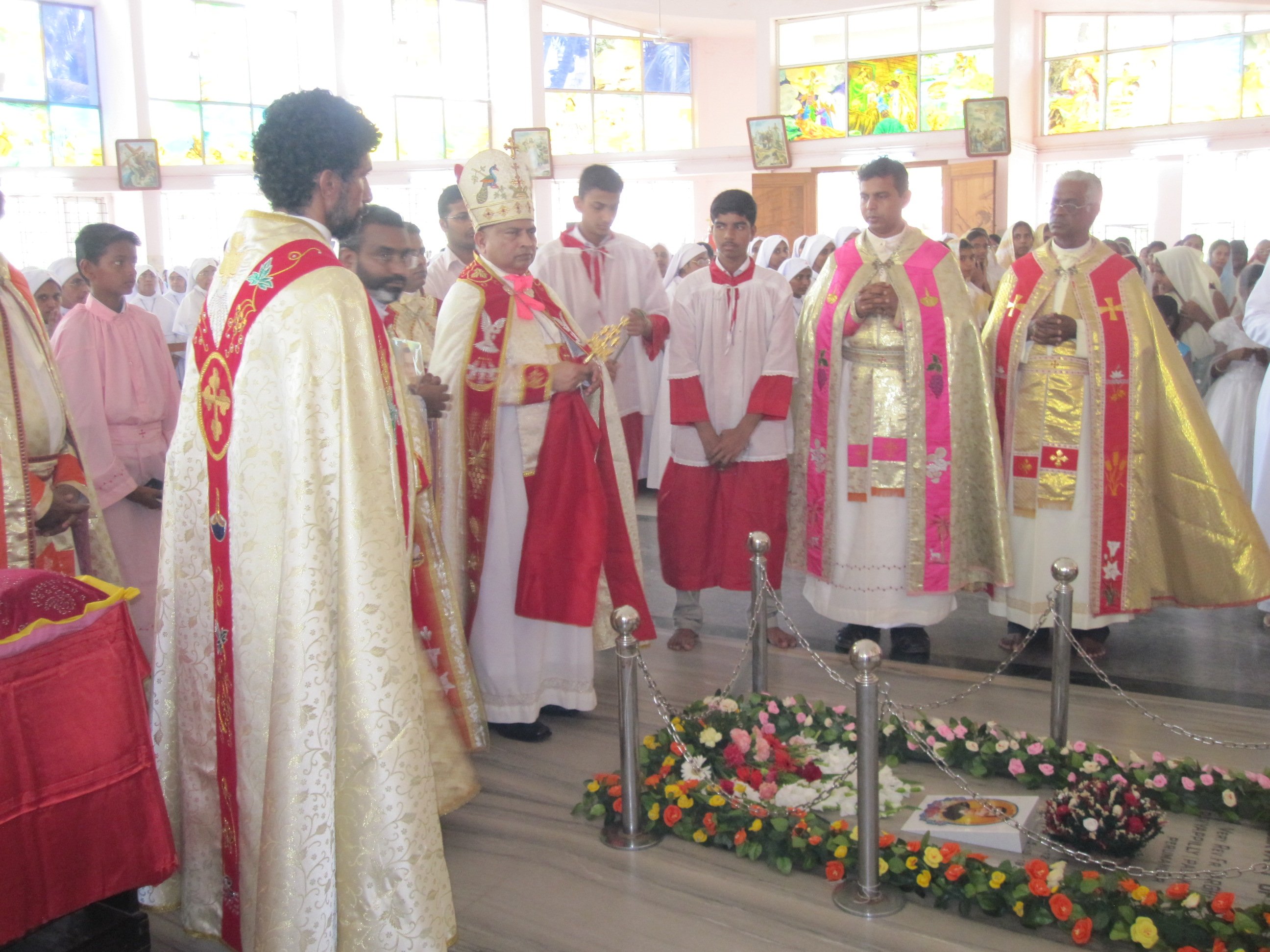
Kanjirappally bishop Mar Mathew Arackal and Prasant Payyappilly Palakkappilly at the tomb of Payyappilly Varghese Kathanar during his 81st Dukrana

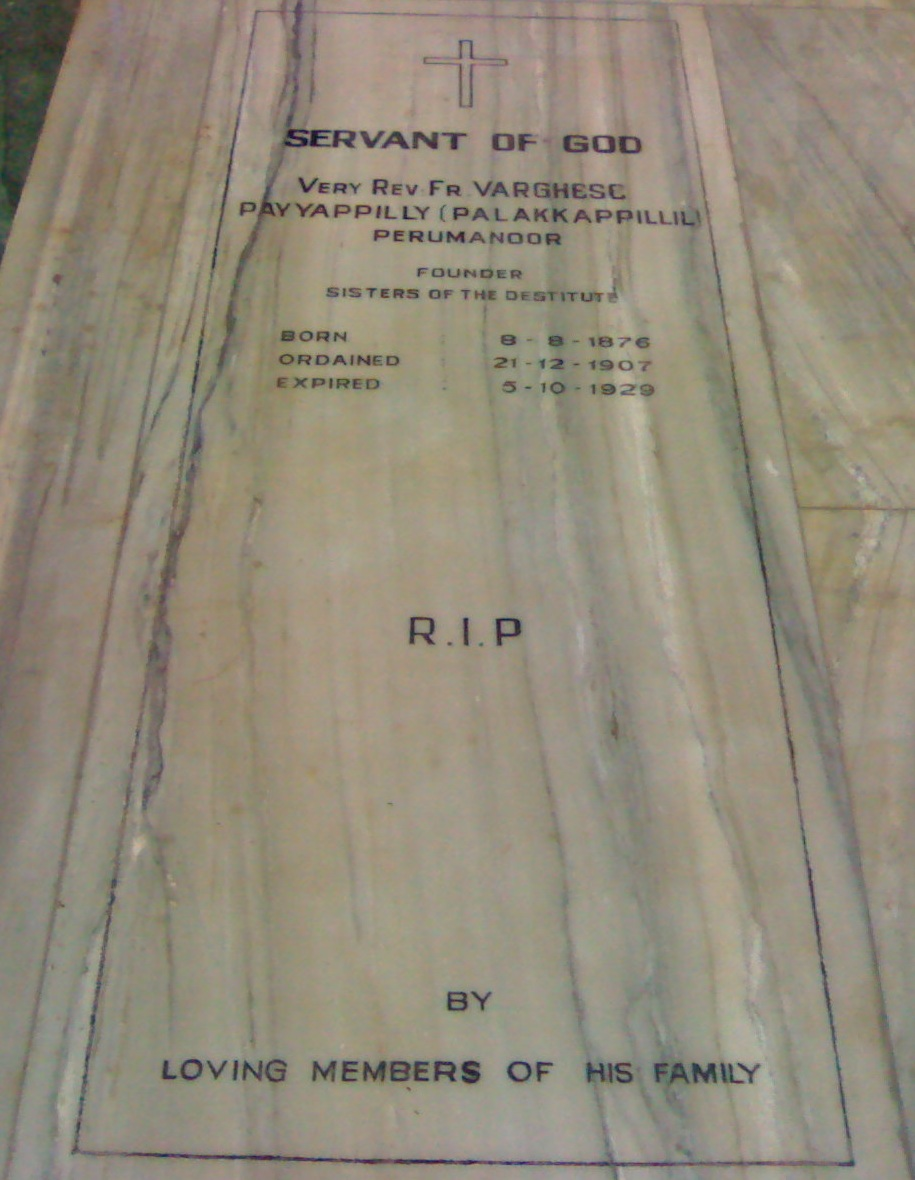
Tomb of Payyappilly Varghese Kathanar at St. John Nepumsian Syro-Malabar Church, Konthuruthy

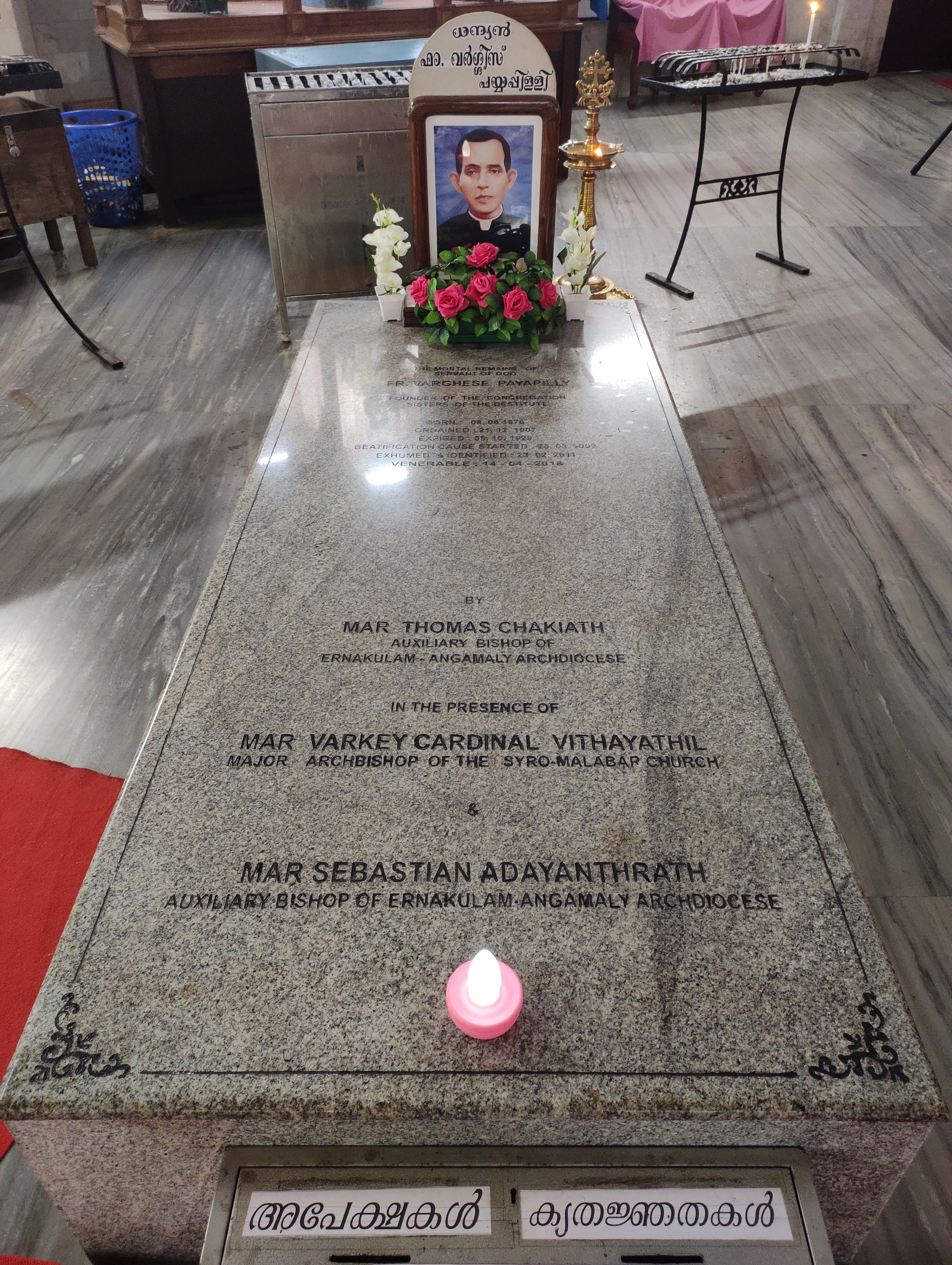
New tomb with mortal remains of Payyappilly Varghese Kathanar after exhumation
