= Kodikulam =

Panchayath in Idukki, Kerala

Coordinates: 10°00′N 79°12′E

Kodikulam is a panchayath in the Idukki district of the Indian state of Kerala. It is about 12 kilometers east of Thodupuzha, the nearest town.

== Geography ==
Kodikulam is a part of Thodupuzha taluk and the main population centers are East Kodikulam, West Kodikulam, Parappuzha, Thennathoor, Thalakkampuram, Chalakkamukku, Koduvely, Vellamchira and Vazhakkala. Kodikulam is divided into two - the eastern part is named Kizhake Kodikulam and the western Padinjare Kodikulam.

== Economy ==
It is part of the agrarian country side of Kerala. Rubber plantations are the main industry in this panchayat.

== Demographics ==
The population is a mix of Hindus, Christians and Muslims.

== Culture ==
St. Ann's church well-known. It is among the few churches in India named for St. Ann, the mother of the Virgin Mary. Three temples are located in Kodikulam. Thrikkovil Subrahmania temple is in West Kodikulam, Sri Chandrapillil Devi Kshetram managed by NSS Karayogam) is situated on the bank of a tributary to Kaliyar river at West kodikulam, and Anchakulam Bhagavathy temple.There are two juma masjid.Both named Muhiyuddeen juma masjid, one situated in vellamchira and other one in west kodikulam
